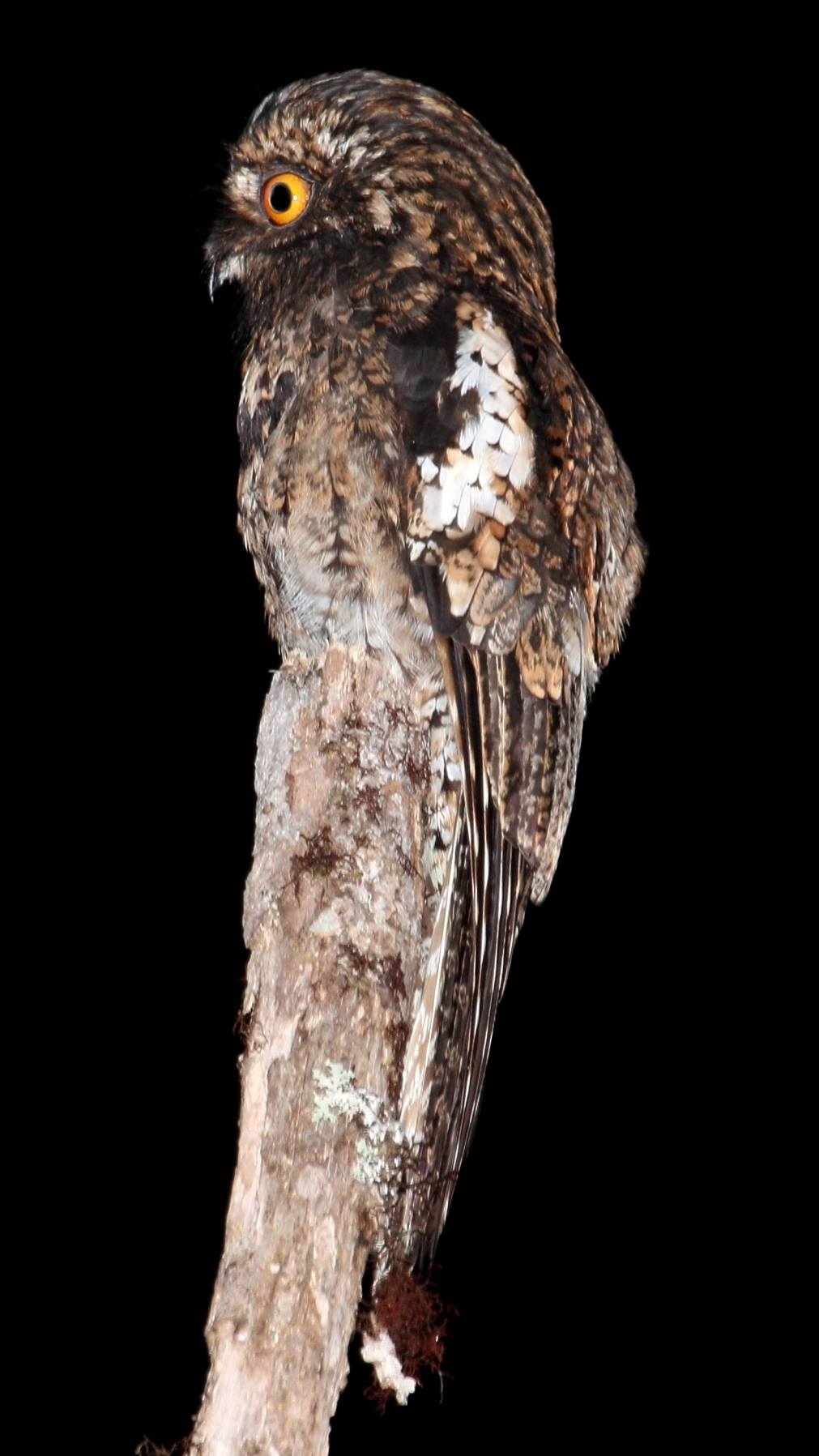

Conservation status
- Least Concern (IUCN 3.1)

Scientific classification
- Kingdom: Animalia
- Phylum: Chordata
- Class: Aves
- Clade: Strisores
- Order: Nyctibiiformes
- Family: Nyctibiidae
- Genus: Nyctibius
- Species: N. maculosus

Binomial name
- Nyctibius maculosus Ridgway, 1912

= Andean potoo =

Species of bird

The Andean potoo (Nyctibius maculosus) is a species of bird in the family Nyctibiidae. It is found in Bolivia, Colombia, Ecuador, Peru, and Venezuela.

== Taxonomy and systematics ==
For a time the Andean potoo was considered a subspecies of the white-winged potoo (Nyctibius leucopterus), but size, plumage, voice, and elevational distribution differentiate them. Those two species, the northern potoo (N. jamaicensis), and the common potoo (N. griseus) are more closely related to each other than to the other potoos. The Andean potoo is monotypic.

== Description ==
The Andean potoo is 34 to 40.5 cm (13 to 16 in) long. One male weighed 195 g (6.9 oz) and two females 145 and 185 g (5.1 and 6.5 oz). The male's upperparts are brown with white, buff, tawny, and black streaks, speckles, and spots. The median wing coverts are white and show as a broad strip on the closed wing. The chin and throat are white or grayish white with a cinnamon wash on the lower throat. The breast is brown with a buff or tawny band separating it from the buffish upper belly and flanks. The breast has blackish brown speckles and the belly and flanks have brown bars and vermiculation. The lower belly is pale buff, cinnamon buff, or whitish and has blackish brown streaks and spots. The female is lighter overall, with more of a buffy or tawny background color, and the wing coverts are buff, not white.

== Distribution and habitat ==
The Andean potoo is known from about a dozen sites along the Andean chain from western Venezuela through Colombia, Ecuador, and Peru into western Bolivia. "This patchy distribution may reflect a truly local distribution, or may reflect the difficulties of detecting a cryptically colored, nocturnal bird in sites with few resident ornithologists." In elevation it mostly ranges between about 1,800 and 2,800 m (5,900 and 9,200 ft); the lowest elevation recorded is 1,400 m (4,600 ft) and the highest 3,200 m (10,500 ft). It inhabits the canopy of the interior and edges of humid montane forest.

== Behavior ==
=== Feeding ===
The Andean potoo is nocturnal. It captures its insect prey by sallying from an exposed perch, but the details of its diet remain unknown.

=== Roosting ===
The Andean potoo roosts during the day on large branches, including those that project above the canopy.

=== Breeding ===
The Andean potoo's breeding phenology is unknown. It is assumed to lay one egg on a branch in the canopy in a manner similar to that of other potoos.

=== Vocalization ===
The Andean potoo's song is "an almost queulous wailing shriek, kwaaaanh, given at intervals of 3-5 seconds". It also produces "a slow, hollow wok wok wok" and "a quieter bu bu bu calls."

== Status ==
The IUCN has assessed the Andean potoo as being of Least Concern, though its population is unknown and believed to be decreasing. It is considered vary rare to rare, though possibly overlooked. Deforestation is a potential threat, but "it can tolerate forest that has been selectively logged."
