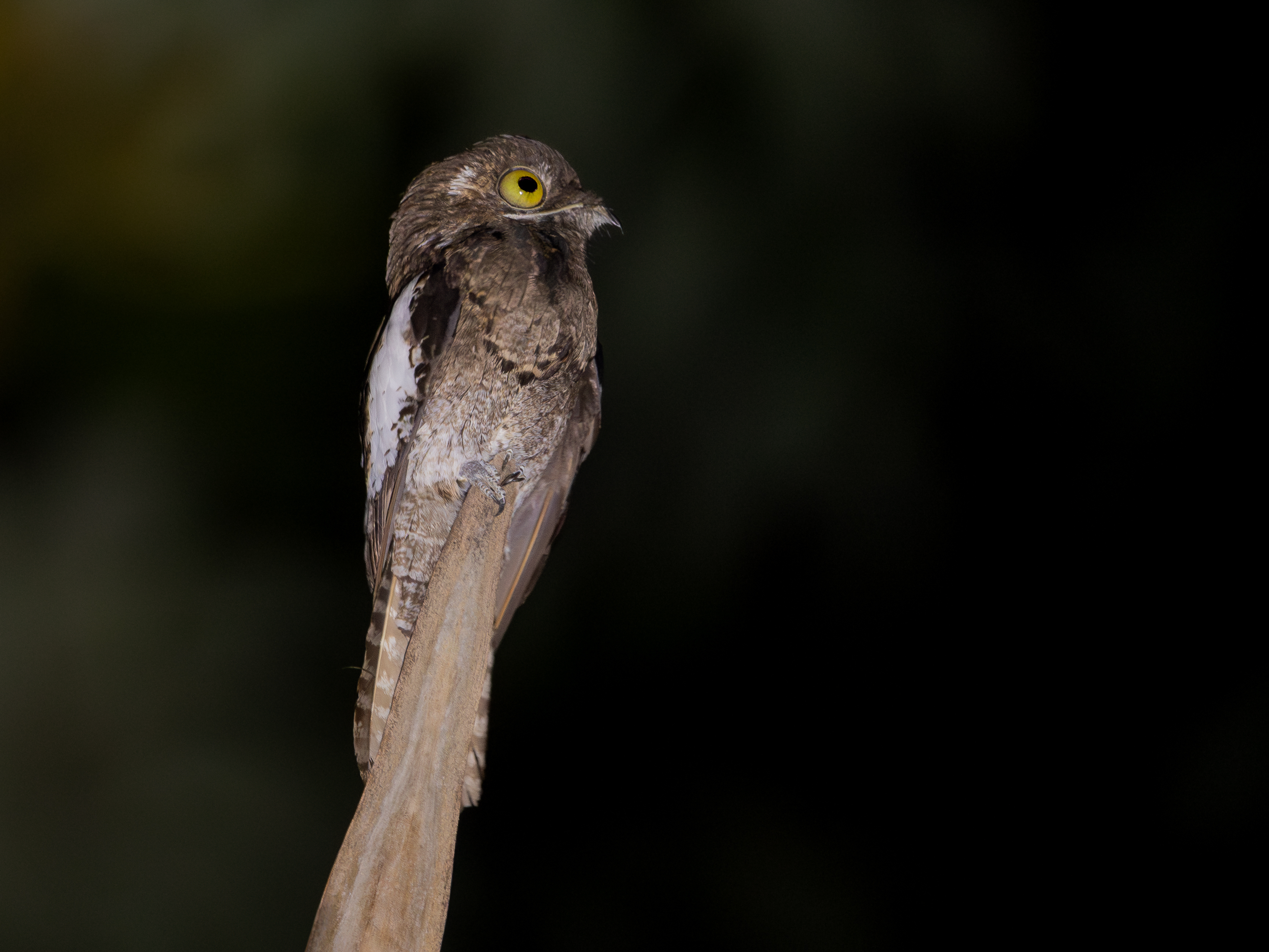

Conservation status
- Least Concern (IUCN 3.1)

Scientific classification
- Kingdom: Animalia
- Phylum: Chordata
- Class: Aves
- Order: Nyctibiiformes
- Family: Nyctibiidae
- Genus: Nyctibius
- Species: N. leucopterus

Binomial name
- Nyctibius leucopterus (Wied, 1821)

= White-winged potoo =

Species of bird

The white-winged potoo (Nyctibius leucopterus) is a species of bird in the family Nyctibiidae. It is found in Brazil, French Guiana, Guyana, Peru, Suriname, and Venezuela.

== Taxonomy and systematics ==
For a time the Andean potoo (Nyctibius maculosus) was considered a subspecies of the white-winged potoo, but size, plumage, voice, and elevational distribution differentiate them. Those two species, the northern potoo (N. jamaicensis), and the common potoo (N. griseus) are more closely related to each other than to the other potoos. The white-winged potoo is (as of 2021) considered to be monotypic, but the Amazonian form might be a species in its own right.

== Description ==
The white-winged potoo has two forms that differ significantly in size but are almost identical otherwise. The species as a whole is 24 to 29 cm (9.4 to 11.4 in) long. The Amazonian form weighs 77 to 85 g (2.7 to 3.0 oz); it is much smaller than the eastern one though the latter's weight has not been documented. Both forms are dark brown above and lighter brown below, and both parts have darker speckles. The large white patch on the secondary wing coverts give the species its name.

== Distribution and habitat ==
The Amazonian form of white-winged potoo is known from scattered sites in the Amazon basin of Eastern Venezuela, eastern Peru, the Guianas, and northern Brazil, though it probably occurs throughout the region. There it inhabits the canopy of mature terra firme rainforest, including forest on white-sand soils. In the early 2000s researchers made several sightings along the Amazon on poor but non-sandy soils between areas of white-sand forest. The eastern form has a much smaller range in Brazil's Bahia and Espírito Santo states. It is not well known but is assumed to inhabit the canopy of the Atlantic Forest.

== Behavior ==
=== Feeding ===
The white-winged potoo is nocturnal. It captures its insect prey by sallying from an exposed perch.

=== Breeding ===
The white-winged potoo's breeding phenology is unknown. It is assumed to lay one egg on a branch high in the canopy in a manner similar to that of other potoos.

=== Vocalization ===
The song of the Amazonian form of white-winged potoo is "a gradually descending, pure-toned 'feeeoooooo'" described as haunting and melancholy. It also makes a soft "bweep" call.

== Status ==
The IUCN has assessed the white-winged potoo as being of Least Concern, though its population is unknown and thought to be decreasing. In Amazonia, "the biggest threat comes from continued destruction of pristine forest."
