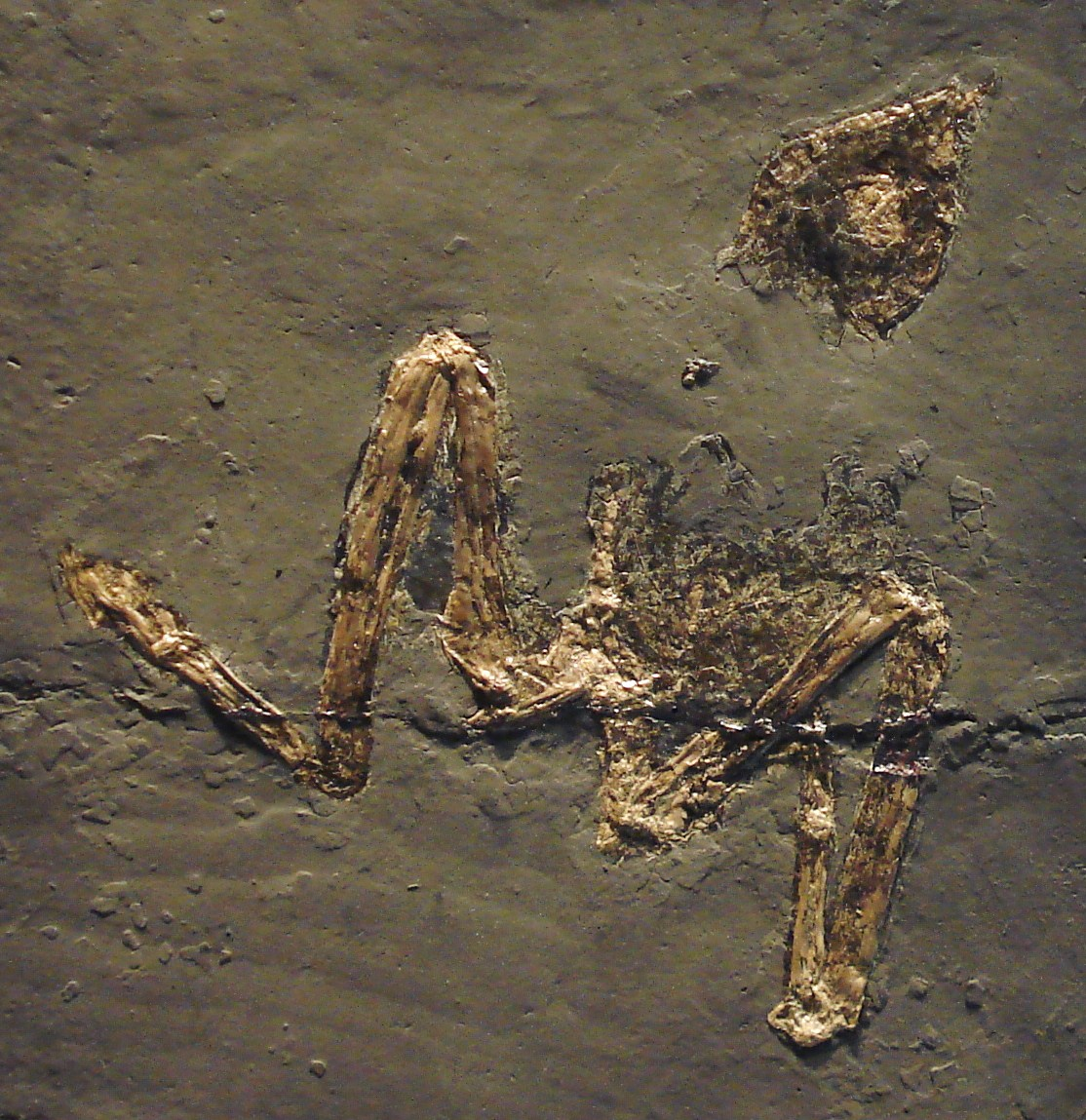
- Fossil from Messel, Germany

Scientific classification
- Kingdom: Animalia
- Phylum: Chordata
- Class: Aves
- Order: Nyctibiiformes
- Family: Nyctibiidae
- Subfamily: †Parapreficinae; Costa, Silviera, James, Posso & Donatelli, 2021
- Genus: †Paraprefica; G. Mayr, 2005

Type species
- Paraprefica major

Species
- P. major Mayr, 1999; P. kelleri Mayr, 1999

= Paraprefica =

Paraprefica Temporal range: Middle Eocene 48 Ma

Extinct genus of birds

Paraprefica is an extinct genus of potoo (family Nyctibiidae) from the middle Eocene (c. 48 million years ago). Its fossil remains have been found in the Messel pit at Messel, Germany.

== Taxonomy ==
It is the only known member of the extinct subfamily Parapreficinae, erected in 2021 to distinguish Paraprefica from the extant potoos of the genus Nyctibius and Phyllaemulor, which have a slightly different anatomy and are known only from the Americas.

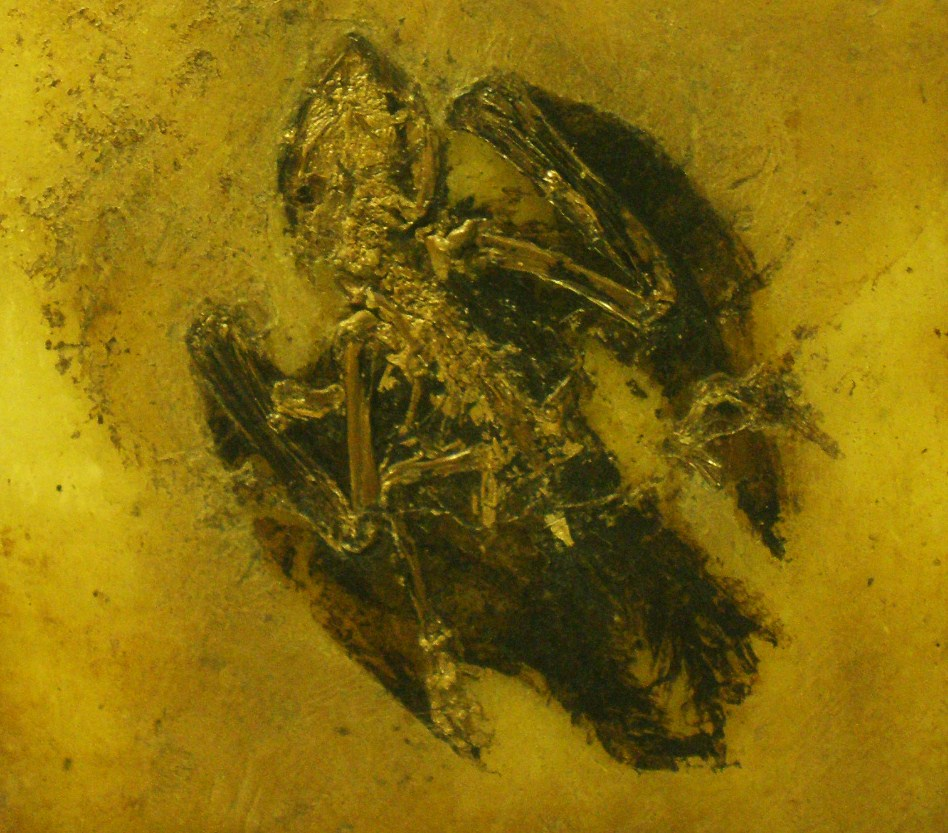
Fossil of Paraprefica kelleri

Described for the first time in 1999 by G. Mayr, this bird was at first placed in the genus Prefica, a North American fossil closely related to modern oilbirds (Steatornis caripensis). Later research showed however that Paraprefica had characteristics found only in the family Nyctibiidae, order Caprimulgiformes (the nightjars).

It is possible that the similarities between the bones of Prefica and Paraprefica are due to primitive characters found in all Cypselomorphs, the group that also includes the Caprimulgiformes. There are two species in the genus: Paraprefica kelleri, the best known, and Paraprefica major.

== Description ==
This bird is known from fossil remains which include a skeleton and many well-preserved skulls, and is one of the best preserved Eocene birds. Paraprefica, a medium-sized bird, has skull and legs somewhat resembling today's potoos, in the genera Nyctibius and Phyllaemulor. The head has a thin beak and a very wide mouth, while the wings are relatively large, though smaller than those of extant potoos.

== Distribution ==
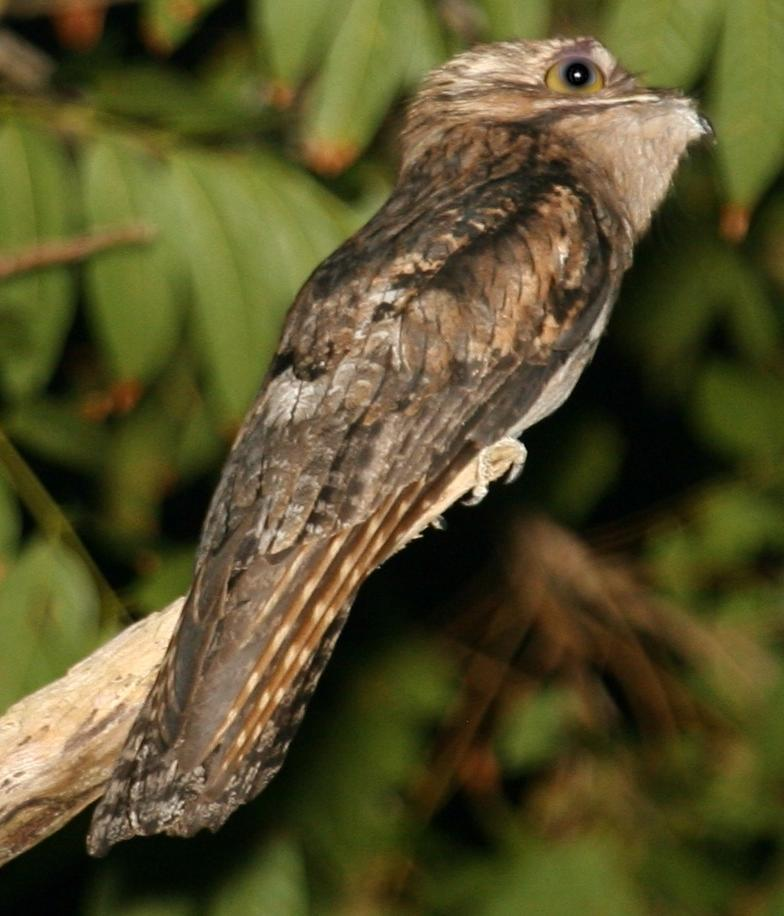
Paraprefica may be a relative of the northern potoo.

The existing finds from Germany present a puzzle on the birds' distribution, as modern potoos are found only in the New World, from Mexico to the north of Argentina and the Caribbean islands of Jamaica, Hispaniola and Tobago, making them Neotropical. Either the group was once cosmopolitan, and has become limited to the Americas, or it was Eurasian and has at some time shifted its distribution.

== Sources ==
- Mayr, G. (1999). Caprimulgiform birds from the Middle Eocene of Messel (Hessen, Germany). Journal of Vertebrate Paleontology 19(3): 521–532.
- Mayr, G. (2005). The Palaeogene Old World Potoo Paraprefica Mayr, 1999 (Aves, Nyctibiidae): its osteology and affinities to the New World Preficinae. Journal of Systematic Palaeontology. 3 (4): 359–370. doi:10.1017/S1477201905001653
- Tudge, C. (2011). The Link: Uncovering Our Earliest Ancestor. Hachette.
