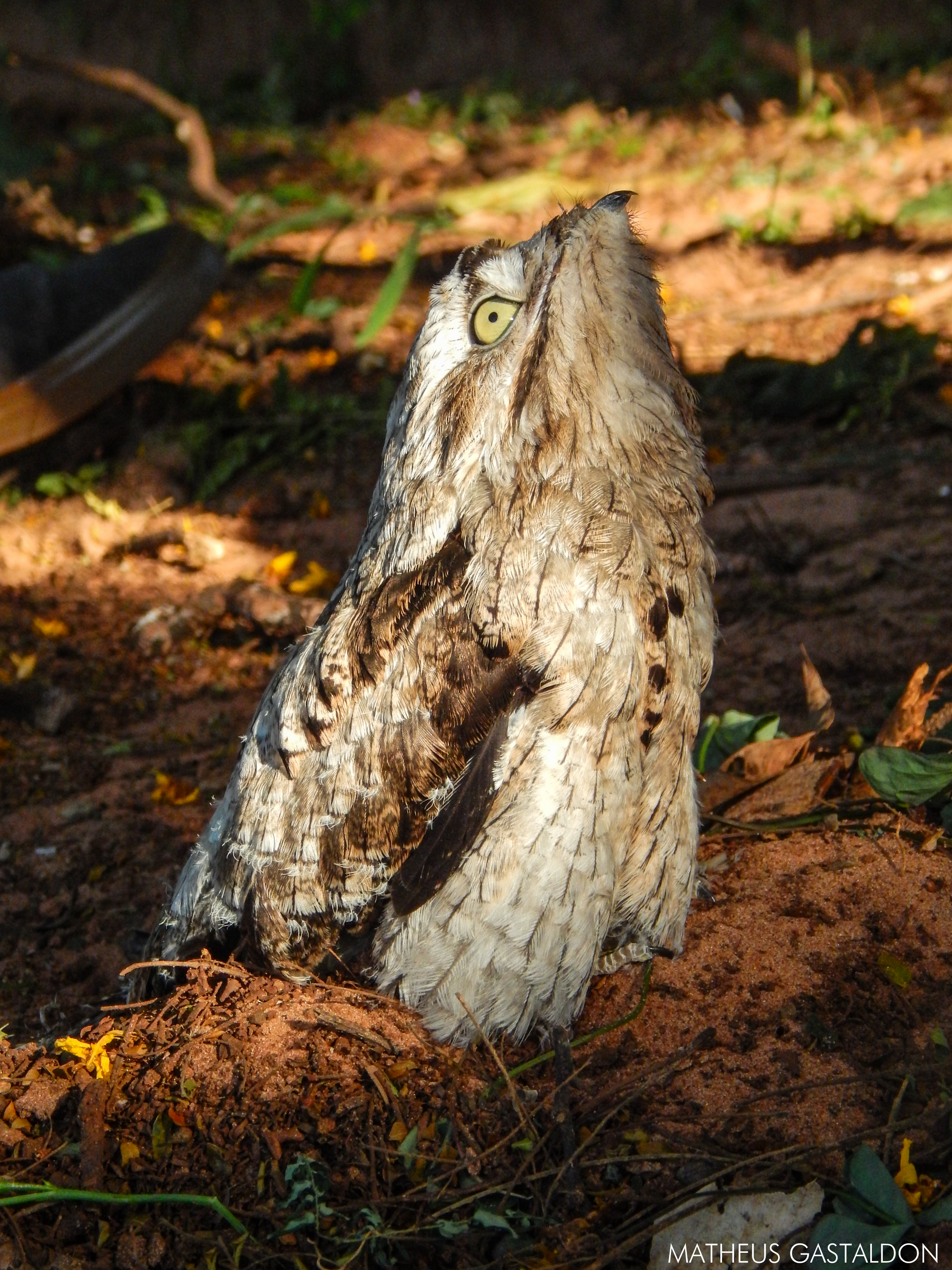
- Common potoo (N. griseus)

Scientific classification
- Kingdom: Animalia
- Phylum: Chordata
- Class: Aves
- Clade: Strisores
- Order: Nyctibiiformes
- Family: Nyctibiidae
- Subfamily: Nyctibiinae
- Genus: Nyctibius; Vieillot, 1816

Type species
- Caprimulgus grandis (great potoo) Gmelin, JF, 1789

Species
- See text

= Nyctibius =

Genus of nocturnal birds of tropical Central and South America

Nyctibius is a genus of potoos, nocturnal birds in the family Nyctibiidae. They are found in Mexico, Central and South America.

== Taxonomy ==
The genus Nyctibius was introduced in 1816 by the French ornithologist Louis Pierre Vieillot to accommodate a single species, Comte de Buffon's "Le Grand Engoulevent de Cayenne", the great potoo, which thus becomes the type species. The genus name is from Ancient Greek nuktibios meaning "night-feeding", from nux night and bios "life".

They are one of two genera in the family, the other being the monotypic genus Phyllaemulor (containing only the rufous potoo). Prior to 2018, they were considered the only extant genus within the Nyctibiidae; however, a study that year found a deep divergence between the rufous potoo and all other species in the genus, leading it to be described in a new genus and expanding the number of genera within the family. This was followed by the International Ornithological Congress in 2022.

== Distribution ==
They are found throughout much of Mexico, Central America, South America, and parts of the Caribbean.

== Species ==
The genus Nyctibius contains six species:

Image	Common name	Scientific name	Distribution
	Great potoo	Nyctibius grandis	
	Long-tailed potoo	Nyctibius aethereus	
	Common potoo	Nyctibius griseus	
	Northern potoo	Nyctibius jamaicensis	
	Andean potoo	Nyctibius maculosus	
	White-winged potoo	Nyctibius leucopterus	
