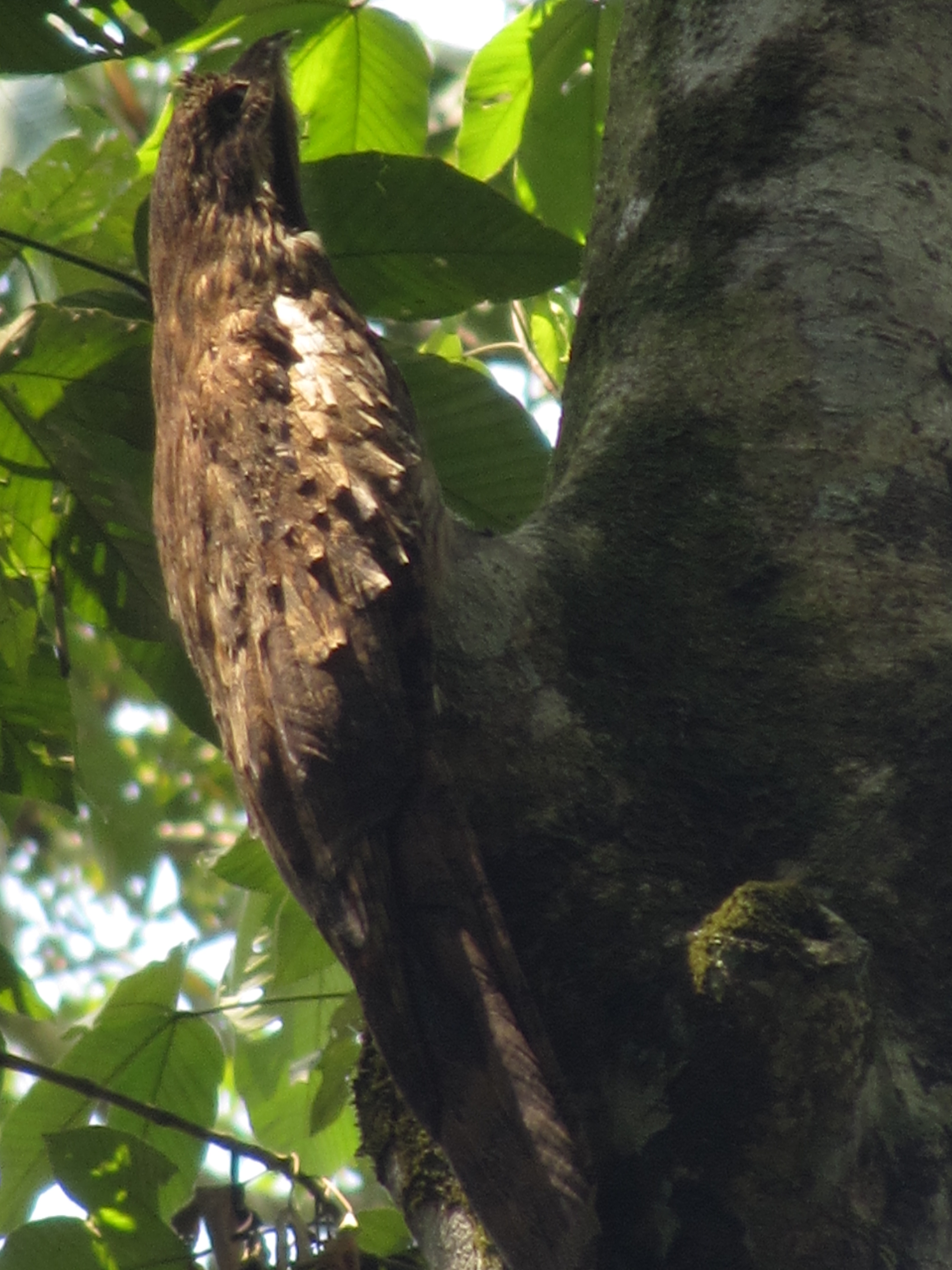
- in the Amazon, Peru

Conservation status
- Least Concern (IUCN 3.1)

Scientific classification
- Kingdom: Animalia
- Phylum: Chordata
- Class: Aves
- Order: Nyctibiiformes
- Family: Nyctibiidae
- Genus: Nyctibius
- Species: N. aethereus

Binomial name
- Nyctibius aethereus (Wied, 1820)

= Long-tailed potoo =

Species of bird

The long-tailed potoo (Nyctibius aethereus) is a species of bird in the family Nyctibiidae. It is found in every mainland South American country except Chile and Uruguay.

== Taxonomy and systematics ==
The long-tailed potoo has three subspecies, the nominate Nyctibius aethereus aethereus, N. a. chocoensis, and N. a. longicaudatus. Several authors maintain that longicaudatus should be treated as a separate species with chocoensis as a subspecies of it.

== Description ==
The long-tailed potoo is 42 to 58 cm (17 to 23 in) long and weighs 280 to 447 g (9.9 to 15.8 oz). The nominate subspecies' upperparts are tawny brown. The crown and nape have buff spots and speckles and blackish brown streaks. The mantle, back, and rump are mottled brown and buff and have blackish brown streaks. The tail is graduated and overall brown, with tawny buff barring and brown streaks or vermiculation. Much of the face is tawny and it has a buffish "moustache". The wings are generally brown with broad pale tawny bars. The chin and throat are grayish buff. The breast and flanks are brown with buff speckles, blackish brown streaks, and bold buff and blackish brown spots. The lower belly is buff with brown streaks and vermiculation.

N. a. longicaudatus is smaller than the nominate subspecies; often it is a more tawny brown overall and especially on the breast. N. a. chocoensis is smaller than longicaudatus but darker. The black streaks on the upperparts are larger and bolder and the brown base color tends towards chestnut.

== Distribution and habitat ==
The nominate subspecies of long-tailed potoo is found in far northeastern Argentina, southeastern Paraguay, and southeastern Brazil approximately from Minas Gerais and southern Bahia south to Paraná. N. a. chocoensis is found only in western Colombia's Chocó Department. N. a. longicaudatus is by far the most widely distributed. It is found in Amazonia from Ecuador and Peru east through southern Colombia and Venezuela to the Guianas, in far northern Bolivia, and in much of western Brazil.

The long-tailed potoo inhabits the interiors of lowland tropical evergreen forests. It is usually found from the understory to the subcanopy. The forests range in humidity from rather dry to very wet. In the Atlantic Forest region, the nominate subspecies is found as high as 1,200 m (3,900 ft). The other subspecies occur at lower elevations, reaching only 700 m (2,300 ft) in Ecuador and 750 m (2,460 ft) in Peru.

== Behavior ==
=== Feeding ===
The long-tailed potoo is nocturnal. It forages by sallying for flying insects in short flights from a perch, looking "clumsy and over-sized". Its diet has not been detailed but is known to include termites, moths, and beetles.

=== Roosting ===
The long-tailed potoo roosts during the day, usually on a dead stub or branch up to 20 m (66 ft) above the ground. If approached it stretches its body vertically and freezes.

=== Breeding ===
The nesting season of the long-tailed potoo has not been fully defined. In Paraguay, one nest was active from late August through November. In French Guiana nesting was reported between July and September. The species does not make a conventional nest, but lays its single egg on top of a stump or on a branch in a depression or bend.

=== Vocalization ===
The long-tailed potoo's song is "a soft, undulating waa-OO-uh or ra-OOH", and is sung mostly at night and especially on moonlit ones. It also makes "a distinctive series of owl-like hoots or woof notes."

== Status ==
The IUCN has assessed the long-tailed potoo as being of Least Concern, though its population is unknown and believed to be decreasing. Though N. a. longicaudatus has a very large range, Amazonia is undergoing increasing deforestation. The other two subspecies have very limited ranges and the Atlantic Forest habitat of the nominate subspecies has been reduced to remnants.
