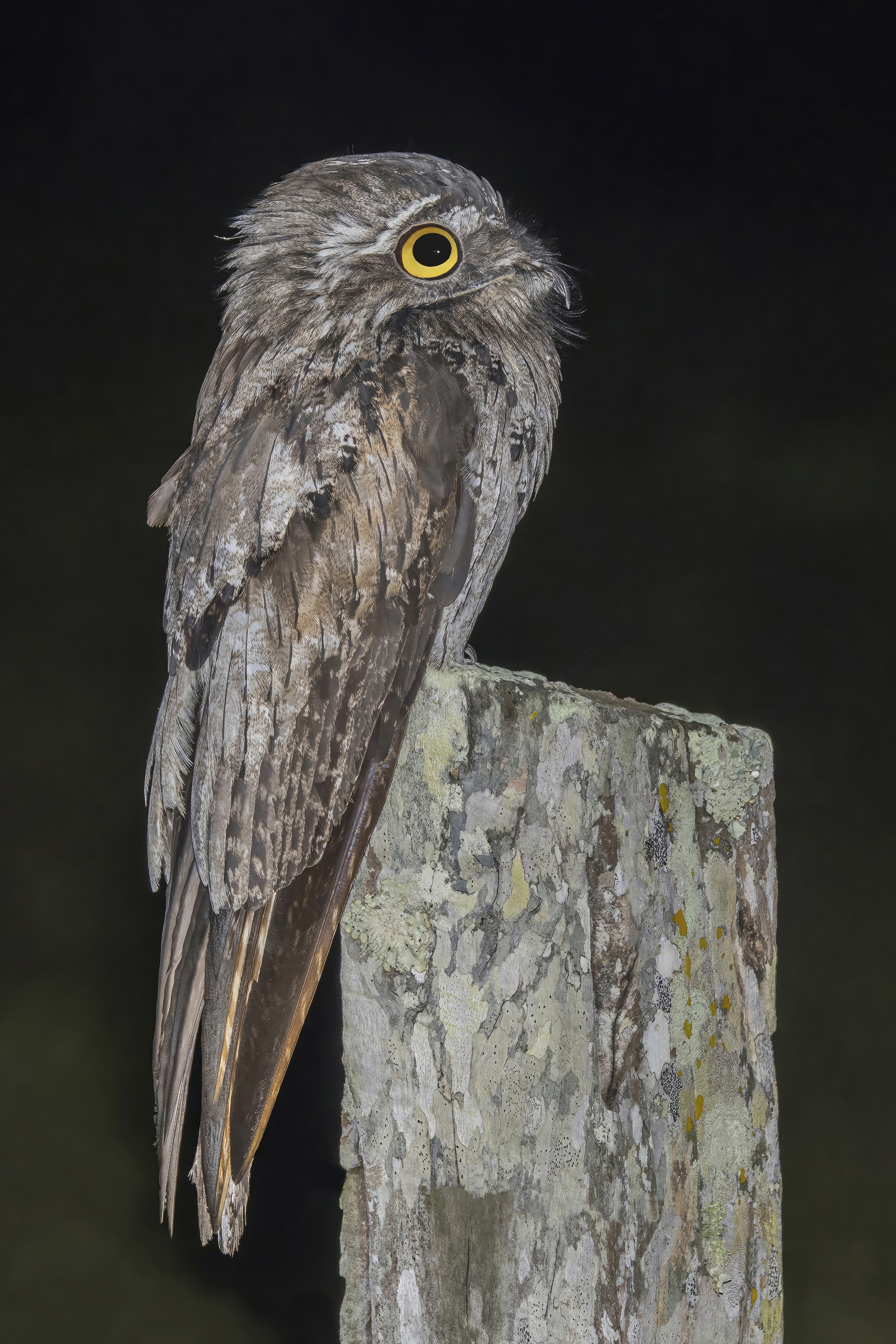
- Nyctibius jamaicensis mexicanus, Belize

Conservation status
- Least Concern (IUCN 3.1)

Scientific classification
- Kingdom: Animalia
- Phylum: Chordata
- Class: Aves
- Clade: Strisores
- Order: Nyctibiiformes
- Family: Nyctibiidae
- Genus: Nyctibius
- Species: N. jamaicensis

Binomial name
- Nyctibius jamaicensis (Gmelin, JF, 1789)

= Northern potoo =

Species of bird

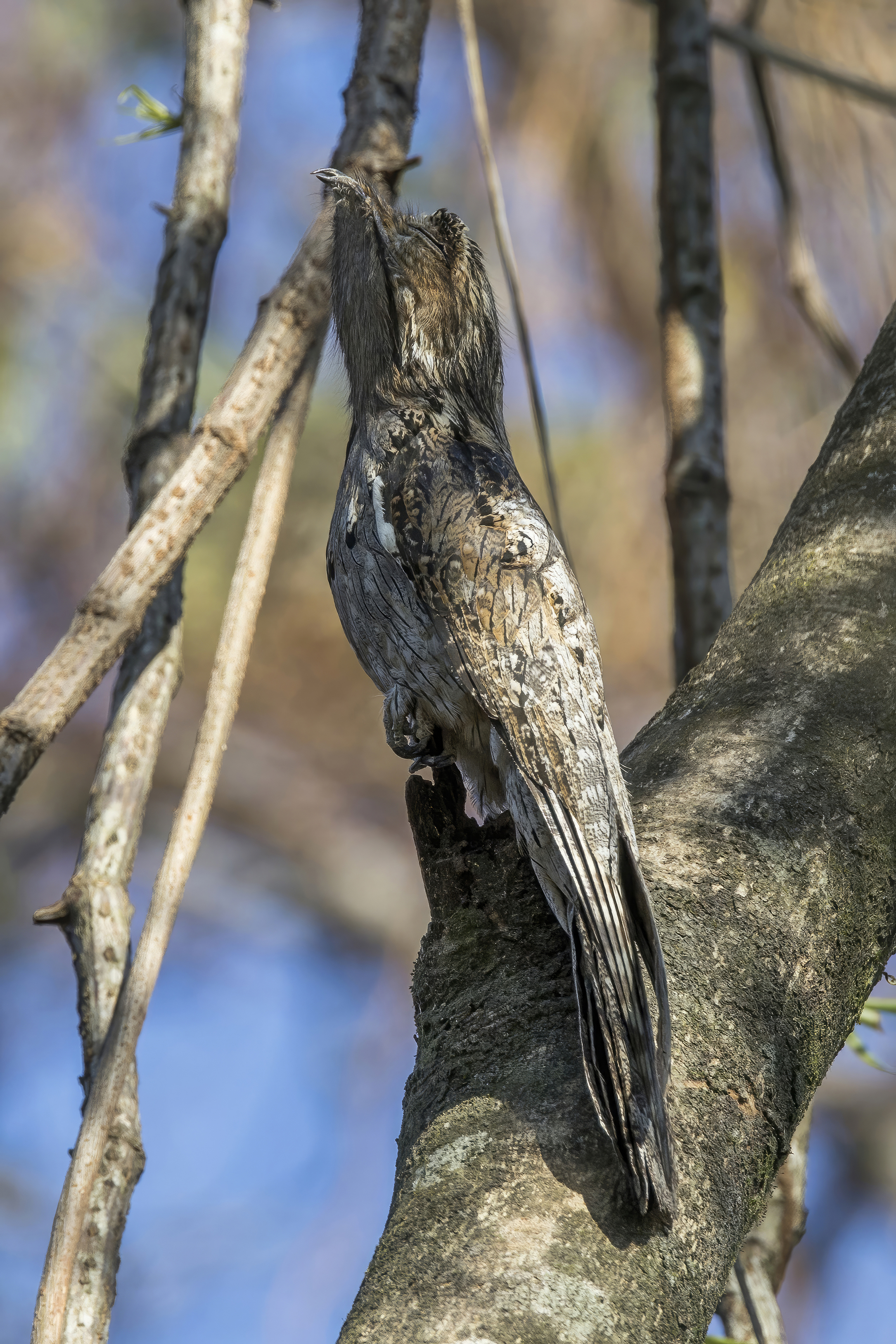
N. j. mexicanus roosting

The northern potoo (Nyctibius jamaicensis) is a nocturnal bird belonging to the potoo family, Nyctibiidae. It is found from Mexico south to Costa Rica, and on the islands of Jamaica and Hispaniola (in the Dominican Republic and Haiti). It was formerly classified as a subspecies of the common potoo (Nyctibius griseus) but is now usually treated as a separate species based on differences in vocalizations.

== Taxonomy ==
The northern potoo was formally described in 1789 by the German naturalist Johann Friedrich Gmelin in his revised and expanded edition of Carl Linnaeus's Systema Naturae. He placed it with all the nightjar like species in the genus Caprimulgus and coined the binomial name Caprimulgus jamaicensis. Gmelin based his description on earlier accounts of the bird in Jamaica, including Hans Sloane's "Wood owle" published in 1725 and John Latham's "Jamaican goatsucker" published in 1783. The northern potoo is now one of the seven potoos placed in the genus Nyctibius that was introduced in 1816 by the French ornithologist Louis Pierre Vieillot. The genus name is from Ancient Greek nuktibios meaning "night-feeding", from nux night and bios "life". The specific epithet is from the toponym, Jamaica, the type locality.

The northern potoo was formerly classified as a subspecies of the common potoo (Nyctibius griseus), but since 1995 it has usually been treated as a separate species based on the differences in vocalizations.

=== Subspecies ===
Five subspecies as recognised:

- Nyctibius jamaicensis lambi Davis, J, 1959 – west Mexico
- Nyctibius jamaicensis mexicanus Nelson, 1900 – east, south Mexico to Honduras
- Nyctibius jamaicensis costaricensis Ridgway, 1912 – Costa Rica
- Nyctibius jamaicensis jamaicensis (Gmelin, JF, 1789) – nominate subspecies - Jamaica
- Nyctibius jamaicensis abbotti Richmond, 1917 – Hispaniola and Gonâve Island

== Description ==
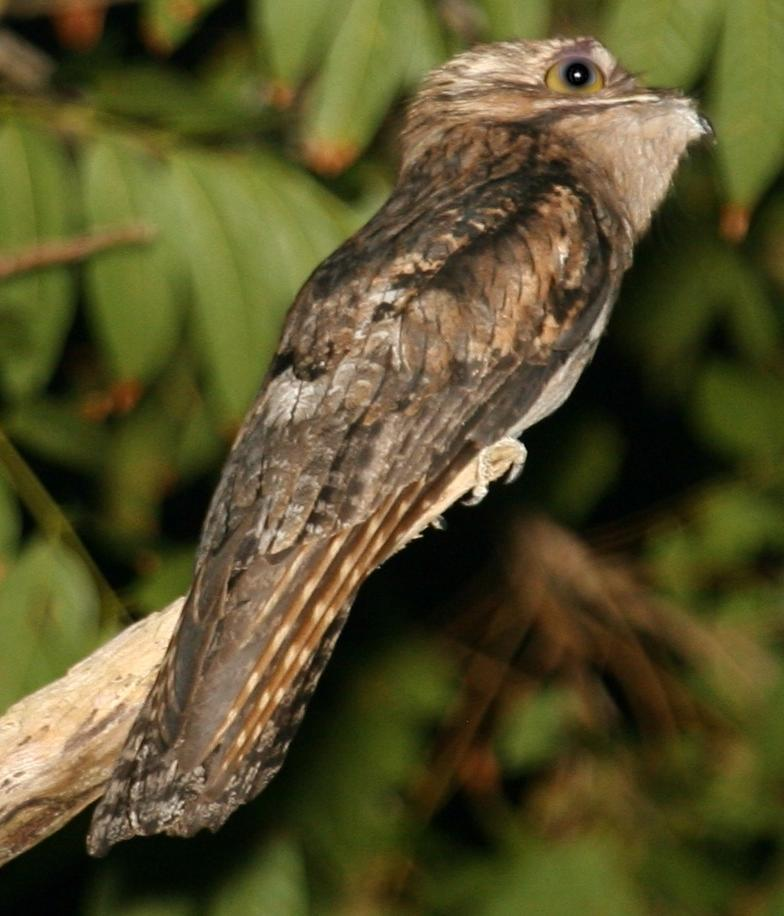
Northern potoo

It is a fairly large bird with a length of 38–46 centimetres. It has a long tail, long pointed wings, large head, very short legs and a small bill with a large gape. It is most commonly seen perched motionless in an upright position on branches or posts. The plumage is grey-brown with an intricate pattern of black, grey and cream markings. The cheeks are pale with a dark malar stripe below them. The large eye has a yellow iris which can shine red in light at night. The bird's calls are hoarse and guttural. The common potoo is virtually identical in appearance, but has a very different voice consisting of a series of mournful, wailing whistles. The great potoo is larger and paler, with no dark malar stripe.

The song is a "rough, squalling kwaaah, kwa-kwa-kwa". It also makes "an abrupt, emphatic rrah!" and "a barking alarm call".

== Distribution and habitat ==
The five subspecies are distributed across Central America and the Caribbean. It mainly occurs in lowland areas where it inhabits woodland and scrubland with clearings and farmland with scattered trees. It is sometimes seen around golf courses and urban areas. It is known as an occasional visitor to Puerto Rico, and particularly to its outlying islands in the Mona Passage, and its permanent presence in Cuba is unconfirmed, but reported.

== Behavior and ecology ==
=== Breeding ===
A single egg is laid on a broken branch with no nest material used. Both parents are involved in incubating the egg and feeding the young bird.

=== Food and feeding ===
It feeds on large insects such as moths or beetles. It hunts from a perch, sitting and waiting for prey then sallying out to catch it in flight.

== Status ==
The IUCN has assessed the northern potoo as being of Least Concern. It has a large range and a population exceeding 50,000 mature individuals, though that number is believed to be decreasing.

The Mopan people believe that if a northern potoo (Mopán: ajsooch’) flies over a person's house repeatedly at night, someone in that family will die. To prevent this, they chase the birds away with lighted sticks, whose embers are said to repel the bird. p
