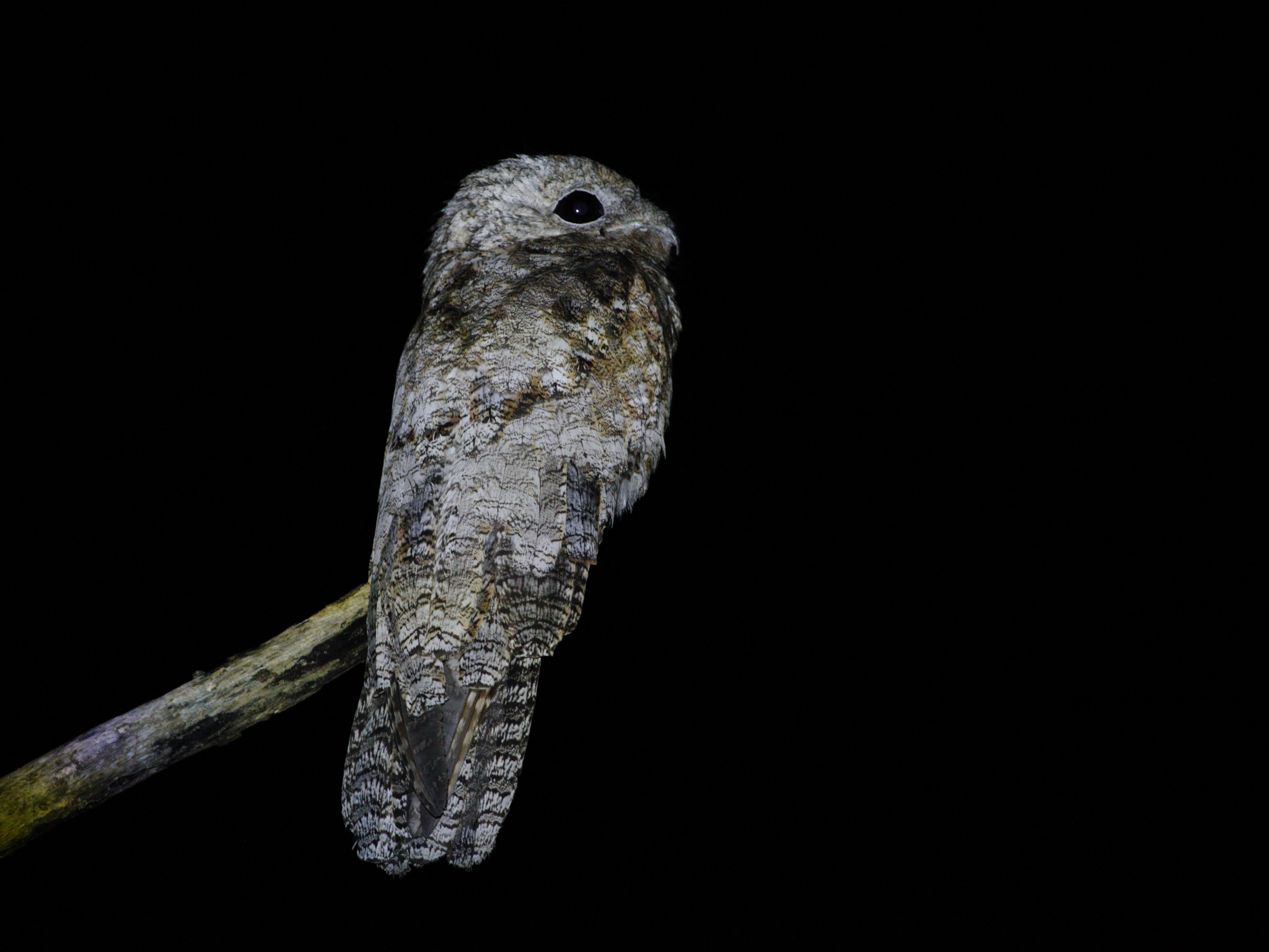
- In Brazil

Conservation status
- Least Concern (IUCN 3.1)

Scientific classification
- Kingdom: Animalia
- Phylum: Chordata
- Class: Aves
- Order: Nyctibiiformes
- Family: Nyctibiidae
- Genus: Nyctibius
- Species: N. grandis

Binomial name
- Nyctibius grandis (Gmelin, JF, 1789)

Audio

= Great potoo =

Species of bird

The great potoo or grand potoo (Nyctibius grandis) is the largest potoo species and is widely distributed in Central and South America.

Much like owls, this species is nocturnal. It preys on large insects and small vertebrates, which it captures in sallies from high perches.

The great potoo is best known for its distinctive moaning growl, which echoes through the Neotropical night.

== Taxonomy ==
The great potoo was formally described in 1789 by the German naturalist Johann Friedrich Gmelin in his revised and expanded edition of Carl Lineus's Systema Naturae. He placed it with all the nightjar like species in the genus Caprimulgus and coined the binomial name Caprimulgus grandis. The great potoo is now one of the seven potoos placed in the genus Nyctibius that was introduced in 1816 by the French ornithologist Louis Pierre Vieillot. The genus name is from Ancient Greek nuktibios meaning "night-living", from nux "night" and bios "life". The species is monotypic: no subspecies are recognised.

== Distribution and habitat ==
They range from southern Mexico through northeastern Guatemala and through most of Central America down through South America as far as southeastern Brazil and Bolivia.

In general, the great potoo are distributed from humid to semi-humid forested habitats. While this species is widely spread out geographically, there is little to no variation in their appearance, such as size or plumage. The great potoo is found mostly in dense lowland forests, forest edges, and clearings. It may also range into foothills (up to about 1,500 m elevation), second-growth, open woodlands (including plantations) and is sometimes seen around meadows, but they always require trees-etc., for their camouflaged imitative perch.

In the day, they are normally found perching or nesting, usually higher than 12 meters (39 ft) above ground level within big trees. The branches they choose to perch on are usually 20 to 30 centimeters (7.9 to 11.8 in) in diameter. At night time, they may go to lower perches 1.5 meters (4.9 ft) above the ground, from which they hunt.

== Description ==
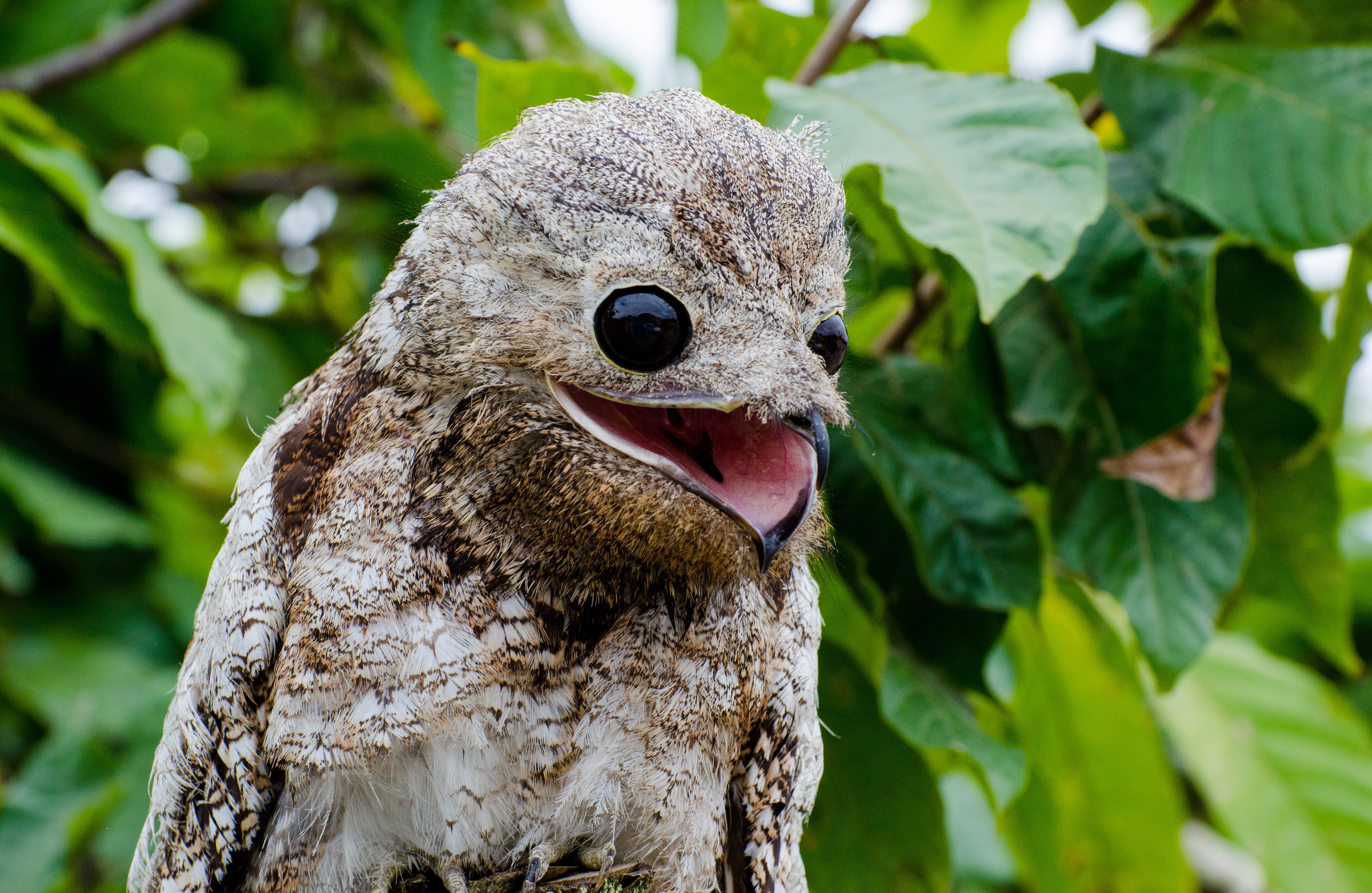
Great potoo, with its beak open

The great potoo has a large head in relation to its body, large, dark brown eyes, and a short but broad beak. Their wings are elliptical in shape, their tail is elongated, and their feathers are white, gray, black, and burgundy. The tail colors match with that of the rest of the body, with the exception of white bars that can be seen going across the tail laterally.

- Range in mass: 360 to 650 g (13 to 23 oz)
- Range in length: 480 to 600 mm (19 to 24 in)
- Range in wingspan: 700 to 804 mm (27.6 to 31.7 in)
- Average wingspan: 734.8 mm (28.93 in)

== Behavior ==
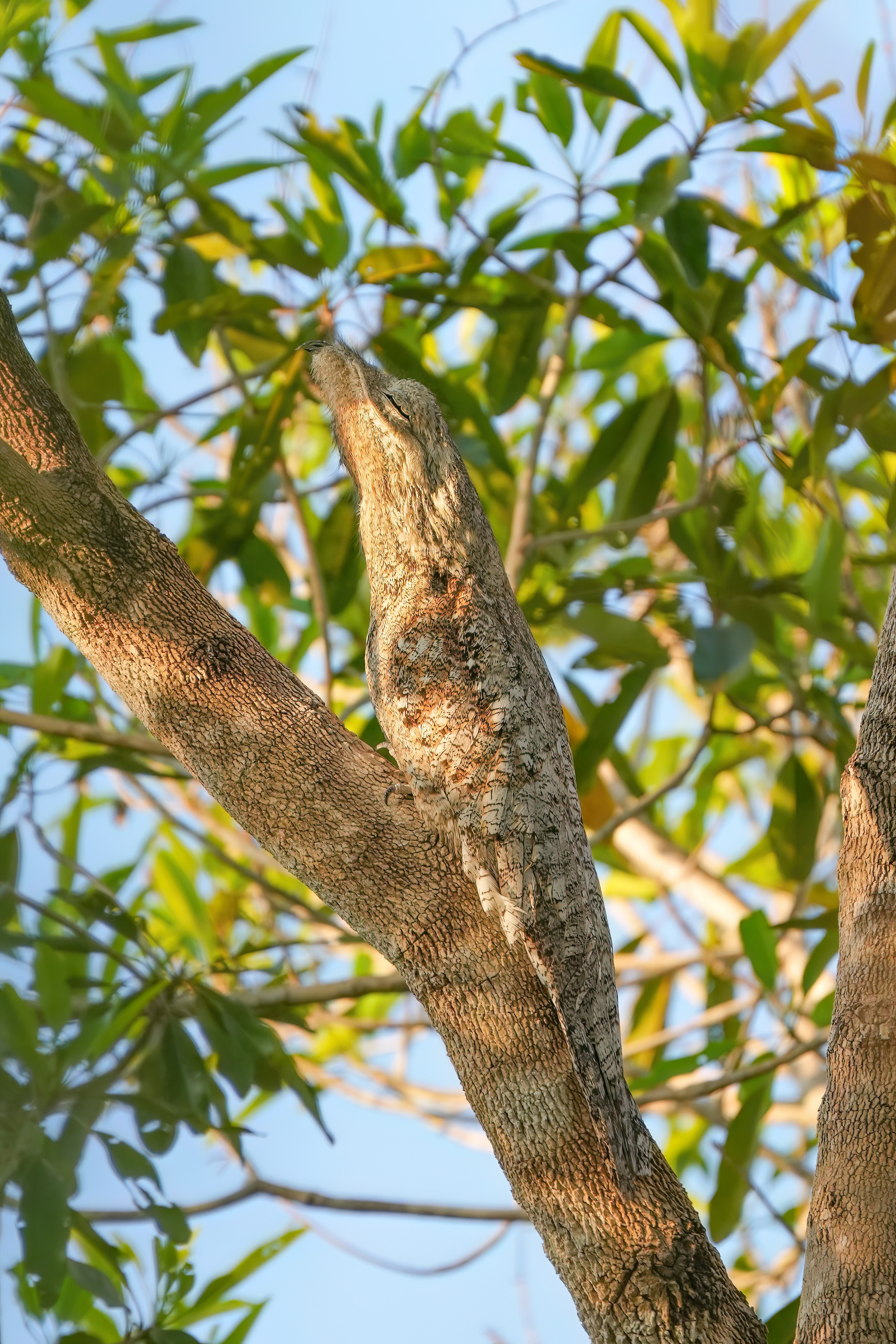
In Mato Grosso, Brazil

In the Pantanal, Brazil

This nocturnal predator is usually seen perched high above the ground while foraging, hawking when prey is spotted. After the pounce, the potoo almost always returns to its previous perch. Normally, during the day, it perches upright on a tree stump and is overlooked because it resembles part of the stump; this is a camouflage, not just by coloration, but a camouflage by the setting. The Great Potoo can be located at night by the reflection of light from its eyes as it sits vertically on a post, roost, or angled tree trunk. Great potoos are shy and solitary creatures. However, they have begun to perch on man-made things such as plastic bottles. This proves how people continue to affect wildlife and natural habitats in the present day.

=== Breeding ===
Breeding has been recorded as typically February to August, but depending on the portion of this bird's range breeding birds can be met with almost year-round. The nest is a slight depression on a thick tree branch, at least 10 m (33 ft) above ground, with a single white (slightly spotted) egg measuring about 5.2 cm × 3.8 cm (2.0 in × 1.5 in). Few details are known of the brooding behavior, but about a month elapses before the offspring is seen alone at the nest. A chick of a few days old weighed 220 g (7.8 oz). After about 5 weeks the nestling is a two-thirds version of the adult, but with a lighter build, paler plumage, shorter tail, and smaller bill with less rictal bristles. The fledging period must be at least 2 months. After this time span, the offspring do not return to the nest site.

Although the adult potoo likely has few natural predators, predation of eggs, nestlings and fledging is apparently not uncommon. Adults stay near the nest throughout the day and rely upon camouflage to protect their offspring. Predators, while not confirmed, of great potoo nests in Costa Rica have included monkeys such as mantled howlers, Geoffroy's spider monkeys and white-headed capuchins as well as tayras and collared forest falcons.

=== Feeding ===
Their prey consists mostly of large flying insects, especially large beetles, katydids and Orthoptera (including crickets and grasshoppers). Bats and birds are taken occasionally as well. The great potoo takes advantage of the night and its natural camouflage by sitting on an exposed perch to wait until some prey flies by, at which point it darts out towards the prey and returns to the branch with it. Very often birds of this species will use the same hunting perch nightly.

== Conservation ==
According to the International Union for Conservation of Nature (IUCN), due to its large range, the great potoo is seen as a species of least concern. Although it is normally described as "uncommon", it occurs frequently in areas of less disturbed forests and is often found to be rare along the edges of its range. Forest clearing is the only conservation threat known to this bird.

The local people in the rural area of Brazil sometimes use potoo as a minor food source, as they do not offer much meat and are hard to locate. In these areas, their feathers are believed to have powers to provide chastity, so they are hunted down for their body parts, which are used to perform ceremonies. It is also believed that parts of their body ward off seduction. Potoos fear most locals due to being hunted.
