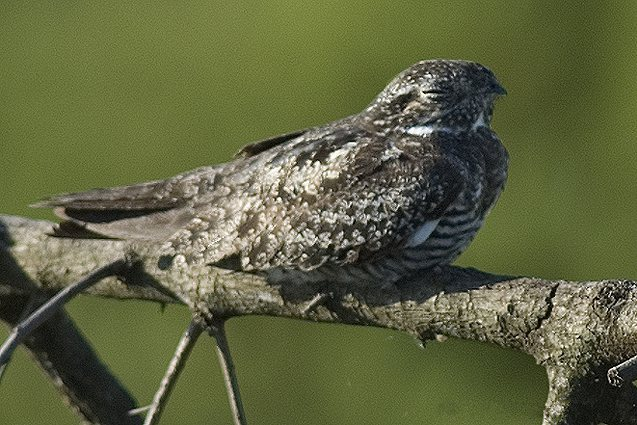
- Common nighthawk, Chordeiles minor (Caprimulgidae)
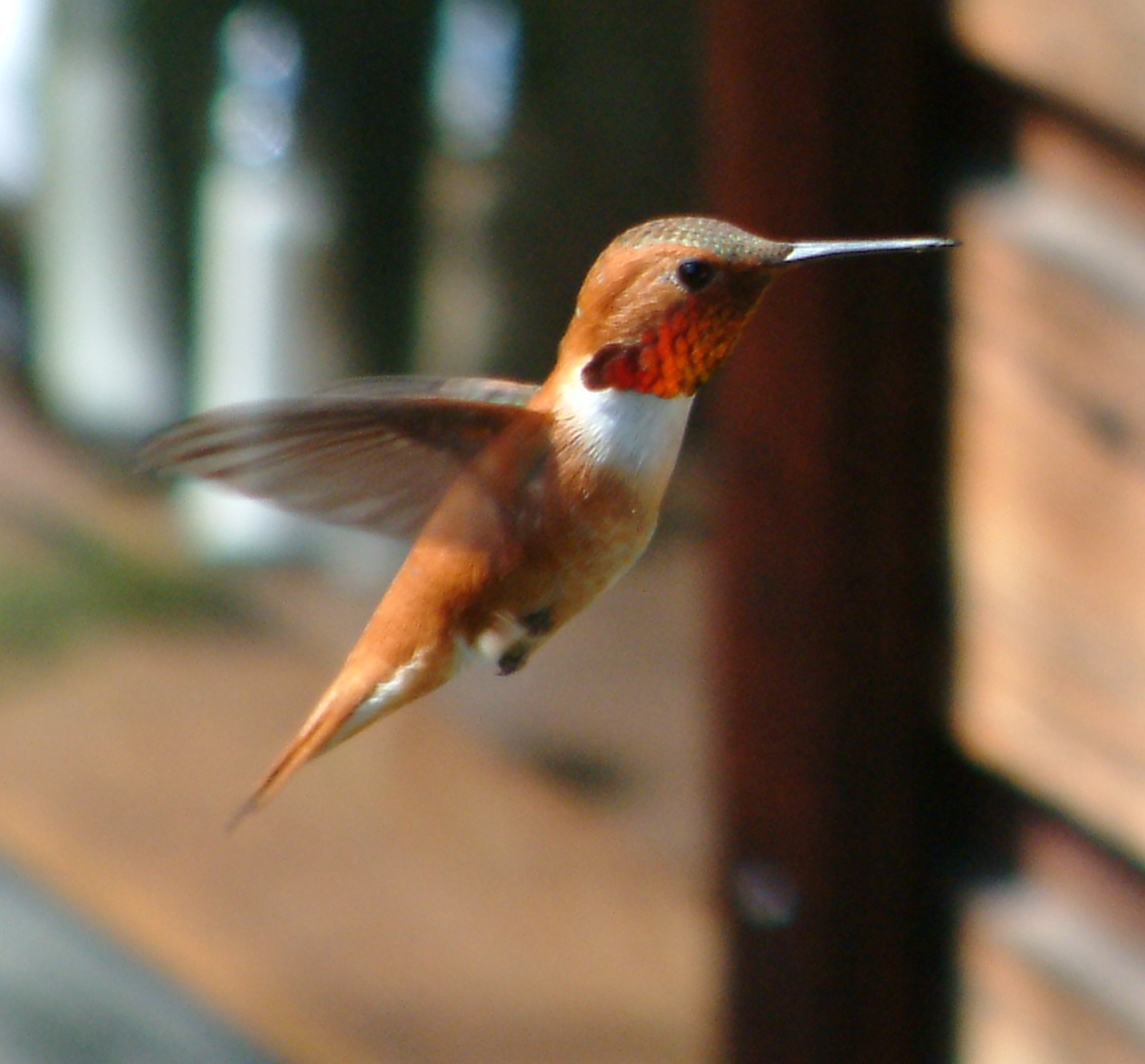
- Male rufous hummingbird, Selasphorus rufus (Trochilidae)

Scientific classification
- Kingdom: Animalia
- Phylum: Chordata
- Class: Aves
- Clade: Neoaves
- Clade: Strisores; Cabanis, 1847

Orders
- Traditional two orders: Apodiformes; Caprimulgiformes; Single order: Caprimulgiformes; Multiple orders: Caprimulgiformes; Vanescaves; Nyctibiiformes; Steatornithiformes; Letornithes; Podargiformes; Apodimorphae; Aegotheliformes; Apodiformes

= Strisores =

Strisores Temporal range: Early Eocene - Holocene, 51–0 Ma Possibly an earlier origin based on molecular clock

Clade of birds

Strisores (/straɪˈsoʊriːz/ stry-SOH-reez), sometimes called nightbirds, is a clade of birds that includes the living families and orders Caprimulgidae (nightjars, nighthawks and allies), Nyctibiidae (potoos), Steatornithidae (oilbirds), Podargidae (frogmouths), Apodiformes (swifts and hummingbirds), as well as the Aegotheliformes (owlet-nightjars) whose distinctness was only recently realized. The Apodiformes (which include the "Trochiliformes" of the Sibley–Ahlquist taxonomy) and the Aegotheliformes form the Daedalornithes.

== Description ==
The material evidence for this group is very equivocal; the most ancient Strisores are quite nondescript tree-dwellers but already tend towards peculiarly apomorphic feet, and no Cretaceous fossils are known. Torpor and other metabolic peculiarities are frequently found in this group, perhaps more often than in any other bird lineage. The synapomorphies that define this clade are the ossa maxillaria separated by a large cleft, a mandible with short pars symphysialis, and rami mandibulae slender in their distal half.

== Taxonomic history ==
The taxonomy of this group of birds has a long and complicated history. Jean Cabanis originally coined the name Strisores in 1847 as an order encompassing a much broader group of birds subdivided into two 'tribes': the Macrochires (hummingbirds, swifts, and nightjars, including oilbirds and potoos, but notably excluding frogmouths) and the Amphibolae (hoatzin, mousebirds, and turacos). Hermann Burmeister later excluded the taxa in Cabanis' Amphibolae from Strisores, but added kingfishers and motmots. Subsequent authors used either definition according to their own judgement, with Baird following Cabanis', and Cooper following Burmeister's usage. In 1867, Thomas Henry Huxley proposed the name Cypselomorphae for hummingbirds, swifts, and nightjars (including owlet-nightjars and potoos), however, he considered frogmouths and oilbirds unrelated due to aspects of their skull morphology. In the 1880s Anton Reichenow continued to use Strisores in a similar sense as Huxley's Cypselomorphae (this time also excluding the owlet-nightjars), but by the late 19th Century, Strisores had fallen into disuse, and this remained the case through the 20th Century.

By the early 21st century, analyses of anatomical morphology and molecular phylogenomics demonstrated that the order Caprimulgiformes as had been used for much of the 20th century (oilbirds, potoos, nightjars, frogmouths, and owlet-nightjars) is actually paraphyletic respective to Apodiformes (hummingbirds, swifts, and treeswifts), with apodiform birds nesting deeply within caprimulgiformes and a sister taxon to the owlet-nightjars. The discovery has led to a challenge of reconciling a Linnean hierarchy with phylogenetic relationships while still maintaining nomenclatural stability, resulting in a complicated situation where some researchers currently use the resurrected name Strisores in a new sense, others expand the order Caprimulgiformes to include the 'traditional' apodiform families, whereas others use the superordinal name Caprimulgimorphae Cracraft, 2013, raising the 'traditional' caprimulgiform families to the rank of order.

Proposed phylogenetic definitions of Strisores and Caprimulgimorphae treat Strisores as the crown group and Caprimulgimorphae as the total group. This allows both names to be valid, with similar but not identical meanings.

== Evolution ==
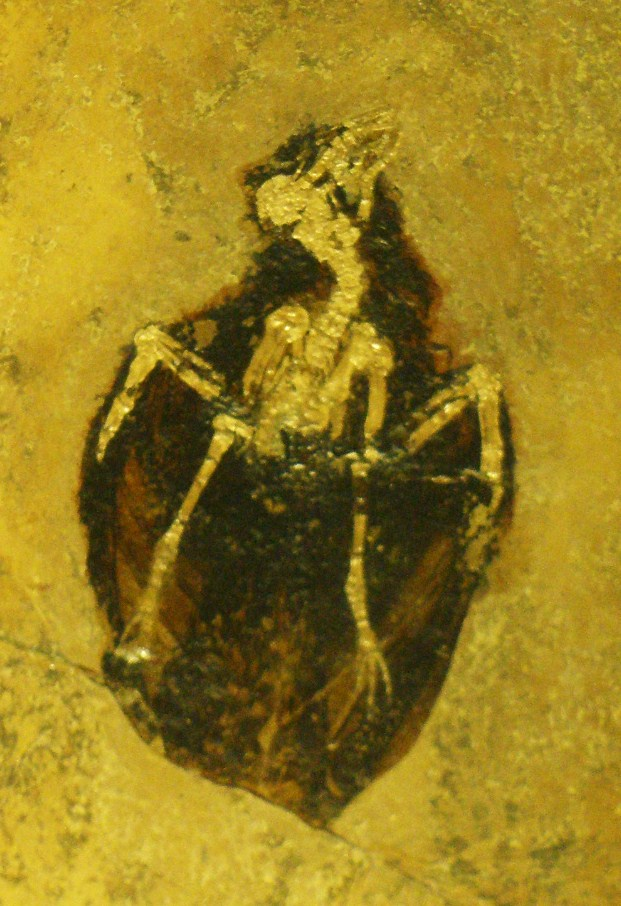
Fossil of Hassiavis laticauda, a probable daedalornithean, from the Messel fossil site

Strisores has a well-represented fossil record, with fossils of most major strisorean lineages known from the Paleogene. Chen et al. (2019) included 14 fossil lineages in their analysis. Nonetheless, it supports the emerging consensus phylogeny well. The genus Paraprefica, probably from the Early Eocene (though this is somewhat uncertain), seems to be a basal form that at times has been allied with the oilbird and the potoos, but cannot be assigned to either with certainty. In the consensus scenario, it would represent a record of the initial divergence of the three lineages.

This agrees with fossils suggesting that the basal divergence of the owlet-nightjar and apodiform branch also occurred during that time. In addition, Eocypselus, a Late Paleocene or Early Eocene genus of North America, cannot be assigned to any one strisore lineage with certainty but appears to be some ancestral form. Over some 20 million years, throughout the Eocene, the present-day diversity (as well as some entirely extinct lineages) slowly unfolds. By mid-Oligocene, some 30 mya, the crown lineages are present and adapting to their present-day ecological niches.

These Paleogene birds strongly suggest that the two main extant lineages of strisores separated about 60–55 mya (Selandian–Thanetian), and that some time around the Lutetian–Bartonian boundary, some 40 mya, the common ancestors of Nyctibiidae, Caprimulgidae and eared nightjars diverged from those of oilbird and frogmouths.

The relationships of the Early Eocene Parvicuculus and Procuculus from the southern North Sea basin are unresolved, but they bear some similarities to strisores.

By the distribution of fossils, the Paleogene radiation seems to have originated in Asia, which at that time became a highly fragmented landscape as the Himalayas lifted up and the Turgai Strait started to disappear.

Several fossil taxa are tentatively placed here as basal or incertae sedis

- Eocypselus (Late Paleocene or Early Eocene)
- Paraprefica (Early Eocene?)
- Archaeotrogonidae (Early Eocene of England ? – Late Eocene/Early Oligocene of France)
- Hassiavis (Middle Eocene of Messel, Germany) – Archaeotrogonidae?
- Protocypselomorphus (Middle Eocene of Messel, Germany)

== Systematics ==
Strisores contains the extant orders Aegotheliformes, Apodiformes (with families Apodidae, Hemiprocnidae, and Trochilidae), Caprimulgiformes, Nyctibiiformes, Podargiformes, Steatornithiformes. Apodidae and Hemiprocnidae are grouped together as Apodi, Apodi and Trochilidae are grouped together as Apodiformes, and Apodiformes and Aegotheliformes are grouped together as Daedalornithes.

The classification of the various birds that make up the order has long been controversial and difficult, particularly in the case of the nightjars and the paraphyly of the traditional Caprimulgiformes in relation to "Apodiformes", traditionally considered a separate order.

The IUCN adopts the following classification of Order Caprimulgiformes, which follows recent phylogenetic studies:

- Family Trochilidae (hummingbirds, 368 species)
- Family Apodidae (swifts, 96 species)
- Family Caprimulgidae (nightjars, 98 species)
- Family Podargidae (frogmouths, 14 species)
- Family Aegothelidae (owlet-nightjars, 10 species)
- Family Nyctibiidae (potoos, 7 species)
- Family Hemiprocnidae (treeswifts, 4 species)
- Family Steatornithidae (oilbird, 1 species)

The IUCN definition renders the order Caprimulgiformes identical to the clade Strisores. Authorities that favor the use of Strisores for this group (e.g., Yuri et al. 2013 and Chen et al. 2019) adopt a sensu stricto definition of the order, limiting to the family Caprimulgidae. They also elevate many (or even all) of the families traditionally placed in Caprimulgiformes to ordinal rank. This requires recognizing at least three additional orders: Nyctibiiformes, Steatornithiformes, and Podargiformes. Owlet-nightjars can be placed in their own order (Aegotheliformes) or viewed as a family within Apodiformes.

Traditionally, Caprimulgiformes were regarded, on morphological grounds, as being midway between the owls (Strigiformes) and the swifts. Like the owls, they are nocturnal hunters with a highly developed sense of sight, and like the swifts they are excellent flyers with small, weak legs. At one time or another, they have been allied with owls, swifts, kingfishers, hoopoes, mousebirds, hornbills, rollers, bee-eaters, woodpeckers, trogons and hummingbirds. A close relationship to owls can be rejected since there is strong molecular evidence that owls are members of a clade, called Telluraves, that excludes Caprimulgiformes.

Based on analysis of DNA sequence data – notably β-fibrinogen intron 7 – Fain and Houde considered the families of the Caprimulgiformes to be members of the proposed clade Metaves, which also includes the hoatzin, tropicbirds, sandgrouse, pigeons, kagu, sunbittern, mesites, flamingos, grebes and swifts and hummingbirds. Metaves was also found by the expanded study of Ericson et al. (2006), but support for the clade was extremely weak.

While only the latter study recovered monophyly of the Cypselomorphae (see below) within Metaves, the former was based on only a single locus and could not resolve their relationships according to standard criteria of statistical confidence. No morphological synapomorphies have been found that uniquely unite Metaves (or Caprimulgiformes for that matter), but numerous unlinked nuclear genes independently support their monophyly either in majority or whole. Ericson et al. (2006) concluded that if valid, the "Metaves" must originate quite some time before the Paleogene, and they reconciled this with the fossil record.

While the relationships of cypselomorphs are a subject of ongoing debate, the phylogeny of the individual lineages is better resolved. Much of the remaining uncertainty regards minor details.

Initial mtDNA cytochrome b sequence analysis agreed with earlier morphological and DNA–DNA hybridization studies insofar as that the oilbird and the frogmouths seemed rather distinct. The other lineages appeared to form a clade, but this is now known to have been caused by methodological limitations.

The Aegothelidae (owlet-nightjars) with about a dozen living species in one genus are apparently closer to the Apodiformes; these and the Caprimulgiformes are closely related, being grouped together as Cypselomorphae. The oilbird and the frogmouths seem quite distinct among the remaining Caprimulgiformes, but their exact placement cannot be resolved based on osteological data alone.

Even the study of Ericson et al. could not properly resolve the oilbird's and frogmouths' relationships beyond the fact that they are quite certainly well distinct. It robustly supported, however, the idea that the owlet-nightjars should be considered closer to Caprimulgiformes, unlike the methodologically weaker studies of Mariaux & Braun (1996) and Fain and Houde (2004).

Alternatively, Mayr's phylogenetic taxon Cypselomorphae might be placed at order rank and substitute the two present orders Caprimulgiformes and Apodiformes. Such a group would be fairly uninformative as regards its evolutionary history, as it has to include some very plesiomorphic and some extremely derived lineages (such as hummingbirds) to achieve monophyly. Reddy et al. (2017) included hummingbirds and swifts in Caprimulgiformes, preserving the monophyly of the order.

The following cladogram follows the results of Mayr's (2002) phylogenetic study, which used a parsimony analysis of 25 morphological characters:

- - Steatornithidae
  - Podargidae
  - - - Caprimulgidae
      - Nyctibiidae
    - - Aegothelidae
      - - Trochilidae
        - Hemiprocnidae
        - Apodidae

Subsequent molecular work has converged on two alternative topologies (topologies 1 and 2 below) that differ in the placement of the root. Although Braun et al. (2019) suggested that topology 1 was favored in large-scale analyses of non-coding data were analyzed and that topology 2 was favored in large-scale analyses of coding data (e.g., Prum et al. (2015)) subsequent analyses of datasets with many non-coding loci have also recovered topology 2. Thus, topology 2 should be viewed as the best-corroborated hypothesis at this time.

Topology 1: phylogeny according to Reddy et al. (2017), which analyzed 54 nuclear loci (mostly introns):

- Caprimulgiformes
  - - Steatornithidae
    - Nyctibiidae
  - - Caprimulgidae
    - - Podargidae
      - Daedalornithes
        - Aegothelidae
        - - - Hemiprocnidae
            - Apodidae
          - Trochilidae

Topology 2: phylogeny according to Prum et al. (2015) (259 "anchored hybrid enrichment" loci, which are mostly coding exons), Chen et al. (2019) (combined analysis of 2289 ultra-conserved elements [UCEs] and 117 morphological characters and including fossil taxa), and White and Braun (2019) (based on analyses of multiple UCE datasets, ranging in size from 2289 to 4243 loci):

- Caprimulgiformes
  - Caprimulgidae
  - Vanescaves
    - - Steatornithidae
      - Nyctibiidae
    - - Podargidae
      - Daedalornithes
        - Aegothelidae
        - - - Hemiprocnidae
            - Apodidae
          - Trochilidae

Cladogram based on Prum et al., with phylogenetic definitions following Chen et al.:

- Strisores
  - Caprimulgiformes sensu stricto
    Caprimulgidae (Nightjars)
  - Vanescaves
    - - Steatornithiformes
        Steatornithidae (oilbird)
      - Nyctibiiformes
        Nyctibiidae (potoos)
    - - Podargiformes
        Podargidae (frogmouths)
      - Daedalornithes
        - Aegotheliformes
          Aegothelidae (owlet-nightjars)
        - Apodiformes
          - - Hemiprocnidae (treeswifts)
            - Apodidae (swifts)
          - Trochilidae (hummingbirds)

Cladogram based on Reddy, S. et al. (2017):

- Caprimulgiformes sensu lato
  - - Steatornithidae (oilbird)
    - Nyctibiidae (potoos)
  - - Caprimulgidae (Nightjars)
    - - Podargidae (frogmouths)
      - Daedalornithes
        - Aegothelidae (owlet-nightjars)
        - - - Hemiprocnidae (treeswifts)
            - Apodidae (swifts)
          - Trochilidae (hummingbirds)

Chen et al. (2019) proposed the name Vanescaves for the clade comprising all Caprimulgiformes (=Strisores) except Caprimulgidae. White and Braun (2019) acknowledged that some uncertainty remains; specifically, monophyly of the clade comprising Steatornithidae and Nyctibiidae was limited and that three different resolutions of Steatornithidae, Nyctibiidae, and the clade comprising Podargidae and Daedalornithes remain plausible. However, they viewed topology 2 as the best-supported hypothesis.

Presently, the taxonomy favored by the International Ornithologists' Union (IOC) splits oilbirds, potoos, nightjars, and frogmouths into their own orders, along with the order Apodiformes as previously defined.

The cladogram below is based on the molecular phylogenetic study by Josefin Stiller and collaborators published in 2024. The relationships are identical to those obtained by Richard Prum and collaborators using different data in 2015. The orders shown are those recognised by the IOC.

- Strisores
  - Caprimulgiformes
    Caprimulgidae (nightjars)
  - - - Steatornithiformes
        Steatornithidae (oilbird)
      - Nyctibiiformes
        Nyctibiidae (potoos)
    - - Podargiformes
        Podargidae (frogmouths)
      - - Aegotheliformes
          Aegothelidae (owlet-nightjars)
        - Apodiformes
          - Trochilidae (hummingbirds)
          - - Apodidae (swifts)
            - Hemiprocnidae (treeswifts)
