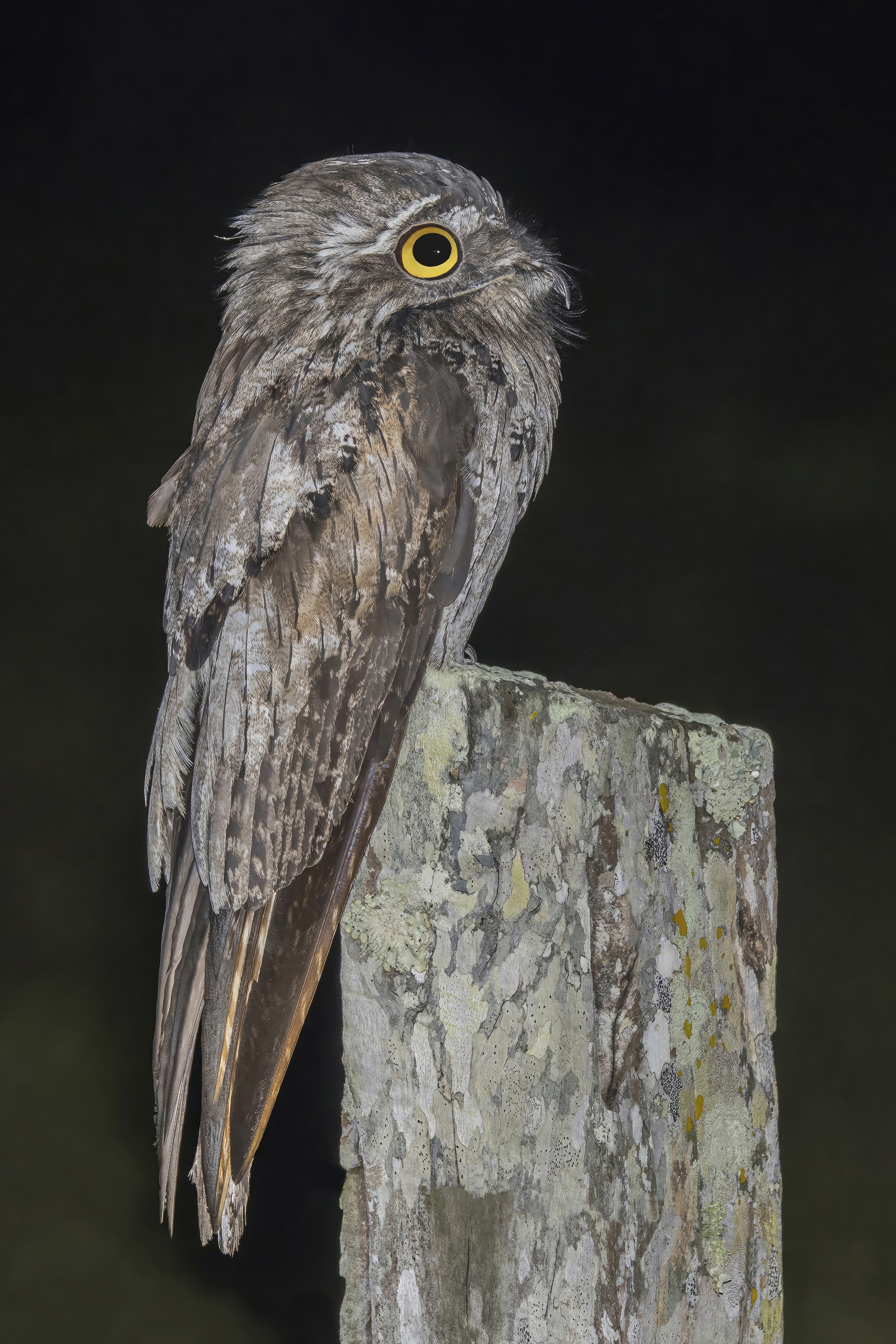
- Northern potoo (Nyctibius jamaicensis)

Scientific classification
- Kingdom: Animalia
- Phylum: Chordata
- Class: Aves
- Clade: Vanescaves
- Order: Nyctibiiformes; Yuri et al., 2013
- Family: Nyctibiidae; Chenu & Des Murs, 1853

Type species
- Nyctibius grandis (great potoo) Gmelin, JF, 1789

Genera
- Nyctibiinae; Nyctibius; Phyllaemulor; †Parapreficinae; †Paraprefica
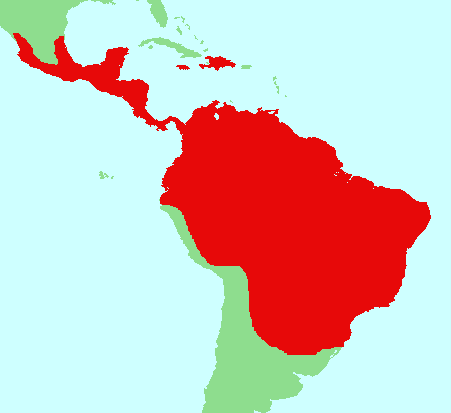
- Global range (In red)

= Potoo =

Potoo Temporal range: Middle Eocene to present 48–0 Ma

Family of nocturnal birds of tropical Central and South America

Potoos (family Nyctibiidae) are a group of birds related to the oilbird, with which they share the Sedentaves subclade. They are sometimes called poor-me-ones, after their haunting calls. The family Nyctibiidae was formerly included with the nightjars in the order Caprimulgiformes but is now placed in a separate order, Nyctibiiformes. There are seven species in two genera in tropical Central and South America. Fossil evidence indicates that they also inhabited Europe during the Paleogene.

Potoos are nocturnal insectivores that lack the bristles around the mouth found in the true nightjars. They hunt from a perch like a shrike or flycatcher. During the day they perch upright on tree stumps, camouflaged to look like part of the stump. The single spotted egg is laid directly on the top of a stump.

In Argentina, they are known as kakuy or cacuy from Quechua meaning 'to remain'. In Bolivia they are called guajojo, for the sound of their call. In Brazil, Uruguay and Paraguay, they are called urutaú from Guarani guyra 'bird' and tau 'ghost'.

== Evolution and taxonomy ==
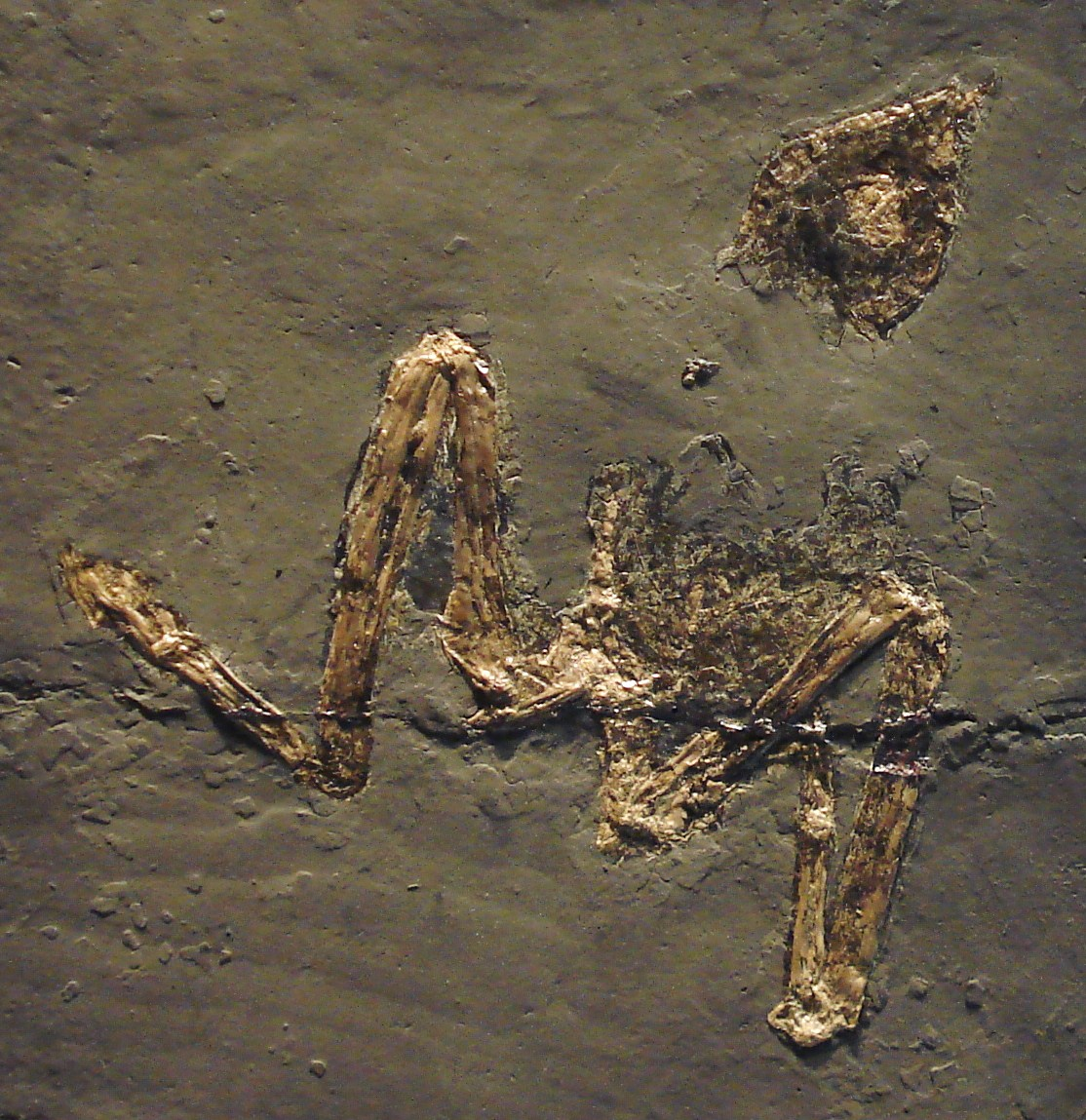
Paraprefica major fossil

The potoos today are exclusively found in the Americas, but they apparently had a much more widespread distribution in the past. Fossil remains of potoos dating from the Eocene have been found in Germany. A complete skeleton of the genus Paraprefica has been found in Messel, Germany. It had skull and leg features similar to those of modern potoos, suggesting that it may be an early close relative of the modern potoos. Because the only fossils other than these ancient ones that have been found are recent ones of extinct species, it is unknown if the family once had a global distribution which has contracted, or if the distribution of the family was originally restricted to Europe and has shifted to the Americas.

A 1996 study of the mitochondrial DNA of the potoos supported the monophyly of the family although it did not support the previous assumption that it was closely related to the oilbirds. The study also found a great deal of genetic divergence between the species, suggesting that these species are themselves very old. The level of divergence is the highest of any genus of birds, being more typical of the divergence between genera or even families. The northern potoo was for a long time considered to be the same species as the common potoo, but the two species have now been separated on the basis of their calls. In spite of this there is no morphological way to separate the two species.

The family Nyctibiidae was introduced (as Nyctibie) in 1853 by the French naturalists Jean-Charles Chenu and Œillet des Murs. Prior to this, its species were classified in the Caprimulgidae.

=== Species ===
- Nyctibiidae
  - †Parapreficinae
    †Paraprefica
  - Nyctibiinae
    - Phyllaemulor
      Rufous potoo (P. bracteatus)
    - Nyctibius
      - Great potoo (N. grandis)
      - - Long-tailed potoo (N. aethereus)
        - - - Andean potoo (N. maculosus)
            - White-winged potoo (N. leucopterus)
          - - Common potoo (N. griseus)
            - Northern potoo (N. jamaicensis)

Phylogeny based on a study by Michael Braun and Christopher Huddleston published in 2009 and Costa et al., 2021

The family Nyctibiidae contains seven species in two genera:

- Family Nyctibiidae Chenu & Des Murs, 1851
  - Subfamily Nyctibiinae Chenu & Des Murs, 1851
    - Genus Phyllaemulor Costa, Whitney, Braun, White, Silveira & Cleere 2018
      - Rufous potoo, Phyllaemulor bracteatus (Gould 1846)
    - Genus Nyctibius Vieillot 1816
      - Great potoo, Nyctibius grandis (Gmelin 1789)
      - Long-tailed potoo, Nyctibius aethereus (zu Wied-Neuwied 1820)
      - Northern potoo, Nyctibius jamaicensis (Gmelin 1789)
      - Common potoo or lesser potoo, Nyctibius griseus (Gmelin 1789)
      - Andean potoo, Nyctibius maculosus Ridgway 1912
      - White-winged potoo, Nyctibius leucopterus (zu Wied-Neuwied 1821)

Prior to 2018, Nyctibius was considered the only extant genus within the Nyctibiidae; however, a study that year found a deep divergence between the rufous potoo and all other species in the genus, leading it to be described in the new genus Phyllaemulor and expanding the number of genera within the family. This was followed by the International Ornithological Congress in 2022.

In addition, the fossil genus Paraprefica, the only member of the extinct subfamily Parapreficinae, is known from the Eocene of Germany (the Messel pit), marking the earliest fossil evidence of potoos. The fossil genus Euronyctibius, from the Oligocene of France, was formerly considered a potoo, but analysis supports it instead being a close relative of the oilbird (family Steatornithidae).

== Summary of extant species ==
Common name	Binomial name	Population	Status	Trend	Notes	Image
Northern potoo	Nyctibius jamaicensis	50,000 - 499,999	LC	▼	Population values are estimated for mature individuals only.	
Great potoo	Nyctibius grandis	500,000 - 4,999,999	LC	▼	Population values are estimated for mature individuals only.	
Common potoo	Nyctibius griseus	500,000 - 4,999,999	LC	▼	Population values are estimated for mature individuals only.	
Long-tailed potoo	Nyctibius aethereus	unknown	LC	▼		
White-winged potoo	Nyctibius leucopterus	unknown	LC	▼		
Andean potoo	Nyctibius maculosus	unknown	LC	▼		
Rufous potoo	Phyllaemulor bracteatus	unknown	LC	▼		

== Description ==
The potoos are a highly conservative family in appearance, with all the species closely resembling one another; species accounts in ornithological literature remark on their unusual appearance. Potoos range from 21–58 cm (8.3–22.8 in) in length. They resemble upright sitting nightjars, a closely related family (Caprimulgidae). They also resemble the frogmouths of Australasia, which are stockier and have much heavier bills. They have proportionally large heads for their body size and long wings and tails. The large head is dominated by a massive broad bill and enormous eyes. In the treatment of the family in the Handbook of the Birds of the World, Cohn-Haft describes the potoos as "little more than a flying mouth and eyes". The bill, while large and broad, is also short, barely projecting past the face. It is delicate, but has a unique "tooth" on the cutting edge of the upper mandible that may assist in foraging. Unlike the closely related nightjars, the potoos lack rictal bristles around the mouth. The legs and feet are weak and used only for perching.

The eyes are large, even larger than those of nightjars. As in many species of nocturnal birds, they reflect the light of flashlights. Their eyes, which could be conspicuous to potential predators during the day, have unusual slits in the lids, which allow potoos to sense movement even when their eyes are closed. Their plumage is cryptic, helping them blend into the branches on which they spend their days.

== Distribution and habitat ==
The potoos have a Neotropical distribution. They range from Mexico to Argentina, with the greatest diversity occurring in the Amazon Basin, which holds five species. They are found in every Central and South American country. They also occur on three Caribbean islands: Jamaica, Hispaniola and Tobago. The potoos are generally highly sedentary, although there are occasional reports of vagrants, particularly species that have traveled on ships. All species occur in humid forests, although a few species also occur in drier forests.

== Behavior ==
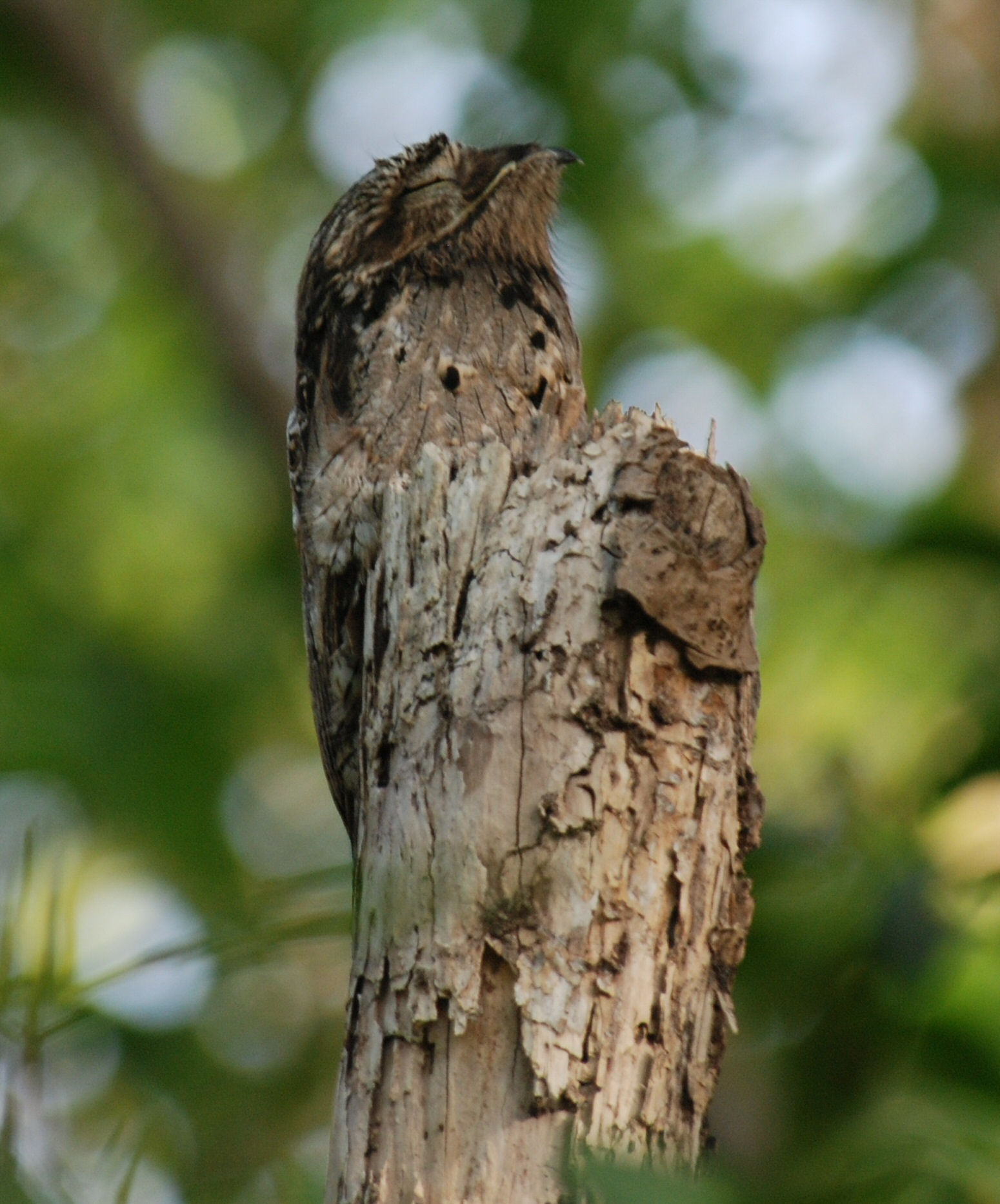
Common potoo camouflaged on a stump

The potoos are highly nocturnal and generally do not fly during the day. They spend the day perched on branches with the eyes half closed. With their cryptic plumage they resemble stumps, and should they detect potential danger they adopt a "freeze" position which even more closely resembles a broken branch. The transition between perching and the freeze position is gradual and hardly perceptible to the observer.

The English zoologist Hugh Cott, describing Nyctibius griseus as "this wonderful bird", writes that it "habitually selects the top of an upright stump as a receptacle for its egg, which usually occupies a small hollow just, and only just, large enough to contain it ... the stump selected had thrown up a new leader just below the point of fracture ... and the birds sat facing this in such a way that when viewed from behind they came into line and blended with the grey stem."

=== Food and feeding ===
Potoos feed at dusk and at night on flying insects. Their typical foraging technique is to perch on a branch and occasionally fly out in the manner of a flycatcher in order to snatch a passing insect. They occasionally fly to vegetation to glean an insect off it before returning to their perch, but they do not attempt to obtain prey from the ground. Beetles form a large part of their diet, but they also take moths, grasshoppers and termites. Having caught an insect, potoos swallow it whole without beating or crushing it.

Potoos appear to locate most of their prey by sight, using their large, forward‑facing eyes to scan for the movement or silhouette of flying insects against the dim sky or gaps in the canopy. Their wide, gaping mouth and bristle‑fringed bill help funnel insects in mid‑air, so a short sally from the perch can efficiently capture even relatively large beetles or moths. Once they return to the perch, they make only minimal head or body movements before resuming their characteristic still, upright posture, which allows them to continue hunting without drawing attention from predators.

Because they do not pursue prey over long distances, potoos depend on choosing vantage points where insect traffic is naturally concentrated, such as along forest edges, above clearings, or near gaps in the canopy. Their sit‑and‑wait strategy means they can feed steadily through much of the night while expending relatively little energy on sustained flight. Occasional records of small vertebrates, such as a bird found in the stomach of a northern potoo, suggest that they opportunistically take any suitably sized prey that comes within range, but these items are likely rare compared with their usual insect fare.

=== Breeding ===
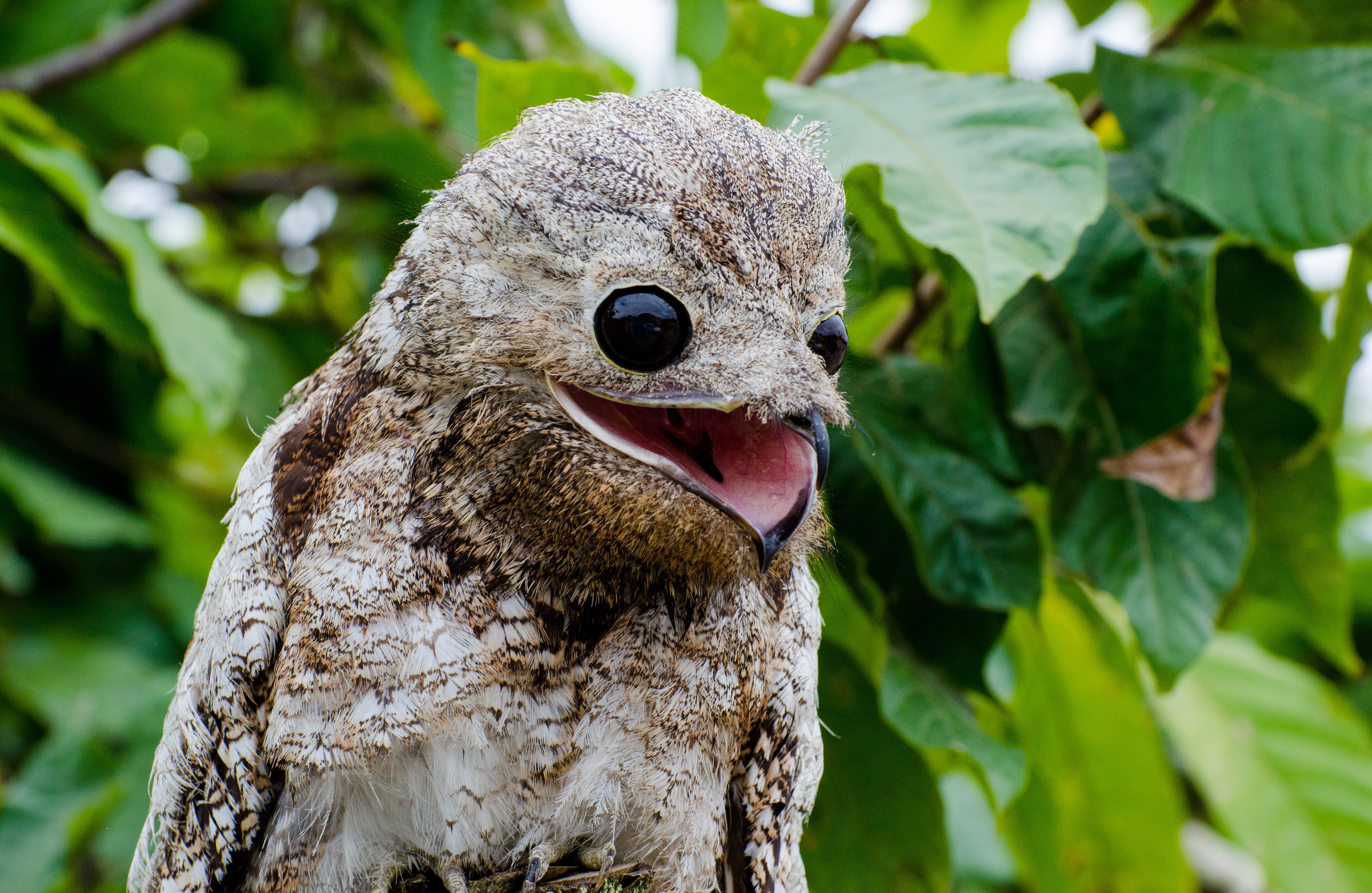
Great potoo, Nyctibius grandis

Potoos are monogamous breeders and both parents share responsibilities for incubating the egg and raising the chick. The family does not construct a nest of any kind, instead laying the single egg on a depression in a branch or at the top of a rotten stump. The egg is white with purple-brown spots. One parent, often the male, incubates the egg during the day, then the duties are shared during the night. Changeovers to relieve incubating parents and feed chicks are infrequent to minimise attention to the nest, as potoos are entirely reliant on camouflage to protect themselves and their nesting site from predators. The chick hatches about one month after laying and the nestling phase is two months, a considerable length of time for a landbird. The plumage of nestling potoos is white and once they are too large to hide under their parents they adopt the same freeze position as their parents, resembling clumps of fungus.

=== Defense ===
The behaviors described above suggest that the common potoo adopts different defensive strategies to suit its circumstances. For a lone potoo, or a brooding adult with a potential predator close to the nest, the bird attempts to avoid detection by remaining motionless and relying on camouflage. If ineffective, the potoo breaks cover and attempts to intimidate the predator by opening its beak and eyes wide open while vocalizing or simply flies out of reach. Nocturnal predators rely less on vision for locating prey therefore a different strategy may be required at night.

At night, when most predators depend less on vision and more on sound or echolocation, the potoo shifts to quieter, more evasive tactics. Instead of relying on stillness, it maintains a low, inconspicuous perch and uses its night vision to detect approaching threats early, allowing it to slip away in near‑silent flight before it is located. If a predator comes close to the nest in darkness, adults may perform distraction displays, giving soft calls and fluttering out of reach to draw attention away from the chick rather than standing their ground. In dense forest, their muffled wingbeats and habit of flying short, erratic distances between perches make it difficult for a nocturnal hunter to track them in flight. These behaviors, combined with their naturally cryptic shape against the broken outlines of branches, form a defense at night that is based more on going unnoticed and being hard to follow than on being visually “invisible.”

=== Vocalization ===
Potoos have a distinctive haunting song which consists of up to eight plaintive, whistled notes which progressively drop in pitch. These melancholic phrases are a characteristic sound of rainforest edge throughout much of the range of these species. When defending its nest, it sometimes makes dry, harsh tearing sounds and bill snaps in defense.

Potoos also give short growls, hisses, and low moans at close range, especially when a predator or intruder approaches their perch or nest. In addition to these defensive calls, adults and fledglings may emit soft grunts and squeaks to maintain contact at night while remaining concealed. Their vocal repertoire, though limited, is well-suited to dense forest, with far‑carrying songs used for territory and mate communication and quieter, harsher notes reserved for threat displays and close encounters.
