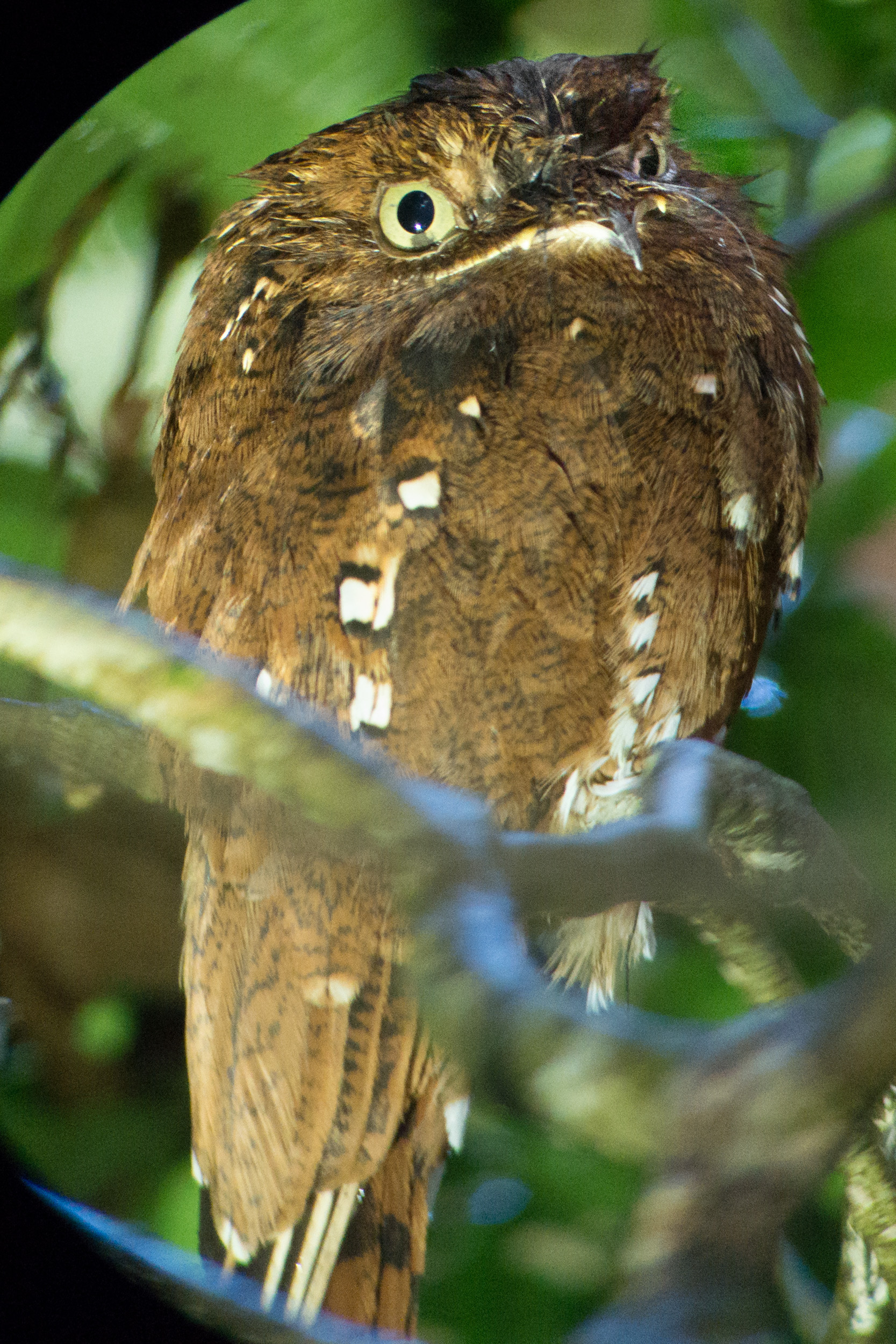

Conservation status
- Least Concern (IUCN 3.1)

Scientific classification
- Kingdom: Animalia
- Phylum: Chordata
- Class: Aves
- Order: Nyctibiiformes
- Family: Nyctibiidae
- Subfamily: Nyctibiinae
- Genus: Phyllaemulor; Costa, Whitney, Braun, M, White, ND, Silveira & Cleere, 2017
- Species: P. bracteatus

Binomial name
- Phyllaemulor bracteatus (Gould, 1846)

Synonyms
- Nyctibius bracteatus Gould, 1846

= Rufous potoo =

Species of bird

The rufous potoo (Phyllaemulor bracteatus) is a species of bird in the family Nyctibiidae. It is the only member of the genus Phyllaemulor. It is found in Brazil, Colombia, Ecuador, French Guiana, Suriname Guyana, Peru, and Venezuela.

== Taxonomy and systematics ==
A 2009 publication suggested that the rufous potoo differed enough in cranial structure and genetic divergence from other potoos (in the genus Nyctibius) that it deserved to be in its own genus, Phyllaemulor. This genus was officially described by Costa et al. in 2017. As of 2022, the BirdLife International Handbook of the Birds of the World, the International Ornithological Committee (IOC), and the South American Classification Committee of the American Ornithological Society (AOS-SACC) have followed in reclassified it into Phyllaemulor. The Clements taxonomy retains it in genus Nyctibius.

The rufous potoo is monotypic.

== Description ==
The rufous potoo is 21 to 25 cm (8.3 to 9.8 in) long and weighs 46 to 58 g (1.6 to 2.0 oz). The rufous potoo is the smallest member of its family, and the most unusually colored. It is overall a deep orange-red with large white spots; the color is paler on the throat. The spots on the upper belly have a thin black border and the tail has darker bars. It has long bristles in the loral region. It resembles a dead leaf, an impression heightened by its vertical posture on a roost, where it gently sways.

== Distribution and habitat ==
The rufous potoo is found in Amazonia from Venezuela south to Peru and east into Brazil, French Guiana, and Guyana. The AOS-SACC also records it as "Hypothetical" in Bolivia. It is known only from scattered locations though it probably occurs more widely than them. It primarily inhabits forests on nutrient-poor soils such as those with high sand content and those in blackwater regions. It is mostly found in the under- and mid-stories of both primary and mature secondary terra firme forest. It also occurs in swampy palm forests of the Campinarana. In elevation it ranges only as high as 550 m (1,800 ft).

== Behavior ==
=== Feeding ===
The rufous potoo forages by sallying from a perch to capture flying insects, and usually returns to the same perch. It feeds on insects of at least five orders.

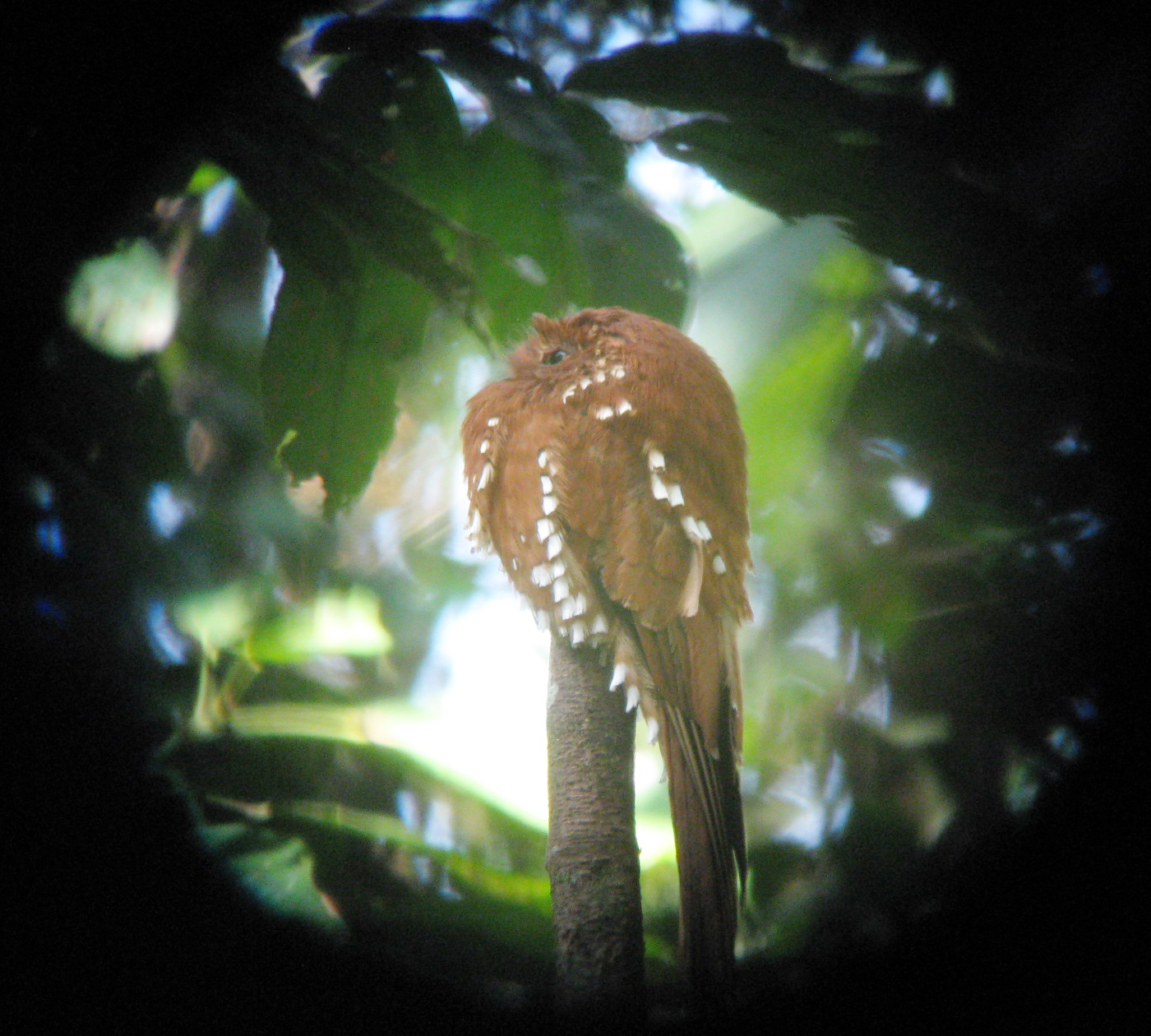
Rufous potoo on its nest

=== Breeding ===
The rufous potoo's nesting season apparently spans from September to possibly February. Very few nests are known. The "nest" is unusual: The bird lays its single egg on top of a broken stub.

=== Vocalization ===
The rufous potoo's song is "a soft, rapidly descending series of roughly 10–15 notes: “bu-bu-bu-bu-bu-bu..." or "whooo, tooo, tooo, tooo, tooo, tooo, tooo, tooo, tooo, tooo, tooo, toot" that resembles the songs of some small owls. It mostly, and perhaps exclusively, sings during a few days around the full moon. It also makes "wup" or "urt" calls.

== Status ==
The IUCN has assessed the rufous potoo as being of Least Concern, though its population is not known and is believed to be decreasing. It is "[p]robably not seriously threatened as long as extensive areas of Amazonian forest remain intact".
