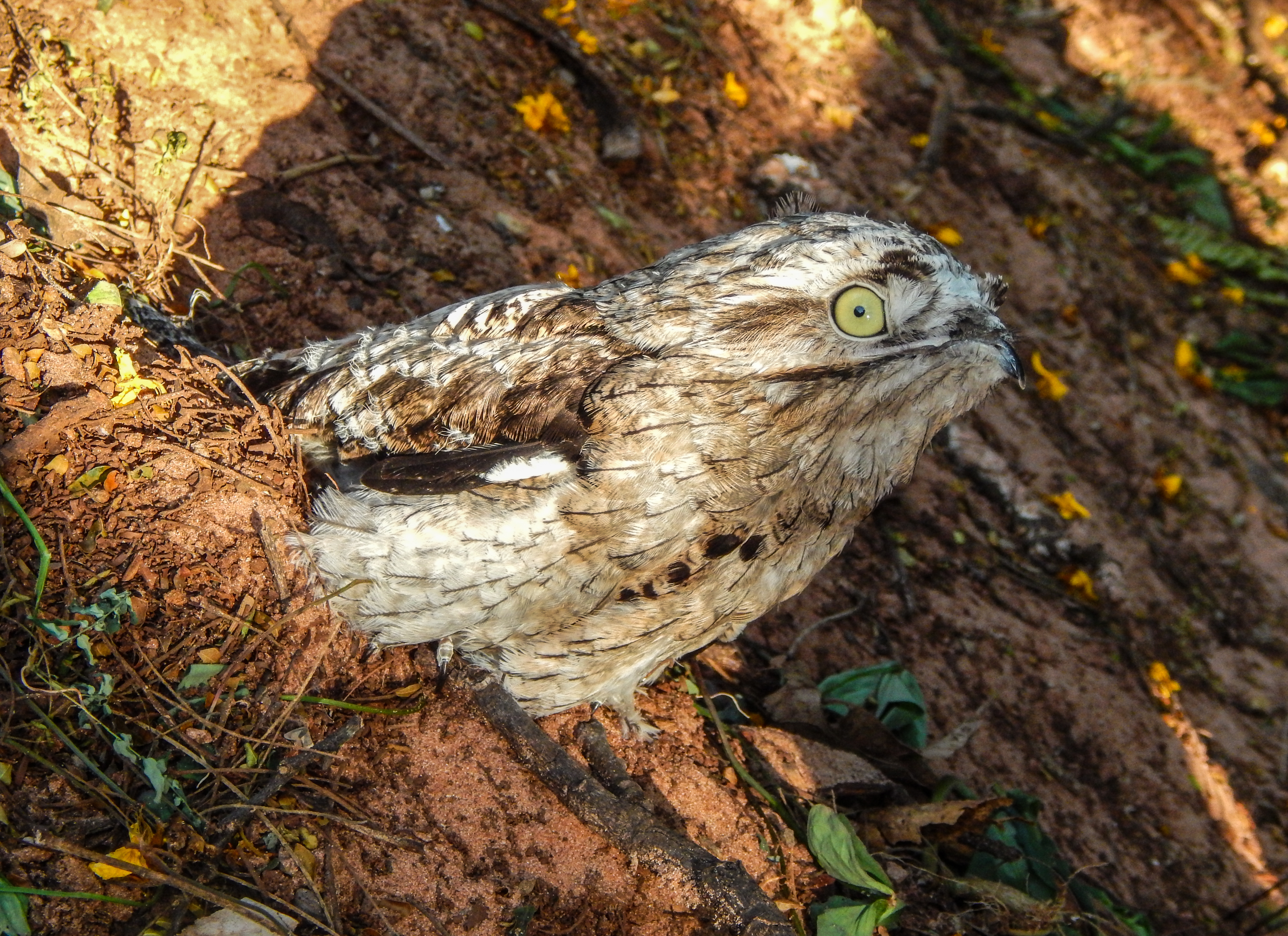
- In Paranavaí, Paraná, Brazil Common potoo song, recorded in Colombia

Conservation status
- Least Concern (IUCN 3.1)

Scientific classification
- Kingdom: Animalia
- Phylum: Chordata
- Class: Aves
- Order: Nyctibiiformes
- Family: Nyctibiidae
- Genus: Nyctibius
- Species: N. griseus

Binomial name
- Nyctibius griseus (Gmelin, JF, 1789)

= Common potoo =

Species of bird

The common potoo (Nyctibius griseus), also known as the kakuy or urutaú, is one of seven species of birds within the genus Nyctibius. It is notable for its large, yellow eyes and a wide mouth. Potoos are nocturnal and are related to nightjars and frogmouths. They lack the characteristic bristles around the mouths of true nightjars.

== Taxonomy ==
The common potoo was formally described in 1789 by the German naturalist Johann Friedrich Gmelin in his revised and expanded edition of Carl Linnaeus's Systema Naturae. He placed it with all the nightjar-like species in the genus Caprimulgus and coined the binomial name Caprimulgus griseus. Gmelin based his description on "L'engoulevent gris" from Cayenne that had been described from a preserved specimen in 1779 by the French polymath Georges-Louis Leclerc, Comte de Buffon. The common potoo is now one of the seven potoos placed in the genus Nyctibius that was introduced in 1816 by the French ornithologist Louis Pierre Vieillot. The genus name is from the Ancient Greek nuktibios meaning "night-feeding", from nux night and bios "life". The specific epithet griseus is Medieval Latin meaning "grey".

The common potoo was formerly considered to be conspecific with the northern potoo (Nyctibius jamaicensis). The species were split by the American Ornithologists' Union in 1995 based mainly on the differences in vocalization.

Two subspecies are recognised:

- N. g. panamensis Ridgway, 1912 – east Nicaragua to west Panama, west Colombia, and west Ecuador
- N. g. griseus (Gmelin, JF, 1789) – north, central South America east of the Andes

== Description ==
Common potoos are 34–38 cm (13–15 in) long with mottled red-brown, white, black, and grey cryptic plumage. This disruptive coloration allows the potoo to camouflage into branches. The sexes appear similar, and cannot be distinguished upon observation. The eyes can appear as giant black dots with a small yellow ring, or as giant yellow irises with small pupils due to voluntary pupil constriction. The potoo has two or three slits in the eyelid so that it can see when the eyelids are closed; these notches are always open. The upper and lower eyelids can be moved independently and rotated over the eye into the desired position so that the bird may adjust its field of vision. The common potoo has an unusually wide mouth with a tooth in its upper mandible for foraging purposes.

It has a haunting melancholic song, a BO-OU, BO-ou, bo-ou, bo-ou, bo-ou, bo-ou, bo-ou, bo-ou dropping in both pitch and volume. When seized, this bird produces a squeaky sound not unlike that of a crow. This call greatly differs from that of much deeper and more dramatic northern potoo.

== Distribution and habitat ==
The nominate subspecies of the common potoo is found in Trinidad and Tobago and every mainland South American country except Chile, though it has been recorded in that country as a vagrant. There it ranges from the Andes to the Atlantic Ocean. N. g. panamensis is found from eastern Nicaragua south through Costa Rica and Panama and west of the Andes from northwestern Venezuela through Colombia and Ecuador into northwestern Peru.

The common potoo is a resident breeder in open woodlands and savannah. It avoids cooler montane regions; it is rarely observed over 1,900 m (6,200 ft) above mean sea level even in the hottest parts of its range. It tends to avoid arid regions but was recorded in the dry Caribbean plain of Colombia in April 1999. It has many populations in the gallery forest-type environment around the Uruguayan-Brazilian border. A bit further south, where the amount of wood-versus grassland is somewhat lower, it is decidedly rare, and due west, in the Entre Ríos Province of Argentina with its abundant riparian forest, it is likewise not common. The birds at the southern end of their range may migrate short distances northwards in winter.

== Behavior and ecology ==
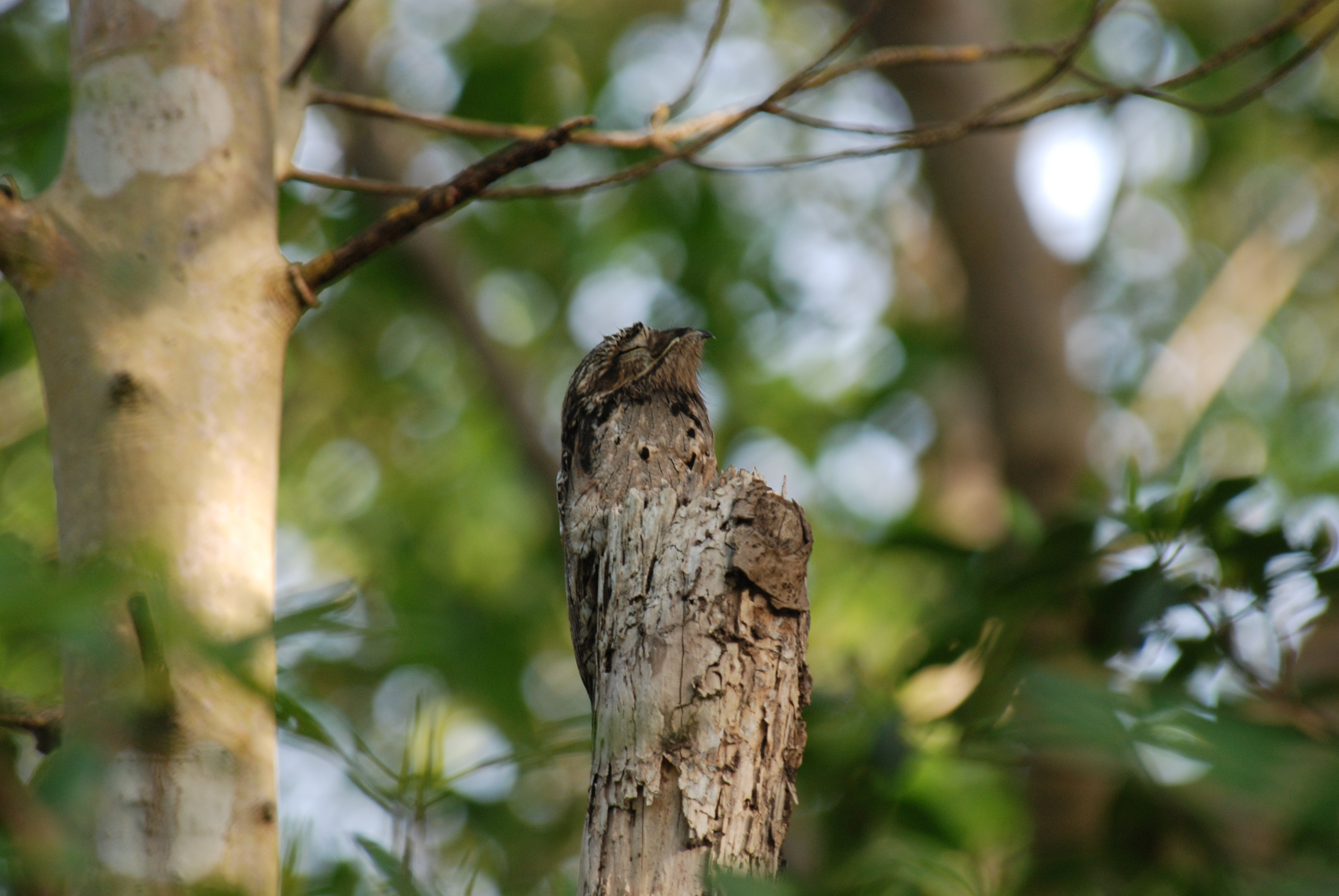
A common potoo masquerading as a branch

=== Cryptic behavior ===
The common potoo seeks to mimic the perch on which it rests, using a technique called masquerading. Adult and juvenile potoos choose perches that are similar in diameter to their own bodies so that they can better blend in with the stump. Most potoos choose stumps and other natural materials on which to rest, but some adults have been spotted perching on human-made items. These birds adjust their perching angle to best mimic the stump where they are.

The potoo sits with its eyes open and its bill horizontal while awake, but if disturbed, assumes an alert "freezing" posture. This entails sticking its beak vertically up in the air, closing its eyelids (through which it can still see via slits), and remaining still. If disturbed by larger animals, such as common marmosets (Callithrix jacchus), it may break its camouflage and try to chase the threat away. If disturbed by a human being, its behaviors can be quite variable - quickly flying away, intimidation via beak-opening, or remaining still even when being touched.

=== Feeding ===
This nocturnal insectivore hunts from a perch like a shrike or flycatcher. It uses its wide mouth to capture insects such as flies and moths, but also ants, other hymenopterans, termites, grasshoppers, locusts, and crickets. It has a unique tooth in its upper mandible to assist in foraging but swallows its prey whole.

=== Breeding ===
The common potoo chooses a stump 3–15 m (10–50 ft) high to occupy. It normally chooses a branch stump as a nest and adds no sort of decorative or insulative material. It ejects feces from its perch to keep the nest clean. If breeding, the potoo chooses a stump with a small divot where an egg can be laid.

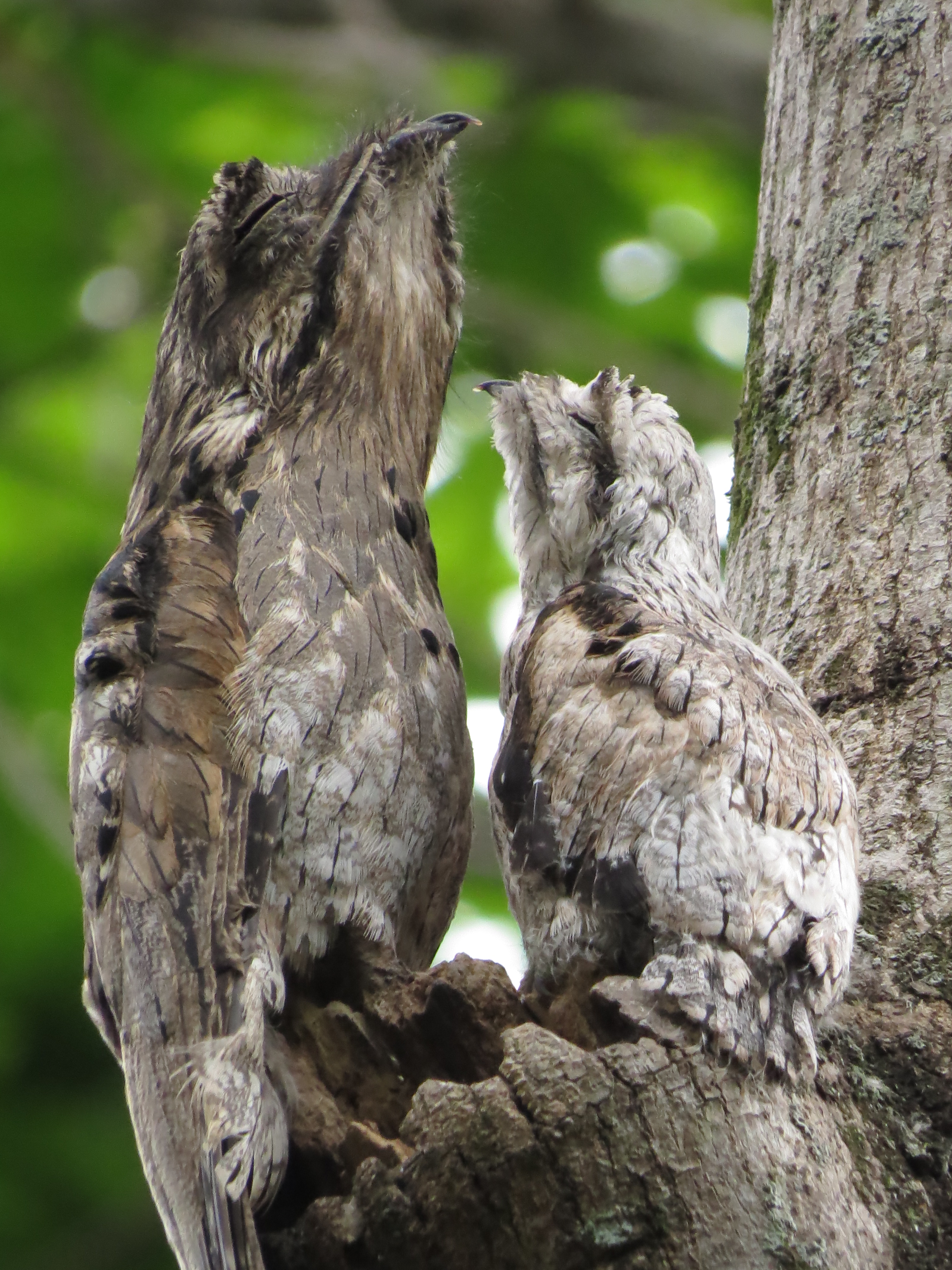
Adult and juvenile common potoos in alert posture

Common potoos are monogamous. After mating, the female lays a single white egg with lilac spots directly into the depression in a tree limb. Parents normally care for one egg at a time. The male and female alternate brooding the egg while the other forages for insects. They divide brooding time evenly.

Potoos lay their eggs in December to begin their roughly 51-day nesting period, one of the longest nesting periods for birds their size. Young potoos hatch after about 33 days, using their egg tooth to break free and emerge as downy individuals with pale brown and white stripes. The hatchling is fed by regurgitation. Parents gradually decrease their presence in the nest with the juvenile as it matures. While the parents are away from the nest, the fledgling begins to feed on nearby flies and preen itself. Around 14 days old, the juvenile begins wing exercises and takes gradual steps toward leaving the nest. It ventures out on several flights, then returns to the nest with its parents, before departing for good about 25 days after hatching. Juveniles display disruptive coloration like adults, so they can also camouflage into a branch. Apart from flying away, chicks respond to disturbances in a similar manner to adults.

== Status ==
The IUCN has assessed the common potoo as being of Least Concern. It has an extremely large range and a population of at least 500,000 mature individuals. However, the population is declining, probably due to habitat destruction.
