= Hertsa urban hromada =

Urban hromada in Chernivtsi Oblast, Ukraine

Coordinates: 48°08′26″N 26°12′11″E

Hertsa urban hromada Герцаївська міська громада
- Hromada
- Interactive map of Hertsa urban hromada
- Country: Ukraine
- Oblast: Chernivtsi
- Raion: Chernivtsi

Area
  - Total: 56.21 km^{2} (21.70 sq mi)

Population (2018)
  - Total: 6,349
  - Density: 113.0/km^{2} (292.5/sq mi)
- Settlements: 12
- Cities: 1
- Villages: 11

Hertsa urban territorial hromada (Ukrainian: Герцаївська міська територіальна громада, romanized: Hertsaivska miska terytorialna hromada) is a hromada of Ukraine, located in the western Chernivtsi Oblast. Its administrative centre is the city of Hertsa. According to the 2001 Ukrainian census, out of 17,519 inhabitants of the Hertsa urban territorial hromada, established in 2020, 16,627 spoke Romanian as their mother tongue (94.91%), out of which 16,485 inhabitants (94.06%) called the language Romanian and 142 (0.81%) called it Moldovan. Moreover, 572 inhabitants were Ukrainian-speaking (3.27%), 298 were Russian-speaking (0.17%), while 25 spoke other languages (0.14%).

== Settlements ==
In addition to one city (Hertsa), there are 11 villages within the hromada:

- Bairaky
- Diakivtsi
- Khriatska
- Kulykivka
- Lunka
- Mohylivka
- Molnytsia
- Petrashivka
- Pidvalne
- Ternavka
- Velykosillia

== See also ==
- Hertsa region
- Dorohoi County
- Hertsa raion
- Romanians in Ukraine
