= Lunka =

Village in Chernivtsi Oblast, Ukraine

Lunka Лунка Lunca
- Village
- Interactive map of Lunka
- Location of Lunka Lunka (Ukraine)
- Coordinates: 48°11′0″N 26°17′39″E
- Country: Ukraine
- Oblast: Chernivtsi Oblast
- Raion: Chernivtsi Raion

Lunka (Ukrainian: Лунка; Romanian: Lunca) is a village in Chernivtsi Raion, Chernivtsi Oblast, Ukraine. It belongs to Hertsa urban hromada, one of the hromadas of Ukraine.

Until 18 July 2020, Lunka belonged to Hertsa Raion. The raion was abolished in July 2020 as part of the administrative reform of Ukraine, which reduced the number of raions of Chernivtsi Oblast to three. The area of Hertsa Raion was merged into Chernivtsi Raion. In 2001, 95.92% of the 588 inhabitants spoke Romanian (546 people), including 540 who called their language Romanian (91.84%) and 24 who called it Moldovan (4.08%) as their native language, with a minority of Ukrainian speakers (3.23% or 19 people) and of Russian-speakers (0.68% or 4 people). In 1989, out of 497 people in the village, 428 were Romanians (86.12%), 51 were Moldovans (10.26%), 13 were Ukrainians (1.2%) and 4 were Russians (0.8%). A majority of the population with a Moldovan and Moldovan-speaking identity switched their declared census identities from Moldovan and Moldovan-speaking to Romanian and Romanian-speaking between the 1989 and 2001 censuses, and the process has continued ever since, which was typical for the former Hertsa Raion.

== Lunca massacre ==
A massacre took place there on February 7, 1941, when hundreds of civilians (mostly ethnic Romanians) were killed during an attempt to cross the border from the Soviet Union to Romania.

== See also ==
- Hertsa region
- Dorohoi County
- Hertsa raion
- Romanians in Ukraine
