= Petrashivka =

Village in Chernivtsi Oblast, Ukraine

Coordinates: 48.0981°N 26.1089°E

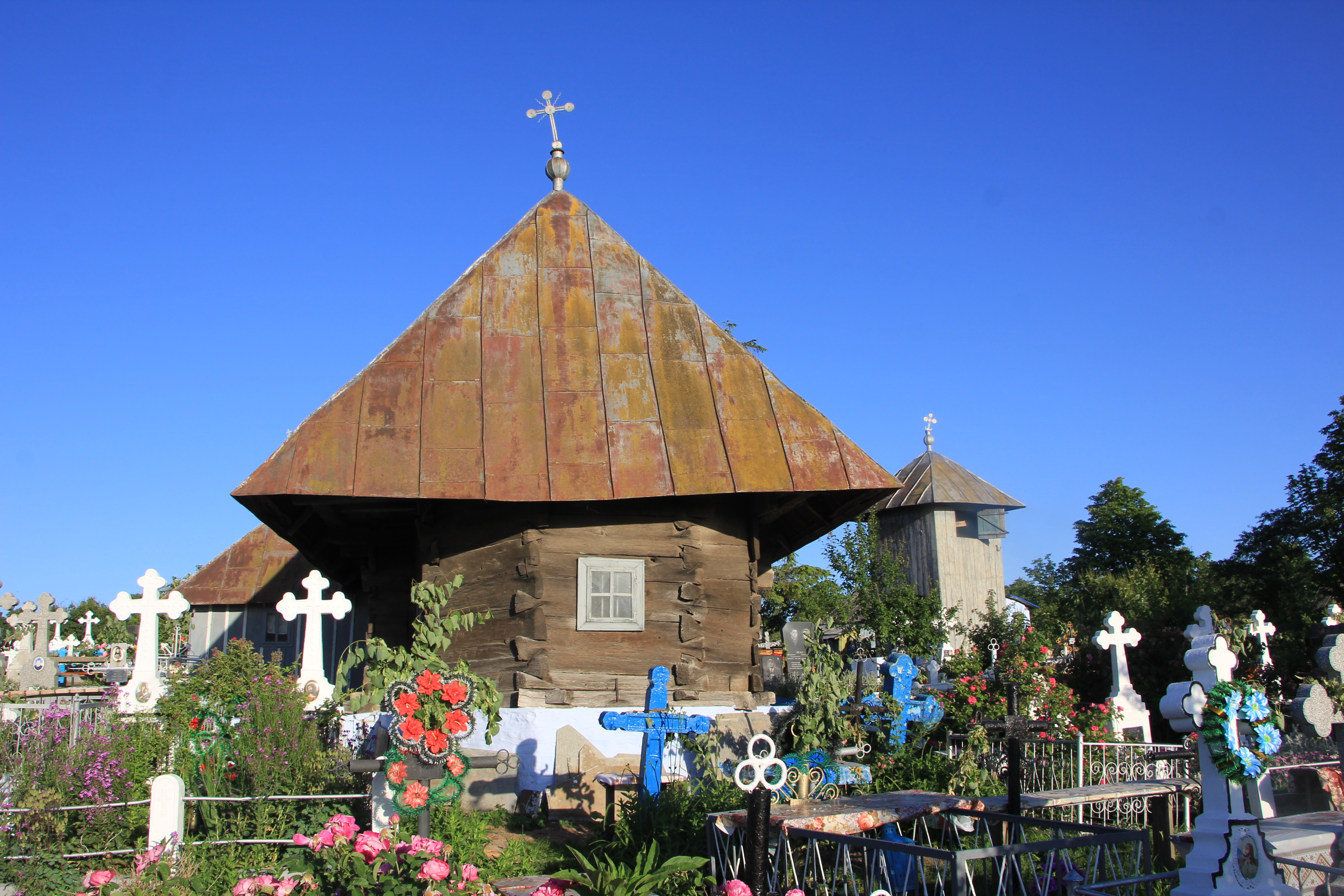
Saint Michael's wooden church

Petrashivka (Ukrainian: Петрашівка; Romanian: Mihoreni or Petrașivca) is a village in Chernivtsi Raion, Chernivtsi Oblast, Ukraine. It belongs to Hertsa urban hromada, one of the hromadas of Ukraine.

Until 18 July 2020, Petrashivka belonged to Hertsa Raion. The raion was abolished in July 2020 as part of the administrative reform of Ukraine, which reduced the number of raions of Chernivtsi Oblast to three. The area of Hertsa Raion was merged into Chernivtsi Raion. In 2001, 98.9% of the inhabitants spoke Romanian as their native language.

== Notable people ==
- Longhin Jar (born 1965), priest

== See also ==
- Hertsa region
- Dorohoi County
- Hertsa raion
- Romanians in Ukraine
