= Khriatska =

Commune in Chernivtsi Oblast, Ukraine

Coordinates: 48.1567°N 26.1869°E

Khriatska (Ukrainian: Хряцька; Romanian: Hreațca) is a commune (selsoviet) in Chernivtsi Raion, Chernivtsi Oblast, Ukraine. It is composed of a single village, Khriatska, and belongs to Hertsa urban hromada, one of the hromadas of Ukraine.

Until 18 July 2020, Khriatska belonged to Hertsa Raion. The raion was abolished in July 2020 as part of the administrative reform of Ukraine, which reduced the number of raions of Chernivtsi Oblast to three. The area of Hertsa Raion was merged into Chernivtsi Raion. In 2001, 98.54% of the inhabitants spoke Romanian as their native language, while 1.05% spoke Ukrainian.

== Notable people ==
- Violeta Moskalu (born 1980), professor and management expert

== See also ==
- Hertsa region
- Dorohoi County
- Hertsa raion
- Romanians in Ukraine
