= Hodynivka =

Village in Chernivtsi Oblast, Ukraine

Coordinates: 48.1894°N 26.1325°E

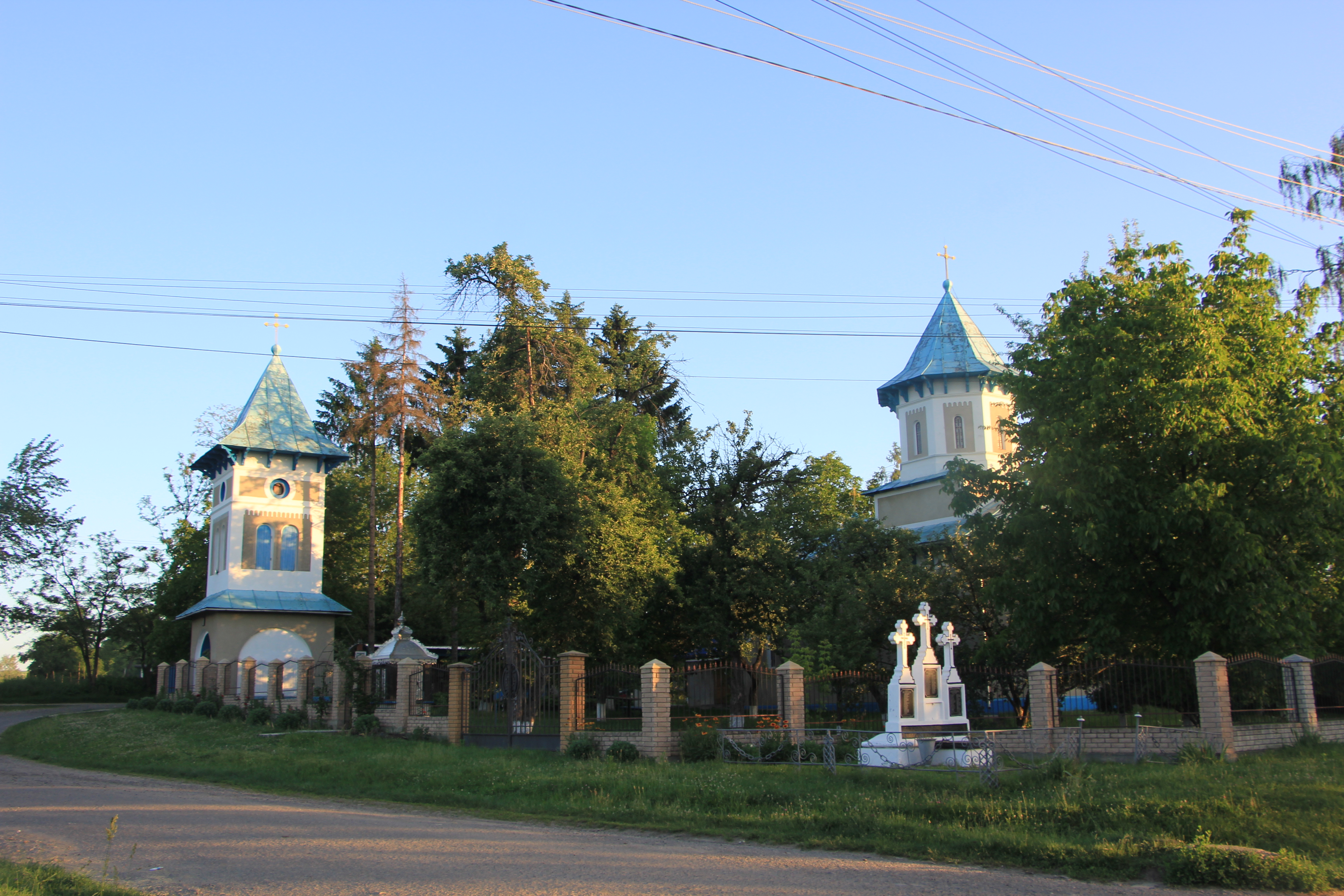

Hodynіvka (Ukrainian: Годинівка; Romanian: Godinești) is a village in Chernivtsi Raion, Chernivtsi Oblast, Ukraine. It belongs to Ostrytsia rural hromada, one of the hromadas of Ukraine,

Until 18 July 2020, Hodynivka belonged to Hertsa Raion. The raion was abolished in July 2020 as part of the administrative reform of Ukraine, which reduced the number of raions of Chernivtsi Oblast to three. The area of Hertsa Raion was merged into Chernivtsi Raion. In 2001, 96.67% of the inhabitants spoke Romanian as their native language, while 2.7% spoke Ukrainian.

== See also ==
- Hertsa region
- Dorohoi County
- Hertsa raion
- Romanians in Ukraine
