= Hertsa Raion =

Former subdivision of Chernivtsi Oblast, Ukraine

Hertsa Raion Герцаївський район (in Ukrainian) Raionul Herța (in Romanian)
- Raion
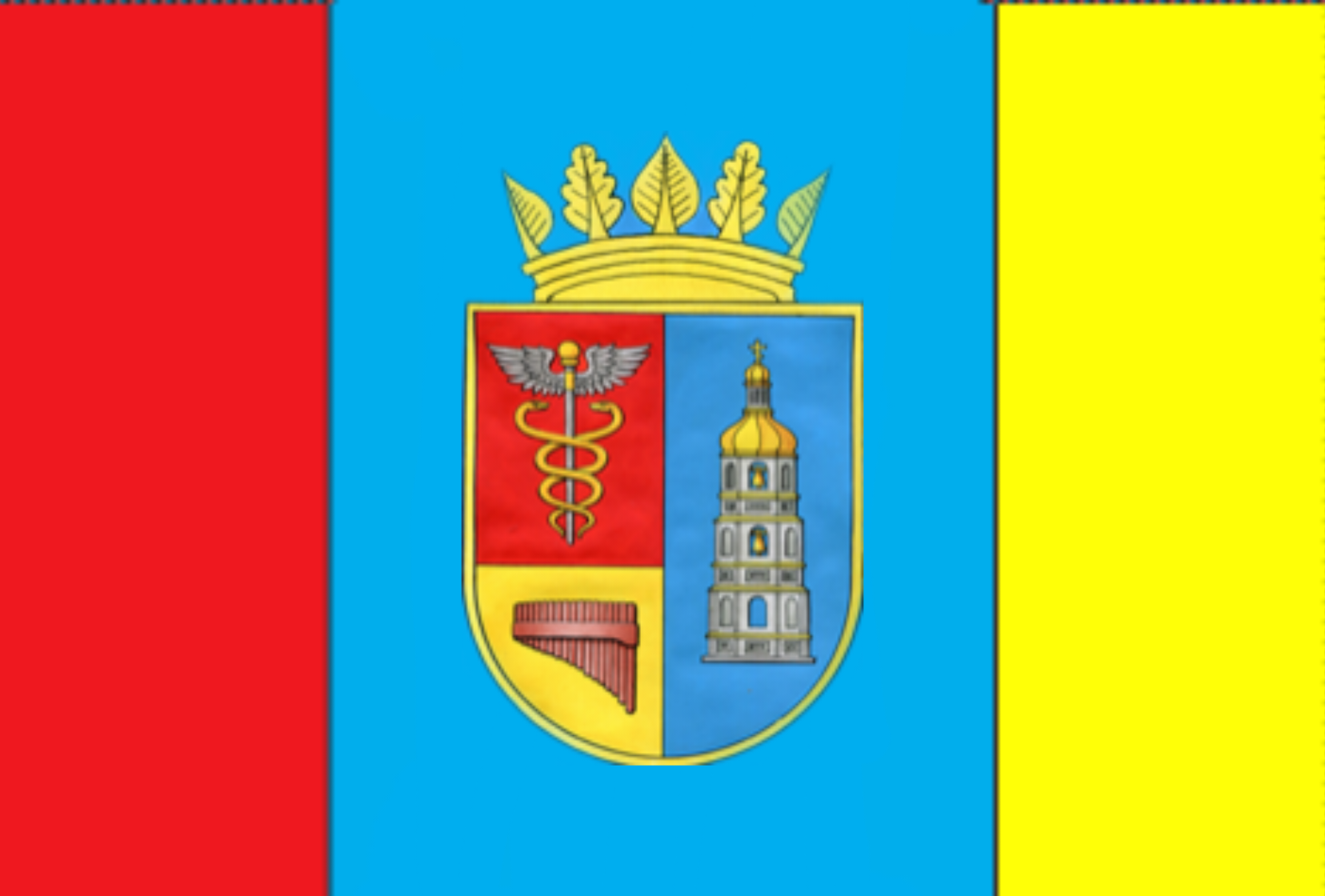
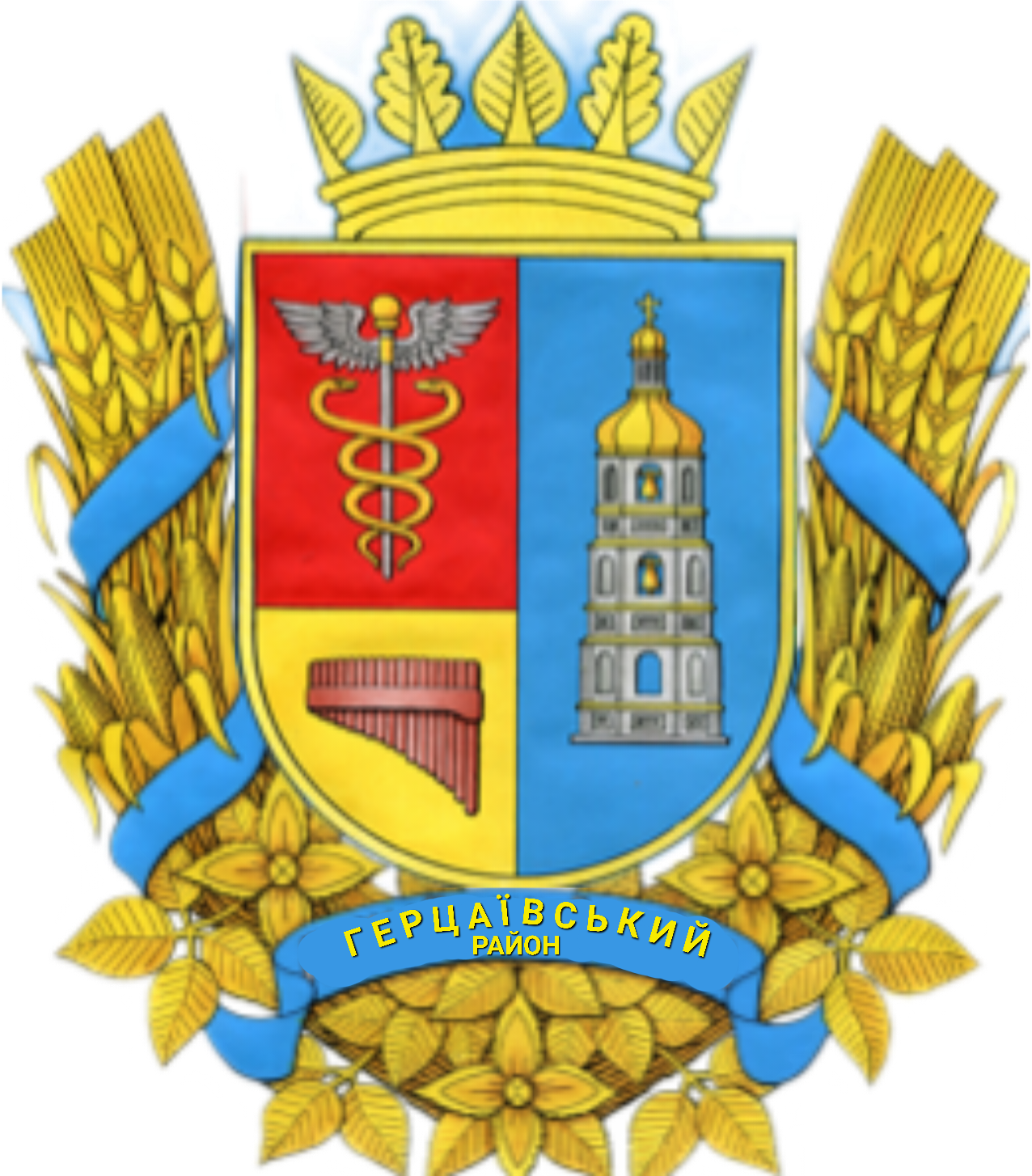
- Flag Coat of arms

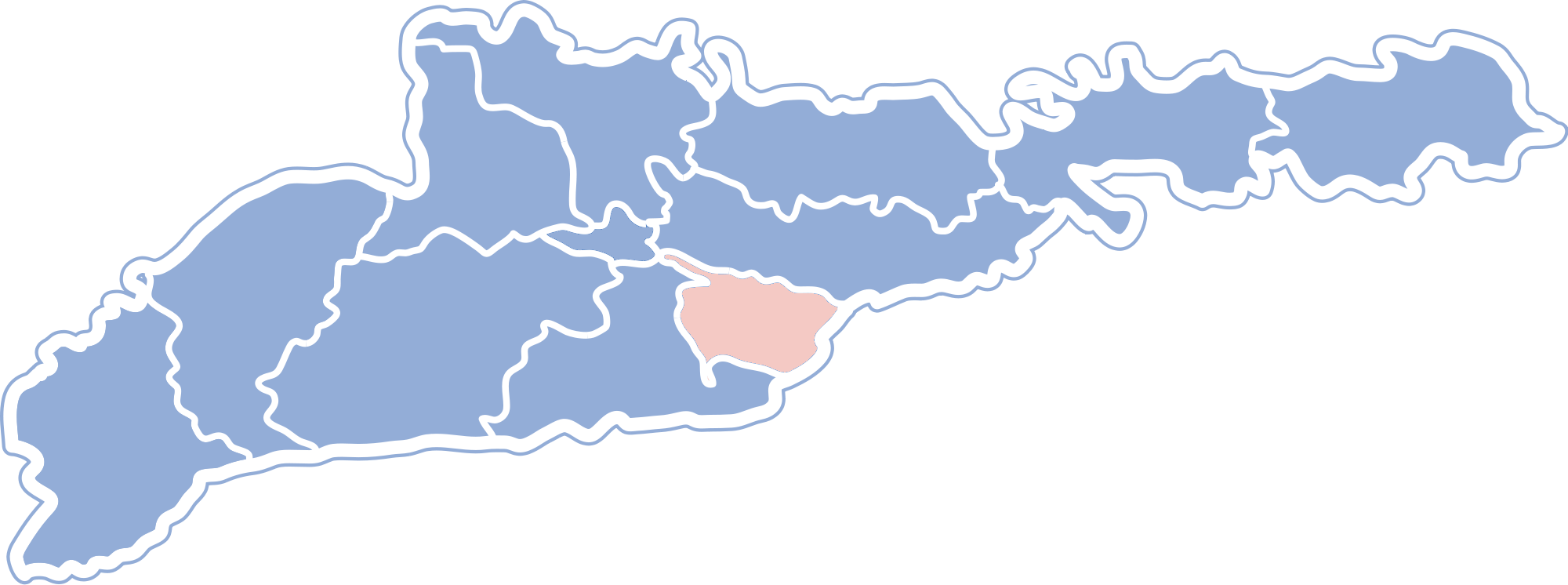
- Coordinates: 48°8′40″N 26°12′10″E
- Country: Ukraine
- Region: Chernivtsi Oblast
- Established: pre-1962, 1991
- Disestablished: 18 July 2020
- Admin. center: Hertsa
- Subdivisions: List: — city councils; — settlement councils; — rural councils; Number of localities: — cities; — urban-type settlements; 23 — villages; — rural settlements

Government
  - Governor: Vasyl' Mykhailovych Skrypa

Area
  - Total: 308.7 km^{2} (119.2 sq mi)

Population (2020)
  - Total: 33,175
  - Density: 107.5/km^{2} (278.3/sq mi)
- Time zone: UTC+02:00 (EET)
  - Summer (DST): UTC+03:00 (EEST)
- Postal index: N/A
- Area code: 380
- Website: Official website

Hertsa Raion or Hertza Raion (Ukrainian: Герцаївський район, translit.: Hertsaiivs'kyi raion; Romanian: Raionul Herța pronounced [raˈjonul ˈhert͡sa]) was an administrative raion (district) in the southern part of Chernivtsi Oblast in western Ukraine, on the Romanian border. The region had an area of 308.7 square kilometres (119.2 mi^{2}) and the administrative center in the city of Hertsa. It was one of the three raions of Ukraine with the majority of the ethnic Romanian population. The raion was abolished on 18 July 2020 as part of the administrative reform of Ukraine, which reduced the number of raions in Chernivtsi Oblast to three. The area of Hertsa Raion was merged into Chernivtsi Raion. The last estimate of the raion population was 33,175 (2020 est.)

At the time of disestablishment, the raion consisted of two hromadas, Hertsa urban hromada with the administration in Hertsa and Ostrytsia rural hromada with the administration in the selo of Ostrytsia.

== History ==
The Hertsa region was part of the Principality of Moldavia since its founding in the 14th century. After the unification of Moldavia and Wallachia in 1859, it became part of Romania (which gained its formal independence in 1877), as one of the five districts (plăși) of Dorohoi County.

The region was occupied by the Soviet Union in 1940 following the signing of the Molotov–Ribbentrop Pact with Nazi Germany, and was added to the Ukrainian Soviet Socialist Republic. It was recaptured by Romania in 1941 in the course of the Axis attack on the Soviet Union in World War II, but it was recaptured again by the Soviet Army in 1944. The annexation was confirmed by the Paris Peace Treaties in 1947 between the USSR and Romania.

The fact that neither the secret protocol (appendix) of the Molotov–Ribbentrop Pact, which specified the expansionist claims of both sides, nor the June 1940 Soviet Ultimatum demanding from the Kingdom of Romania the adjacent territory of Northern Bukovina and Bessarabia included Hertsa makes the capture by the Soviets controversial in Romania. Furthermore, unlike Bessarabia and Northern Bukovina, the region had not been a part of Imperial Russia or Austria-Hungary before World War I, but had been a part of Romania and one of its predecessor states, Moldavia, before that.

The number of deportees to the Soviet north and east from the Hertsa raion in its boundaries from earliy 2020 of the Chernivtsi oblast on June 13, 1941, was 1,373; 219 (15.95%) of them would later die in Siberia and Kazakhstan. Among the 1,373 deportees from Hertsa Raion, 120 were of unknown nationality; among the 1,253 people whose nationality was known, 1090 (86.99%) were ethnic Romanians, 125 were ethnic Jews (9.98%), 31 were ethnic Ukrainians (2.474%), 4 were ethnic Russians (0.32%), 2 were ethnic Germans (0.02%) and 1 was ethnically Polish (0.08%).

Almost all the Jews who lived in the town of Hertsa (1,204) and in the rest of the Hertsa area (14), which were under Soviet rule in 1940-1941 and in 1944-1991, on September 1, 1941, were deported to Transnistria by the Romanian authorities, where most of them died; only 450 were alive in December 1943 (according to Andrei Corbea-Hoisie), when the repatriation of the Jews to Dorohoi County, including of these people, by the Romanian authorities started, while about 800 Jews died. However, the number of about 1,200 Jews were not individuals counted in the town; on August 11, 1941, there were 1,200 Jews from Herta in the concentration camp in Secureni in Northern Bessarabia. The Romanian army and authorities killed about 100 Jews on July 5, 1941, before the deportation to Transnistria. The Yad Vashem database lists the names of 102 Jews from Hertsa who were killed in Hertsa. Moreover, 483 Jews from Hertsa and the neighboring villages died in Ukraine, including Transnistria, because of the deportations according to the Yad Vashem website. For the entire Dorohoi County ("Judet"), a large majority of which remained in Romania, 6,425 Jews survived the deportations to Transnistria, while 5,131 died between September 6, 1940, and August 23, 1944, during the Antonescu dictatorship, overwhelmingly due to the deportations of 1941 and 1942.

The Yad Vashem database lists the identities of 843 Jews from Herta who died during World War II. It lists the identities of five Jews from Herta who were killed by the Soviet authorities in Siberia, and of 461 who died in Ukraine, including Transnistria, because of the deportations. For more information on the Holocaust in Transnistria, including on the fate of the Jewish deportees from Romania, see History of the Jews in Transnistria. For more information on the Holocaust in Transnistria, including on the fate of the Jewish deportees from Romania, see History of the Jews in Transnistria. According to the newest data, out of 1,650 Jews of the town of Hertsa who were deported to Transnistria (which excludes those who were executed before that), about 800 died in Transnistria.

In 1962, the raion was merged into Hlyboka Raion, and in 1991, it was reinstated again.

In 2003/2004, the raion had 10 Romanian middle schools, 7 incomplete middle schools and 11 elementary schools in Romanian, with 315 classes and 5,446 students, and a Ukrainian middle school and a Ukrainian elementary school, with 15 classes and 259 students.

The city of Hertsa has a Romanian-language newspaper, Gazeta de Herța.

== Demographics ==
In 1930, the region had a population of 30,082, of which 27,919 (92.8%) Romanians, 1,931 (6.4%) were Jews, and 232 (0.8%) people of other ethnicities.

In 2001, the population of Hertsa Raion was 32,316, of which 29,554 or 91.45% identified themselves as Romanians, 1,616 or 5.0% as Ukrainians, and 756 or 2.34% as Moldovans (out of which 511 self-identified their language as Moldovan and 237 as Romanian), 0.9% as Russians, and 0.3% as being of other ethnicities (see: Ukrainian Census, 2001). Hertsa raion, within its boundaries at that time, had 32,316 inhabitants in 2001, including 4.83% Ukrainian-speakers, 93.82% Romanian-speakers, and 1.21% Russian-speakers. In the last Soviet census of 1989, out of 29,611 inhabitants, 1,569 declared themselves Ukrainians (5.30%), 23,539 Romanians (79.49%), 3,978 Moldovans (13.43%), and 431 Russians (1.46%). The decline in the number (from 3,978 to 756) and proportion of Moldovans (from 13.43% to 2.34%) was explained by a switch from a census Moldovan to a census Romanian ethnic identity, and has continued after the 2001 census. By contrast, the number of self-identified ethnic Romanians has increased (from 23,539 to 29,554), and so has their proportion of the population of the former raion (from 79.49% to 91.45%), and the process has continued after the 2001 census. Some authors have argued that most of the inhabitants of the former Hertsa Raion who had self-identified themselves as Moldovans in 1989 self-identified themselves as Romanians in 2001. Since the Hertsa raion split from the Hlyboka raion after the 1989 Soviet census, we do not have the breakdown of the inhabitants of Hertsa raion by native language in 1989. In 2001, this was Ukraine's only raion in which an absolute majority of the population was recorded by the census as having a Romanian identity, and the raion in Ukraine with the largest proportion of Romanian-speakers.

According to the 2001 census, in the Hertsa urban hromada (urban community) created in 2020, with a population of 17,519, 572 of the inhabitants (3.27%) spoke Ukrainian as their native language, while 16,627 (94.91%) spoke Romanian, including 16,485 who called their language Romanian (94.1%) and 142 who called it Moldovan (0.81%) and 298 (1.7%) spoke Russian. In 2001, in the Ostrytsia rural hromada (rural community) created in 2020, with a population of 13,868, 960 of the inhabitants (6.92%) spoke Ukrainian as their native language, while 12,796 (92.27%) spoke Romanian (out of which 12,428 or 89.62% called the language Romanian and 371 or 2.68% called the language Moldovan), and 89 (0.64%) spoke Russian.

The raion included only three localities in which there were more self-identified Moldovans than Romanians in 1989, all of them historically a part of Bukovina; in two, the population identified its language overwhelmingly as Romanian in 2001 (see below). In the village of Ostrytsia in the Hertsa Raion, in 2001, 93.73% of the inhabitants spoke Romanian as their native language (93.22% self-declared Romanian and 0.52% self-declared Moldovan), while 4.96% spoke Ukrainian. In the Soviet census of 1989, the number of inhabitants of the locality who declared themselves Romanians plus Moldovans was 2,965 (324, or 10.05% Romanians plus 2,641 or 81.92% Moldovans) out of 3,224, representing 91.97% of the locality's population, and there were 205 ethnic Ukrainians (6.36%). In 2001, 893, or 94.4% of the 946 inhabitants of the village of Tsuren of the Hertsa Raion spoke Romanian as their native language (630 self-declared it Romanian or 66.6%, and 263 declared in Moldovan, or 27.8%), with a minority of 50 Ukrainian speakers (5.29%). In the 1989 census, the number of residents who declared themselves Romanian plus Moldovan was 865, representing 96.11% of the locality's population out of 900, including 108 self-identified Romanians (12%) and 757 self-identified Moldovans (84.11%), and there were 31 ethnic Ukrainians (3.44%).

Another locality where a significant amount of identity change from Moldovan and Moldovan-speaking to Romanian and Romanian-speaking was Mamornytsia (see Mamornytsia (in Ukrainian) and Mamornița (in Romanian)).

The number of self-declared ethnic Romanians plus Moldovans in the raion (30,310, or 93.79%) was slightly lower than the number of Romanian-speakers (30,337, or 93.88%); 99.65% of the Romanians plus Moldovans used Romanian as their native language, a figure comparable to that of the Romanian ethnic population in Transcarpathia. The number of ethnic Ukrainians in the raion increased from 1,569 to 1,616, but their percentage of the population decreased from 5.3% to 5%. The number of ethnic Ukrainians due to natural increase and because of the identity change of a number of previously self-identified ethnic Romanians or Russians to ethnic Ukrainians from among those who had attended Ukrainian schools. While 51 Romanians and 6 Moldovans declared that their native language was Ukrainian, 89 Ukrainians were speaking Romanian as their mother tongue in 2001.

== Localities ==
Hertsa Raion was composed of 1 city and 13 incorporated localities, containing a total of 24 villages (Romanian names listed in brackets):

- Герца Hertsa (Herța)
- Байраки Bairaky (Mogoșești)
- Буківка Bukivka (Poieni, Poieni-Bucovina, Puieni)
- Годинівка Hodynivka (Godinești, Godânești)
- Горбова Horbova (Horbova)
- Хряцька Khriatska (Hreațca)
- Куликівка Kulykіvka (Colincăuți, Culiceni)
- Лунка Lunka (Lunca)
- Молниця Molnytsia (Molnița)
- Остриця Ostrytsia (Ostrița, Stârcești)
- Петрашівка Petrashivka (Mihoreni, Petrașivca)
- Тернавка Ternavka (Târnauca)
- Цурень Tsuren (Țureni)
- Велика Буда Velyka Buda (Buda Mare)

The 10 unincorporated villages are:

- Банчени Bancheny (Bănceni)
- Дяківці Diakіvtsі (Probotești)
- Круп'янське Krupianske (Pasat)
- Луковиця Lukovytsia (Lucovița, Lucovița Moldovenească)
- Мала Буда Mala Buda (Buda Mică)
- Маморниця Mamornytsia (Mamornița, Mamornița Ucraineană)
- Могилівка Mohylivka (Movila)
- Підвальне Pіdval'ne (Becești)
- Радгоспівка Radhospivka (Vama)
- Великосілля Velykosillia (Pilipăuți, Satul Mare)

== See also ==
- Subdivisions of Ukraine
- Romanians in Ukraine
- Hertsa region
- Hertsa
- Dorohoi County
- History of the Jews in Transnistria
- History of the Jews in Bukovina
