= Vasile Bogrea =

Romanian philologist and linguist (1881–1926)

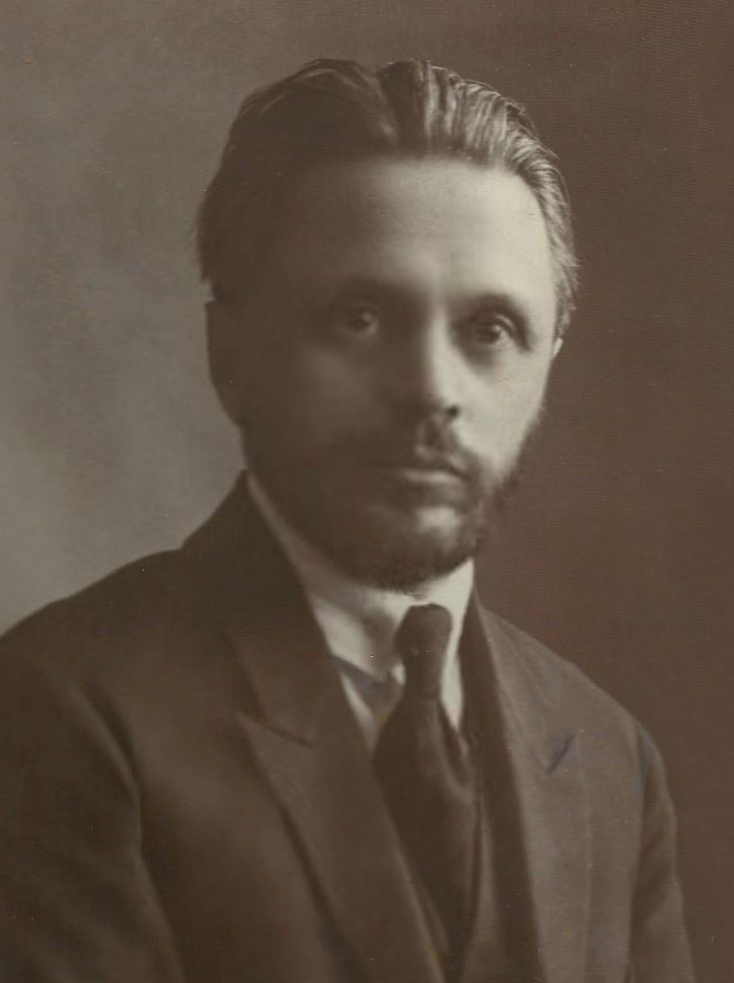

Vasile Bogrea (October 8, 1881–September 8, 1926) was a Romanian philologist and linguist.

== Biography ==
Born in Târnauca, Dorohoi County (now Ternavka, Ukraine), he attended school at Pomârla from 1888 to 1902. He then studied at the letters and philosophy faculty of Iași University, graduating in 1906. He earned a doctorate in classical philology from Berlin University in 1913. He taught Latin and Greek at the Boarding High School in Iași. In 1920 he became a professor at the letters and philosophy faculty of Cluj University. That June, Bogrea was elected a corresponding member of the Romanian Academy. His contributions appeared in Analele Dobrogei, Anuarul Arhivei de Folclor, Anuarul Institutului de Filologie Clasică, Anuarul Institutului de Istorie Națională, Cultura Poporului, Dacoromania, Grai și suflet, Propilee literare, Ramuri and Transilvania. Together with Sextil Pușcariu, he helped establish the Museum of the Romanian Language (1919) and the Cluj Ethnographic Society (1923). He made important contributions to fields such as language history, lexicology, etymology, toponymy and anthroponymy. He authored some 300 works and studies. His journalistic activity was prolific, encompassing news, articles, essays, reviews, political pamphlets and feuilletons. He wrote epigrams, verses, maxims and reflections. He died in Vienna.

The centenary of Bogrea's death was commemorated with a 2026 cultural event dedicated to his memory in his native Târnauca. The Vasile Bogrea High School, located in the village, was among the organizers of the event.
