= Bukivka =

Commune in Chernivtsi Oblast, Ukraine

Coordinates: 48.0519°N 26.0928°E

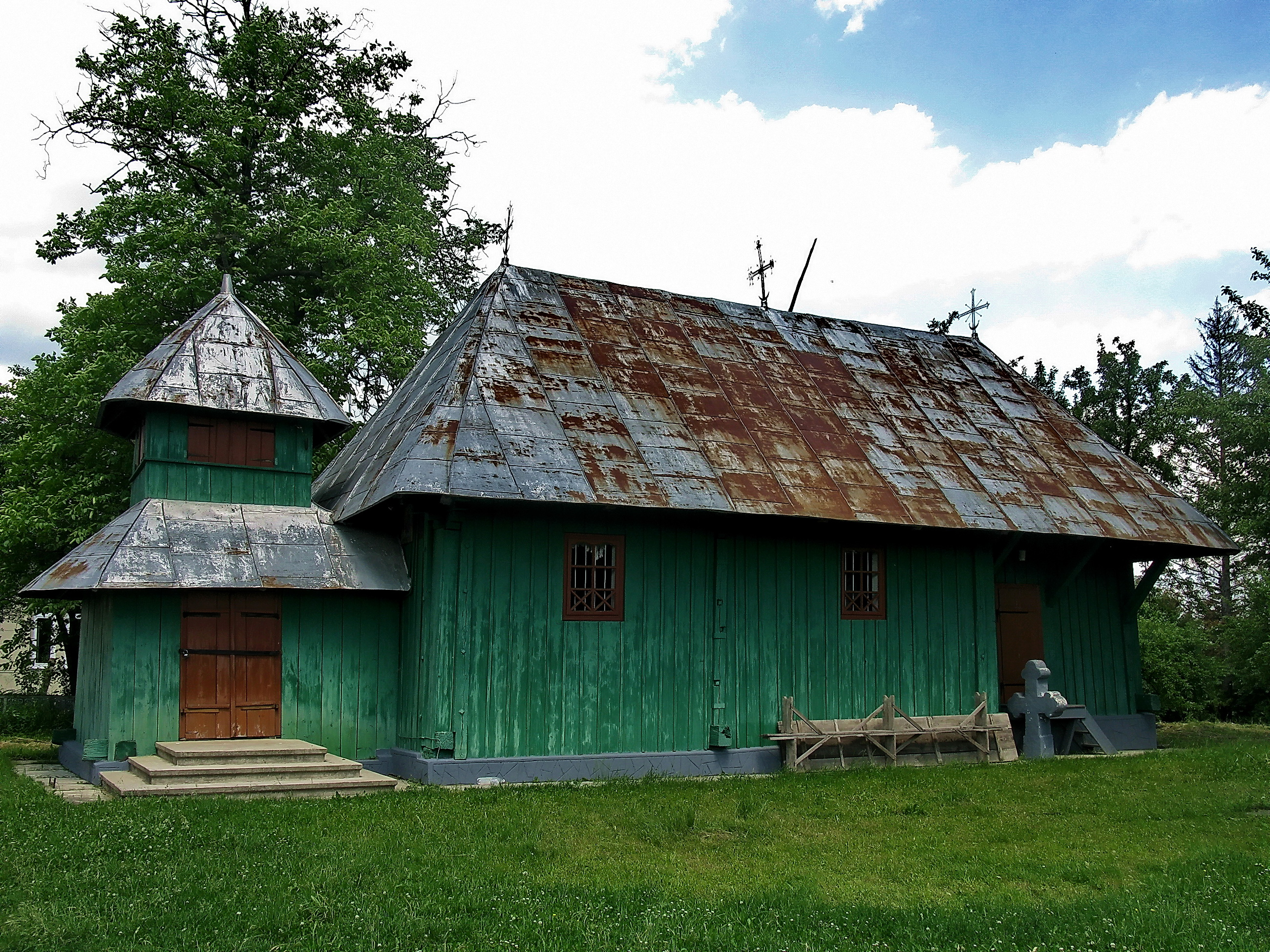
Saint Demeter wooden church

Bukivka (Ukrainian: Буківка; Romanian: Poieni or Poieni-Bucovina) is a commune (selsoviet) in Chernivtsi Raion, Chernivtsi Oblast, Ukraine. It is composed of a single village, Bukivka, and belongs to the Terebleche rural hromada, one of the hromadas of Ukraine.

Until 18 July 2020, Bukivka belonged to Hertsa Raion. The raion was abolished in July 2020 as part of the administrative reform of Ukraine, which reduced the number of raions of Chernivtsi Oblast to three. The area of Hertsa Raion was merged into Chernivtsi Raion. Terebleche rural hromada, however, belonged to Hlyboka Raion, which was also abolished and merged into Chernivtsi Raion. In 2001, 96.44% of the inhabitants spoke Romanian as their native language, while 3.01% spoke Ukrainian.

== See also ==
- Hertsa region
- Dorohoi County
- Hertsa raion
- Romanians in Ukraine
