= Kulykivka, Chernivtsi Oblast =

Commune in Chernivtsi Oblast, Ukraine

Coordinates: 48.0947°N 26.1672°E

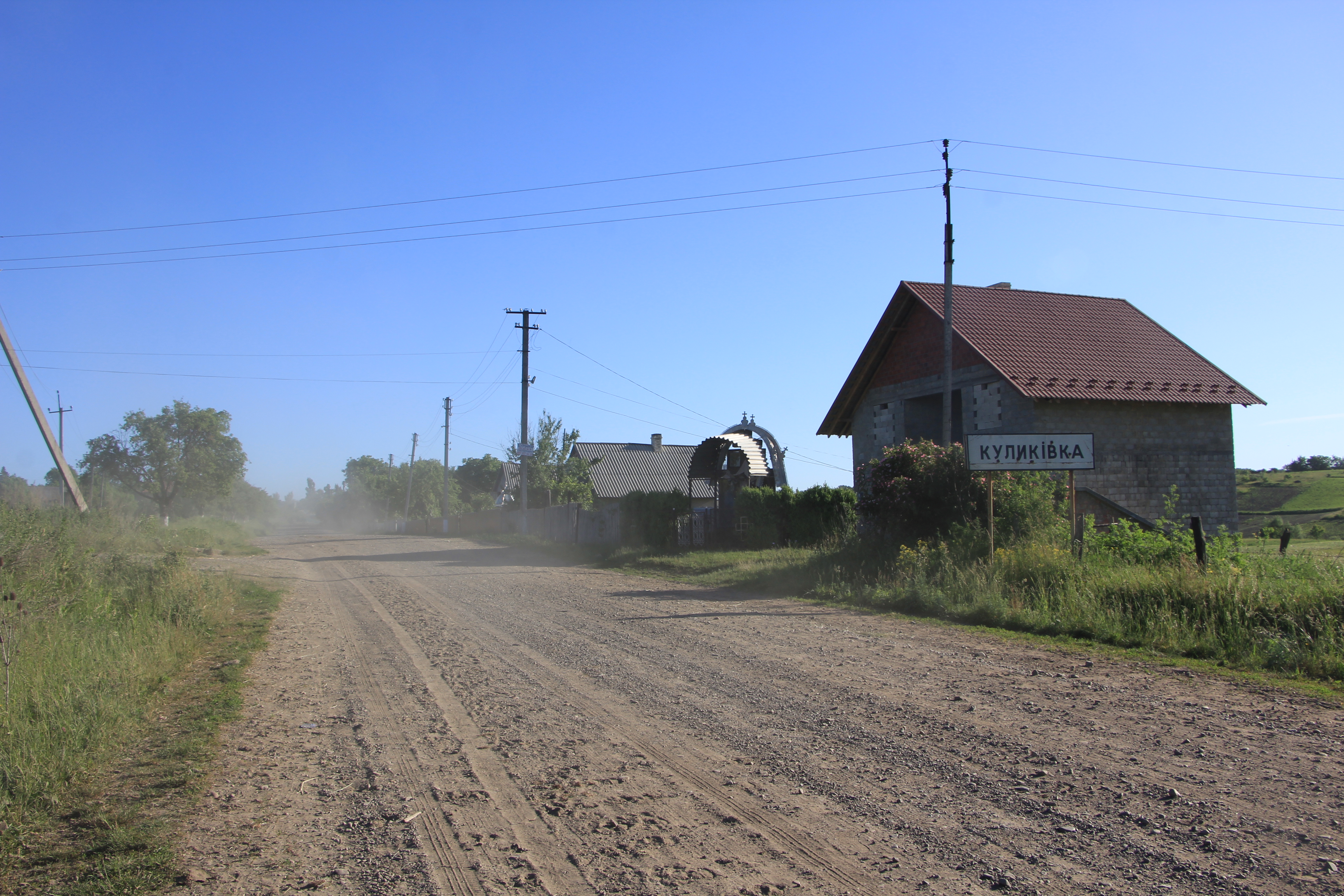
Sign at the entrance to the village of Kulykivka

Kulykіvka (Ukrainian: Куликівка; Romanian: Culiceni) is a commune (selsoviet) in Chernivtsi Raion, Chernivtsi Oblast, Ukraine. It is composed of a single village, Kulykіvka, and belongs to Hertsa urban hromada, one of the hromadas of Ukraine.

Until 18 July 2020, Kulykivka belonged to Hertsa Raion. The raion was abolished in July 2020 as part of the administrative reform of Ukraine, which reduced the number of raions of Chernivtsi Oblast to three. The area of Hertsa Raion was merged into Chernivtsi Raion. In 2001, 96.17% of the inhabitants spoke Romanian as their native language, while 3.15% spoke Ukrainian.
