= Hertsa =

City in Chernivtsi Oblast, Ukraine

Hertsa Герца Herța
- City
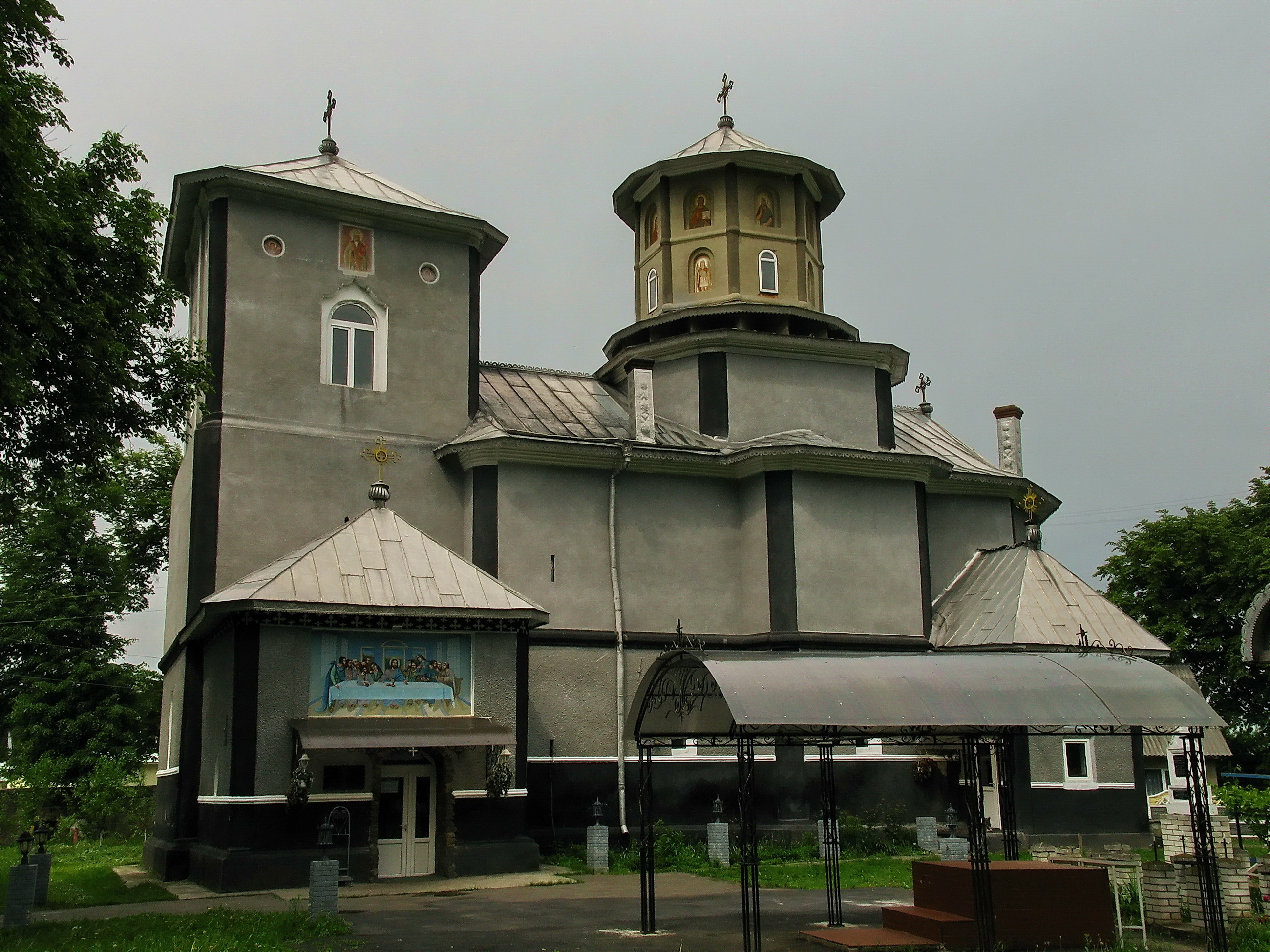
- Saint Spiridon Church

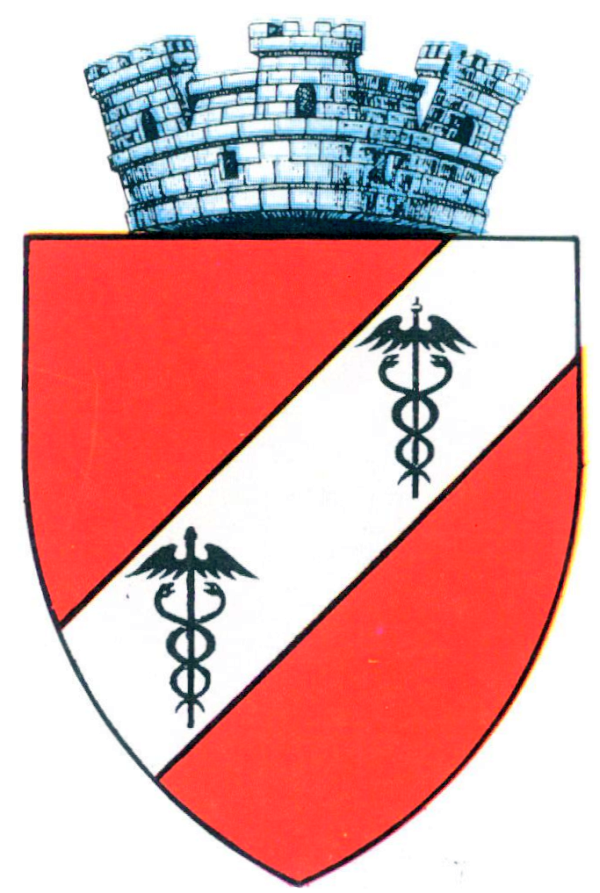
- Coat of arms
- Interactive map of Hertsa
- Location of Hertsa Hertsa (Ukraine)
- Coordinates: 48°09′00″N 26°15′00″E
- Country: Ukraine
- Oblast: Chernivtsi Oblast
- Raion: Chernivtsi Raion
- Hromada: Hertsa urban hromada

Government
  - Mayor: Vasil Scripcaru (48°09′00″N 26°15′00″E)

Area
  - Total: 22.23 km^{2} (8.58 sq mi)
- Elevation: 159 m (522 ft)

Population (2022)
  - Total: 2,097
- Postal code: 60500

Hertsa or Hertza (Ukrainian: Герца, IPA: [ˈɦɛrtsɐ]; Romanian: Herța, IPA: [ˈhertsa]) is a city located in Chernivtsi Raion, Chernivtsi Oblast in western Ukraine and has a population of 2,097 (2022 estimate).

The city is located close to the border with Romania, 28 km (17 mi) southeast of Chernivtsi and 21 km (13 mi) north of Dorohoi. Until 2020, it was the least populous raion administrative center in Ukraine.

== History ==
The Hertsa region was part of the Moldavia historical region. In 1859, Moldavia united with Wallachia, forming the United Principalities of Moldavia and Walachia, which after the Romanian War of Independence became the Kingdom of Romania, with Hertsa being incorporated into the Dorohoi County, and then into Ținutul Suceava.

In June 1940, it was annexed by the Soviet Union together with Northern Bukovina and Bessarabia, although this territory was not mentioned in the Soviet ultimatum or in the Molotov–Ribbentrop Pact, being an integral part of the Old Kingdom. The Red Army also occupied this land, probably due to its strategic position over the city of Cernăuți and attached it to the Ukrainian SSR. The Romanian Army liberated the region in June 1941, during the first days of Operation Barbarossa. In August 1944, the Soviet Union reoccupied the city during the Second Jassy–Kishinev offensive. The number of deportees to the Soviet north and east from the Hertsa raion in its boundaries from earliy 2020 of the Chernivtsi oblast on June 13, 1941, was 1,373; 219 (15.95%) of them would later die in Siberia and Kazakhstan. Among the 1,373 deportees from Hertsa Raion, 120 were of unknown nationality; among the 1,253 people whose nationality was known, 1090 (86.99%) were ethnic Romanians, 125 were ethnic Jews (9.98%), 31 were ethnic Ukrainians (2.474%), 4 were ethnic Russians (0.32%), 2 were ethnic Germans (0.02%) and 1 was ethnically Polish (0.08%).

Almost all the Jews who lived in the town of Hertsa (1,204) and in the rest of the Hertsa area (14), which were under Soviet rule in 1940-1941 and in 1944-1991, on September 1, 1941, were deported to Transnistria by the Romanian authorities, where most of them died; only 450 were alive in December 1943 (according to Andrei Corbea-Hoisie), when the repatriation of the Jews to Dorohoi County, including these people, by the Romanian authorities started, while about 800 Jews died. However, the number of about 1,200 Jews were not individuals counted in the town; on August 11, 1941, there were 1,200 Jews from Herta in the concentration camp in Secureni in Northern Bessarabia. The Romanian army and authorities killed about 100 Jews on July 5, 1941, before the deportation to Transnistria. The Yad Vashem database lists the names of 102 Jews from Hertsa who were killed in Hertsa. Moreover, 483 Jews from Hertsa and the neighboring villages died in Ukraine, including Transnistria, because of the deportations according to the Yad Vashem website. For the entire Dorohoi County ("Judet"), a large majority of which remained in Romania, 6,425 Jews survived the deportations to Transnistria, while 5,131 died between September 6, 1940, and August 23, 1944, during the Antonescu dictatorship, overwhelmingly due to the deportations of 1941 and 1942.

The Yad Vashem database lists the identities of 843 Jews from Herta who died during World War II. It lists the identities of five Jews from Herta who were killed by the Soviet authorities in Siberia, and of 461 who died in Ukraine, including Transnistria, because of the deportations. For more information on the Holocaust in Transnistria, including on the fate of the Jewish deportees from Romania, see History of the Jews in Transnistria. According to the newest data, out of 1,650 Jews of the town of Hertsa who were deported to Transnistria (which excludes those who were executed before that), about 800 died in Transnistria.

From 1962 until December 1991, Hertsa was part of Hlyboka Raion. Since the dissolution of the Soviet Union, it has been part of independent Ukraine. Until 18 July 2020, Hertsa served as an administrative center of Hertsa Raion. The raion was abolished in July 2020 as part of the administrative reform of Ukraine, which reduced the number of raions of Chernivtsi Oblast to three. The area of Hertsa Raion was merged into Chernivtsi Raion.

On 26 January 2024, a new law entered into force which abolished the status of some urban-type settlements, and the more populous other mostly ethnically Romanian cities, Krasnoilsk, formerly of Storozhynets Raion until 2020, and Solotvyno in Tiachiv Raion in Zakarpattia Oblast became rural settlements.

Hertsa has a Romanian-language newspaper, Gazeta de Herța. (Note: Website: https://gazetadeherta.com/)

== Demographics ==
In 1969, Hertsa had 1,500 inhabitants. In January 1989, the population was 2,360 people, while in January 2013, the population was 2,122 people.

As of 2001, the majority of the inhabitants (71.18%, or 1,445 people) identified themselves as Romanians, 17.88% (or 363 people) as Ukrainians, 6.35% (or 129 people) as Russians and 3.4% (or 69 people) as Moldovans. According to the 2001 census, the majority of the population of Herțsa (2,030 inhabitants overall) was Romanian-speaking (70.79% or 1,437 people, including 68.08%, or 1,382 people, who called their language Romanian, and 2.71%, or 55 people, who called it "Moldovan"), with Ukrainian (17.98%, or 365 people) and Russian speakers (10.89%, or 221 people) in the minority. In the last Soviet census of 1989, out of 2,122 inhabitants, 409 declared themselves Ukrainians (14.27%), 1,327 Romanians (62.54%), 116 Moldovans (5.47%), and 222 Russians (10.46%). The decline in the number and proportion of Moldovans was explained by a switch from a census Moldovan to a census Romanian ethnic identity, and has continued after the 2001 census. Hertsa is the only city in Ukraine that is mostly ethnically Romanian as well as the only one that is mostly Romanian-speaking.

According to the 2001 Ukrainian census, out of 17,519 inhabitants of the Hertsa urban territorial hromada, established in 2020, 16,627 spoke Romanian as their mother tongue (94.91%), out of which 16,485 inhabitants (94.06%) called the language Romanian and 142 (0.81%) called it "Moldovan". Moreover, 572 inhabitants were Ukrainian-speaking (3.27%), 298 were Russian-speaking (0.17%), while 25 spoke other languages (0.14%).

== Notable people ==
- Gheorghe Asachi (1788–1869), Moldavian and later Romanian prose writer, poet, painter, historian, dramatist, engineer, and translator
- Herman Finer (1898–1969), Jewish Romanian-born British political scientist and Fabian socialist
- Moishe Goldblatt (1896–1974), Soviet Jewish actor and director
- Lucas Gridoux (1896–1952), Romanian-born French stage and film actor

== Gallery ==
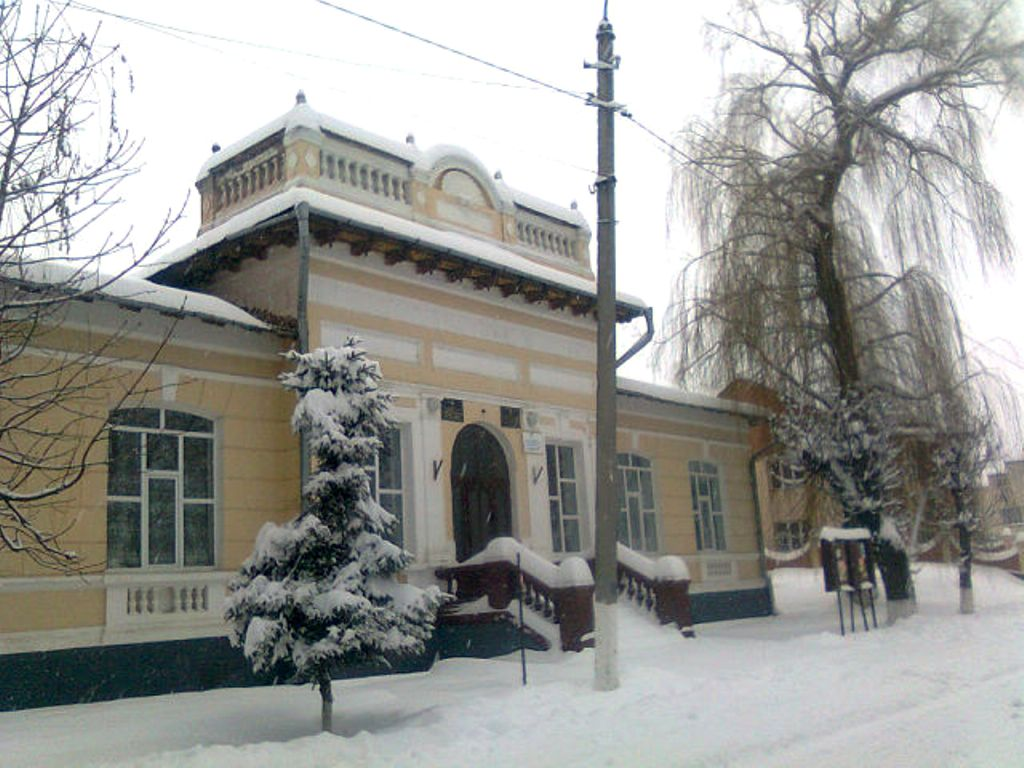
Former synagogue, now Palace of Culture

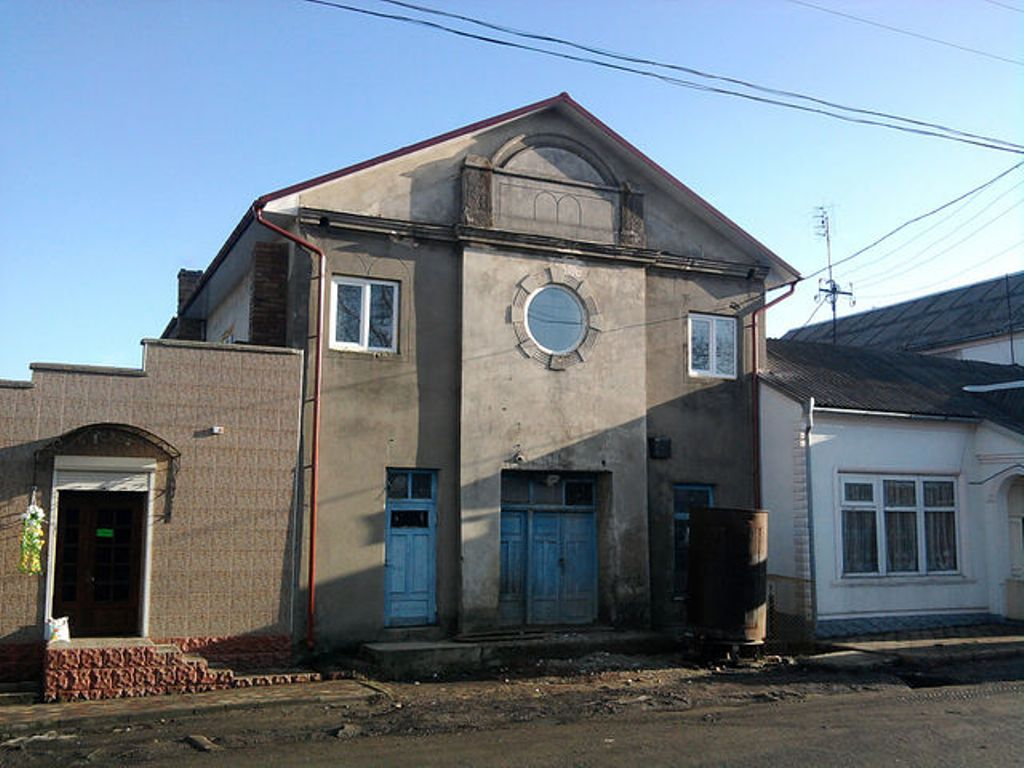
Former synagogue

== See also ==
- Hertsa region
- Dorohoi County
- Hertsa raion
- Romanians in Ukraine
- History of the Jews in Transnistria
- History of the Jews in Bukovina
