= Gheorghe Sion =

Moldavian-born Romanian poet, playwright, translator and memoiris (1822–1892)

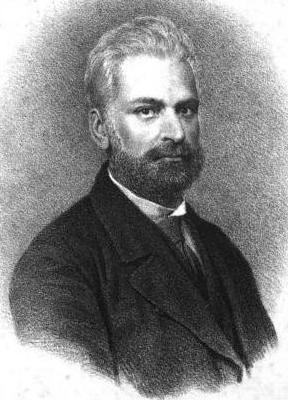
Portrait of Sion

Gheorghe Sion (May 22, 1822 – October 1, 1892) was a Moldavian, later Romanian poet, playwright, translator and memoirist.

He was born in Mamornița to paharnic (royal cup-bearer) Ioniță Sion and his wife Eufrosina (née Schina), the daughter of Filiki Eteria member Gheorghe Schina. His uncles included Constantin Sion, author of a semi-fictitious noble genealogy (Arhondologia Moldovei); and spătar Antohi Sion, the rumored author of Izvodul lui Clănău, an outright forgery. After spending two years (1837-1839) at Saint Sava College in Bucharest, the capital of Wallachia, he returned to his native Moldavia. Entering the Iași-based provincial administration, he became a copyist at the Justice Department in 1842, followed by work as a clerk at the Interior Department. He became a wanted man for his participation in the 1848 revolution, and so fled to Austrian-ruled Transylvania. He returned to Iași in 1849, working as bureau chief at the Department of Church Property and Public Education. From 1855, he worked at the State Archives.

Subsequently, around the time of the Union of the Principalities, Sion moved to Bucharest, where his posts included membership in the Appeals Court and, from 1866, head of the Tobacco Monopoly Company. In 1868, he was elected a titular member of the Romanian Academy. In Bucharest, he founded Revista Carpaților in 1860 and, together with V. A. Urechia, published Transacțiuni literare și științifice starting in 1872. His volumes included poetry (Ciasurile de mulțămire a lui Gheorghe Sion, 1844; Din poeziile lui Gheorghe Sion, 1857), plays (Influința morală, 1869; La Plevna!, 1878; Dramatice, 1879; Sărutarea, 1888), a travel book (Suvenire de călătoria în Basarabia meridională, 1857), and memoirs (Suvenire contimpurane, 1888).
