= History of the Jews in Transnistria =

The location of Transnistria (red) in Europe

The history of the Jews in Transnistria is mainly connected to the history of the Jews in Moldova, the history of the Jews in Ukraine, the history of the Jews in Romania and the history of the Jews in the Soviet Union, the Holocaust in Transnistria as well as to countries in several other neighboring areas.

== Background ==
Transnistria, or Transdniestria, officially the Pridnestrovian Moldavian Republic, (Note: See more on names section.) is a primarily unrecognized state that split off from Moldova after the dissolution of the USSR and mostly consists of a narrow strip of land between the river Dniester and the territory of Ukraine. Transnistria has been recognized by three other mostly non-recognized states: Abkhazia, Artsakh, and South Ossetia. The region is considered by the UN to be part of Moldova.

On 30 May 2022, Aleksandr Rozenberg became the Prime Minister of Transnistria, being the first Jewish person to hold this position.

=== Tiraspol mass graves ===
In 2022, two mass graves were discovered in Tiraspol, totaling over 200 victims. According to the sources, the victims were killed between 1917 and 1930, on the orders of Lenin and Stalin, most of them being anti-communist Jews.

== Related information ==
=== Jews in Moldova ===
The history of the Jews in Moldova reaches back several centuries. Bessarabian Jews have been living in the area for some time. Today, the Jewish community living in Moldova number less than 4,000 according to one estimate, while local estimates put the number at 15–20,000 Jews and their family members.

=== Jews in Romania ===
The history of the Jews in Romania concerns the Jews both of Romania and of Romanian origins, from their first mention on what is present-day Romanian territory. Jewish communities existed in Romanian territory in the 2nd century AD. Minimal until the 18th century, the size of the Jewish population increased after around 1850, and more especially after the establishment of Greater Romania in the aftermath of World War I. A diverse community, albeit an overwhelmingly urban one, Jews were a target of religious persecution and racism in Romanian society – from the late-19th century debate over the "Jewish Question" and the Jewish residents' right to citizenship, to the genocide carried out in the lands of Romania as part of the Holocaust. The latter, coupled with successive waves of aliyah, has accounted for a dramatic decrease in the overall size of Romania's present-day Jewish community.

=== Jews in Ukraine ===
The history of the Jews in Ukraine goes back over a thousand years. Jewish communities have existed in the territory of Ukraine from the time of Kievan Rus' (late 9th to mid-13th century) and developed many of the most distinctive modern Jewish theological and cultural traditions such as Hasidism. According to the World Jewish Congress, the Jewish community in Ukraine constitute the third biggest Jewish community in Europe and the fifth biggest in the world.

=== Jews in Russia ===
The history of the Jews in Russia and on areas historically connected with it goes back at least 1500 years. The presence of Jewish people in the European part of Russia can be traced to the 7th–14th centuries CE. Jews in Russia have historically constituted a large religious diaspora; the vast territories of the Russian Empire at one time hosted the largest population of Jews in the world. Within these territories the primarily Ashkenazi Jewish communities of many different areas flourished and developed many of modern Judaism's most distinctive theological and cultural traditions, while also facing periods of anti-Semitic discriminatory policies and persecutions. The largest group among Russian Jews are Ashkenazi Jews, but the community also includes a significant proportion of other non-Ashkenazi from other Jewish diaspora including Mountain Jews, Sephardic Jews, Crimean Karaites, Krymchaks, Bukharan Jews, and Georgian Jews.

=== Jews in Bessarabia ===
The history of the Jews in Bessarabia, a historical region in Eastern Europe, dates back hundreds of years. Jews are mentioned from very early in the Principality of Moldavia, but they did not represent a significant number. Their main activity in Moldavia was commerce, but they could not compete with Greeks and Armenians, who had knowledge of Levantine commerce and relationships.

=== Bukovinian, Bessarabian and Dorohoi Jews Deported to Transnistria between the Dniester and Bug Rivers (1941-1944) ===
According to some sources, about 57,000 Jews from Bukovina were deported to Transnistria by the Romanian authorities by November 1941. This number included the Jews of town of Hertsa and the Hertsa region, as well as a part of the Edinet camp Jews of Hotin County of northern Bessarabia as well as a part of the Jews of Dorohoi county; only 5,500 of the Jews were listed as having been deported out of Dorohoi County, though the number was much higher (see below). The number of Jewish deportees to Transnistria sent there who reached the latter province included 110,033 people, including 55,867 from Bessarabia, 43,798 from Bukovina, 10,368 from Dorohoi (minus the Hertsa area); out of these, 50,741 still survived by September 1, 1943. In November 1943, according to General Constantin Vasiliu, undersecretary of state for police and security in the Ministry of the Interior, if one includes the Jews deported from Dorohoi in 1942, but excluding the Hertsa area, 10,368 Jews were deported from the county, while if one includes the Jews of Hertsa, about 12,000 or more were deported. On May 20, 1942, 204 Jews from Chisinau were deported to Transnistria, while on July 10, 1942, other 27 Chisinau Jews were deported to Transnistria; the total number of Jews deported by train from Chisinau to Transnistria in 1942 was 231. In 1942, it was decided that 753 Bessarabian Jews (96 urban and 657 rural) would not be deported, while 26 Bessarabian Jews who were slated for deportation were not deported. All the Jews deported from Chernivtsi in 1941 were deported by train; half of the transports went to Atachi, typically middle-class people, many of whom were able to take lei and valuables into Transnistria (just like the southern Bukovinian Jews), directly on the border with Transnistria, from where they crossed the border into Transnistria, and were not beaten and forced to buy food at high prices in a transit camp. The other half, mostly working class individuals, were sent to the transit camp in Marculesti transit camp, where most gave up much of their jewelry and precious metals in exchange for food, and were often beaten and plundered by Romanian gendarmes, and from where they walked to nearby Atachi to be sent across the river to Transnistria. A further 4,290 Chernivtsi Jews were deported to Transnistria in June 1942. About 16,794 of the Jews were allowed to stay in Chernivtsi, and 17,159 in Bukovina in its historical borders, after that.

According to the Romanian gendarmerie, on September 1, 1943, 50,741 Jewish deportees survived in Transnistria, including 36,761 from Bukovina, including Dorohoi County (historically a part of the Old Kingdom of Romania, but administratively a part of Bukovina at that time), and 13,980 from Bessarabia. According to the statistics from the office of the Romanian prime minister of November 15, 1943, by province of origin from Romania and of county of residence in Transnistria, in the latter area there were 49,927 Jewish deportees who had survived, including 31,141 from Bukovina (without Dorohoi County, but including Hotin County), 11,683 from Bessarabia (without Hotin County), 6,425 from Dorohoi County, and 678 from the rest of Romania. The same document indicates that there were 706 Jews sent there from the rest of Romania (the Old Kingdom and southern Transylvania) in the camp at Grosulovo, which brings the total number of Jews deported from Romania still alive in Transnistria to 50,633. By the time Bukovina was retaken by Soviet forces in February 1944, some sources are suggesting that less than half of the entire Jewish population in the region had survived. According to the Shoah Resource Center of Yad Vashem, about half of the Jews of Bukovina died. About 1,500 Jews from Chernivtsi converted to Christianity to be saved from deportation to Transnistria. According to Jean Ancel, hundreds, probably thousands, of Bessarabian and Transnistrian, and to a lesser extent Bukovinian Jewish children were handed over by their parents to non-Jews in order to guarantee their survival.

Most of the survivors went to Romania after the war, where the more liberal policies allowed emigration to Israel. The list of the Jewish deportees to Transnistria from Bukovina at a memorial dedicated to them in the city of Siret includes 51,089 names provided by Yad Vashem in 2024. The number of Jews listed by name who died or were killed in the Holocaust or Soviet repression who had lived in (historical) northern and southern Bukovina before the war in the Yad Vashem database as of 2025 was 50,749, whereas 7 died indirectly died because of the Holocaust, and 1,707 were "registered following the evacuation/ in the Interior of the Soviet Union". According to the Yad Vashem database, 26,387 Jews whose names are listed who had lived in Bukovina before the war died in Ukraine (including Transnistria) during the Holocaust. The number of Bukovinian Jews whose death was caused by the Soviet authorities is unknown, but 86 died in Siberia, while others died in Central Asia, etc. According to the Yad Vashem database, 60,732 Jews whose names are listed who had lived in Bessarabia before the war were killed during World War II, while 133 died indirectly in relation to the Holocaust. The number of the Bessarabian Jewish victims of the Holocaust exceeded that of the Bukovinian ones.

According to the foremost Israeli scholarly study on the Holocaust by Leni Yahil, almost 60,000 Jewish deportees survived in Transnistria. According to the Encyclopedia of the Holocaust, 55,000 to 60,000 of the Jewish deportees to Transnistria survived the Holocaust. Another estimate of the total number of Bessarabian Jews who survived the deportations to Transnistria was 20,000, which also indicates that a large majority of the deportees died in Transnistria. The ones who died did so in the most inhuman and horrible conditions. (In the same ghettos and camps there were many Jews from that region as well, responsibility for whose death lies on the Romanian authorities that occupied it in 1941–44.) According to Wolf Moskovich, Professor of Russian and Slavic Studies at the Hebrew University of Jerusalem, in the article "Bessarabia", in The YIVO Encyclopedia of Jews in Eastern Europe, "Only a third of the deported Jews survived Transnistria." According to Wolf Moskovich in the same article, "In all, some 100,000 Bessarabian Jews perished during World War II."

Bessarabian Jews had the worst fate (see below). The deportation of the Chisinau Jews (and of Bessarabian Jews as a whole) to Transnistria, which was done by peasant carts and on foot (unlike in the case of the Jews of southern Bukovina, Chernivtsi, Storojinet and Dorohoi, which was done by train) reduced its Jewish population from 11,388 in the fall of 1941 to 177 in 1943; a large majority of the deportees died according to Jean Ancel. Out of 55,867 Jews who crossed into Transnistria from Bessarabia in 1941, only 13,980 had survived by September 1, 1943; this was a catastrophe.

There were significant differences in the survival rates in Transnistria depending on the place of origin in Bukovina. About 60% of the Jewish deportees to Transnistria from the city of Chernivtsi died there according to the Jewish Virtual Library. According to Gali Mir-Tibon, most of the Jews deported from the city of Chernivtsi, as well as northern Bukovina in general, to Transnistria did not survive. All the Jews deported from Chernivtsi in 1941 and 1942 were deported by train; half of the 1941 transports and all the 1942 ones went to Otaci (Atachi at that time), typically middle-class people, many of whom were able to take lei and valuables into Transnistria (just like the southern Bukovinian Jews), directly on the border with Transnistria, from where they crossed the border into Transnistria, and were not beaten and forced to buy food at high prices in a transit camp. The other half, mostly working class individuals, were sent to the Marculesti transit camp, where most gave up much of their jewelry and precious metals in exchange for food, and were often beaten and plundered by Romanian gendarmes, and from where they walked to nearby Atachi to be sent across the river to Transnistria. According to the Yad Vashem database, 19,424 Jews who had lived in Chernivtsi before the war whose names are listed died in the Holocaust. In southern Bukovina, the area that was not annexed by the Soviet Union (but excluding Dorohoi County), there were 18,140 Jews according to the April 6, 1941 general population census; on May 20, 1942, on the day of the census of the Jews, after the deportations to Transnistria, there were 179 Jews. According to a Romanian government report of November 20, 1943, more than 12,000 of them had survived; in addition to those, there were some southern Bukovinian orphans, who were treated as a part of a different category. If one includes the Jewish orphans from southern Bukovina, according to a study, 70% of the southern Bukovinian Jews survived the deportation to Transnistria. According to another study, over 70% of the Jews of southern Bukovina deported to Transnistria survived.

In 1941–1944, Dorohoi County, historically a part of the Old Kingdom of Romania, was officially/administratively a part of Bukovina. Almost all the Jews who lived in the town of Hertsa (1,204) and in the rest of the Hertsa area (14), which were under Soviet rule in 1940-1941 and in 1944–1991, on September 1, 1941, were deported to Transnistria by the Romanian authorities, where most of them died; only 450 were alive in December 1943, when the repatriation of the Jews to Dorohoi County by the Romanian authorities started, while about 800 Jews died. The Romanian army and authorities killed 100 Jews in the town of Hertsa on July 5, 1941, before the deportation to Transnistria. For the entire Dorohoi County ("Judet"), a large majority of which remained in Romania, 6,425 Jews survived the deportations to Transnistria, while 5,131 died between September 6, 1940, and August 23, 1944, during the Antonescu dictatorship, overwhelmingly due to the deportations of 1941 and 1942. After the November 1941 deportations of Jews from Dorohoi County (9,367 Jews) and June 1942 (360 Jews), excluding the Jews from the Herta area that had been under Soviet occupation, 2,316 Jews were not deported. There is a list of about 3,000 Jews deported from Dorohoi. At the end of 1943, 6,053 Jews deported from Dorohoi County (excluding a large majority of the Jews from the Hertsa area) were returned by the Romanian authorities to the county. Jean Ancel has shown that the decision to deport the Jews of Dorohoi county in 1941 "originated form local government officials, such as members of the military, civil servants and lawyers". It was authorized by Governor Calotescu of Bukovina. When Romania's military dictator Ion Antonescu (who had ordered the 1941 deportations of the Bessarabian and Bukovinian Jews to Transnistria) was informed of the deportations, and an intervention by Jewish leader Wilhelm Filderman and a National Peasant Party politician, he ordered that the Jews who were about to board the train not be deported to Transnistria. The 1942 deportations of Jews from Dorohoi County seem not to have been ordered by Ion Antonescu, who nevertheless ordered the deportations of Chernivtsi and Chisinau Jews in that year. In the book by the great late Holocaust scholar Raul Hilberg, the dean of Holocaust studies, cites Antonescu's statement in the meeting of the Council of Ministers of November 17, 1943; Antonescu stated in reference to the Jews of Dorohoi County, "Those from Old Roumania, who have been removed by mistake, will be brought back to their homes."

About 3,000 Jews who resided in Mohyliv-Podilskyi were sent in May–June 1942 to the nearby concentration camp in Skazinets, and about half of them died in there. All of the 560 Jews who died in the Skazinets concentration camp in the summer and early fall of 1942 after being deported there in late May and early June 1942 whose names appear in the Yad Vashem database had been sent there from Mohyliv-Podilskyi. While a large majority of the Jews who died in the Pechora concentration camp (discussed in the next section) were native Ukrainian Jews, 523 of the dead Jews listed in the Yad Vashem database had lived in Romania before the war; among these, 271 had lived in Bukovina and 128 had lived in Bessarabia. Moreover, 82 had lived in Dorohoi and the neighboring localities.

For more information on the history of the Jews of the city of Chernivtsi, the historical capital of Bukovina, and the capital of the present-day Chernivtsi Oblast of Ukraine, mainly during the Holocaust, see History of the Jews in Chernivtsi. One of the ghettos with a mostly Bukovinian Jewish population about which there is the most information in Wikipedia is Shargorod. The largest ghetto, about which there is also a great deal of information in Wikipedia, also with a mostly Bukovinian Jewish population, was the one in Mogilev-Podolski/Mohyliv-Podilskyi. For information on the history of the Jews of Chisinau, the capital of Bessarabia and of the present-day Republic of Moldova, including during the Holocaust, see History of the Jews in Chișinău.

According to Jean Ancel, tens of thousands, possibly over 60,000, of the Jewish deportees from Romania died because of typhus by the beginning of April 1942. By the end of March and the beginning of April 1942 (on March 22 in Mohyliv-Podilskyi for medication, two weeks before that for money), money and medication arrived for the deportees from the Jewish community of Romania.

=== The Transnistrian Jewish Victims of the Holocaust ===
According to Julius Fisher, "Of the local Jewish population, the data show that 130,000 died the death of martyrs", out of which 70,000 were murdered by the Romanian forces (the Romanian incomplete official statistics indicate a minimum number of 68,866) and 40,000 by the Germans, who also murdered at least 18,800 Jews deported to Transnistria.

While the number of the dead regardless of ethnicity in the Odessa massacre of October 22–24, 1941, was larger, according to Julius Fisher, Transnistria, The Forgotten Cemetery, 20,000 Jews were killed in the massacre. According to the Yad Vashem data base, the number of Jews killed in the city of Odessa whose names are known was 20,334. Given that about 25,000 individuals were executed in Odessa, the difference between that number and the number of Jews who were executed were individuals of other ethnicities. According to the Black Book, "An announcement was hung up on the walls saying that three hundred Russians or five hundred Jews would be hanged for every officer killed". By the end of World War II, only 5,000 of the Jews of Odessa who did not retreat with the Soviet forces were still alive, overwhelmingly because of the later killings described below.

In December 1941, a few cases of typhus, which is a disease spread by lice and fleas, broke out in the Bogdanovka concentration camp. A decision was made by the German adviser to the Romanian administration of the district, and the Romanian District Commissioner to murder all the inmates. The Aktion began on 21 December, and was carried out by Romanian soldiers, gendarmes, Ukrainian police, civilians from Golta, and local ethnic Germans under the commander of the Ukrainian regular police, Kazachievici. Thousands of disabled and ill inmates were forced into two locked stables, which were doused with kerosene and set ablaze, burning alive all those inside. Other inmates were led in groups to a ravine in a nearby forest and shot in their necks. The remaining Jews dug pits with their bare hands in the bitter cold, and packed them with frozen corpses. Thousands of Jews froze to death. A break was made for Christmas, but the killing resumed on 28 December. By 31 December, over 40,000 Jews had been killed. Overall, at least 40,000-48,000, and perhaps as many as 54,000, Jews were killed in the Bogdanovka concentration camp. A large majority of the Jews who were killed were originally from Transnistria, but 7,000 or more were from Bessarabia. Perhaps only 50 Jews who burned the bodies of the massacred Jews survived.

During World War II, 14,000-18,000 overwhelmingly local Jews were murdered on the spot in Domanivka in the winter of 1941–1942, until February 1942. A minority of the Jews who were killed were Bessarabian Jews. The victims were killed, mainly by the Romanian constabulary, the Romanian army supported by Ukrainian militia and the Sonderkommando. The camp was liberated on March 28, 1944, by the Red Army. According to Jean Ancel, "about five hundred Jews were still alive, mostly expellees from Romania."

Out of about 4,000 in the camp at Akmetchetka in April 1942, only a few hundred were still alive in May 1942; the rest died of hunger and poor quality food (raw potatoes), exhaustion and poor living conditions (they lived in pigsties and warehouses). According to the newer research in the Encyclopedia of Camps and Ghettos, 1933-1945 from 2018, 4,000 Jews died in the Pechora concentration camp in Tulcin Judet County in northern Transnistria in 1941–1944, whereas about 200 died from February 1944 and March 1944, when the Soviets returned to the area; this excludes about 1,250 Jews who were handed over to the Germans, who exterminated them elsewhere. The Yad Vashem database lists the names of 4,554 Jews who died in the camp. Out of these, 2,651 were Ukrainian Jews according to the Yad Vashem database.

About 30,000 Jews from Odessa and thousands of Jews from Berezovka County and elsewhere, mainly from other places in southern Transnistria (perhaps 10,000), were evacuated by the Romanian authorities to various localities in Berezovka Judet/County (unless they were from there) and were executed by the Germans. According to the Black Book, edited by Ilya Ehrenburg and Vasily Gorssman, 27,000 Jews were executed in the Berezovka district by the local ethnic Germans. According to Nora Levin, who wrote the first book about the Holocaust that focused not mostly on the perpetrators, but mostly on the Jewish victims, about 28,000 Jews were killed in the ethnic German colonies in Transnistria. Raul Hilberg, citing a German Foreign Office document, provides the same number of 28,000. Radu Ioanid estimates the number of such executed Jews in the Berezovka district/couty at 31,000, though this number also included deportees from Romania, including the Old Kingdom. According to the data provided by Jean Ancel, out of 32,819 Jews deported by the Romanian authorities from Odessa in early 1942 to Berezovka County, only 1,544 survived until April 1942, and 425 survived until March 22, 1943, which means that 32,394 died.

Small numbers of Jews from Odessa were sent by the Romanian authorities to places in central and northern Transnistria. For example, among the Jews who had lived in Odessa during the war, 54 died in Balta. Among the Jews who had lived in Odessa during the war, 32 died in Bershad. In the first major study of the Holocaust in English, Gerald Reitlinger wrote that thousands of the Jews from Odessa, that "the Jews were distributed among the Transndniestrian towns with the deportees from Rumania. Reitlinger, a British Jewish scholar of the Holocaust, claimed that "(N)o attempt was made to exterminate" this small group of "Jews of Odessa". In early 1942, a few hundred Jews originally from Odessa were sent to the Vapniarka concentration camp. Many of them died; a Jew originally from Odessa died in Vapniarka in September 1942.

According to Julius Fisher, the Germans executed numerous other Jews in northern Transnistria, overwhelmingly deportees from Romania, including 12,000 at Bar, 1,230 at Garisin, 3,000 in Ladjin/Ladyzhyn, and 200 in Tulcin. According to Radu Ioanid, Romanian complicity was not proven in the killing of the 12,000 Jews on October 20, 1942, mentioned above in Bar. The Bar massacre was the largest massacre of Jews in northern and central Transnistria. Out of the 1,290 Jews killed at Galisin, Brailov and Bar on November 6, 1942, according to Radu Ioanid, Romanian complicity was "proved only in the case of 40 victims". The Yad Vashem database includes the names of 10,497 Jews who died in Bar. Sometimes, it was not too clear whether the Jews were handed over by the Romanian authorities, seized by the Germans, or chose to go with the Germans (see below). There was the question of the 3,000 Jews from the Ladijin stone quarry who originated from the city of Chernivtsi and Dorohoi County who were transferred by the Germans beyond the Bug on August 19, 1942; Radu Ioanid stated that they were handed over by the Romanians. Nora Levin wrote, 'On August 19, S.S. men penetrated Romanian-administered Transnistria and abducted thousands of Jews and transported them "to the East" to be killed." The testimony of the Holocaust survivor Pepi Summer of Chernivtsi, the Romanian camp commander at the stone quarry tried to save as many Jews from Chernivtsi and Dorohoi as possible, by not handing them over to the Germans despite the German pressure. The testimony of Rakhil Fradis-Milner, originally of Chernivtsi indicates that a large majority of the German-speaking Jews deported from the city of Chernivtsi in the summer of 1942, reacting to beatings and torment from the Romanians, chose to go with the Germans, who promised better treatment, but in fact subsequently killed the Jews through shootings and overwork. "We were lodged in stables and pigsties in the villages of the Tulchin county. We were beaten and tormented. The Germans arrived in the middle of August: they summoned us and asked if we wanted to work. They said they would give us jobs and feed us well.

On November 11, 1942, the deputy prime minister and foreign minister of Romania, Mihai Antonescu, complained to Gustav Richter, the German (and SS) advisor to the Romanian government on Jewish affairs, about the Germans taking Jews from Transnistria across the Bug and executing them. "He even ordered an inquiry into the German massacre of the Jews who had been deported beyond the Bug to the towns to the Uman region."

After the arrival of the Jewish deportees from Romania in 1941, at least 45,000 Jews Jews of northern and central Transnistria were alive, out of which more than 10,000 were killed by the Germans; this left 35,000 Jews alive. According to Jean Ancel, 20,000-22,000 local (Transnistrian) Jews survived the Holocaust. Up to 13,000-15,000 local Jews from northern and central Transnistria died because of typhus and other causes related to the poor treatment of the Jews, excluding the executions. In his synthesis of Holocaust studies, The Holocaust in History, Michael Marrus wrote, "In all, some 75 percent of the Jews of Transnistria perished".

=== The Jews from the Rest of Romania, the Vapniarka Concentration Camp and the 1942-1944 Repatriations ===
In October 1941, the Romanians established a detention camp in Vapniarka. (By that time, the 700 local Jewish inhabitants had fled or had been killed by the Nazi German or Romanian troops.) One thousand Jews were brought to the site that month, mostly from the city of Odessa. Some 200 died in a typhus epidemic; the others were taken out of the camp in two batches, guarded by soldiers of the Romanian Gendarmerie, and shot to death. In 1942, 150 Jews from Bukovina were brought to Vapniarka. On September 16 of that year, 1023 Jews from the Old Kingdom of Romania and southern Transylvania were also brought to the camp. About half had been banished from their homes on suspicion of being communists, but 554 had been included without any specific charges being brought against them. By keeping the camp meticulously clean, the prisoners were able to overcome the typhus epidemic, but they suffered from the poor quality of the food, which included Lathyrus sativus, a species of pea that was normally used to feed livestock, and barley bread that had a 20% straw content. A team of doctors among the inmates, led by Dr. Arthur Kessler of Cernăuţi, reached the conclusion that the disease presented all the symptoms of lathyrism, a spastic paralysis caused by the oxalyldiaminopropionic acid present in the pea fodder. Within a few weeks, the first symptoms of the disease appeared, affecting the bone marrow of prisoners and causing paralysis. By January 1943, hundreds of prisoners were suffering from lathyrism. The inmates declared a hunger strike and demanded medical assistance. As a result, the authorities allowed the Jewish Aid Committee in Bucharest to supply them with medicine, and the prisoners' relatives were allowed to send them parcels. It was only at the end of January that the prisoners were no longer fed with the animal fodder that had caused the disease, but 117 Jews were paralyzed for life.

In March 1943, it was found that 427 Jews had been imprisoned for no reason whatsoever. They were moved to various ghettos in Transnistria, but were sent back to Romania and released only in December 1943–January 1944. In October 1943, when the Soviet Red Army was approaching the region, it was decided to liquidate the camp. 80 Jews were sent to ghettos in Transnistria. 54 Communists were taken to a prison in Rîbnița, Transnistria, where they were killed in their cells by SS men on March 19, 1944. A third group, which included most of the prisoners (565 persons), was moved to Romania in March 1944 and imprisoned in the camp for political prisoners in Târgu Jiu, until after the fall of the Antonescu government in August. According to the Yad Vashem database, the number of Jews who lived in Vapniarka whose names are available, including the deportees, who died in the Holocaust was 92. Julius Fisher indicates that the number of survivors of the Vapniarka concentration camp was 1,656. Given the fact that 150 of these Jews in the Vapniarka concentration camp were Bukovinian (see above), and that 2,216 Jews from the Old Kingdom (minus Dorohoi County) and southern Transylvania were deported to Transnistria in September 1942, it would appear that most of these Jews survived the Holocaust.

Out of 284 Jews from Bucharest deported to Transnistria in 1942 for absenteeism for forced labor (together with their families), 254 survived until repatriation in November 1943. The agricultural engineer Gogleata, who treated the deportees horribly, had in fact been sent by the regime of Romania's military dictator Ion Antonescu to Trasnistria as a form of punishment, after taking part in the Legionary Rebellion of January 1941. The Romanian historian Dumitru Sandru has shown that 12 Jews were deported to Transnistria from the rural territory of Roman County until January 1943. The number of Jews deported from Timisoara in Banat in greater Transylvania to Transnistria was 100. The number of Jews from Timisoara who died in the Holocaust was 25.

Out of 598 Jews of Bessarabian and northern Bukovinian origin from Romania who in 1940 had petitioned to migrate to the Soviet Union (Radu Ioanid's figures), but did not have the opportunity to do so, 582 were killed by the German Nazi SS in Rastadt, after being handed over by the Romanian gendarmes in Mostovoi, both in Berezovka County, on September 22, 1942; only 16 survived. The archival research of Dumitru Sandru indicates that the number of Jews who asked for Soviet citizenship who were deported at the end of September 1942 was 700, out of which 555 were from Bucharest. Except for individual deportations and small group deportations ordered before that date, the Romanian government "called a halt to the deportations to Transnistria" on October 13, 1942.

According to the May 6, 1946 data from the Romanian General Direction of the Police, 547 Bucharest (Ilfov County) Jews died during the Holocaust, overwhelmingly deportees to Transnistria. The same data shows that the number of Jews in the various other counties of the Old Kingdom (excluding Bucuresti/Ilfov, Dorohoi County, which have been discussed above, and Iasi County and Ialomita County, where the deaths were typically caused by the 1941 Iasi pogrom) who died in the Holocaust, overwhelmingly due to the deportations to Transnistria, was (all urban, except for the number of rural Jews) 31 from Bacau County, 23 from Baia County, 133 from Falciu County, 41 from Neamt County, 16 from Vaslui County (4 urban, 12 rural), 1 from Tulcea County, 10 from Prahova County, 12 from Buzau County and 2 from Covurlui County. According to the same data, the number of Jews from the counties of southern Transylvania who died in the Holocaust, typically because of the deportations to Transnistria, was 8 urban Jews from Sibiu County, 25 urban Jews from Timisoara and one rural Jew from Bihor County. On October 10, 1941, Romania's military dictator Ion Antonescu ordered the deportation to Transnistria of the Jews from Bacau County who had been convicted of falsifying military documents. Because of this, six Jews were deported from Bacau for using false identification papers on November 4, 1942, in the last group deportation of Jews to Transnistria. While a large majority of the Jews who died in the Holocaust in the areas under Romanian rule did so in Transnistria, Bessarabia and Bukovina, according to the same document, 4,350 Jews died in Iasi County, in the Iasi pogrom, while about 150 of the survivors of the pogrom died in Ialomita County, where they got on a death train, a total of 4,500, which probably understates the number of the dead. According to the Israeli scholar Gali Mir-Tibon, who wrote a recent scholarly article on the Jewish deportees to Transnistria largely based on some newly available Romanian documents, "There was no clear and consistent policy of the Romanian central government concerning the future of the Jews expelled from Romania. This gave the local forces great leeway in making decisions.

On February 17, 1942, Romania's military dictator Ion Antonescu wrote a resolution on the evacuation of some Jews from various areas of the Old Kingdom and southern Transylvania (Bucharest, the oil-producing area, Constanta and Giurgiu) and possibly Chernivtsi to Transnistria for Communist activities and other perceived offenses which said, among other things "One must not proceed with savagery.... I declared through the declarations that I have made the life and liberty of the autochtonous Jews. I must keep my word." The German authorities, and especially the RSHA, started to push Romania to deport Jews to the German death camps in occupied Poland after it had become clear that the era of Jewish mass deaths in Transnistria was over, by late July 1942. In the article "Romania Cleansed of Jews", the newspaper of the German Legation in Bukarest, Bukarester Tageblatt, no. 4700 of August 8, 1942, the Jews of Romania, including those of Transnistria, were supposed to be deported to the area of German control in the fall of 1943, which did not happen. Jean Ancel wrote that the Jews from Transnistria who were repatriated from Transnistria in late 1943 and early 1944 were those from Dorohoi and the rest of the Old Kingdom as well as the orphans. While this was broadly true, there were exceptions to this rule; for example, in May and June 1942, seven Jews from the ghettos of Mogilev and Djurin were allowed to return to Bucharest, Vatra Dornei and Radauti, and 48 others were allowed to return from various ghettos in Transnistria. In 1943–1944, 10,744 Jews deported to Transnistria, including 1,846 orphaned children, were repatriated under the Antonescu regime, about a fifth of those who had survived by the fall of 1943. On March 14, 1944, Ion Antonescu allowed the repatriation of all the Jews deported to Transnistria. According to Jean Ancel, "One could say that between ,October 1942 and 23 August 1944 the Antonescu regime defended Romanian Jewry against Nazi extermination ambitions.

The Hungarian authorities proposed to the Germans twice, in January and July 1942, the deportation to Transnistria of 100,000 Jews who were alleged to have entered Hungary illegally and to have resided in northeastern Hungary (Transcarpathia and Northern Transylvania); Adolf Eichmann, the SS official in charge of the deportations of Jews to the Nazi death camps, rejected the offer.as 'a mere "partial action"' (partial genocide). By contrast, the deportation of the 11,294 Jews of Macedonia and western Thrace under Bulgarian control was accepted because they were deported to the Nazi death camp of Treblinka. On October 7, 1942, the German minister to Romania, Manfred von Killinger, argued that the deportations of Jews from the Old Kingdom and southern Transylvania mentioned earlier, which angered him, were a way to "sabotage the solution to the Jewish problem in Romania".

=== After the Holocaust ===
Radu Ioanid mentioned a Romanian government report that indicated that 22,300 Jewish deportees had returned to Romania in the fall of 1944, after Romania had switched sides against Germany, but when the Communists did not yet control the country; he believes that this number is an exaggeration. Another large group were repatriated starting in April 1945.

According to Nikolai Bougai, in March 1945, 12,852 Jews from 5,420 families with both Romanian and Soviet passports living in Ukraine were relocated (as Jews) by the NKVD to the Soviet north and east. Those Jews who survived the forced labor in the Soviet camps who had been sent there from Mohyliv-Podilskyi returned to Romania in 1947. According to the Yad Vashem data, 232 Jews sent there whose names are known died in the Arkhangelsk basin. According to the Yad Vashem data, five Jews from Romania died there. According to the Yad Vashem data, 200 Jews originally from Romania whose names are known died in Siberia, while 448 Jews originally from Romania whose names are known died in Uzbekistan. Moreover, 134 Jews Jews originally from Romania whose names are known died in Kazakhstan, while 28 died in Turkmenistan. etc.; the total number of dead Jews deported in 1941 whose names were known was 810. According to Dr. Avigdor Schachan, who wrote a book about the Transnistrian ghettos, and was himself brought up in the Bessarabian part of the present-day Chernivtsi Oblast of Ukraine, about 2,000 northern Bukovinian and 4,000 Bessarabian Jews were deported to the Soviet east in June 1941. This would mean that at least 13.5% of the Jews deported in 1941 died in the Soviet east. About half of the Jews deported from Bessarabia to the Soviet east survived and returned to Bessarabia, and the rest did not return, according to a source mentioned by Jean Ancel (Matathias Carp), the specialist on the Holocaust in Romania and Transnistria; however, Carp's estimate is not confirmed by other sources. According to some sources, most of the deportees of June 1941 from the Chernivtsi oblast, who were of many ethnicities, did not return from the Soviet east. However, the fragmentary, locality-by-locality, evidence indicates that most of the deportees from 1941 survived.

== See also ==
- History of the Jews in Bessarabia
- History of the Jews in Moldova
- History of the Jews in Bukovina
- Shargorod
- History of the Jews in Odesa
- Mohyliv-Podilskyi
- Tulchyn
- Vapniarka concentration camp
- Bogdanovka concentration camp
- Domanivka
- Pechora concentration camp
