= Ostrytsia =

Commune in Chernivtsi Oblast, Ukraine

Ostrytsia Остриця Острица Ostrița
- Village
- Interactive map of Ostrytsia
- Location of Ostrytsia Ostrytsia (Ukraine)
- Coordinates: 48°15′30.96″N 26°2′30.84″E
- Country: Ukraine
- Oblast: Chernivtsi Oblast
- Raion: Chernivtsi Raion
- Hromada: Ostrytsia rural hromada
- Elevation: 196 m (643 ft)

Population (2001)
  - Total: 3,686
- Time zone: UTC+2 (EET)
  - Summer (DST): UTC+3 (EEST)
- Postal code: 60520
- Area code: +380 3740
- KOATUU: 7320784001

Ostrytsia (Ukrainian: Остриця; Romanian: Ostrița; German: Ostritza: Bukovinian (dialect of ukrainian): Острица) is a village in Chernivtsi Raion, Chernivtsi Oblast, Ukraine. It hosts the administration of Ostrytsia rural hromada, one of the hromadas of Ukraine,

Until 18 July 2020, Ostrytsia belonged to Hertsa Raion, which was historically a part of the province of Moldavia, although the town of Ostrytsia itself lies in Bukovina (Austro-Hungarian until 1918). The raion was abolished in July 2020 as part of the administrative reform of Ukraine, which reduced the number of raions of Chernivtsi Oblast to three. The area of Hertsa Raion was merged into Chernivtsi Raion. In 2001, 93.73% of the 3,686 inhabitants spoke Romanian (3,455 people) as their native language (93.22% self-declared it Romanian, or 3,436, and 0.52% self-declared it Moldovan, or 19), while 4.96%, or 183 people, spoke Ukrainian. In the Soviet census of 1989, the number of inhabitants who declared themselves Romanians plus Moldovans was 2,965 (324, or 10.05% Romanians plus 2,641 or 81.92% Moldovan) out of 3,224, representing 91.97% of the locality's population, and there were 205 ethnic Ukrainians (6.36%). A large majority of the population switched their declared census identities from Moldovan and Moldovan-speaking to Romanian and Romanian-speaking between the 1989 and 2001 censuses, and the process has continued ever since.

In 2001, in the Ostrytsia rural hromada (rural community) created in 2020, with a population of 13,868, 960 of the inhabitants (6.92%) spoke Ukrainian as their native language, while 12,796 (92.27%) spoke Romanian (out of which 12,428 or 89.62% called the language Romanian and 371 or 2.68% called the language Moldovan), and 89 (0.64%) spoke Russian.

== Notable people ==
- Ștefan Chițac (1933–2011), Soviet general, statesman and Transnistrian military leader
