= Tsuren =

Village in Chernivtsi Oblast, Ukraine

Coordinates: 48.2364°N 26.1008°E

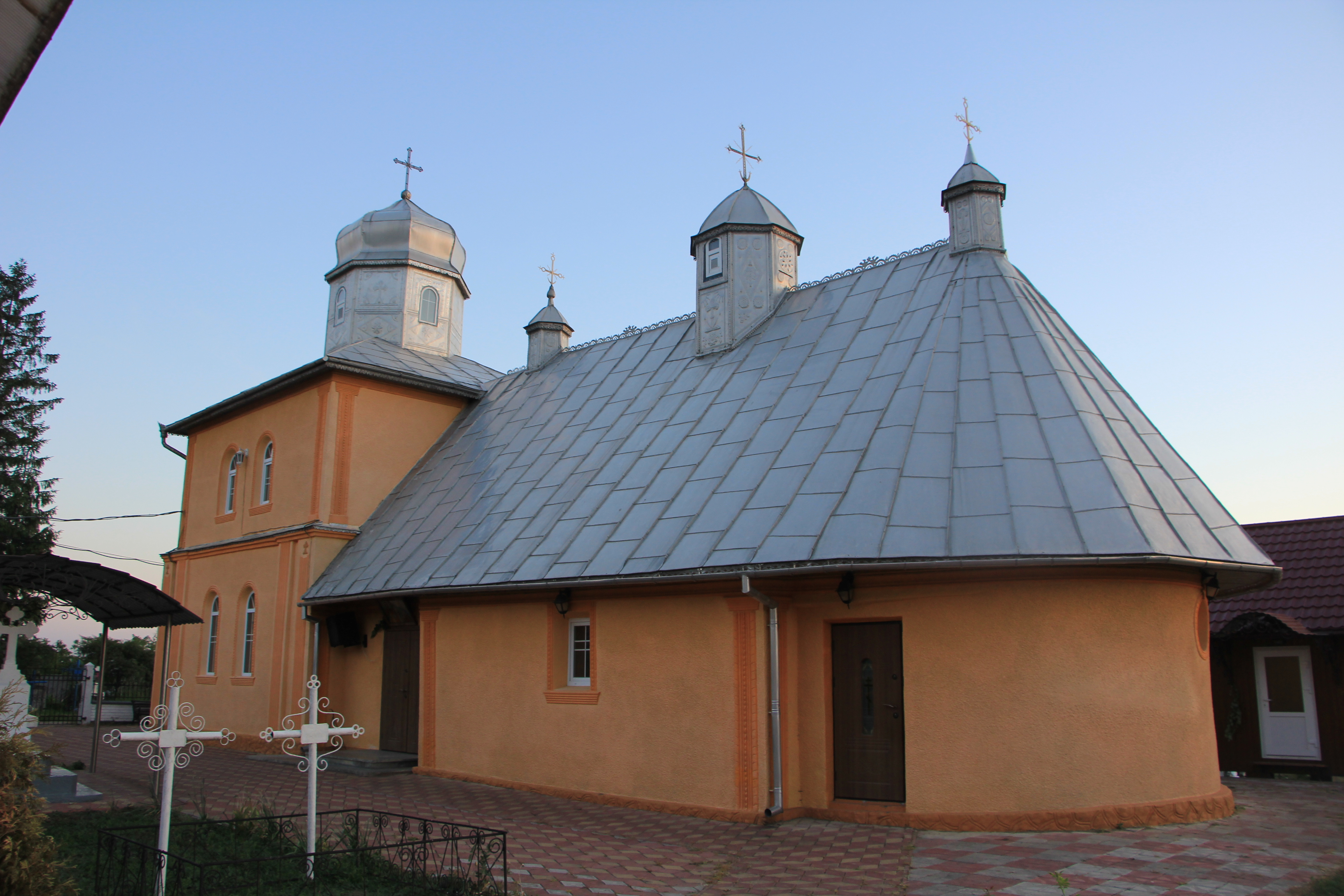
Wooden church of Archangels Michael and Gabriel

Tsuren (Ukrainian: Цурень; Romanian: Țureni; German: Zurin) is a village in Chernivtsi Raion, Chernivtsi Oblast, Ukraine. It belongs to Ostrytsia rural hromada, one of the hromadas of Ukraine,

Until 18 July 2020, Tsuren, which was historically a part of the province of Bukovina, belonged to Hertsa Raion. The raion was abolished in July 2020 as part of the administrative reform of Ukraine, which reduced the number of raions of Chernivtsi Oblast to three. The area of Hertsa Raion was merged into Chernivtsi Raion. In 2001, 893, or 94.4% of the 946 inhabitants of the village of Tsuren spoke Romanian as their native language (630 self-declared it Romanian or 66.6%, and 263 declared it Moldovan, or 27.8%), with a minority of 50 Ukrainian speakers (5.29%). In the 1989 census, the number of residents who declared themselves Romanian plus Moldovan was 865, representing 96.11% of the locality's population out of 900, including 108 self-identified Romanians (12%) and 757 self-identified Moldovans (84.11%), and there were 31 ethnic Ukrainians (3.44%). A large majority of the population switched their declared census identities from Moldovan and Moldovan-speaking to Romanian and Romanian-speaking between the 1989 and 2001 censuses, and the process has continued ever since. The reason why the "Moldovan" identity was dominant during the Soviet period, but was replaced by the "Romanian" one after 1989, including in Tsuren, was that the inhabitants of the Chernivtsi and Sadagura rural raions, and of the Bukovinian part of the Novoselytsia rural raion, were pressured in 1944 to adopt a "Moldovan" national/ethnic identity.

In the same commune, there is also the mostly Ukrainian village of Mamornitsya, which was also historically a part of the province of Bukovina. In 2001, its population of 494 included 450 Ukrainian-speakers (91.09%), and 41 Romanian-speakers (8.3%, including 20 self-identified Romanian-speakers, or 4.05%, and 21 self-identified Moldovan-speakers, or 4.25%), and 2 Russian-speakers (or 0.4%). In 1989, there were 9 self-identified Romanians (1.86%) and 26 were self-identified Moldovans (5.38%) out of 483 people. A significant proportion of the Moldovan plus Romanian population switched their declared census identities from Moldovan and Moldovan-speaking to Romanian and Romanian-speaking between the 1989 and 2001 censuses, and the process has continued ever since.

== Natives ==
- Gheorghe Sion (1822–1892), Moldavian, later Romanian poet, playwright, translator, and memoirist
