= Hertsa region =

Ukrainian region composed of the Hertsa town and its surroundings

Hertsa region Край Герца (Ukrainian) Ținutul Herța (Romanian)
- Historical region of Romania
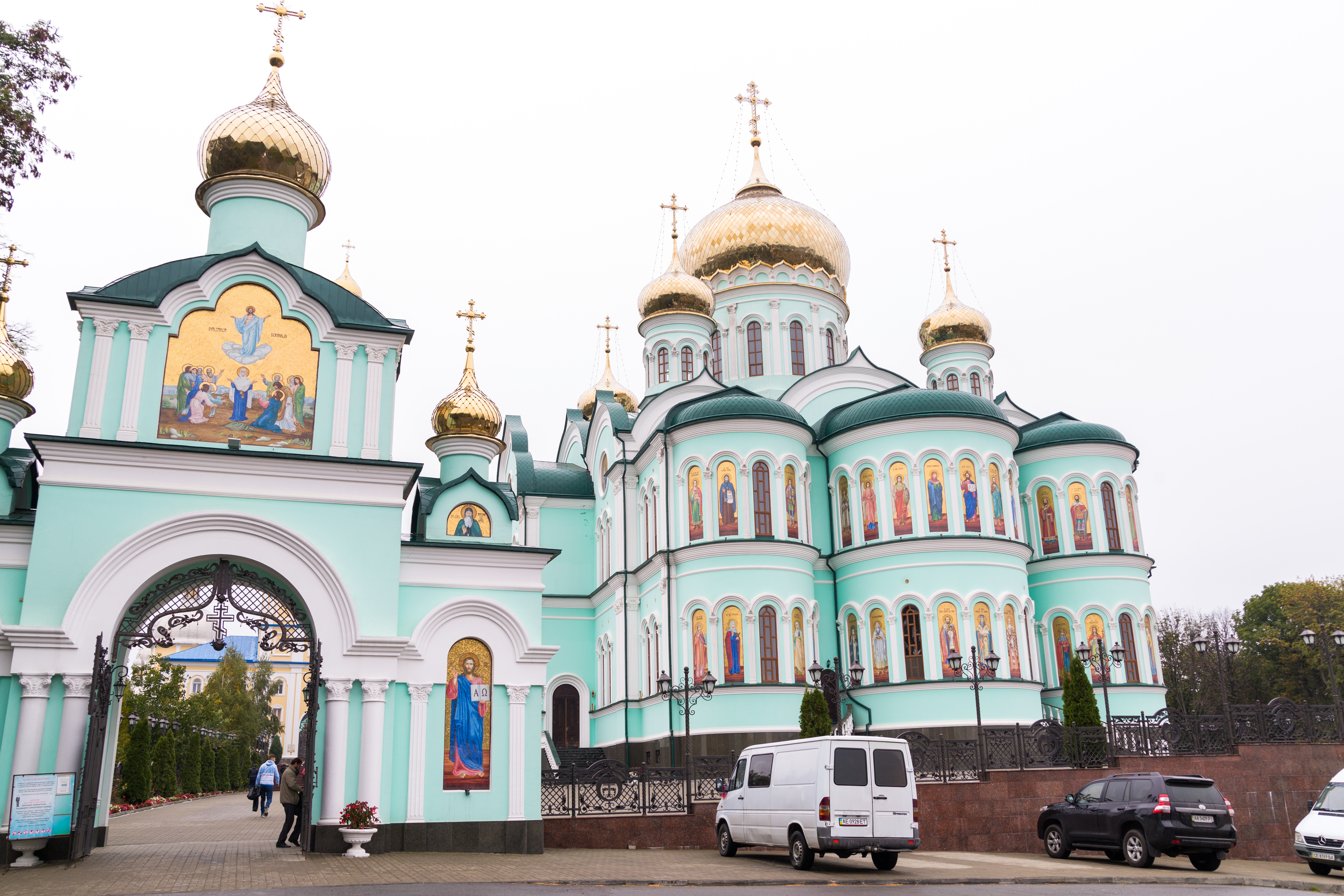
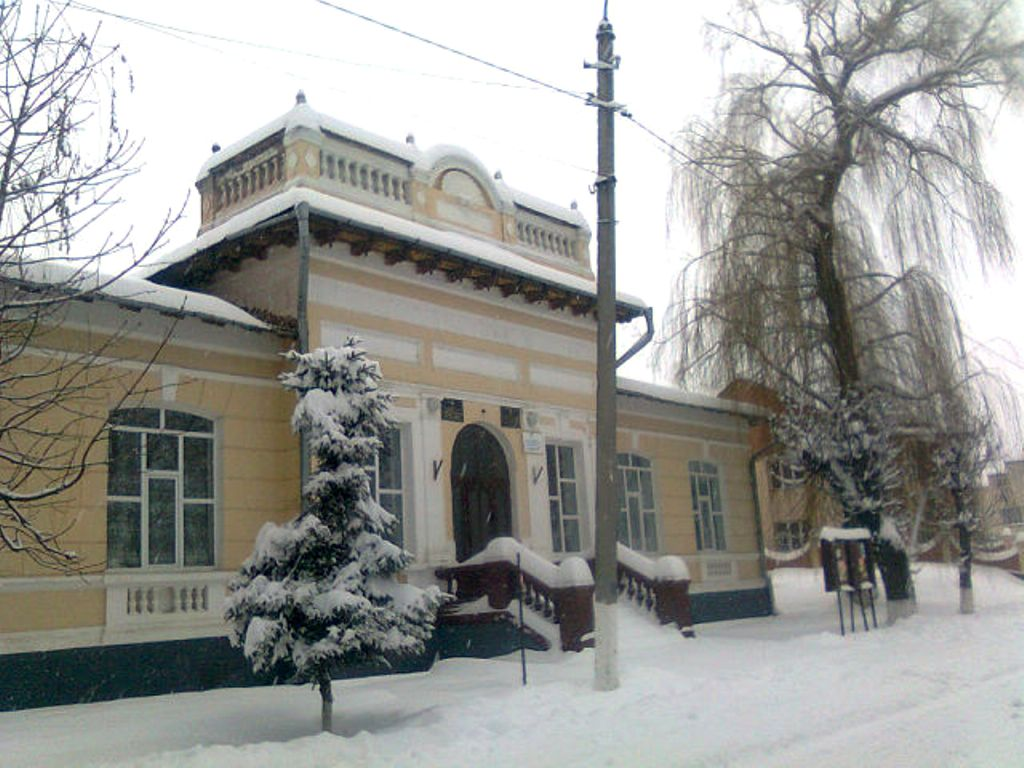
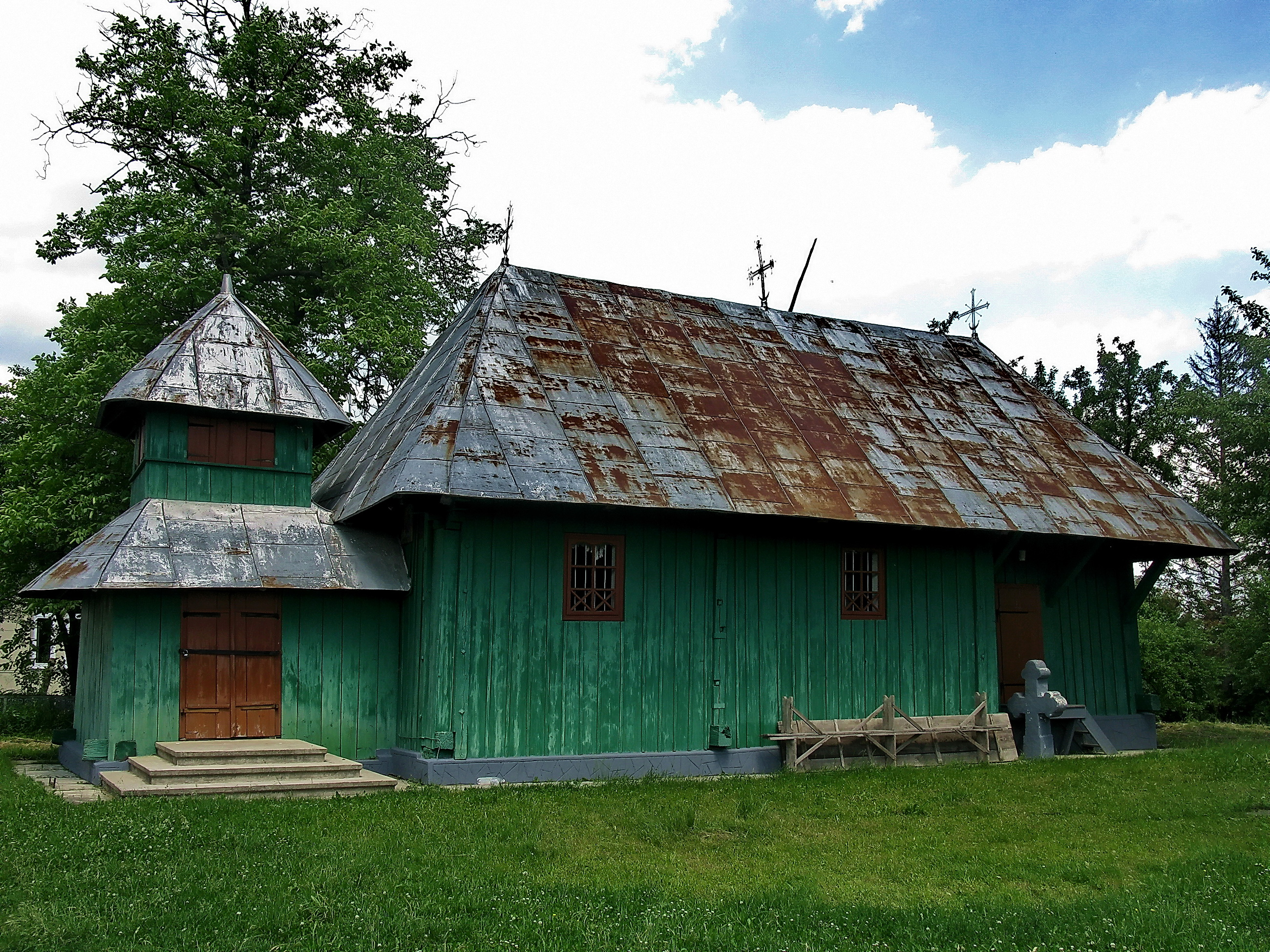
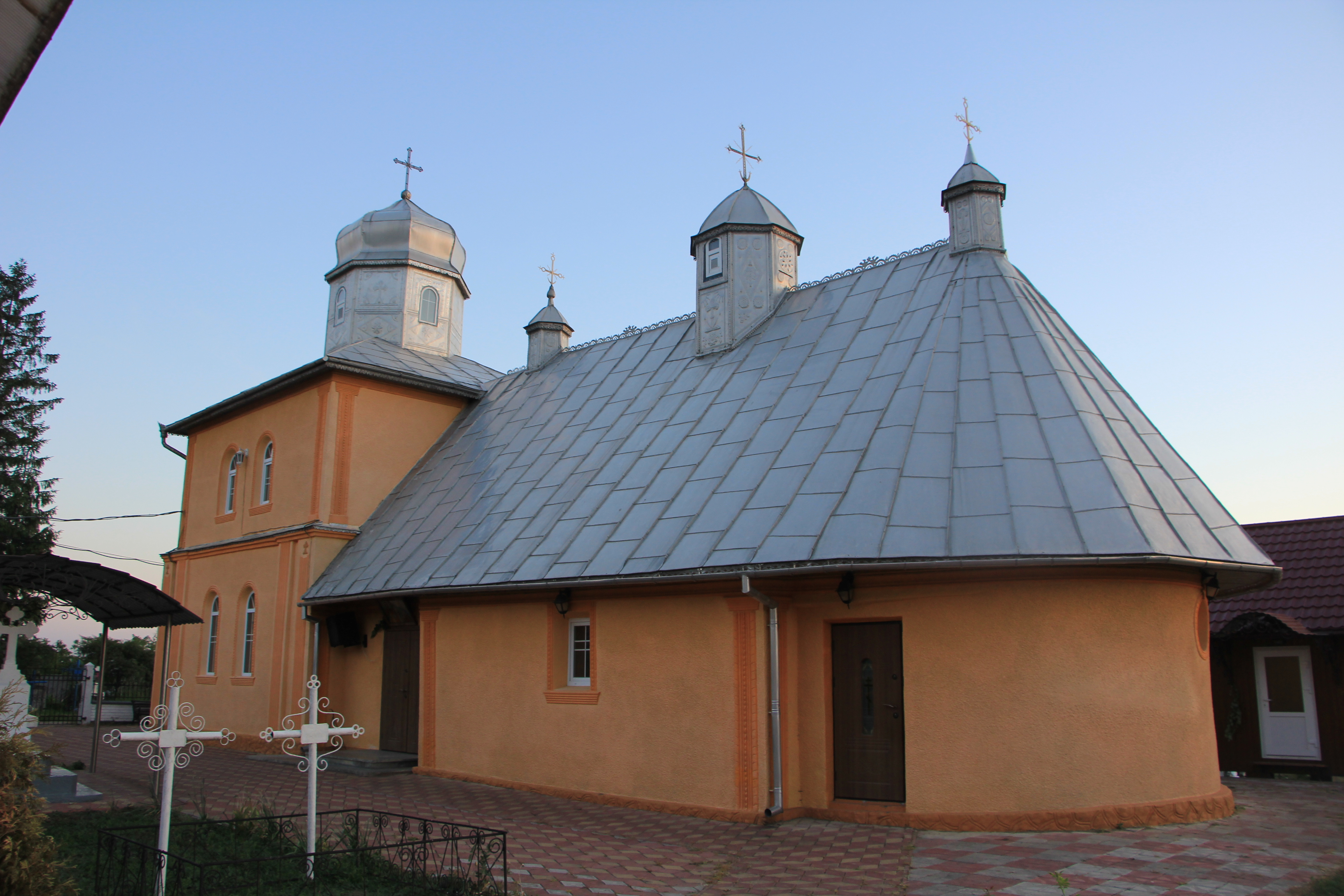
- From top, left to right: Banchensky Monastery; Former synagogue, now Palace of Culture in Hertsa; Saint Demeter wooden Church in Bukivka; Church of Archangels Michael and Gabriel in Tsuren

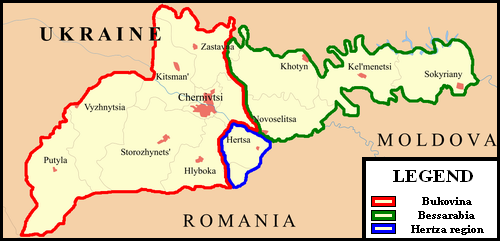
- Map of modern Chernivtsi Oblast with historical regions outlined: red: northern Bukovina, blue: Hertsa region, green: northern Bessarabia
- Country: Ukraine
- Largest city: Hertsa
- Time zone: UTC+2 (EET)
  - Summer (DST): UTC+3 (EEST)

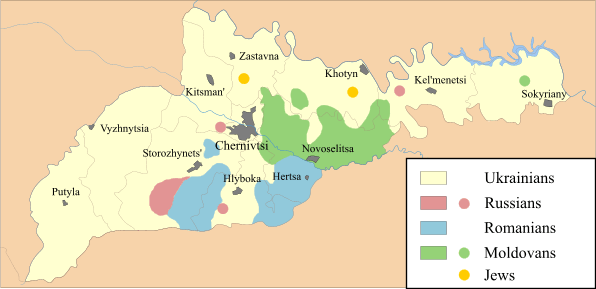
Ethnic divisions in Chernivtsi Oblast in the 1980s, with Ukrainians, Romanians, Russians, Moldovans and Jews depicted in white, blue, red, green, and yellow respectively

The Hertsa region, also known as the Hertza region (Ukrainian: Край Герца, romanized: Krai Hertsa; Romanian: Ținutul Herța), is a region around the town of Hertsa within Chernivtsi Raion in the southern part of Chernivtsi Oblast in southwestern Ukraine, near the border with Romania. With an area of around 304 km^{2} (117 sq mi), it has a population of about 32,300 people (as of 2001), 93% of whom are ethnic Romanians.

== History ==
The territory, historically part of Moldavia, was one of the five districts of Dorohoi County. Following the Molotov–Ribbentrop Pact of August 23, 1939, the Soviet Union issued on June 26, 1940, an ultimatum to Romania that threatened the use of force. The Romanian government, responding to the Soviet ultimatum, agreed to withdraw from the territories to avoid a military conflict. A few days later, Bessarabia and Northern Bukovina were occupied by the Soviet Union, and the Hertsa region was attached to the Ukrainian Soviet Socialist Republic. As it was not mentioned in the ultimatum, the annexation of the Hertsa region was not consented to by Romania. The region (together with the rest of Bessarabia and Bukovina) was recaptured by Romania during 1941–1944 in the course of the Axis attack on the Soviet Union in World War II, until the Red Army captured it again in 1944. Soviet annexation of this territory was internationally recognized by the Paris Peace Treaties in 1947.

The number of deportees to the Soviet north and east from the Hertsa raion in its boundaries from earliy 2020 of the Chernivtsi oblast on June 13, 1941, was 1,373; 219 (15.95%) of them would later die in Siberia and Kazakhstan. Among the 1,373 deportees from Hertsa Raion, 120 were of unknown nationality; among the 1,253 people whose nationality was known, 1090 (86.99%) were ethnic Romanians, 125 were ethnic Jews (9.98%), 31 were ethnic Ukrainians (2.474%), 4 were ethnic Russians (0.32%), 2 were ethnic Germans (0.02%) and 1 was ethnically Polish (0.08%).

Almost all the Jews who lived in the town of Hertsa (1,204) and in the rest of the Hertsa area (14), which were under Soviet rule in 1940-1941 and in 1944-1991, on September 1, 1941, were deported to Transnistria by the Romanian authorities, where most of them died; only 450 were alive in December 1943 (according to Andrei Corbea-Hoisie), when the repatriation of the Jews to Dorohoi County, including these people, by the Romanian authorities started, while about 800 Jews died. However, the number of about 1,200 Jews were not individuals counted in the town; on August 11, 1941, there were 1,200 Jews from Herta in the concentration camp in Secureni in Northern Bessarabia. The Romanian army and authorities killed about 100 Jews on July 5, 1941, before the deportation to Transnistria. The Yad Vashem database lists the names of 102 Jews from Hertsa who were killed in Hertsa. Moreover, 483 Jews from Hertsa and the neighboring villages died in Ukraine, including Transnistria, because of the deportations according to the Yad Vashem website. For the entire Dorohoi County ("Judet"), a large majority of which remained in Romania, 6,425 Jews survived the deportations to Transnistria, while 5,131 died between September 6, 1940, and August 23, 1944, during the Antonescu dictatorship, overwhelmingly due to the deportations of 1941 and 1942.

The Yad Vashem database lists the identities of 843 Jews from Herta who died during World War II. It lists the identities of five Jews from Herta who were killed by the Soviet authorities in Siberia, and of 461 who died in Ukraine, including Transnistria, because of the deportations. For more information on the Holocaust in Transnistria, including on the fate of the Jewish deportees from Romania, see History of the Jews in Transnistria. According to the newest data, out of 1,650 Jews of the town of Hertsa who were deported to Transnistria (which excludes those who were executed before that), about 800 died in Transnistria.

Romania and Ukraine have signed and ratified a border agreement and are signatories of international treaties and alliances that denounce any territorial claims. Romanian organisations in the region consider Hertsa to be historically Romanian, detached from it by the Soviet Union in 1940 in violation of international law. The correspondent of "New Region", Sergei Vulpe, with reference to the Bucharest newspaper Ziua reported on April 17, 2008 that the President of Romania, Traian Băsescu, stated that if Ukraine wants to annex Transnistria, then they should return Southern Bessarabia (Budjak) and northern Bukovina (Chernivtsi Oblast that includes the Hertsa region) to Moldova.

=== Hertsa Raion - Demographics ===
In 2001, the population of Hertsa Raion was 32,316, of which 29,554 or 91.45% identified themselves as Romanians, 1,616 or 5.0% as Ukrainians, and 756 or 2.34% as Moldovans (out of which 511 self-identified their language as Moldovan and 237 as Romanian), 0.9% as Russians, and 0.3% as being of other ethnicities (see: Ukrainian Census, 2001). Hertsa raion, within its boundaries at that time, had 32,316 inhabitants in 2001, including 4.83% Ukrainian-speakers, 93.82% Romanian-speakers, and 1.21% Russian-speakers. In the last Soviet census of 1989, out of 29,611 inhabitants, 1,569 declared themselves Ukrainians (5.30%), 23,539 Romanians (79.49%), 3,978 Moldovans (13.43%), and 431 Russians (1.46%). The decline in the number (from 3,978 to 756) and proportion of Moldovans (from 13.43% to 2.34%) was explained by a switch from a census Moldovan to a census Romanian ethnic identity, and has continued after the 2001 census. By contrast, the number of self-identified ethnic Romanians has increased (from 23,539 to 29,554), and so has their proportion of the population of the former raion (from 79.49% to 91.45%), and the process has continued after the 2001 census. Some authors have argued that most of the inhabitants of the former Hertsa Raion who had self-identified themselves as Moldovans in 1989 self-identified themselves as Romanians in 2001. Since the Hertsa raion split from the Hlyboka raion after the 1989 Soviet census, we do not have the breakdown of the inhabitants of Hertsa raion by native language in 1989. In 2001, this was Ukraine's only raion in which an absolute majority of the population was recorded by the census as having a Romanian identity, and the raion in Ukraine with the largest proportion of Romanian-speakers.

According to the 2001 census, in the Hertsa urban hromada (urban community) created in 2020, with a population of 17,519, 572 of the inhabitants (3.27%) spoke Ukrainian as their native language, while 16,627 (94.91%) spoke Romanian, including 16,485 who called their language Romanian (94.1%) and 142 who called it Moldovan (0.81%) and 298 (1.7%) spoke Russian. In 2001, in the Ostrytsia rural hromada (rural community) created in 2020, with a population of 13,868, 960 of the inhabitants (6.92%) spoke Ukrainian as their native language, while 12,796 (92.27%) spoke Romanian (out of which 12,428 or 89.62% called the language Romanian and 371 or 2.68% called the language Moldovan), and 89 (0.64%) spoke Russian.

The raion included only three localities in which there were more self-identified Moldovans than Romanians in 1989, all of them historically a part of Bukovina; in two, the population identified its language overwhelmingly as Romanian in 2001 (see below). In the village of Ostrytsia in the Hertsa Raion, in 2001, 93.73% of the inhabitants spoke Romanian as their native language (93.22% self-declared Romanian and 0.52% self-declared Moldovan), while 4.96% spoke Ukrainian. In the Soviet census of 1989, the number of inhabitants of the locality who declared themselves Romanians plus Moldovans was 2,965 (324, or 10.05% Romanians plus 2,641 or 81.92% Moldovans) out of 3,224, representing 91.97% of the locality's population, and there were 205 ethnic Ukrainians (6.36%). In 2001, 893, or 94.4% of the 946 inhabitants of the village of Tsuren of the Hertsa Raion spoke Romanian as their native language (630 self-declared it Romanian or 66.6%, and 263 declared in Moldovan, or 27.8%), with a minority of 50 Ukrainian speakers (5.29%). In the 1989 census, the number of residents who declared themselves Romanian plus Moldovan was 865, representing 96.11% of the locality's population out of 900, including 108 self-identified Romanians (12%) and 757 self-identified Moldovans (84.11%), and there were 31 ethnic Ukrainians (3.44%).

Another locality where a significant amount of identity change from Moldovan and Moldovan-speaking to Romanian and Romanian-speaking was Mamornytsia (see Mamornytsia (in Ukrainian) and Mamornița (in Romanian)).

The number of self-declared ethnic Romanians plus Moldovans in the raion (30,310, or 93.79%) was slightly lower than the number of Romanian-speakers (30,337, or 93.88%); 99.65% of the Romanians plus Moldovans used Romanian as their native language, a figure comparable to that of the Romanian ethnic population in Transcarpathia. The number of ethnic Ukrainians in the raion increased from 1,569 to 1,616, but their percentage of the population decreased from 5.3% to 5%. The number of ethnic Ukrainians due to natural increase and because of the identity change of a number of previously self-identified ethnic Romanians or Russians to ethnic Ukrainians from among those who had attended Ukrainian schools. While 51 Romanians and 6 Moldovans declared that their native language was Ukrainian, 89 Ukrainians were speaking Romanian as their mother tongue in 2001.

In 2003/2004, the raion had 10 Romanian middle schools, 7 incomplete middle schools and 11 elementary schools in Romanian, with 315 classes and 5,446 students, and a Ukrainian middle school and a Ukrainian elementary school, with 15 classes and 259 students.

The city of Hertsa has a Romanian-language newspaper, Gazeta de Herța.

== See also ==
- Hertsa raion
- Dorohoi County
- Moldova
- Moldavia
- Bessarabia
- Bukovina
- Transnistria
- Budjak
- Romanians in Ukraine
- History of the Jews in Transnistria
- History of the Jews in Bukovina
