= Dorohoi County =

Județul Dorohoi
- County (Județ)
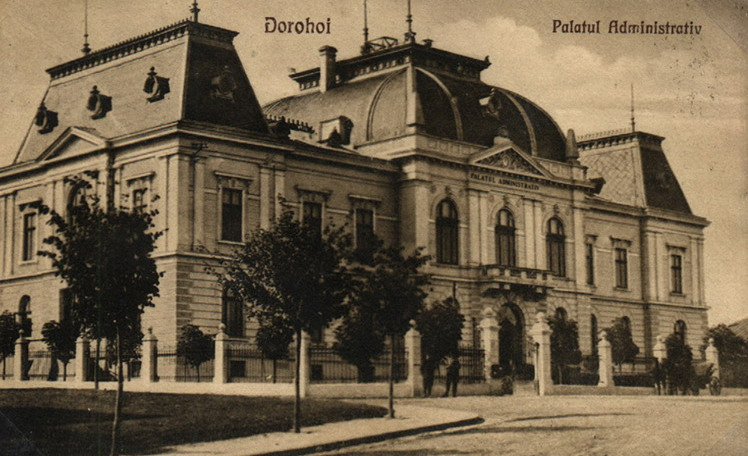
- The Dorohoi County Prefecture building of the interwar period.

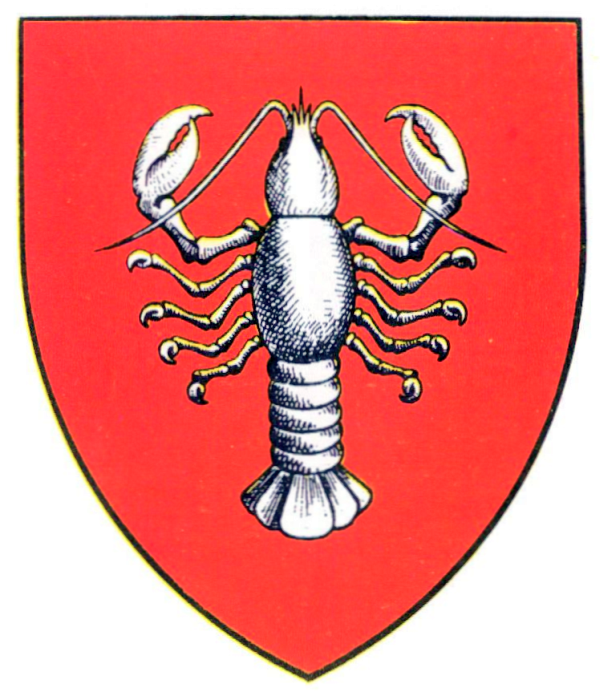
- Coat of arms

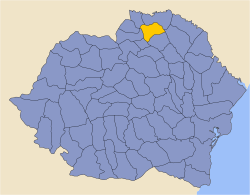
- Country: Romania
- Historic region: Moldavia
- County seat (Reședință de județ): Dorohoi
- Established: 1859
- Ceased to exist: Administrative reform of 1950

Area
  - Total: 2,846 km^{2} (1,099 sq mi)

Population (1930)
  - Total: 211,354
  - Density: 74.26/km^{2} (192.3/sq mi)
- Time zone: UTC+2 (EET)
  - Summer (DST): UTC+3 (EEST)

Dorohoi County, with its seat at Dorohoi, was a subdivision of the Kingdom of Romania and located in the region of Moldavia.

== Geography ==
The county was located in the northeastern part of Greater Romania, in the north-eastern extremity of the Moldavia region. Today the territory of the former county is split between Romania (north Botoșani County, with an area of 2,542 km^{2}) and Ukraine (Hertsa region, with an area of 304 km^{2}). It bordered northwest with Cernăuți County, to the north and east with Hotin County, south Botoşani County, southwest with Suceava County, and west with Rădăuți County.

== Administrative organization ==
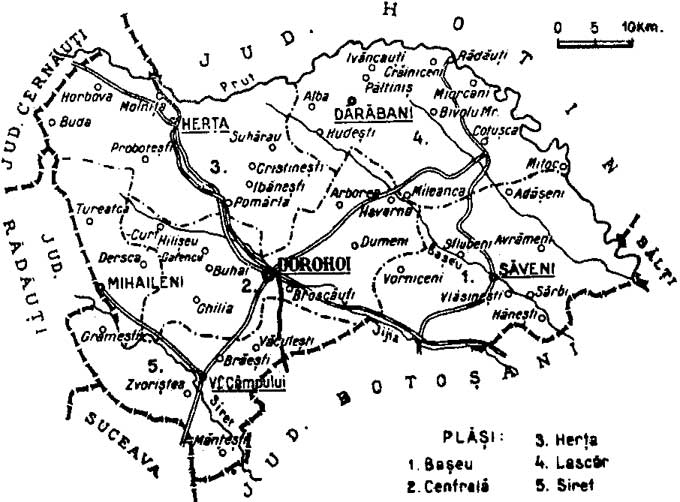
Map of the county, with the district arrangement in 1938.

The county comprised five cities: Dorohoi, Darabani, Herța, Mihăileni and Săveni.

Administratively, Dorohoi County was originally divided into three districts (plăși):

1. Plasa Bașeu
2. Plasa Herța
3. Plasa Siret

Subsequently, two new districts were established:

4. Plasa Centrală
5. Plasa Lascăr

From 1941 to 1944, Dorohoi County was part of the Bukovina Governorate.

=== Population ===
According to the 1930 census data, the county population was 211,354 inhabitants, of which 92.1% were ethnic Romanians, 7.0% were ethnic Jews, as well as other minorities. From the religious point of view, 92.4% were Eastern Orthodox, 7.0% Jewish, 0.3% Roman Catholic, as well as other minorities.

==== Urban population ====
In 1930, the county's urban population was 43,707 inhabitants, 69.3% Romanians, 29.1% Jews, 0.6% Germans, as well as other minorities. In the urban area, languages were Romanian (71.1%), Yiddish (27.4%), German (0.6%), as well as other minorities. From the religious point of view, the urban population was composed of Eastern Orthodox (69.1%), Jewish (29.3%), Roman Catholic (0.9%), as well as other minorities.

==== Jewish Population, the Holocaust, and the Soviet Deportations of 1941 from the Hertsa region ====
The number of deportees to the Soviet north and east from the present-day Hertsa raion on June 13, 1941, was 1996; according to some sources, most of the deportees died.

In 1941-1944, Dorohoi County, historically a part of the Old Kingdom of Romania, was officially/administratively a part of Bukovina. Almost all the Jews who lived in the town of Hertsa (1,204) and in the rest of the Hertsa area (14), which were under Soviet rule in 1940-1941 and in 1944-1991, on September 1, 1941, were deported to Transnistria by the Romanian authorities, where most of them died; only 450 were alive in December 1943 (according to Andrei Corbea-Hoisie), when the repatriation of the Jews to Dorohoi County, including of those originating in the Hertsa area, by the Romanian authorities started, while about 800 Jews died. However, the number of about 1,200 Jews were not individuals counted in the town; on August 11, 1941, there were 1,200 Jews from Herta in the concentration camp in Secureni in Northern Bessarabia. The Romanian army and authorities killed 100 Jews on July 5, 1941, before the deportation to Transnistria. For the entire Dorohoi County ("Judet"), a large majority of which remained in Romania, 6,425 Jews survived the deportations to Transnistria, while 5,131 died between September 6, 1940, and August 23, 1944, during the Antonescu dictatorship, overwhelmingly due to the deportations of 1941 and 1942. After the November 1941 deportations of Jews from Dorohoi County (9,367 Jews) and June 1942 (360 Jews), excluding the Jews from the Herta area that had been under Soviet occupation, 2,316 Jews were not deported. There is a list of about 3,000 Jews deported from Dorohoi. In November 1943, according to General Constantin Vasiliu, undersecretary of state for police and security in the Ministry of the Interior, if one includes the Jews deported from Dorohoi in 1942, but excluding the Hertsa area, 10,368 Jews were deported from the county, while if one includes the Jews of Hertsa, about 12,000 or more were deported. At the end of 1943, 6,053 Jews deported from Dorohoi County (excluding a large majority of the Jews from the Hertsa area) were returned by the Romanian authorities to the county. According to the newest data, out of 1,650 Jews of the town of Hertsa who were deported to Transnistria (which excludes those who were executed before that), about 800 died in Transnistria.

Jean Ancel has shown that the decision to deport the Jews of Dorohoi county in 1941 "originated form local government officials, such as members of the military, civil servants and lawyers". It was authorized by Governor Calotescu of Bukovina. When Romania's military dictator Ion Antonescu (who had ordered the 1941 deportations of the Bessarabian and Bukovinian Jews to Transnistria) was informed of the deportations, and an intervention by Jewish leader Wilhelm Filderman and a National Peasant Party politician, Nicolae Lupu [see the Romanian language article on him at https://ro.wikipedia.org/wiki/Nicolae_Lupu_(politician)], he ordered that the Jews who were about to board the train not be deported to Transnistria. The 1942 deportations of Jews from Dorohoi County seem not to have been ordered by Ion Antonescu, who nevertheless ordered the deportations of Chernivtsi and Chisinau Jews in that year. In the book by the great late Holocaust scholar Raul Hilberg, the dean of Holocaust studies, cites Antonescu's statement in the meeting of the Council of Ministers of November 17, 1943; Antonescu stated in reference to the Jews of Dorohoi County, "Those from Old Roumania, who have been removed by mistake, will be brought back to their homes." For more information on the Holocaust in Transnistria, including on the fate of the Jewish deportees from Romania, including Dorohoi County, see History of the Jews in Transnistria.

== See also ==
- Hertsa region
- Hertsa
- Hertsa Raion
