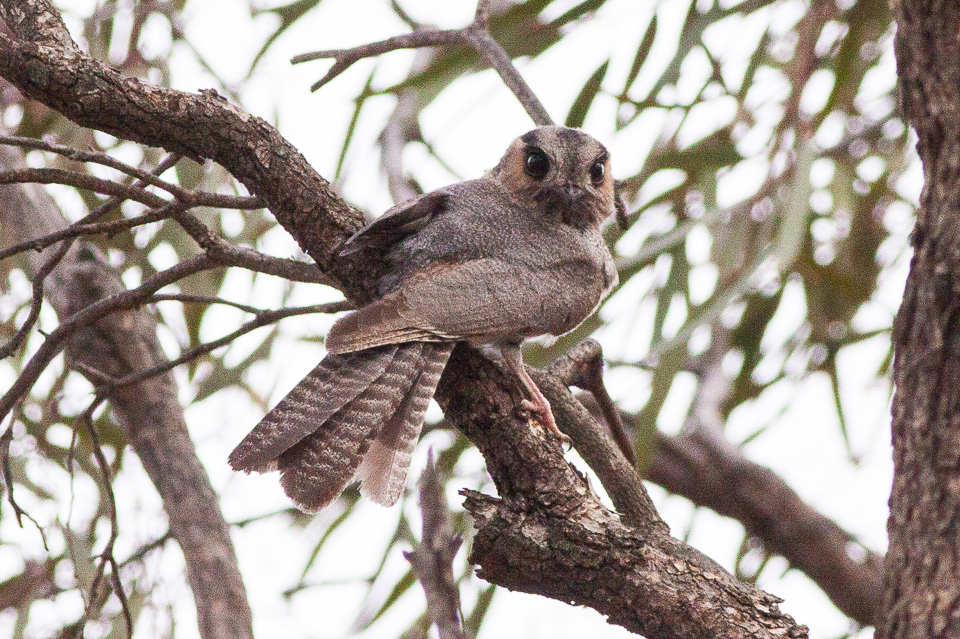
- Australian owlet-nightjar, Aegotheles cristatus
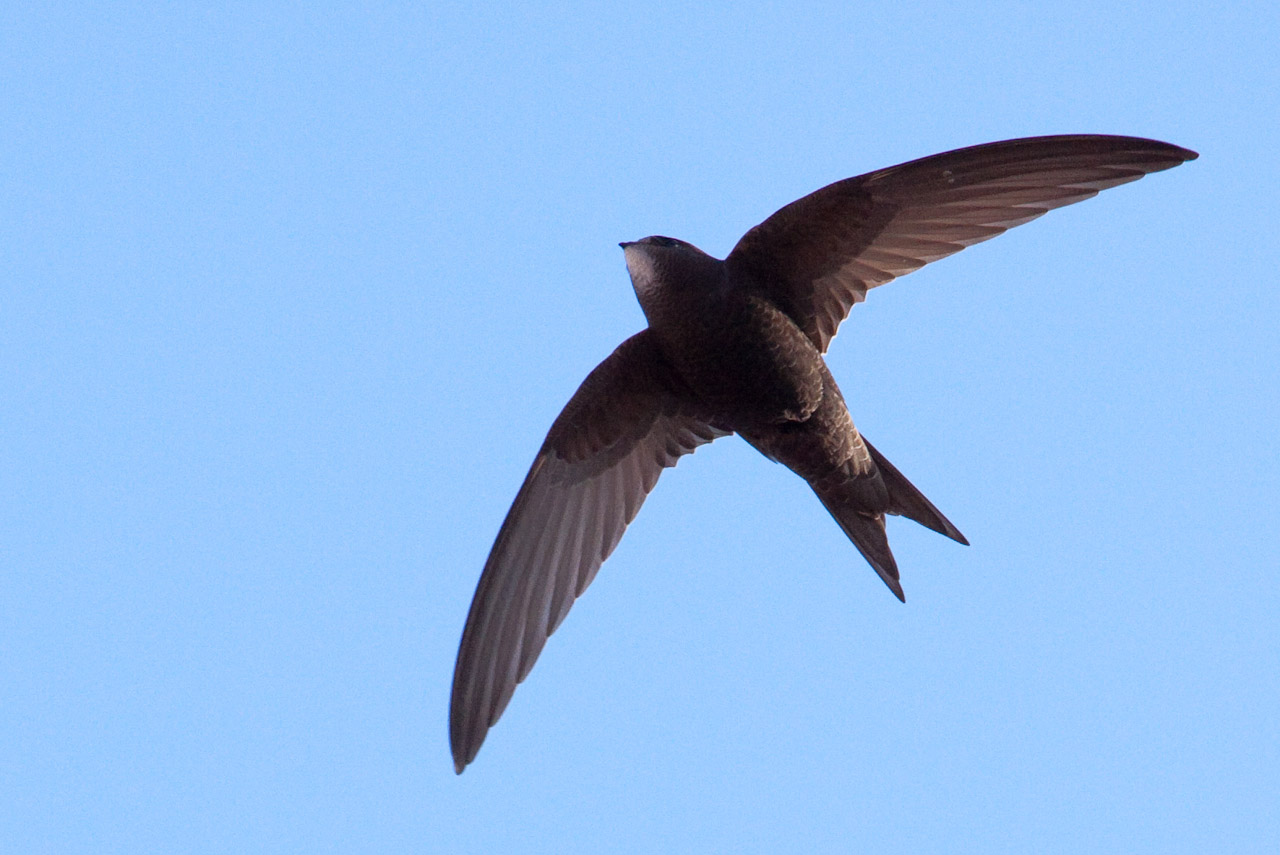
- Common swift, Apus apus

Scientific classification
- Kingdom: Animalia
- Phylum: Chordata
- Class: Aves
- Clade: Vanescaves
- Clade: Apodimorphae; Sibley et al., 1988

Subtaxa
- †Archaeotrogonidae; †Eocypselidae; Daedalornithes Sangster, 2005; Aegotheliformes; †Quipollornis; Aegothelidae; Apodiformes; †Aegialornithidae; Trochiloidea; †Cypselavidae; †Jungornithidae; †Eurotrochilus; Trochilidae; Apodi; Hemiprocnidae; †Procypseloides; †Laputavis; †Scaniacypselus; Apodidae

= Apodimorphae =

Apodimorphae Temporal range: Paleocene - Holocene, 60–0 Ma

Clade of birds

Apodimorphae is a clade of strisorean birds that include the extant families Trochilidae (hummingbirds), Hemiprocnidae (treeswifts), Apodidae (swifts), Aegothelidae (owlet-nightjars), and many fossil families. This grouping of birds has been supported in a variety of recent studies. There are two higher classification schemes that have been proposed for the apodimorph families. One is all strisorean birds are classified in the order Caprimulgiformes, while the other is the strisorean birds are split into several distinct orders. In this case Apodimorphae is a subclade of Strisores that includes the orders Aegotheliformes (only including the owlet-nightjars of Australasia) and the Apodiformes (the swifts, treeswifts, and hummingbirds which have a global distribution).

The name Daedalornithes has also been used for the clade comprising owlet-nightjars, hummingbirds, and swifts. Daedalornithes and Apodimorphae have different definitions. Daedalornithes is defined as the crown group (the least inclusive clade that includes Aegotheles cristatus and Apus apus) whereas Apodimorphae referring the total-group (the most inclusive clade including Aegotheles cristatus and Apus apus but not Caprimulgus europaeus, Steatornis caripensis, Nyctibius grandis, or Podargus strigoides, a definition that includes fossil lineages more closely related to Daedalornithes than they are to other Strisores)
