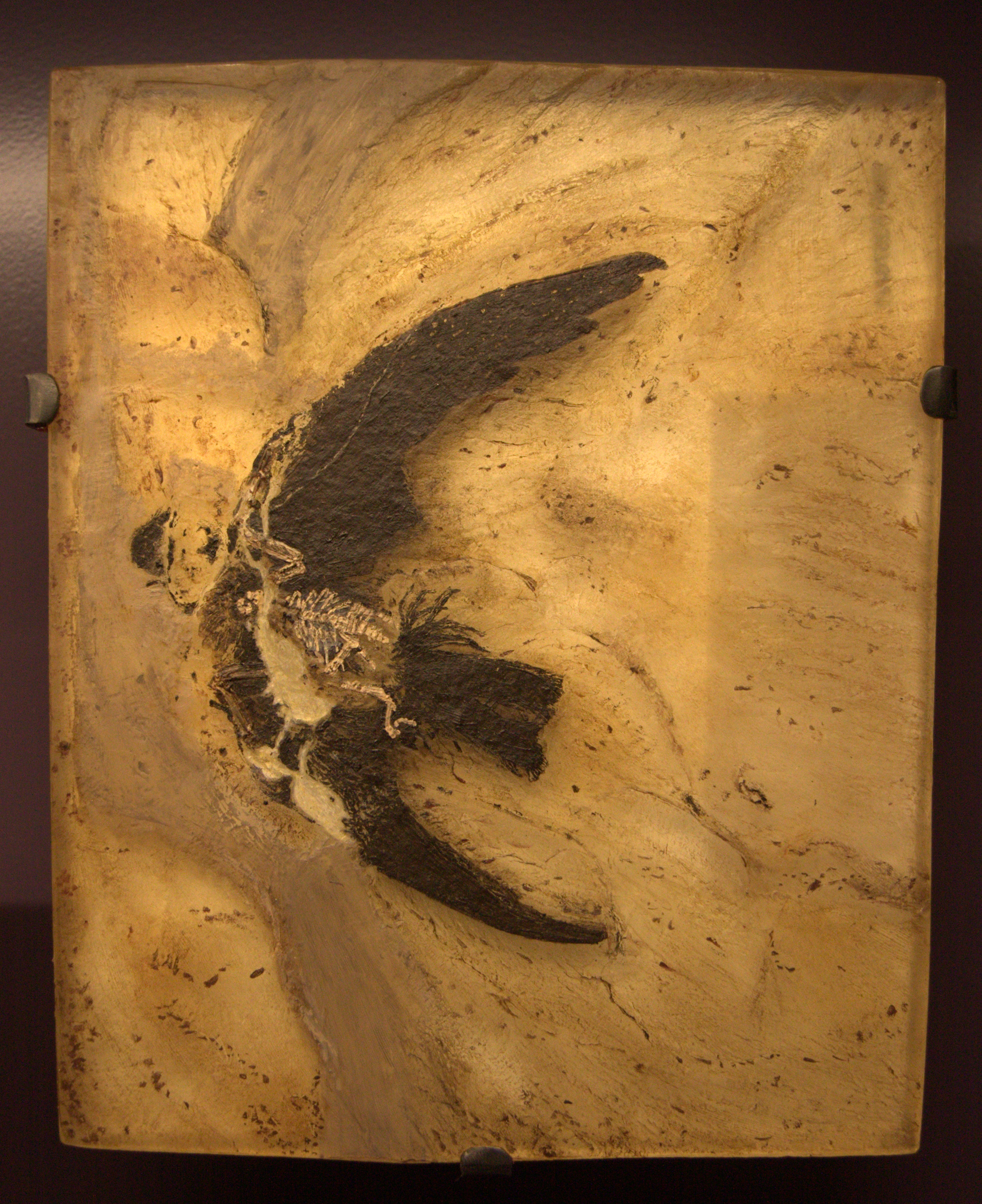

Scientific classification
- Kingdom: Animalia
- Phylum: Chordata
- Class: Aves
- Order: Apodiformes
- Family: Apodidae
- Genus: †Scaniacypselus; Harrison, 1984

Type species
- Scaniacypselus wardi Harrison, 1984

Species
- †Scaniacypselus szarskii (Peters, 1985); †Scaniacypselus wardi Harrison, 1984

= Scaniacypselus =

Scaniacypselus Temporal range: Eocene Ypresian

Extinct genus of bird

Scaniacypselus is an extinct genus of basal swifts from the Eocene of Denmark, Germany and France. Many well preserved specimens still showing plumage were discovered in the Messel Pit near Darmstadt, Germany. Species of Scaniacypselus had relatively broader wings than modern swifts and hindlimbs better adapted to perching on tree-branches, indicating that the bird was not as aerial as its extant relatives and likely nested in trees like hummingbirds and treeswifts. Two species are recognized, S. wardi and S. szarskii.

== History and naming ==
The first remains of Scaniacypselus were recovered by D.J. Ward from the Røsnæs Clay in Denmark. The type and only known specimen of S. wardi is an almost complete left wing. The second species, Scaniacypselus szarskii, was originally described as a species of Aegialornis by Peters in 1985 from the sediments of the Messel Pit in Germany. The species was referred to Scaniacypselus in 2001 by Mayr and Peters on the basis of an additional specimen. Isolated bones of S. szarksii are also known from Quercy, France.

The name derives from the Latin name of the region the type species was found in combined with "Cypselus", an old name of the common swift. The species name of Scaniacypselus wardi honors J.D. Ward who discovered the original fossil.

== Description ==
The type species, S. wardi, was noted to have had a short and stout humerus similar to modern swifts. The ulna was likewise relatively short and stout, however still more slender than what can be observed in extant forms. The proximal end of the ulna has a stronger cranial curvature to it and the olecranon is again shortened. The radius was not preserved in the holotype. The carpometacarpus generally resembled that of modern swifts, but with a more tapering os metacarpale majus.

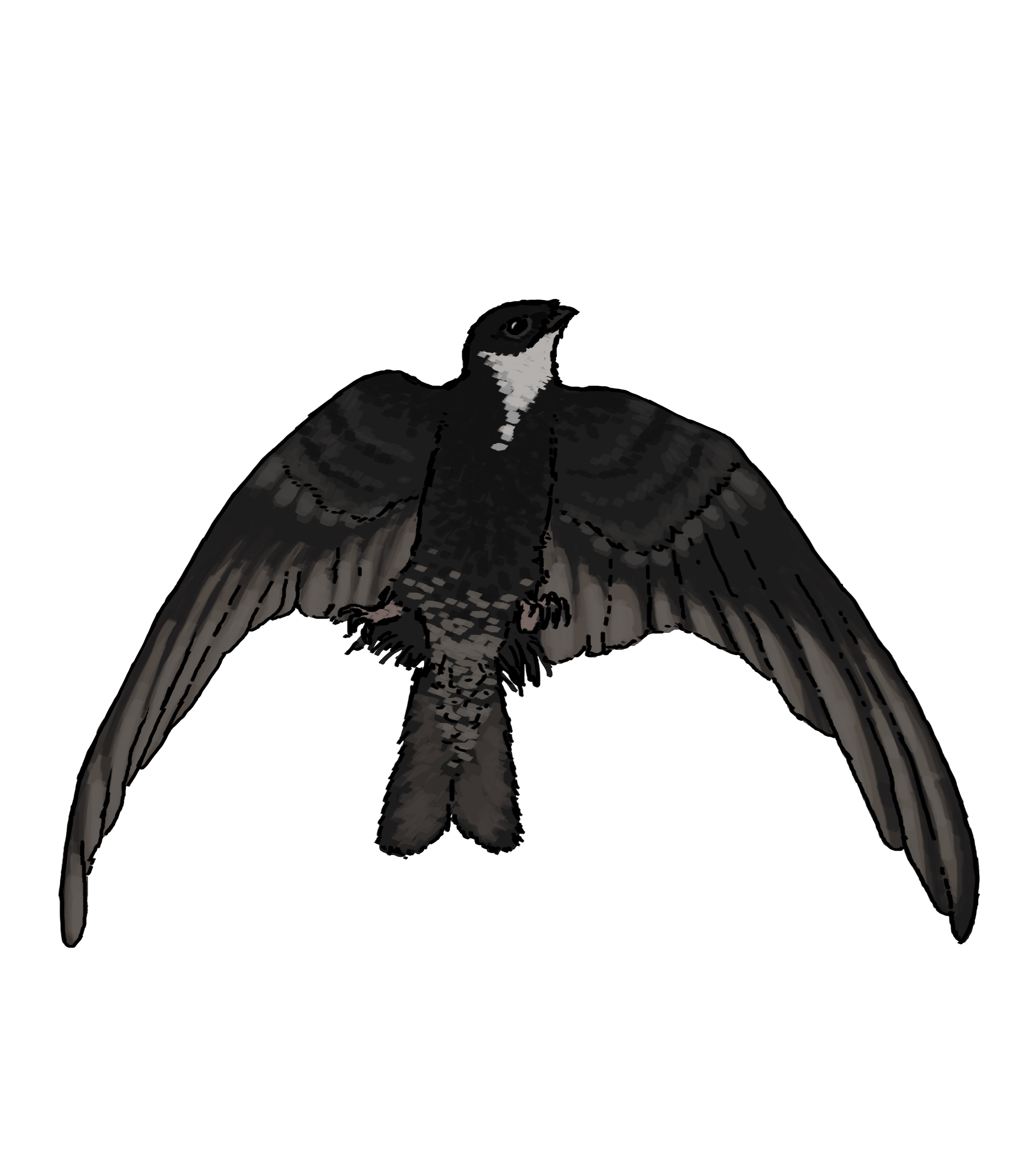
Artistic interpretation of Scaniacypselus

Although the type species is known from a single specimen, the second species, S. szarskii, is known from a multitude of individuals preserving not only skeletal elements but also soft tissue impressions. These specimens show several features clearly setting the genus apart from modern swifts. The crus dorsale fossae of the humerus is reduced and pneumatic fossae are missing in the fossils. Although this was first described in specimens from Messel, the same anatomy was also subsequently also recognized in fossils from France as well as the S. wardi holotype from Denmark. Scaniacypselus szarskii also differs notably in the proportions of the wings, with a relatively longer ulna and shorter carpometacarpus than its modern relatives. In this regard it more closely resembles treeswifts, with the exception of the short and stout humerus. The carpometacarpsus in the Messel specimens shows similar proportions to modern swifts, but with different osteological details. For instance, the pisiform process does not create a trough that receives the tendons of the finger-flexing musculature. Additionally, the process internus indicis is only weakly developed. In modern birds a strongly developed process correlates with narrow and elongated wings, which in turn suggests relatively short wings for Scaniacypselus. The sternum is shorter and broader proportionally, with some specimens showing an incision into its rear end. The nature of this incision is however not entirely understood, as it is only present in some specimens and not others. In adult modern swifts, the caudal margin of the sternum does not show such an incision, they are however present in subadults. The tarsometatarsus (lower leg) of Scaniacypselus is highly reduced but bears more resemblance to treeswifts. Although the legs of modern swifts are highly reduced, the tarsometatarsus in these species is proportionally much longer and more slender than in Scaniacypselus. The feet are described as anisodactyl, meaning that three toes face forward while one faces back. The proximal parts of the phalanges are not shortened and the tips of the toes are not strongly curved. Additionally, the attachment point for the muscle that flexes the toes is not as well developed as in crown-swifts.

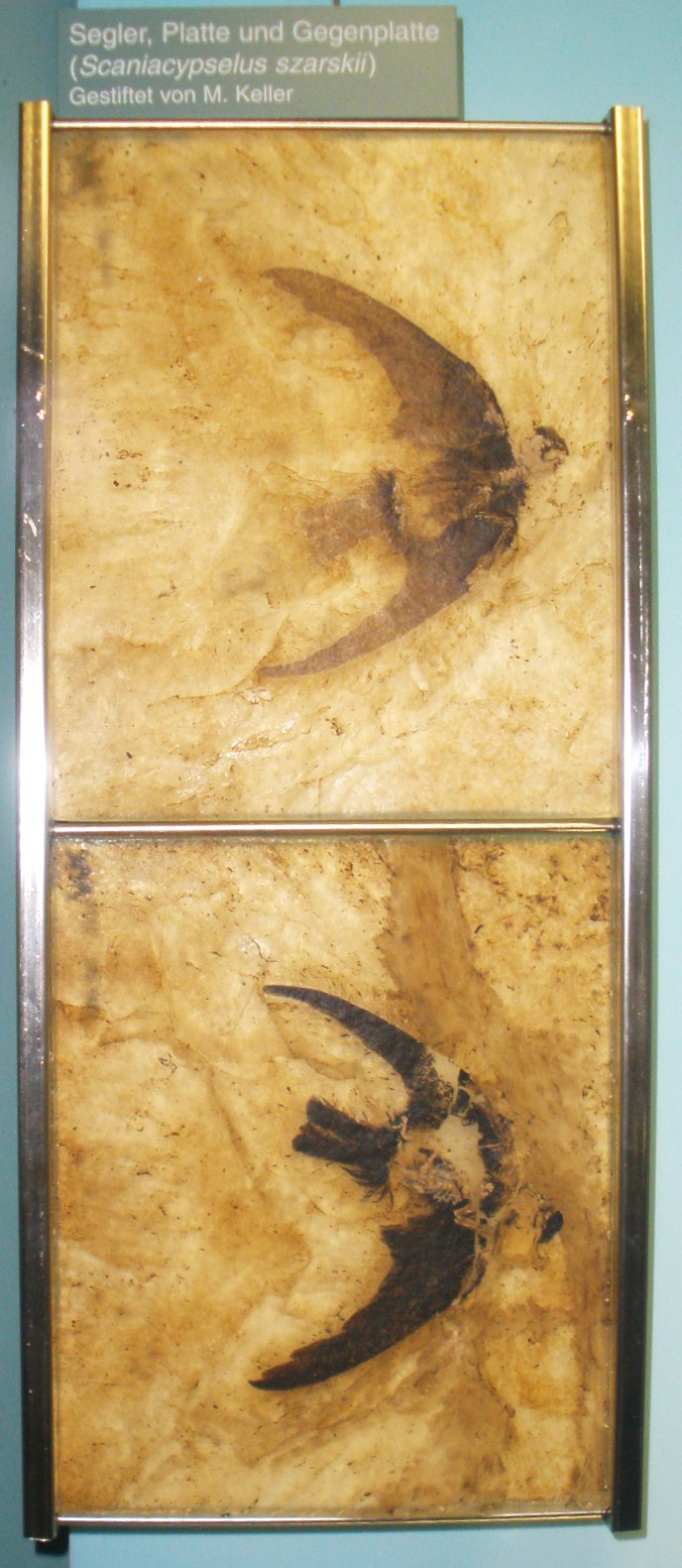
Fossils of Scaniacypselus from Germany

Wing shape is already indicated to have been relatively short by the osteology, which is confirmed by specimens preserving soft tissue such as feathers. These specimens show that the wings of Scaniacypselus weren't as long and narrow as in modern swifts of similar size. The tail feathers of Scaniacypselus was only lightly forked.

== Phylogeny ==
When first described researchers noted that the taxon shares several key characteristics with crown group swifts, consequently placing it in the subfamily Apodinae. The discovery of multiple additional specimens of S. szarskii however highlighted previously unknown features that set it apart from crown-group swifts. Mayr subsequently recovers Scaniacypselus not as a member of the family Apodinae, but instead as a more basal member of Apodidae.

- - Aegothelidae (Owlet-nightjar)
  - - †Eocypselus
    - - †Aegialornis
      - †Primapus
      - - Trochilidae (Hummingbirds)
          - †Parargornis
          - †Argornis
          - †Cypselavus
          - - †Jungornis
            - - †Eurotrochilus
              - Crown-Trochilidae (Hummingbirds)
        - - Hemiprocnidae (Treeswifts)
          - Apodidae (True Swifts)
            - †Scaniacypselus
            - - Cypseloidinae
              - Apodinae

== Paleobiology ==
The broader wings of Scaniacypselus clearly show that the taxon is much less specialised than modern swifts. While true swifts are highly aerial animals that spend most their lifes in the air, Scaniacypselus lived a much less airborne life. However their feeding range was likely much more extensive than that of the modern treeswifts, which are limited to hunting grounds close to the forest canopy.

The feet of the bird also give clues to its lifestyle. In its hindlimb proportions Scaniacypselus is much more similar to treeswifts and hummingbirds as well as other perching birds than to true swifts. It is thought that the relatively reduced hindlimbs of swifts are linked to their highly aerial lifestyle, while the relative elongation of the tarsometatarsus is an adaptation to taking on a vertical position while roosting. The shortened toes and curved claws with strong flexing musculature would also aid in this behavior. Members of the genus Apus mark somewhat of a departure of those adaptations, their tarsometatarsus reducing in length likely due to the fact that out of all swift species they are the most aerial, rendering the adaptations for vertical roosting less significant (although the bone is still proportionally longer than in Scaniacypselus).

The less derived anatomy of the legs together with the less specialised wings indicate that Scaniacypselus lived a different lifestyle compared to its modern relatives, roosting and nesting in a different manner. Specifically, the ability to perch like hummingbirds and treeswifts suggest that the animal was much more arboreal and nested in trees, spending much less time in flight than true swifts.

== See also ==
- Dinosaur coloration
