= Dinosaur coloration =

Studies of coloration in dinosaurs

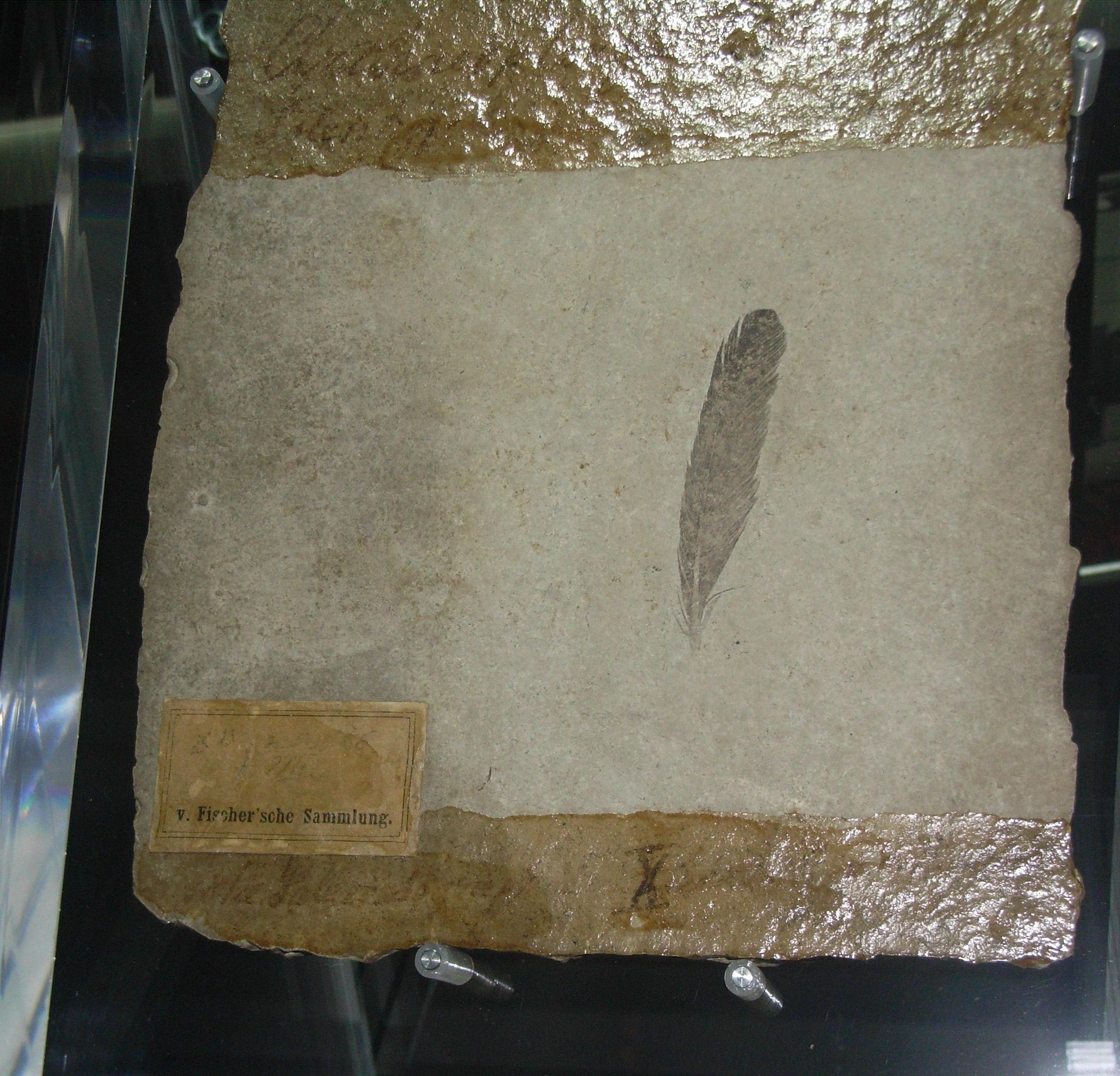
Archaeopteryx lithographica isolated feather with a black coloration

VOA report about the coloration of Psittacosaurus

Dinosaur coloration is generally one of the unknowns in the field of paleontology, as skin pigmentation is nearly always lost during the fossilization process. However, studies of feathered dinosaurs and skin impressions have shown the colour of some species can be inferred through the analysis of colour-determining organelles known as melanosomes that are preserved in fossilized skin and feathers.

== Feathered dinosaurs ==
=== Anchiornis ===
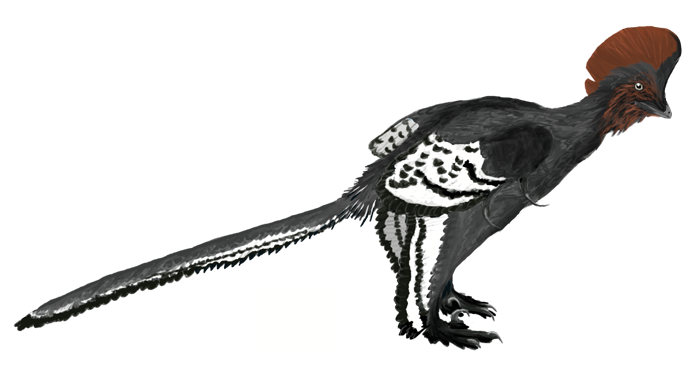
Life restoration of Anchiornis with a red crest and black, white, and grey feathers

In 2010, paleontologists studied a well-preserved skeleton of Anchiornis, an averaptoran from the Tiaojishan Formation in China, and found melanosomes within its fossilized feathers. As different shaped melanosomes determine different colours, analysis of the melanosomes allowed the paleontologists to infer that Anchiornis had black, white and grey feathers all over its body and a crest of dark red or ochre feathers on its head.

In 2015, another specimen was reported to possess melanosomes that induced grey and black coloration, but no red or brown coloration. This may have been due to sexual dimorphism, differences in testing methods, or a different age or species of the second specimen tested.

=== Archaeopteryx ===
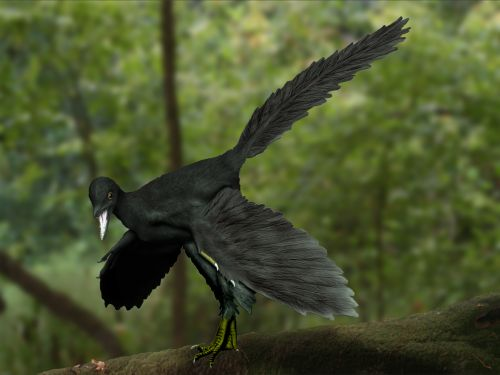
Life restoration of Archaeopteryx with black feathers

In 2012, Ryan Carney and colleagues produced the first colour study on an Archaeopteryx specimen. Fossilized melanosomes suggested a primarily black coloration in the feathers of the specimen. The feather studied was likely a covert, which would have partly covered the primary feathers on the wings. Carney pointed out that this is consistent with the flight feathers of modern birds, in which black melanosomes have structural properties that strengthen feathers for flight.

In 2013, a study published in the Journal of Analytical Atomic Spectrometry by Manning et al. reported new analyses on the feather revealing that Archaeopteryx may have had light and dark coloured plumage, with only the tips of the feathers being primarily black instead of the entire feather. Whether or not this coloration was primarily for display or flight is currently unknown.

A follow-up study by Carney and colleagues in 2020 suggested that the feather was matte black, not iridescent, with 90% probability, owing to the less elongated shape of the melanosomes. However, they noted that some of the melanosomes preserved three-dimensionally in the specimen were distorted to give the impression of iridescent melanosomes. Unlike Manning and colleagues, they reconstructed the feather as being completely dark at the tip.

=== Beipiaosaurus ===
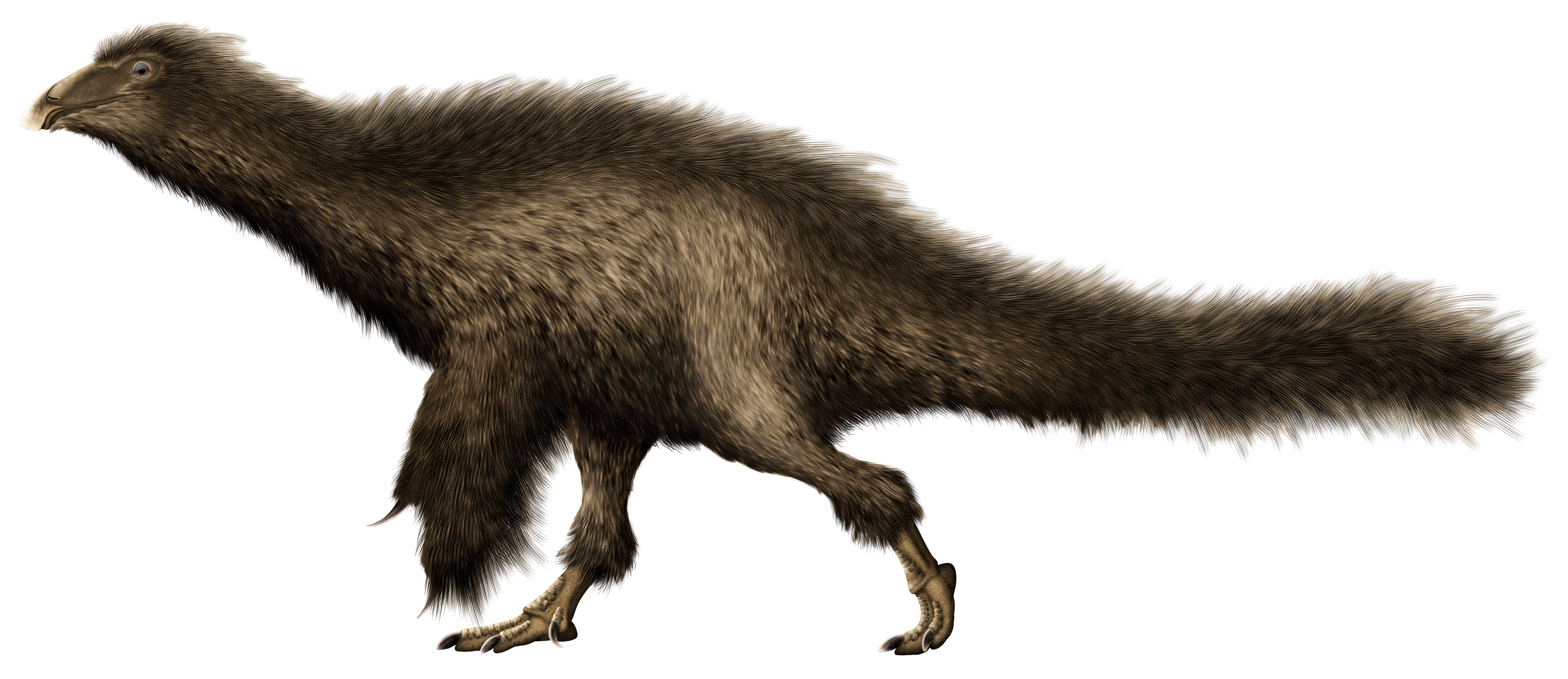
Life restoration of Beipiaosaurus with brown feathers

Beipiaosaurus had a dense covering of downy-like fibers along with a secondary coat of longer, simpler feathers. In a study of the colour and shape of fossilized melanosomes in numerous extant and fossil specimens, Li et al. (2014) found that the preserved feathers in the neck area of the Beipiaosaurus specimen implied brownish and dark brownish coloration.

=== Caihong ===
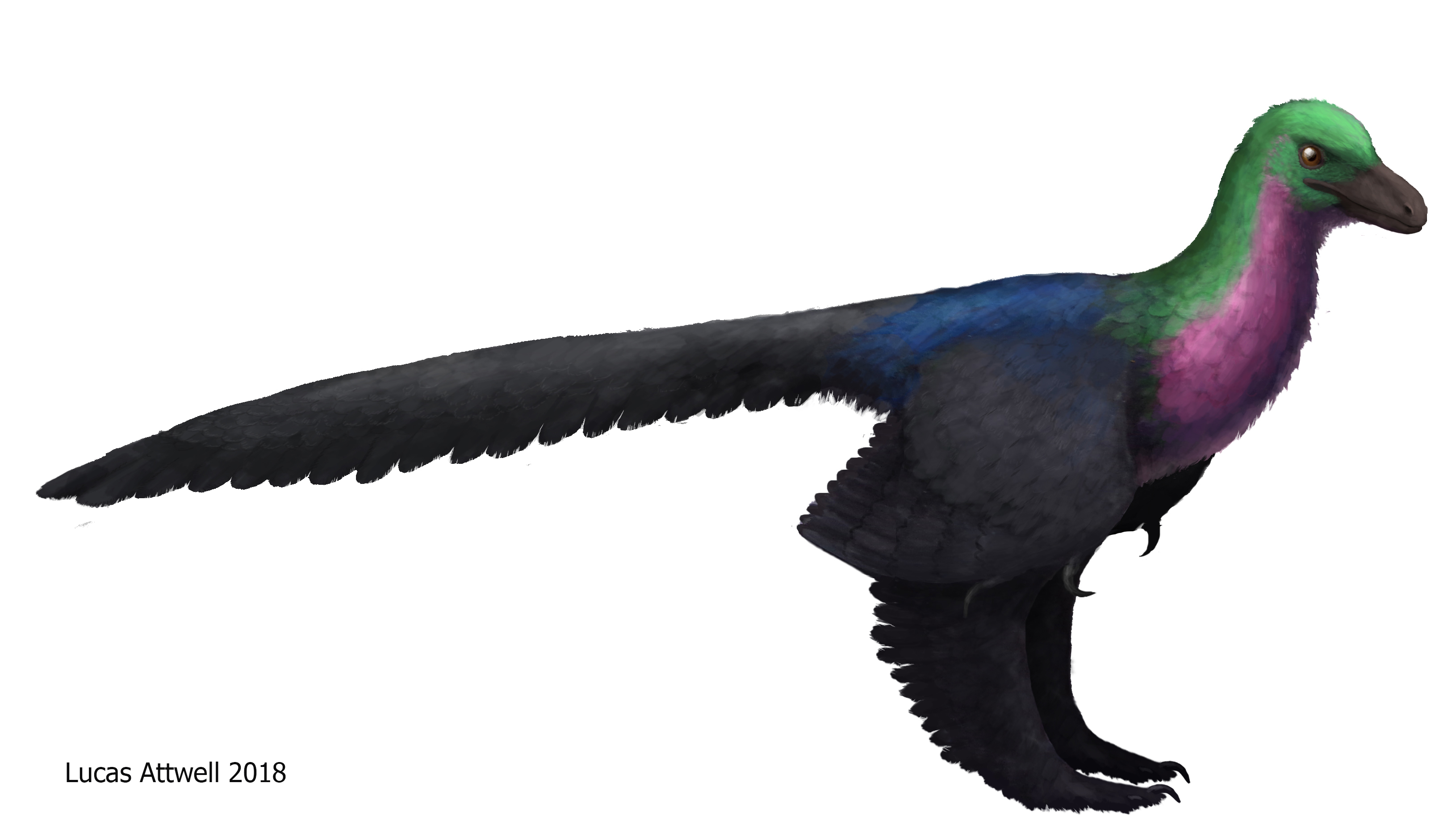
Life restoration of Caihong with black and iridescent feathers

The fossilized feathers of Caihong possessed nanostructures which were analyzed and interpreted as melanosomes. They showed similarity to organelles that produce a black iridescent colour in extant birds. Other feathers found on the head, chest, and the base of the tail preserve flattened sheets of platelet-like melanosomes very similar in shape to those which create brightly coloured iridescent hues in the feathers of modern hummingbirds. However, these structures are seemingly solid and lack air bubbles, and thus are internally more akin to the melanosomes in trumpeters than hummingbirds. Caihong represents the oldest known evidence of platelet-like melanosomes.

=== Caudipteryx ===
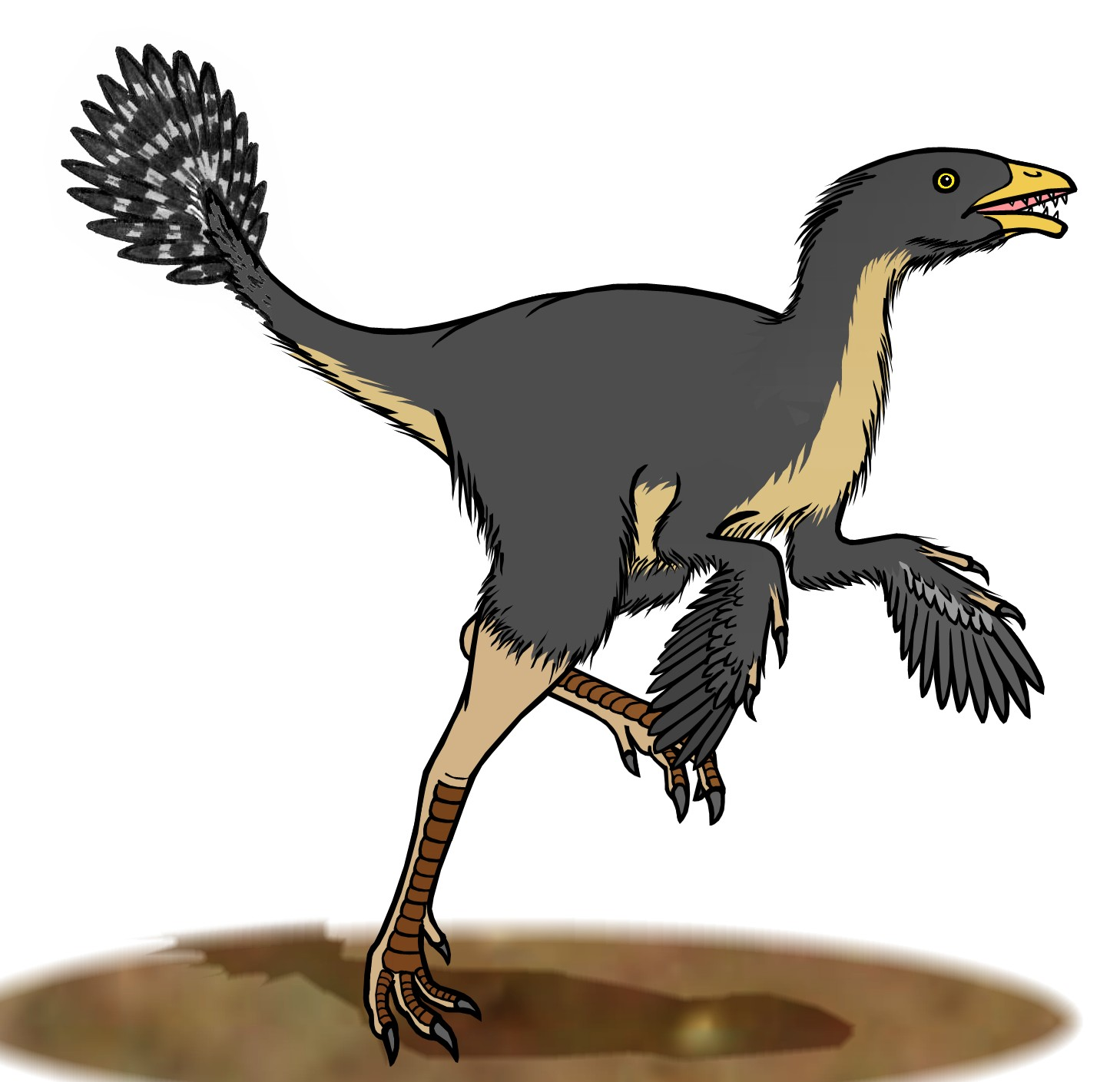
Life restoration of Caudipteryx with dark grey feathers and a banded tail

In the 1998 description of Caudipteryx, Qiang et al. noted the existence of preserved colour bands on the fossilized tail feathers of the holotype specimen. Later studies indicated that the body feathers of Caudipteryx contained eumelanin, a pigment lending dark grey/black shades.

=== Huadanosaurus ===
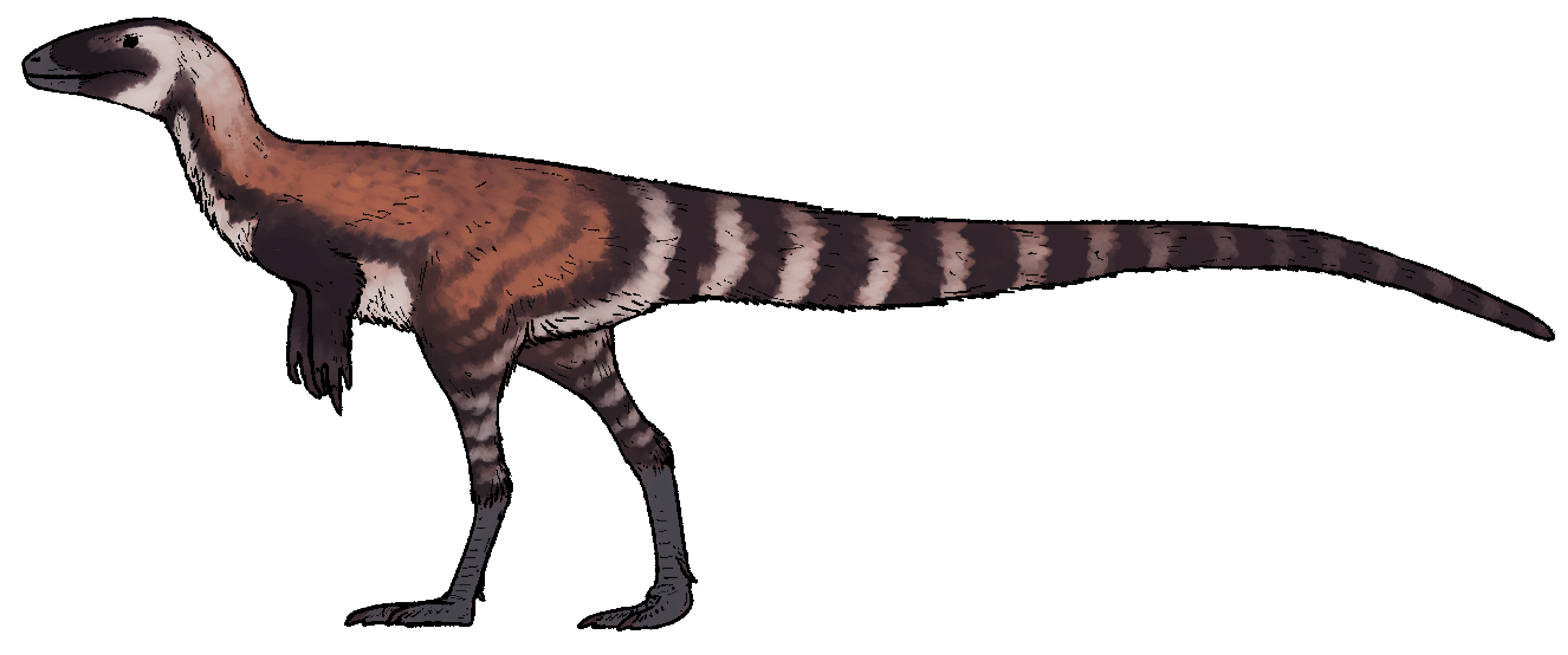
Speculative life restoration of Huadanosaurus based on preserved melanosomes and colour patterns of Sinosauropteryx specimens

Zhang et al. (2010) discovered melanosomes in the holotype of Huadanosaurus (IVPP V14202, which was provisionally referred to Sinosauropteryx in this study) and some other feathered dinosaurs. It was suggested that Huadanosaurus had rufous or light brown feathers, probably used for display.

=== Microraptor ===
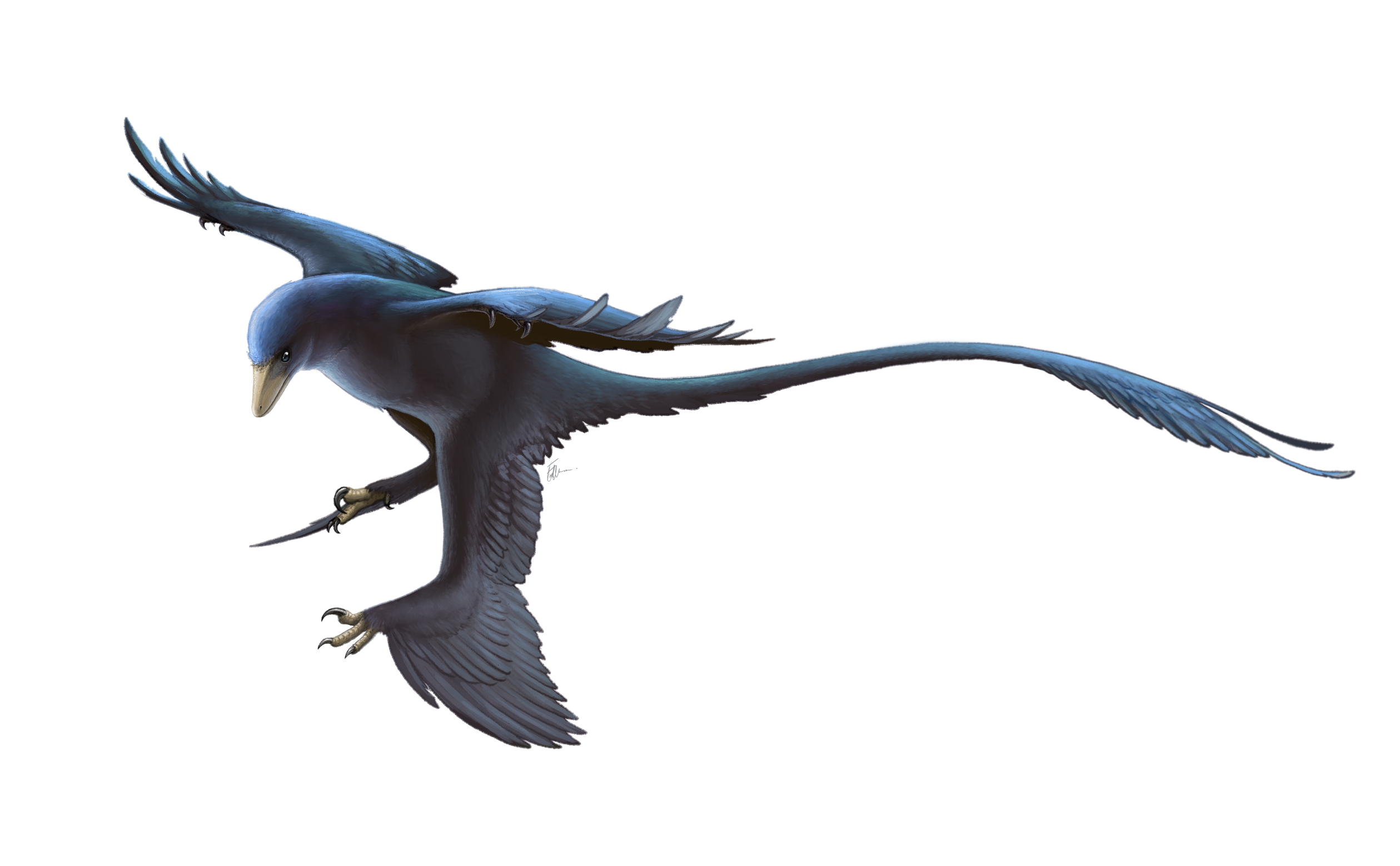
Life restoration of Microraptor with iridescent feathers

In 2012, Quanguo Li and colleagues analyzed BMNHC PH881, a specimen of Microraptor, and determined that the coloration of typical Microraptor feathers was iridescent black. The melanosomes were narrow and arranged in stacked layers, reminiscent of the blackbird. Previous research had suggested that Microraptor was nocturnal due to the morphology of its scleral ring. However, the dark and glossy nature of its feathers may suggest otherwise, since no modern birds with comparable plumage are known to be nocturnal.

=== Sinornithosaurus ===
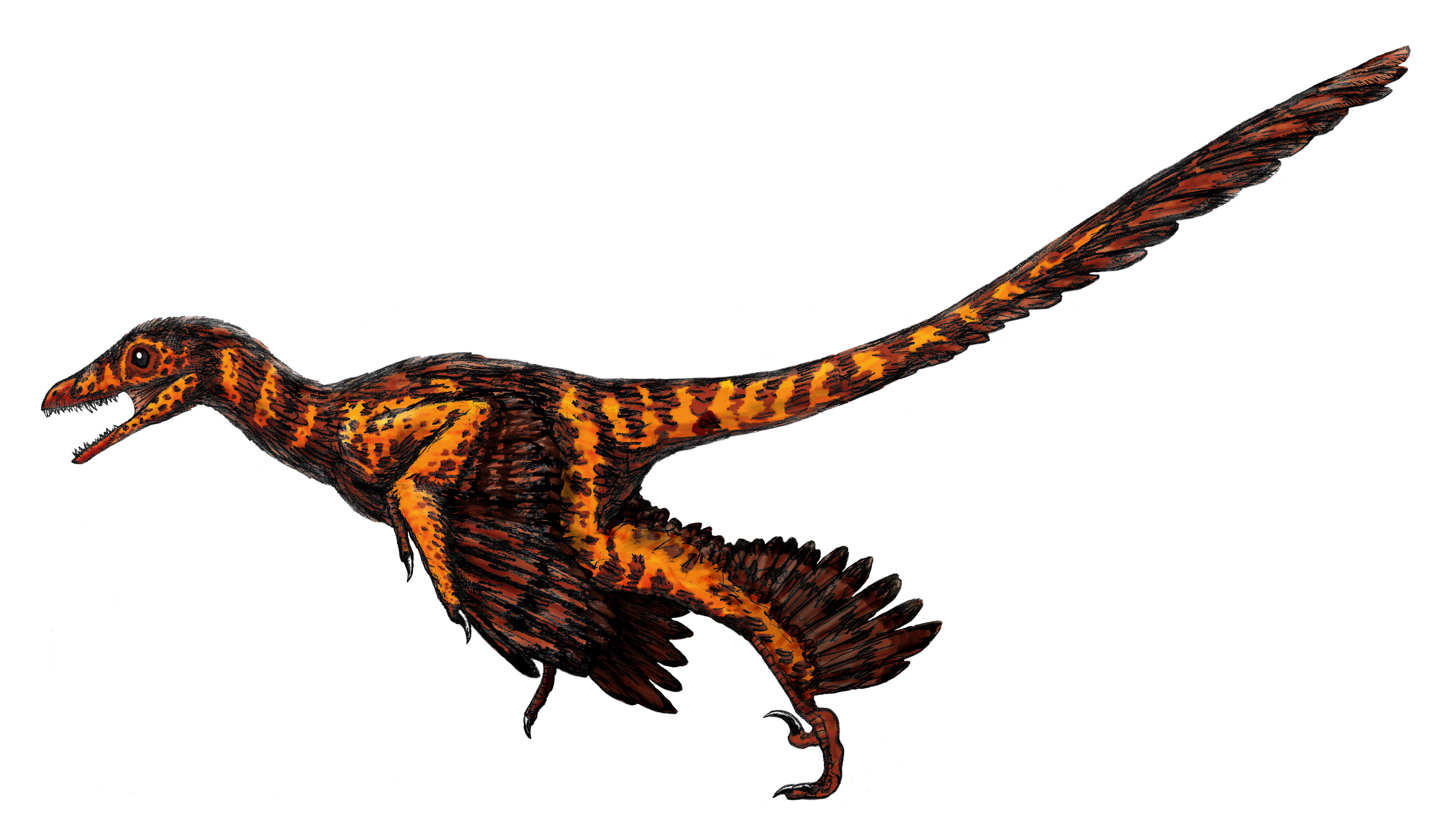
Life restoration of Sinornithosaurus with black and rufous feathers

In 2010, a team of researchers analyzed the holotype remains of Sinornithosaurus (IVPP V12811) and other feathered dinosaurs from the Yixian and discovered melanosomes. The presence of rod-shaped and spherical-shaped melanosomes suggested that Sinornithosaurus had black and rufous feathers. Unfortunately, the exact location of these colours on the body is unknown, so the colour pattern cannot confidently be determined.

=== Sinosauropteryx ===
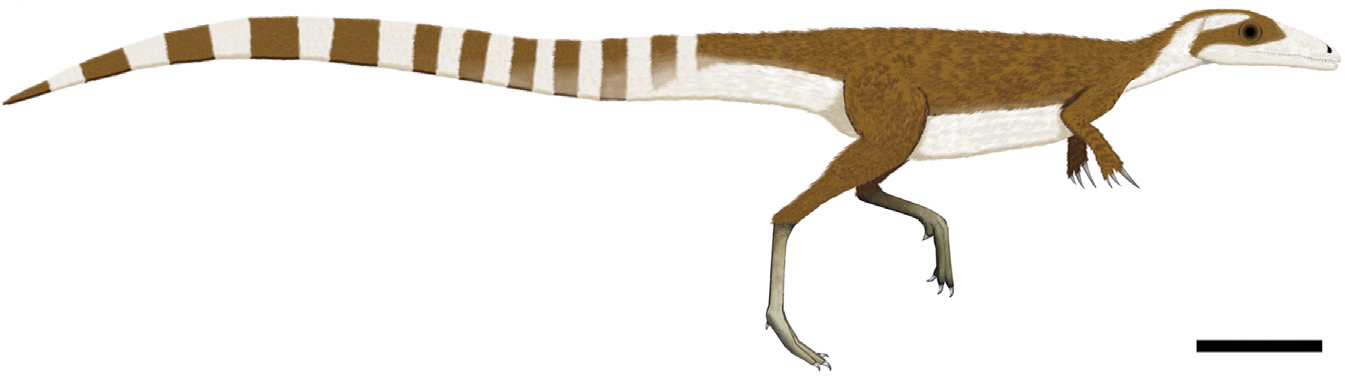
Life restoration of Sinosauropteryx with likely patterns based on specimens of Sinosauropteryx and colours based on melanosomes preserved in Huadanosaurus

A 2017 study by Smithwick et al. examined three specimens of Sinosauropteryx and reported that the body coloration of Sinosauropteryx extended to the face, creating a raccoon-like "mask" around the eyes. They hypothesized that the countershaded pattern of Sinosauropteryx with the banded pattern of its tail likely acted as camouflage in an open environment.

=== Wulong ===
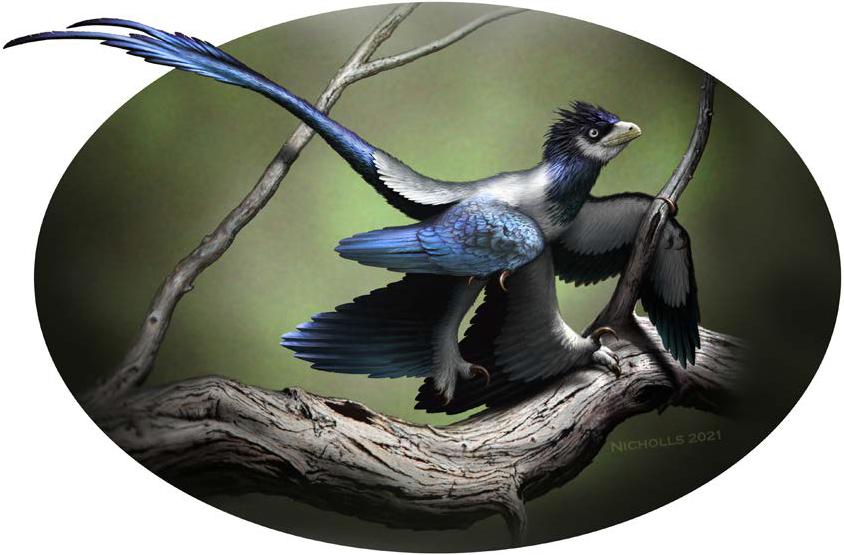
Life restoration of Wulong with iridescent wings and a grey body

In 2023, Croudace et al. described the likely plumage coloration of the Wulong holotype, a complete articulated specimen of a one-year-old individual. They proposed that the feathers on the forelimbs and hindlimbs were iridescent, with feathers on the rest of the body being grey. They suggested that, since the Wulong holotype is a juvenile, the iridescence may indicate purposes of intraspecific signalling and communication, rather than solely sexual signalling.

=== Prehistoric avialans ===
==== Bohaiornithid (CUGB P1202) ====
An unnamed bohaiornithid enantiornithine specimen preserved on a slab and counterslab was described in 2016 by Peteya et al. Their analysis of the extensive covering of fossilized feathers suggested that the crown, neck, and body contour feathers were weakly iridescent.

==== Calciavis ====
In a 2020 study, Eliason and Clarke determined that the feathers on the head, tail, and wing primaries of the Eocene lithornithid Calciavis were iridescent, likely glossy black. Additionally tested feathers from the fossilized wings were black.

==== Changzuiornis ====
In their 2016 description of the Early Cretaceous ornithuran bird Changzuiornis, Huang et al. noted melanosomes indicative of black coloration in the fossilized feathers of the wings and leg/tail region.

==== Confuciusornis ====
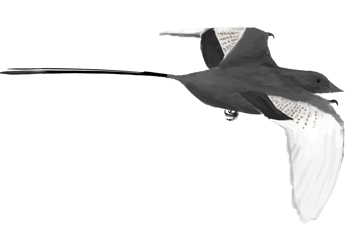
Life restoration of Confuciusornis sanctus with a dark body and tail feathers and light wings

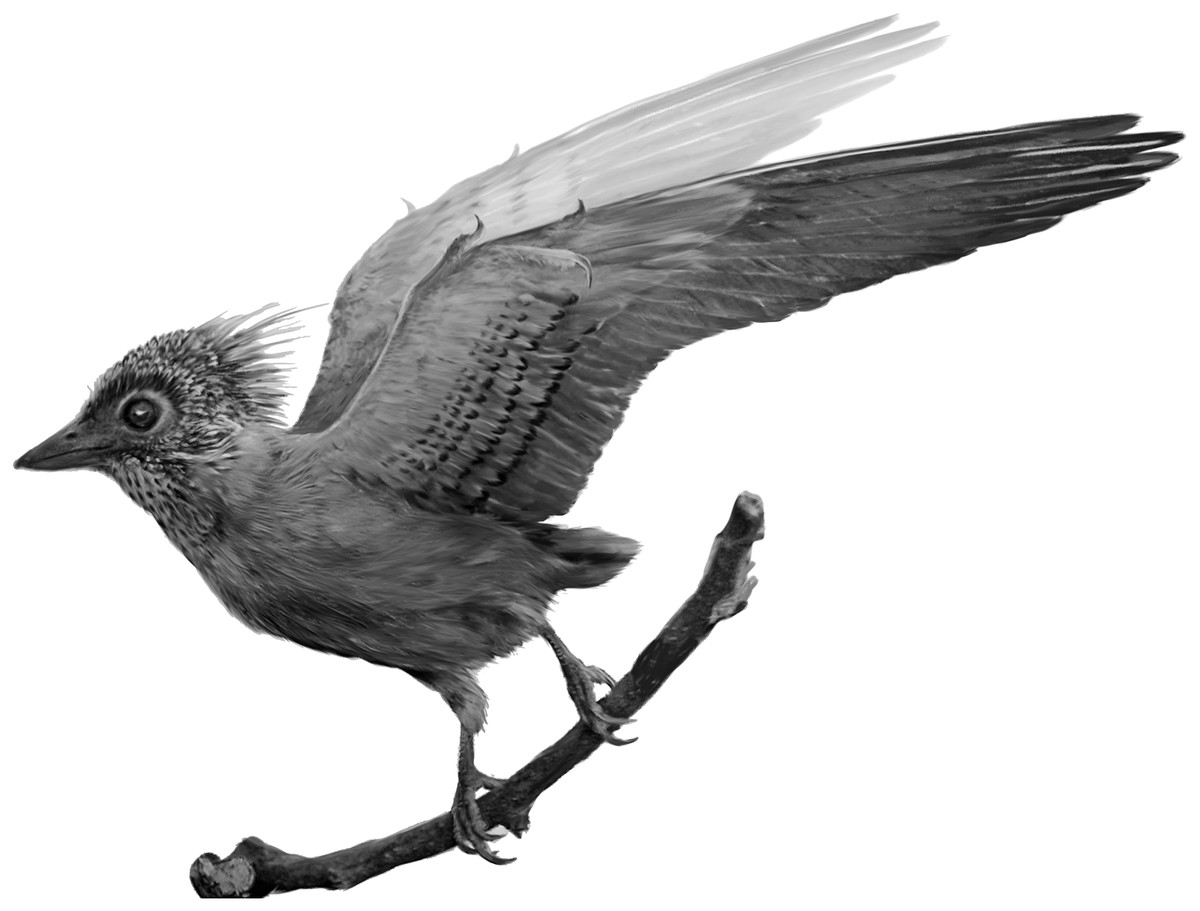
Life restoration of Confuciusornis sp. with plumage colours and patterns inferred from CUGB P1401

In 2010, Zhang et al. examined fossils of feathered dinosaurs with preserved melanosomes. After studying these with an electron microscope, they found eumelanosomes and pheomelanosomes preserved in a specimen of Confuciusornis, (IVPP V13171). This suggested that Confuciusornis had hues of grey, red/brown and black. This was the first time that an early bird fossil had been shown to contain preserved pheomelanosomes. However, Wogelius et al. (2011) failed to find these reported traces of pheomelanosomes. They found a link between the presence of certain metals like copper, and preserved melanin. Using a combination of preserved melanosomes and metals in the feathers, they reconstructed Confuciusornis sanctus with dark-coloured body and upper wing feathers, but found no trace of either melanosomes or metals in the majority of the wing feathers. They suggested that the wings of Confuciusornis may have been white or coloured with carotenoid pigments. The long tail feathers of male specimens would have also been darker in colour.

In 2018, Li et al. reported extensively preserved melanosomes and plumage patterns in the fossilized feathers of another specimen (CUGB P1401) of a species of Confuciusornis. They noted primarily dark colours with the feathers on the wings, covert feathers, crest, and throat having complex patterns of small dark spots. Comparing the preserved patterns of Confuciusornis with extant birds, they further suggested that this pattern was used as camouflage.

==== Cruralispennia ====
Life restoration of Cruralispennia with dark feathers

Structures believed to be fossilized melanosomes were found in five feather samples from the only known specimen of the enantiornithean bird Cruralispennia using scanning electron microscopy. Due to their rod-like shape, they were identified as eumelanosomes, which correspond to dark shades. Although specific colours were not stated in the analysis, other studies have shown that coloration in extant birds correlates to the length and aspect ratio (length to width ratio) of their eumelanosomes. A sample taken from the crural feathers had eumelanosomes with the shortest aspect ratio, which may have corresponded to dark brown coloration. The highest aspect ratio eumelanosomes were found in a sample from the head feathers. High aspect ratios have been known to correlate with glossy or iridescent colours, although without knowing the structure of a feather's keratin layer (which does not fossilize well), no hue can be assigned for certain. The wing and tail samples also had high aspect ratios, while the tail's eumelanosomes were the largest sampled.

==== Eoconfuciusornis ====
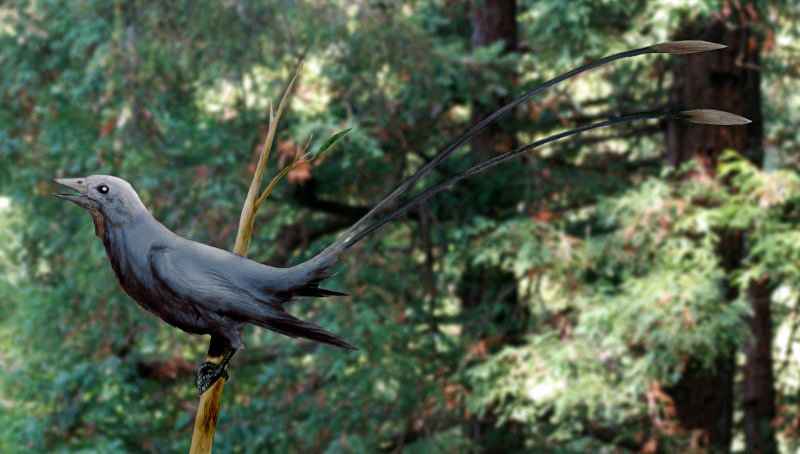
Life restoration of Eoconfuciusornis with black, grey, and brown feathers

Zheng et al. determined the likely colours of a specimen of Eoconfuciusornis in 2017. They suggested that the feathers of the wing coverts, nape, and tail were black, the feathers on the leg and top of the head were grey, and the feathers on the throat were brown. The secondary remiges had a dark spotted pattern.

==== Eocoracias ====
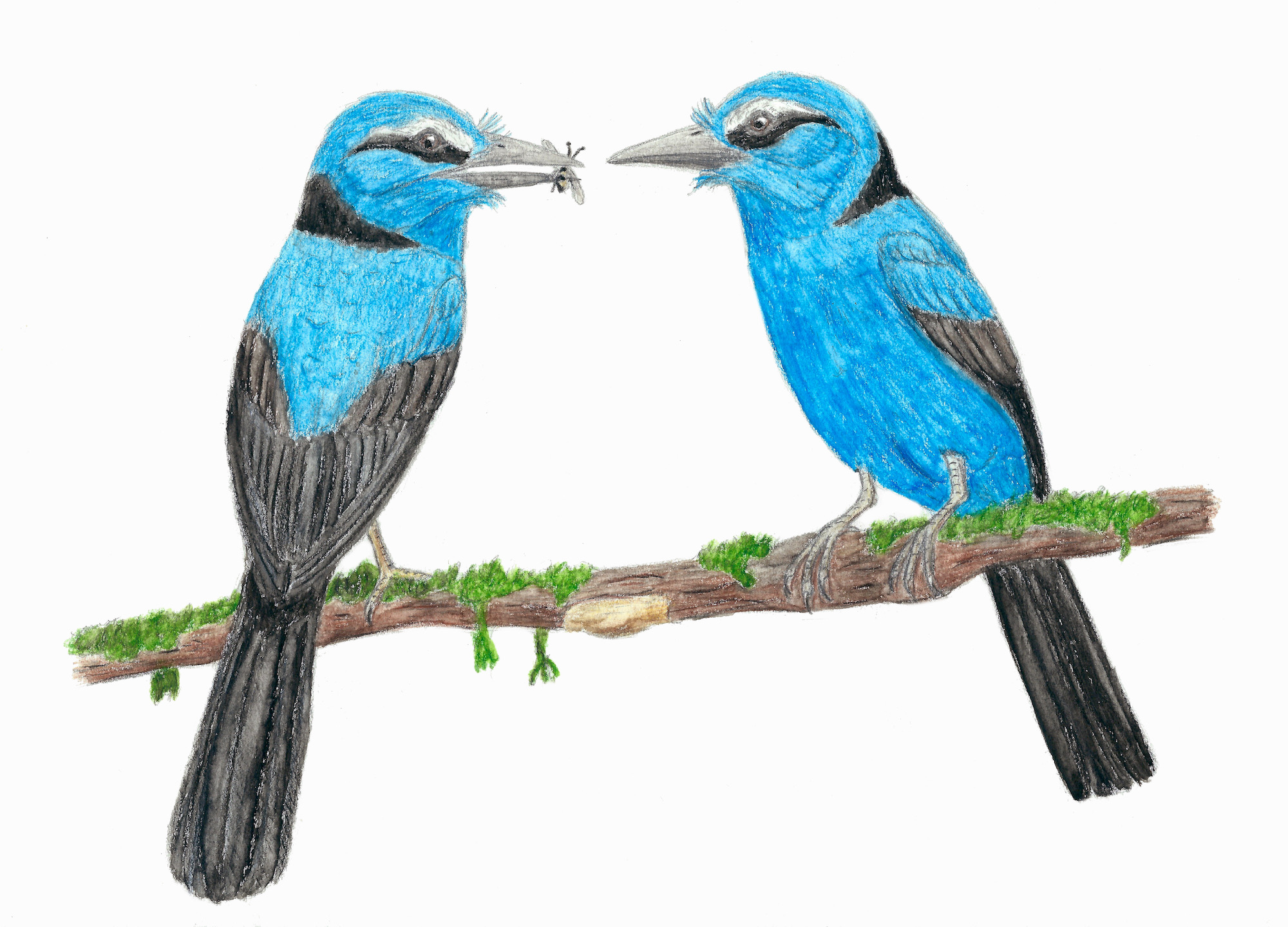
Life restoration of Eocoracias with black and blue feathers

In 2019, Babarović et al. studied a specimen of the Eocene coraciiform Eocoracias. They observed non-iridescent structural coloration on its feathers, the first time such has been found in a bird fossil. They reconstructed parts of the neck, tail and rump of Eocoracias as black, with the rest of the body plumage being blue. The wing feathers were also black and blue.

==== Eocypselus ====
In 2013, Daniel T. Ksepka et al. described a new species of the Eocene bird Eocypselus, E. rowei from the Green River Formation. The holotype specimen, preserved on a slab and counterslab, contains fossilized feather imprints. Ksepka et al. tested the feathers on the top of the head for preserved melanosomes, and noted densely packed, rod-like eumelanosomes, which typically create iridescent black colours.

==== Inkayacu ====
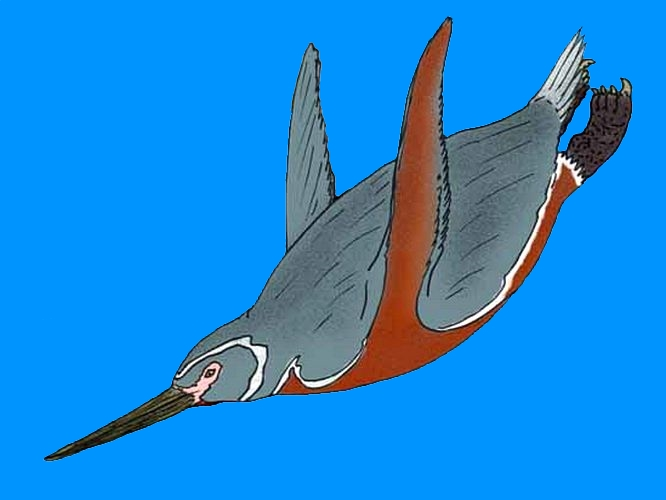
Life restoration of Inkayacu with grey and reddish-brown feathers

The melanosomes within the feathers of the Eocene penguin Inkayacu are long and narrow, similar to most birds. Their shape suggests that Inkayacu had grey and reddish-brown feathering across its body. Most modern penguins have melanosomes that are of similar length to those of Inkayacu, but are much wider. There are also a greater number of them within living penguins' cells. The shape of these melanosomes gives them a dark brown or black colour, and is the reason why modern penguins are mostly black and white.

==== Iteravis ====
Wang et al. (2018) analyzed the elongate, closely spaced melanosomes preserved in the feathers of a specimen of the Early Cretaceous ornithurine Iteravis to determine that they were likely black in colour.

==== Messelornis ====
A single fossilized feather, likely belonging to Messelornis, was described in 2015 by Colleary et al. They suggested that the feather, likely coming from the wing, would probably have been iridescent in life.

==== Pellornis ====
In 2019, Musser, Ksepka & Field determined that a long feather from the tail of the Eocene bird Pellornis would have been a black-brown colour.

==== Primotrogon ====
Grey and iridescent colours were detected in a specimen of cf. Primotrogon sp., an Eocene trogon, by Nordén et al. in 2018. They note that the grey feathers could be down, which is often seen in shades of grey or white, so the colour patterns of Primotrogon cannot be confidently determined.

==== Protopteryx ====
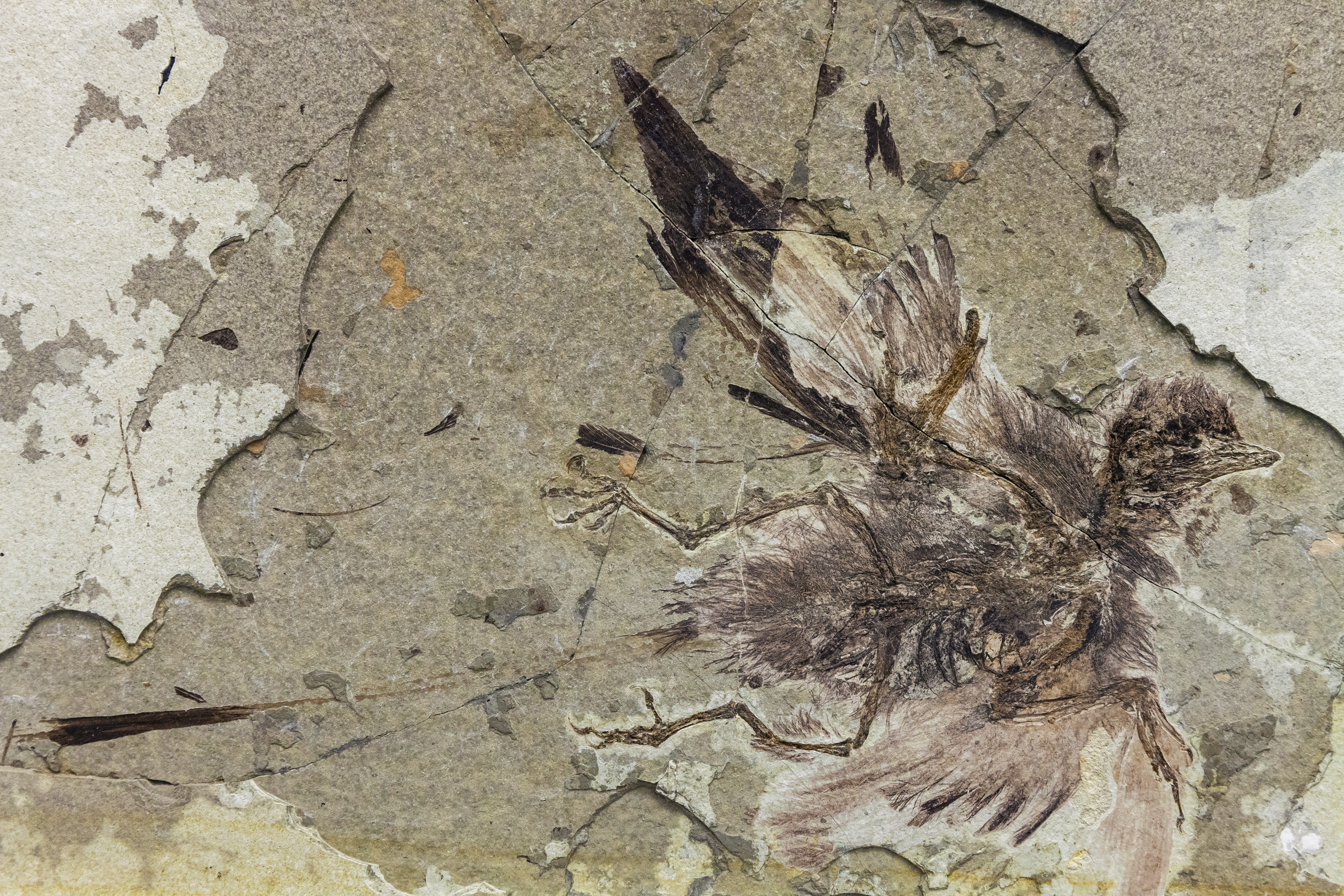
A fossil of Protopteryx with preserved black feathers

In a 2020 study by O'Connor et al., they analyzed a wing feather of the Early Cretaceous enantiornithean Protopteryx and found evidence of eumelanosomes, suggesting that it had black, non-iridescent feathers.

==== Scaniacypselus ====
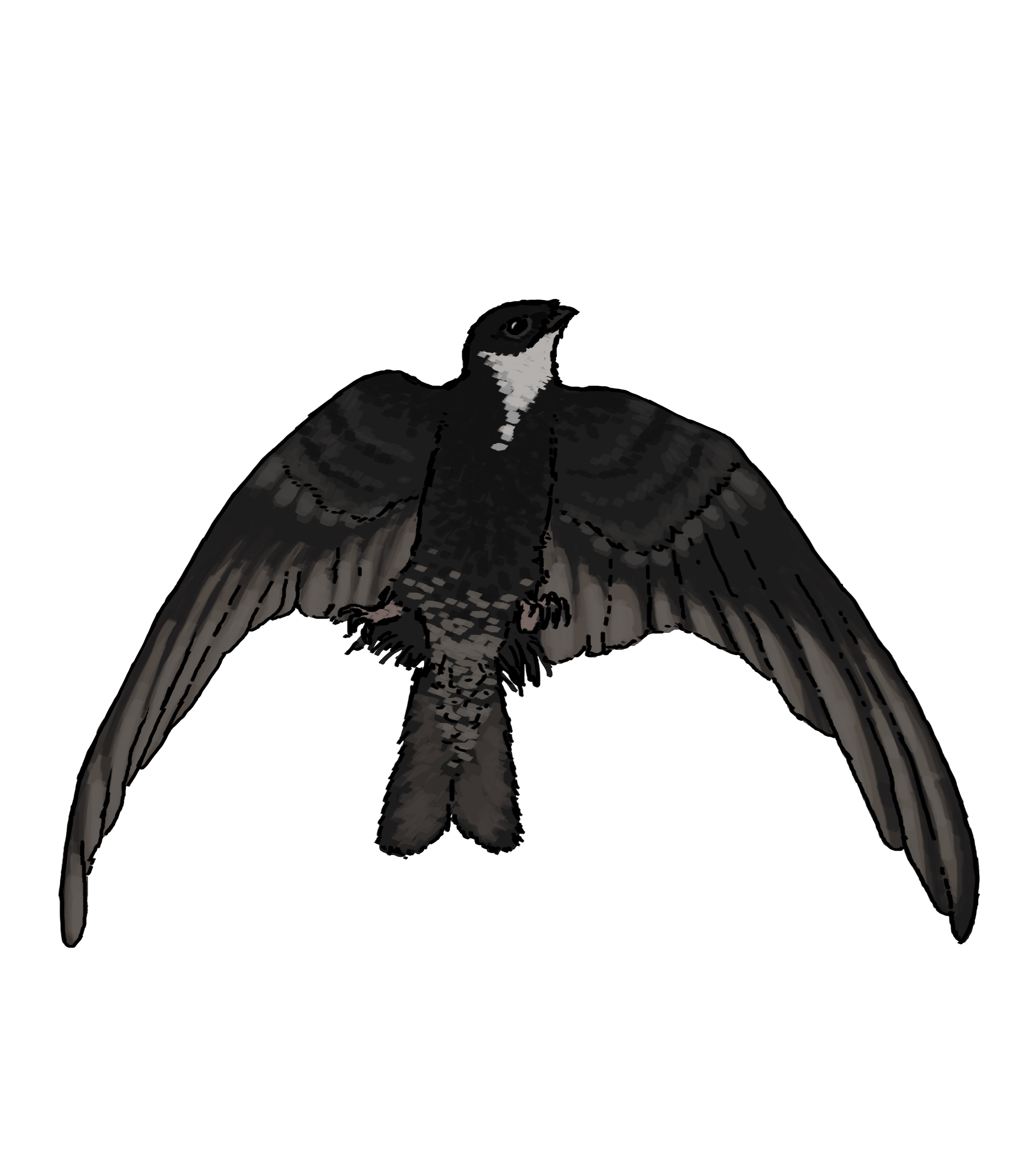
Life restoration of Scaniacypselus with grey feathers

Nordén et al. (2018) studied two specimens of the Eocene swift Scaniacypselus szarskii. They primarily observed grey and brown colours, and noted that it likely had no iridescent feathers.

==== Shangyang ====
Li et al. (2025) studied melanosomes in the head crest of a specimen of the enantiornithean Shangyang sp. from the Lower Cretaceous Jiufotang Formation (China) and interpreted them as indicative of red to deep blue iridescent coloration.

==== Yuanchuavis ====
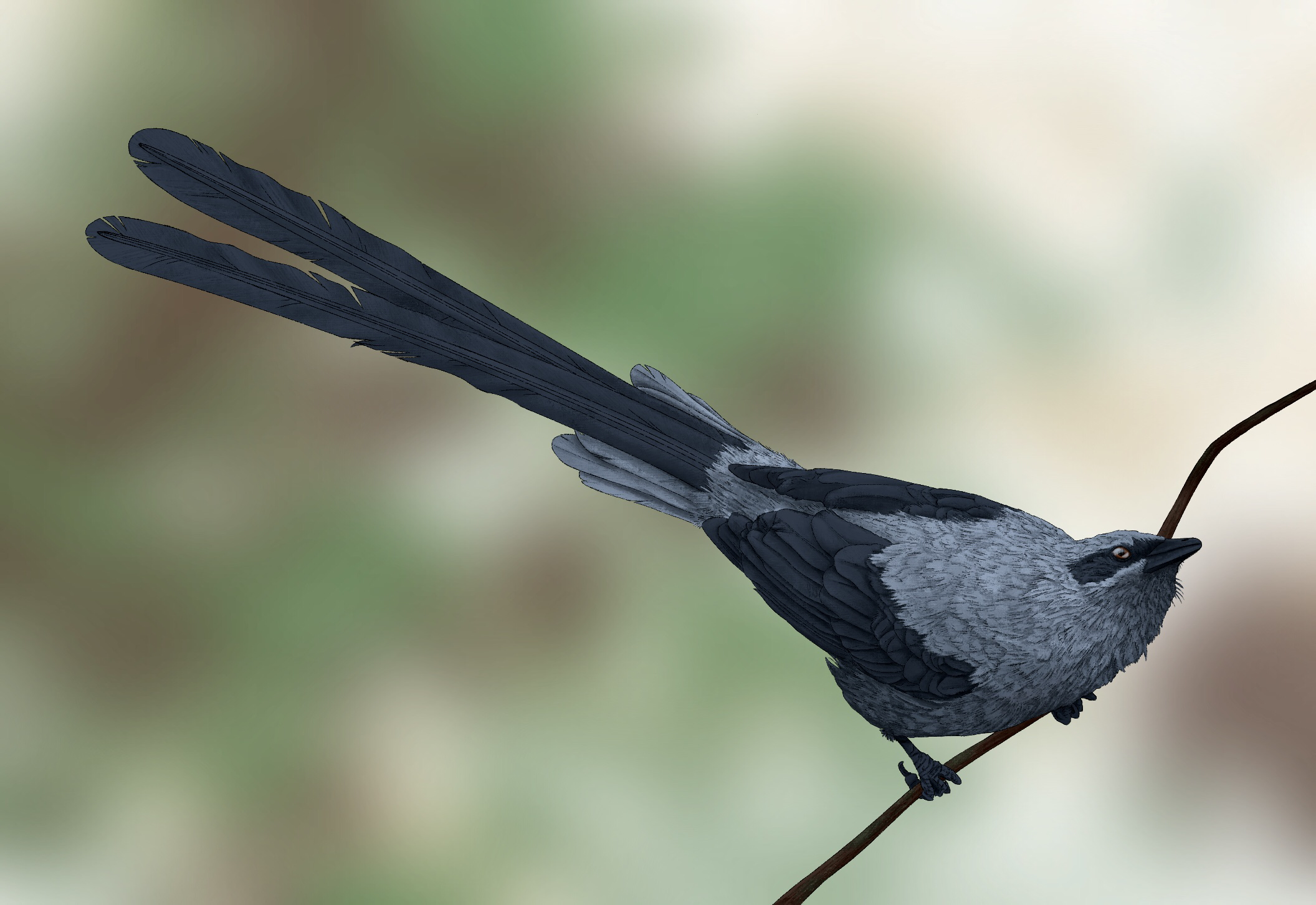
Life restoration of Yuanchuavis with long black central rectrices and smaller grey rectrices

In their 2021 description of the Early Cretaceous pengornithid Yuanchuavis, Wang et al. described the presence of eumelanosomes in the preserved tail feathers. The paired central rectrices are dark, while the smaller feathers are non-iridescent, likely grey.

== Non-feathered dinosaurs ==
=== Borealopelta ===
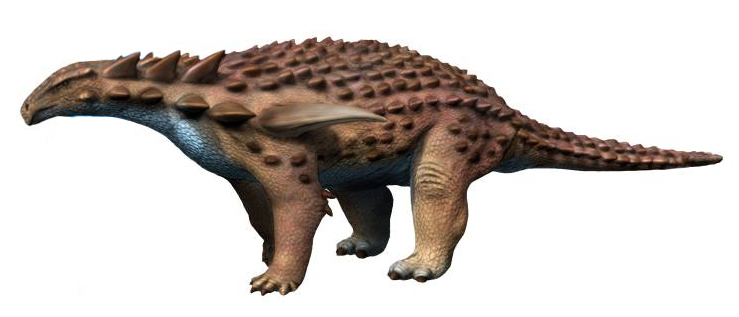
Life restoration of Borealopelta with reddish-brown colours

A 2017 examination of melanosomes preserved in a specimen of Borealopelta indicated that the nodosaurid had a reddish-brown coloration in life, with a counter-shaded pattern that may have been used for camouflage. This discovery may indicate that Borealopelta was under threat of predation, despite its large size, and that the armor on its back was primarily used for defensive rather than display purposes.

=== Hadrosaur (YPMPU 016969) ===
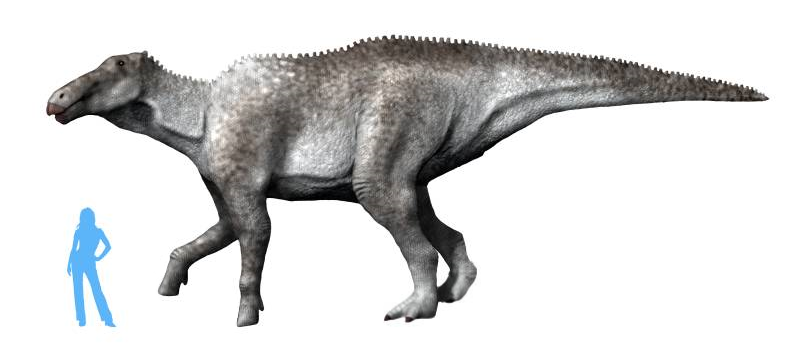
Life restoration of a hadrosaur (Shantungosaurus) with grey-coloured skin

A 2020 examination of a sample of 3D preserved fossil skin (YPMPU 016969) from the flank of a hadrosaurid revealed the presence of eumelanin in the specimen. Fabbri et al. hypothesized that this may suggest a grey colour, comparable to the skin of extant rhinoceros and elephants. This coloration may further imply that some hadrosaurs occupied similar ecological niches to large modern mammals.

=== Psittacosaurus ===
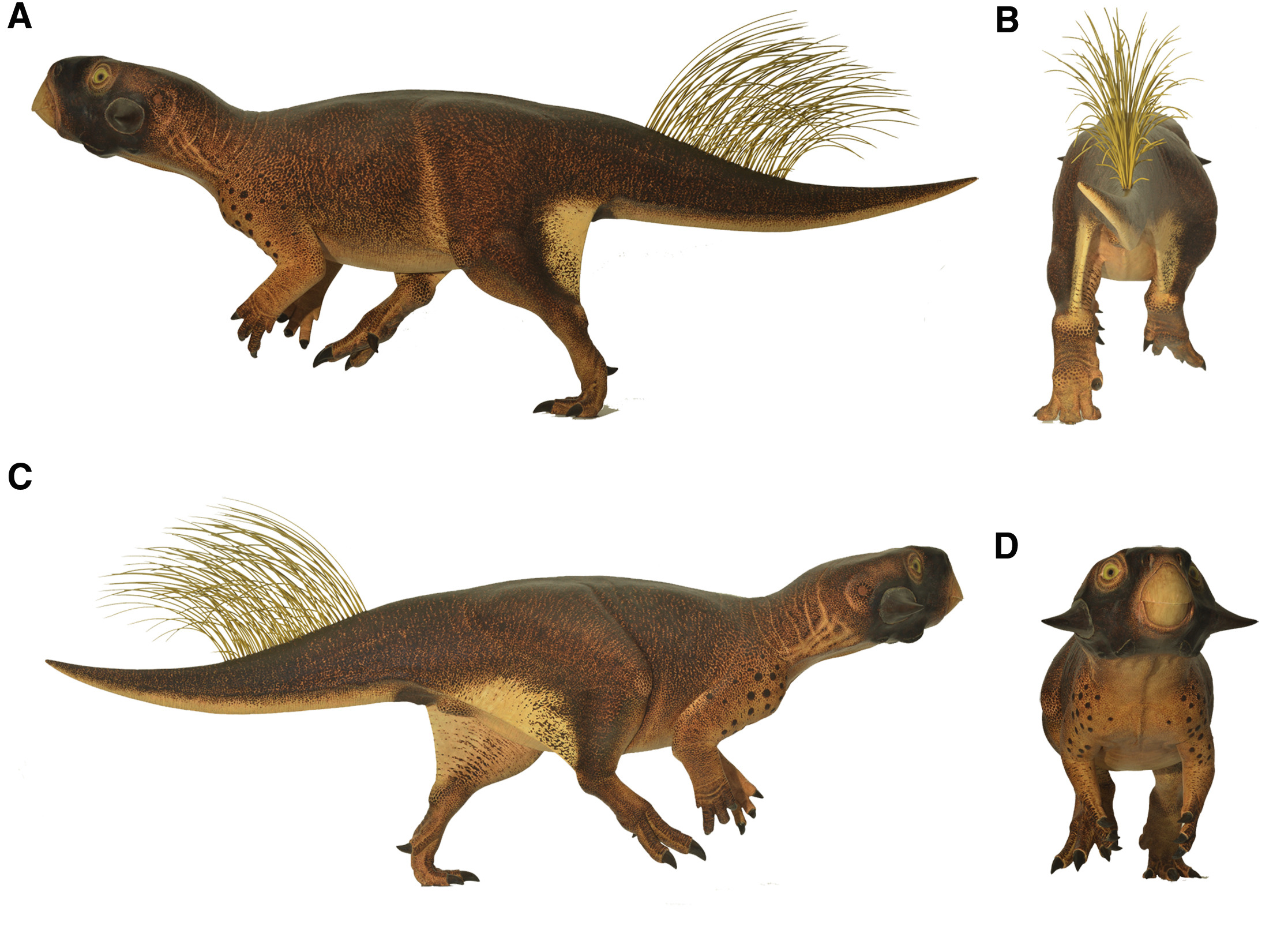
Model of Psittacosaurus (SMF R 4970) with likely colours and patterns

In 2016, examination of melanosomes preserved in the integument of a specimen of Psittacosaurus sp. indicated that the animal was countershaded, with stripes and spots on the limbs for disruptive coloration. This is similar to that of many modern species of forest-dwelling deer and antelope and may be due to a preference for a densely forested habitat with low light. The specimen also had dense clusters of pigment on its shoulders, face (possibly for display), and cloaca (which may have had an antimicrobial function).

=== Diplodocus ===
In 2025, Gallagher et al. reported the first documented evidence of melanosomes preserved in the fossilized integument of a sauropod, probably attributable to a juvenile Diplodocus, from the Mother's Day Quarry in the Morrison Formation of Montana. The morphology and distribution of these melanosomes suggest that these individuals may have exhibited non-uniform skin coloration, possibly with a mottled appearance and darker pigmentation consistent with tones ranging from gray to brown or black. However, a response to this paper in 2026 questioned the methodology of this study.

== Eggs ==
Modern birds often have coloured eggshells, with pigments protoporphyrin IX giving rise to a red-brown colour, and biliverdin giving a blue-green colour. Other amniotes, including crocodylians, do not have coloured eggshells. Traces of pigmentation have been discovered in the eggs of several eumaniraptoran dinosaur eggs, but have not been found in eggs of sauropods or hadrosaurs. A 2018 study by Wiemann et al. argued on this basis that coloured eggs had a single evolutionary origin within eumaniraptora. This finding was disputed by Shawkey and Alba (2019) as inconclusive because trace amounts of pigmentation are found in white eggshells too, and therefore the preservation of pigments does not automatically indicate that an egg was coloured. In their view, with the exception of the eggs referred to Heyuannia, there is not compelling evidence for coloration in dinosaur eggs. They argued that egg pigmentation probably has an earlier origin in archosauria, because even though crocodylian eggshells are white, they have been found to contain trace amounts of protoporphyrin.

=== Macroolithus ===
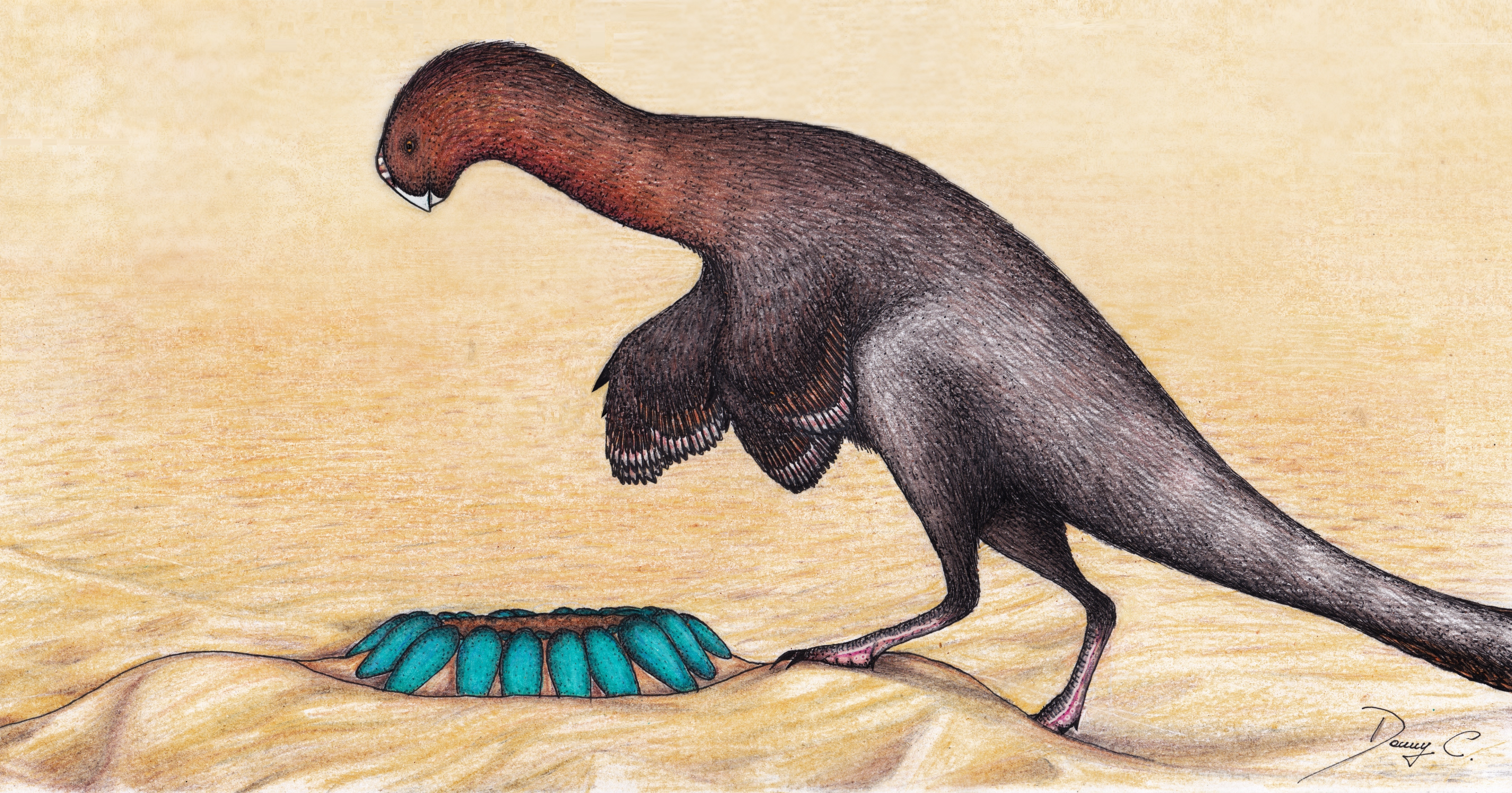
Life restoration of Heyuannia and nest, showing the blue-green coloration of the dinosaur's eggs. The colour of Heyuannia itself is not known.

Some exceptionally well-preserved oviraptorid eggs, classified in the oospecies Macroolithus yaotunensis and thought to be laid by Heyuannia based on embryonic remains, preserve both biliverdin and protoporphyrin in substantial amounts. Most likely, the eggs were blue-green in life, but taphonomic effects prevent reconstruction of the exact hue. This coloration may have served to camouflage the eggs, which were laid in open or partially-covered nests on the ground.
