= Laputavis =

Laputavis Temporal range: Ypresian

Scientific classification
- Kingdom: Animalia
- Phylum: Chordata
- Class: Aves
- Clade: Strisores
- Order: Apodiformes
- Genus: †Laputavis
- Species: †L. robusta

Binomial name
- †Laputavis robusta Dyke, 2001

Extinct genus of birds

Laputavis is an extinct genus of apodiform dinosaur that lived during the Ypresian stage of the Eocene epoch.

== Distribution ==
Laputavis robusta is known from the London Clay Formation of England.
