= Eurotrochilus =

Eurotrochilus Temporal range: Early Oligocene, 34–28 Ma

Scientific classification
- Kingdom: Animalia
- Phylum: Chordata
- Class: Aves
- Order: Apodiformes
- Family: Trochilidae
- Genus: †Eurotrochilus; Mayr, 2004

Type species
- E. inexpectatus

Species
- †E. inexpectatus Mayr, 2004; †E. noniewiczi Bochenski, 2007

Extinct genus of birds

Eurotrochilus is an extinct genus of stem group hummingbirds (Trochilidae) and are the closest known relatives of the crown group Trochilidae. Despite Eurotrochilus being morphologically very similar to modern hummingbirds, they still retained several primitive features and are not closely related to any specific extant hummingbird in the crown group. There are currently two described species of Eurotrochilus: E. inexpectatus and E. noniewiczi.

Eurotrochilus has been dated back to the Rupelian age of the early Oligocene era, which occurred during the Paleogene period. While there is some debate over exactly when Eurotrochilus was present, the most recent estimate is suggested to be 28 to 34 million years ago.

The discovery of Eurotrochilus fossils in Germany, France, and Poland was extremely important because today all 328 of the extant species of hummingbirds only occur in the New World but the fossils of Eurotrochilus suggest an Old World origin. Extant hummingbirds are distinctly different than all other avians because of their unique adaptations for hovering flight and nectarivory. Like extant hummingbirds, Eurotrochilus has these adaptations and are the only genus of stem group Trochilidae to do so.

== Etymology ==
The generic epithet Eurotrochilus is derived from the location and family of the fossils found; Euro referring to Europe, the continent where the holotype specimen was found, and Trochilus referring to the type genus of Trochilidae. The specific epithet of E. inexpectatus is Latin for "unexpected", indicative of the surprise felt by Gerald Mayr and his team when they discovered a modern-type fossil hummingbird in Europe. The name of the second species, E. noniewiczi, refers to the surname of the private collector, Edward Noniewicza, who found the fossil specimen.

== Description and paleobiology ==
Eurotrochilus specimens are some of the smallest fossil birds and are referred to the order Apodiformes due to their strongly abbreviated humeri and ulnae. They are most similar to another early Oligocene member of the stem-group Trochilidae, Jungornis. Both Eurotrochilus and Jungornis have morphological adaptations for sustained hovering flight, a characteristic of extant hummingbirds, including the Apodiform synapomorphy (abbreviated ulna and humerus) as well as pronounced distal protrusions on the humeral heads. These adaptations in Eurotrochilus are more pronounced though. Another difference is that Eurotrochilus have elongated beaks (unknown in Jungornis), which is evidence of nectarivory, the ability to consume nectar from flowers. Eurotrochilus are believed to be the first members of stem group Trochilidae to be able to perform nectarivory.

Eurotrochilus are more closely related to crown group Trochilidae than other members of stem group Trochilidae, like Jungornis, because of their specific adaptations for both nectarivory and hovering flight.

=== Nectarivory adaptations ===
In some species of Eurotrochilus, the skull and beak have been roughly measured to be 34 millimeters. The beaks of Eurotrochilus are greatly elongated, straight, and narrow, measuring from 15.5 to 20 millimeters in length, roughly 2.5 times as long as the cranium. This beak shape is distinctly different than other known beak shapes of early Tertiary stem-group hummingbirds, which were short, wide, and most likely used for eating insects as opposed to nectar.

The maxillary processes of the palatine bones in the beaks of Eurotrochilus are widely separated, indicating the presence of rhynchokinesis, or the ability to flex the upper beak. In addition, Eurotrochilus appear to have long nasal openings and large hyoid bones. The large hyoid bones are thought to support a long protractile tongue, which extant hummingbirds use to lap up nectar.

All of these adaptations made it possible for Eurotrochilus to consume nectar from ornithophilous flowers, its main source of nutrients, and to pollinate these flowers as well.

=== Hovering flight adaptations ===
Hummingbirds have specific morphological adaptations that enable them to fly forwards, backwards, sideways as well as hover for extended periods of time. Hovering flight specifically is supported in Eurotrochilus by abbreviated ulnae and humeri and developed humeral protrusions.

The ulna of Eurotrochilus measures between 6.7 and 8.8 millimeters, which is shorter than the ulna of Jungornis, which measures 13 millimeters. While Jungornis and Eurotrochilus both have abbreviated ulnas, the extreme abbreviation in Eurotrochilus supports monophyly of the clade that includes only Eurotrochilus and crown-group Trochilidae. Another synapomorphy of Eurotrochilus and crown-group Trochilidae includes the presence of deep fossae, or depressions, on the caudal surface of the proximal end of the ulnae.

The humeri of Eurotrochilus have been measured to be between 6.0 and 6.5 millimeters. It is considered short and stout when compared to other Apodiformes, except extant hummingbirds. In addition, the humeri have a wide proximal articular part and there are pronounced distal protrusions on the caput humeri, which is a synapomorphy of Jungornis, Eurotrochilus, and crown group Trochilidae. The humeral protrusions in Eurotrochilus are significantly more marked than in Jungornis and are more similar to Trochilidae. These morphological specializations of the humeri allow the bone to rotate during hovering flight.

Additional adaptations present for hovering flight in both groups include curved and relatively short wings, square-shaped tails, and a column-like sternal end of the coracoid with a convex dorsal surface.

=== Primitive features ===
Despite the similarities between the two, crown group Trochilidae has a more derived morphology than Eurotrochilus, showing Eurotrochilus to be a stem group representative. These more primitive morphologies in Eurotrochilus include the bones of the hand (carpometacarpus and distal phalanges) being longer than the ulna, the carpometacarpus lacking a dentiform process, and the presence of a small intermetacarpal process. Scientists are confident though with the assignment of Eurotrochilus to stem group Trochilidae as there has been no identification of derived characteristics that would cause Eurotrochilus to be assigned to any other taxa of aves.

== Discovery and classifications ==
Six Eurotrochilus specimens have been identified in three countries of central Europe: Germany, France, and Poland. Two species have been identified, E. inexpectatus and E. noniewiczi.

Eurotrochilus was first described by Dr. Gerald Mayr in 2004 when he found two previously unidentified tiny bird skeletons in the drawers of the Stuttgart National History Museum. The skeletons were from the former clay pit of the Bott-Eder GmbH ("Grube Unterfeld") in Wiesloch-Frauenweiler of Southern Germany. One partially disarticulated skeleton is the holotype for the species Eurotrochilus inexpectatus and the other specimen consists of two slabs of a partially disarticulated skeleton.

The discovery of the fossil hummingbird Eurotrochilus inexpectatus was a significant discovery because it provided the most convincing evidence for the presence of modern-looking hummingbirds of stem-group Trochilidae in the Old World. Previously, the oldest fossil hummingbirds capable of hovering flight and nectarivory were modern hummingbirds estimated to be 10,000-30,000 years old from the Quaternary Period found in cave deposits of Central and South America. While extant hummingbirds in crown-group Trochilidae most likely originated in the new world, the discovery of Eurotrochilus broadens the evolutionary history of modern hummingbirds.

In 2006, Dr. Gerald Mayr again described a previously unidentified specimen of Eurotrochilus inexpectatus from the same clay pit in Southern Germany. This specimen was found by Anette and Harald Oechsler in 1994 and was identified by Mayr as the second slab of the Eurotrochilus inexpectatus holotype. Also, Mayr described another skeleton from the same area that included the skull, some vertebrae, part of the pectoral girdle, and an incomplete left wing that was found by several students in 2005.

In 2007, Dr. Antoine Louchart described a specimen found in the Le Grand Banc Strata in southeastern France that consisted of an almost complete skeleton on a slab. The skeleton is in ventral view with the head in left lateral view. This specimen is unique because it preserves almost the complete skeleton, and also a thin layer of dark organic matter preserved the complete feathering pattern of the bird. The specimen had all of the synapomorphies and adaptations identified in E. inexpectatus but Louchart could not identify the specimen as E. inexpectatus because of differences in lengths of several bones including phalanges of wings and lateral process of coracoid. He did note though that the differences could be attributed to either sexual or individual distinctness, rather than speciation.

The Eurotrochilus sp. specimen found in France not only revealed more characteristics of the genus Eurotrochilus but also extended the known geographical distribution of Eurotrochilus.

The geographical distribution of Eurotrochilus was extended even further in 2007 when Dr. Zygmunt Bochenski and Dr. Zbigniew M. Bochenski described another specimen at Winnica, Świętokrzyskie Voivodeship, east of Jaslo in Southeastern Poland in the Menilite formation. The specimen was a slab and counter slab of a near-complete skeleton formerly kept in the private collection of Edward Noniewicz. The specimen is the holotype for a new species of Eurotrochilus, E. noniewiczi. The specimen had all of the same characteristics of E. inexpectatus but also had unique proportions of bones, a coracoid that widens near the sternal end, and a distinctly smaller ulna and humerus compared to E. inexpectatus and Louchart's Eurotrochilus specimen, prompting the description of a new species.

In 2009, Harald and Annette Oechsler found the fourth specimen of Eurotrochilus inexpectatus in the former clay pit of the Bott-Eder GmbH ("Grube Unterfeld") in Wiesloch-Frauenweiler of Southern Germany. Mayr described the jumbled but closely associated specimen in 2010. It offered insight into previously unknown osteological features including a developed processus intermetacaroalis and the presence of crista deltopectoralis on the humerus.

== Geologic and paleoenvironment information ==
The paleoenvironment of Eurotrochilus species occurred during the Rupelian age of the early Oligocene era. All of the specimens of Eurotrochilus found throughout Central Europe seem to agree with this geological era: German specimens are estimated to be 32 million years old, the French specimen is estimated to be 28-34 million years old, and Polish specimens are estimated to be 31 million years old.

During the Oligocene era, the Paratethys Ocean covered the majority of Central and Eastern Europe. The Winnica site in Poland where the E. noniewiczi specimen was found used to be submerged in the Paratethys Ocean. The Winnica site produced a large diversity of bird remains, aquatic and terrestrial, which indicates that there was most likely a coastal or shoreline climate with rich avifauna present. E. inexpectatus and a large diversity of other avian specimens from clay pits in Southern Germany were also found in marine sediment, supporting the theory that the majority of Central Europe most likely had a marine/coastal ecosystem.

Based on the other species found alongside all the Eurotrochilus specimens, the local climate is believed to have been sub-tropical to tropical. The warm, frost-free climate would have supported broad-leaved evergreen forests as well as palm-rich coastal forests on sandy soils. It is difficult to estimate the winter conditions during this period without knowing the migratory habits of the avian species but based on their fruit and nectar diets, scientists believe that this area of Europe most likely experienced mild winters.

== Co-evolution of ornithophilous flowers and extinction ==
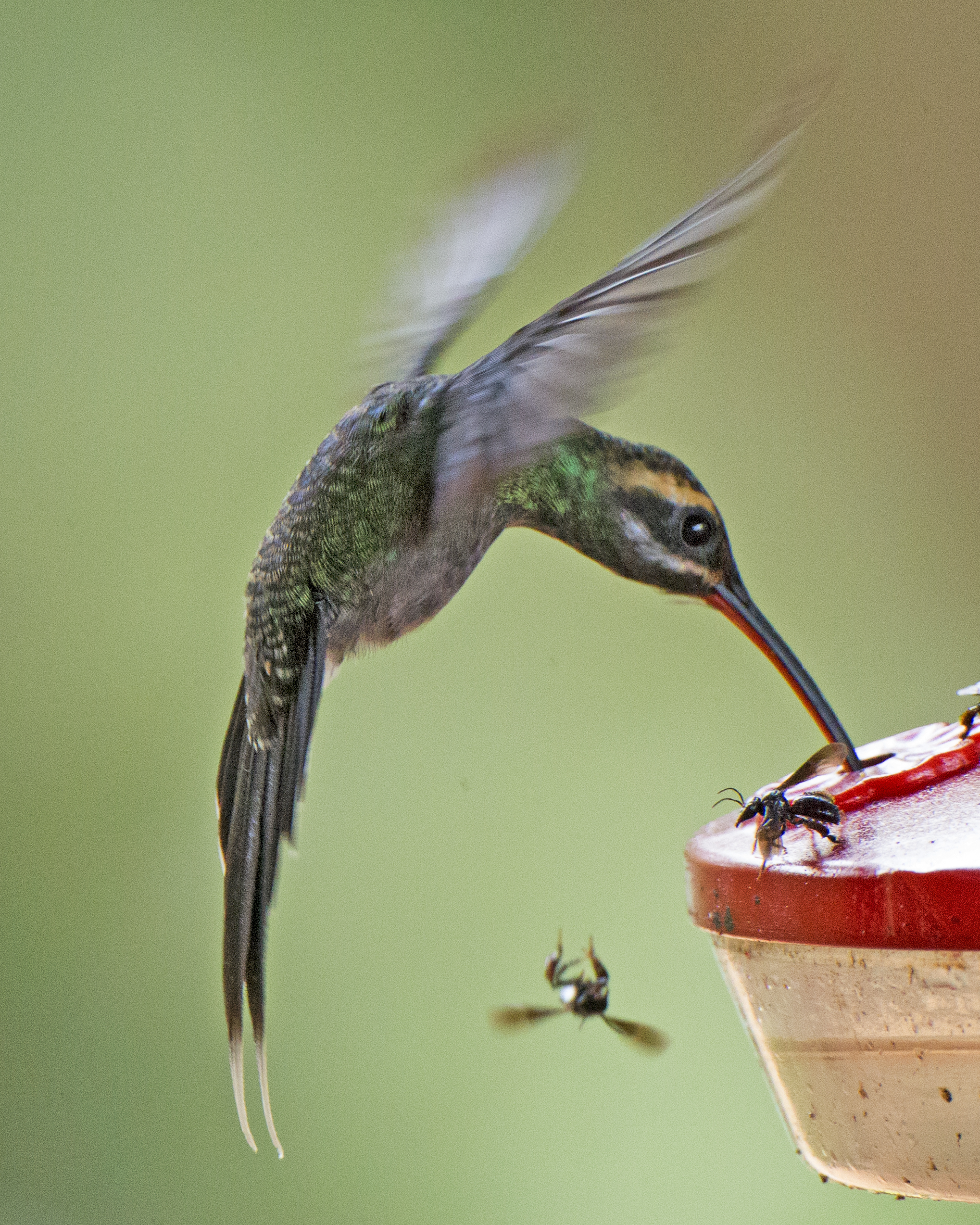
Modern hummingbird demonstrating hovering flight while consuming nectar

Ornithophilous flowers, or flowers pollinated by birds, are present in the Old World. Flowers like Canarina eminii (Campanulacea), Impatiens sakeriana (Balasaminaceae), and Agapetes spp (Ericaceae) are similar in morphology to flowers with nectar from the New World and they specifically lack a perch for birds. In the New World, similar flowers are pollinated by modern hummingbirds that do not need to perch on flowers due to their adaptation for hovering flight. Modern hummingbirds are not present in the Old World and instead long-tongued bees pollinate these flowers.

Considering that Eurotrochilus had long beaks and tongues to consume nectar as well as the ability to hover while in flight, it seems plausible to conclude that ornithophilous flowers in the Old World evolved bird-pollination morphologies in response to Eurotrochilus. If this were true, then it would suggest a maximum age for hummingbird-pollinated plants (i.e. nectivorous plants) as these plants would not be able to be pollinated before the early Oligocene without Eurotrochilus.

The abundance of E. inexpectatus specimens at the Frauenweiler site in Southern Germany suggests that Eurotrochilus were possibly locally abundant during the early Oligocene, making them the most likely dominant pollinators of ornithophilous flowers. Ecological competition with long-tongued bees for ornithophilous flowers is a suggested explanation for the extinction of Eurotrochilus and modern hummingbirds in Europe. Another possible explanation for their extinction is rapid climate change from the suspected moderate tropical climate, which would have been a critical problem considering the small size of Eurotrochilus.
