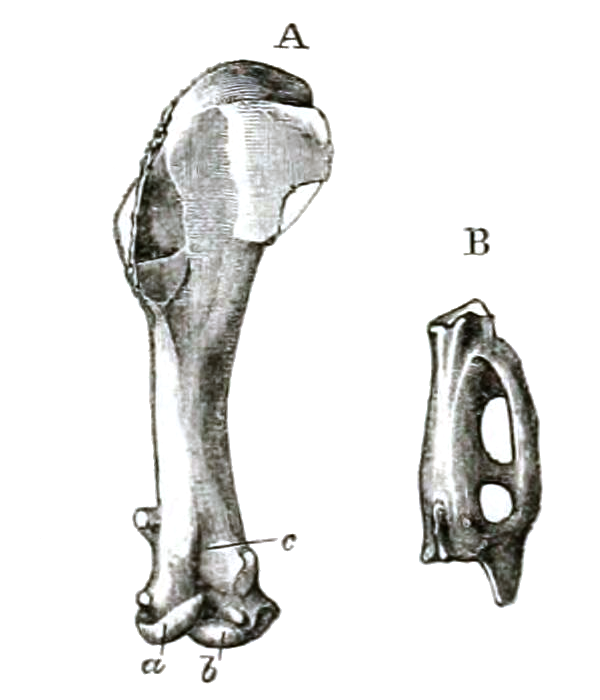
- Aegialornis gallicus

Scientific classification
- Kingdom: Animalia
- Phylum: Chordata
- Class: Aves
- Clade: Strisores
- Order: Apodiformes
- Family: †Aegialornithidae; Lydekker, 1891
- Genus: †Aegialornis; Lydekker, 1891

Species
- Aegialornis gallicus (type); Aegialornis leenhardti (disputed); Aegialornis wetmorei Aegialornis broweri (disputed); Aegialornis germanicus (disputed)

Synonyms
- Tachyornis Milne-Edwards, 1892; Belornis Milne-Edwards, 1893; Mesogiornis Mlíkovský, 2002

= Aegialornis =

Aegialornis Temporal range: Early? - Late Eocene

Extinct genus of birds

Aegialornis is a genus of prehistoric apodiform birds. It formed a distinct family, the Aegialornithidae, and was in some ways intermediate between modern swifts and owlet-nightjars, lacking the more extreme adaptations to an aerial lifestyle that swifts show today, but already having sickle-shaped wings like them. They do not appear to be a direct ancestor of modern swifts, however, but rather a group that retained an overall basal morphology. Altogether, they were not too dissimilar from modern treeswifts.

Fossils of Aegialornis have been found in Middle to Late Eocene deposits of Germany and France. An Early Eocene record from the Nanjemoy Formation of Virginia, United States (USNM 496384) is very doubtful, as apodiform birds seem not to have occurred there until after the Eocene. This bone might more properly belong to the Parvicuculidae. The taxonomy of the species is quite convoluted, with both the smaller A. germanicus and the larger A. leenhardti being sometimes considered junior synonyms of A. gallicus, which in turn is sometimes erroneously assumed to be identical to Cypselavus gallicus. Similarly, A. broweri is occasionally considered to be based on small individuals of A. wetmorei, and these latter two taxa were recently separated as genus Mesogiornis (Mlíkovský, 2002); this does not appear to have found general acceptance however. The presumed species Aegialornis szarskii is now placed in Scaniacypselus.

Which genera apart from the present one should be included in the Aegialornithidae is not quite certain. Primapus belongs either here or is a basal true swift, and Cypselavus is either an aegialornithid or a treeswift. The latter group is sometimes controversially included in the Aegialornithidae, as are the Jungornithidae, another prehistoric apodiform family that was somewhat intermediate between treeswifts and hummingbirds.
