= Eocypselus =

Eocypselus Temporal range: Early Eocene

Scientific classification
- Kingdom: Animalia
- Phylum: Chordata
- Class: Aves
- Order: Apodiformes
- Family: †Eocypselidae
- Genus: †Eocypselus; Harrison, 1984

Type species
- †Eocypselus vincenti Harrison, 1984

Other species
- †E. geminus Mayr & Kitchener, 2024; †E. grandissimus Mayr & Kitchener, 2024; †E. paulomajor Mayr & Kitchener, 2024; †E. rowei Ksepka et al., 2013

Genus of fossil birds

Eocypselus is a genus of prehistoric birds related to modern hummingbirds and swifts. Five species of Eocypselus are currently known. Compared with modern apodiforms, it may have been a better percher with shorter wing feathers, and it might have been nocturnal.

== History and species ==
Fossils of E. vincenti, the Eocypselus type species (comprising a wing and pectoral bone) were initially recognized from the London Clay Formation of England and named by C.J.O. Harrison in 1984. An additional specimen of this species was later identified from the Fur Formation of Denmark and described in 2010.

A second Eocypselus species, E. rowei was described in 2013 by Ksepka and colleagues. The collected an exceptionally preserved specimen in the Green River Formation of Wyoming. The specimen includes well-preserved feathers containing fossilized melanosomes—pigmentation cell structures—and a nearly complete skeleton. They named the new species in honor of John Rowe, Chairman of the Field Museum's Board of Trustees. The discoverers chose to honor Rowe, whom they considered to be a "fossil geek."

In 2024, Mayr and Kitchener described three additional species. The first, E. geminus (from the Latin geminus, meaning "twin", due to the specimen's similarity to E. vincenti) is known from several bones collected in 1991 and 1992 likely belonging to multiple individuals. The second, E. paulomajor (from the Latin paulum major, meaning "somewhat larger", as the specimen is slightly larger than E. vincenti), is known from a partial furcula and the left coracoid and ulna collected in 1997. The third, E. grandissimus (from the Latin grandis, since it is the largest Eocypselus species), is known from several bones collected in 1994. All of the specimens were collected by Michael Daniels from the Walton Member of the London Clay Formation.

== Description ==
Eocypselus shares features in common with both hummingbirds and swifts, leading Ksepka to declare that it "represents the closest we've gotten to the point where swifts and hummingbirds went their separate ways". It was probably not a hoverer, like a hummingbird, but also not a fast flyer like a swift. E. rowei was less than 5 in (13 cm) from head to tail. Its feathers made up more than half the size of its wingspan. The bird was small enough to fit into the palm of a hand and weighed less than 1 ounce (28 g). It probably had black plumage and may have had an iridescent sheen, like modern swifts.

== Classification ==
Eocypselus is a basal form of the order Apodiformes, which traditionally includes hummingbirds, tree swifts, and swifts.

== See also ==
- Dinosaur coloration
