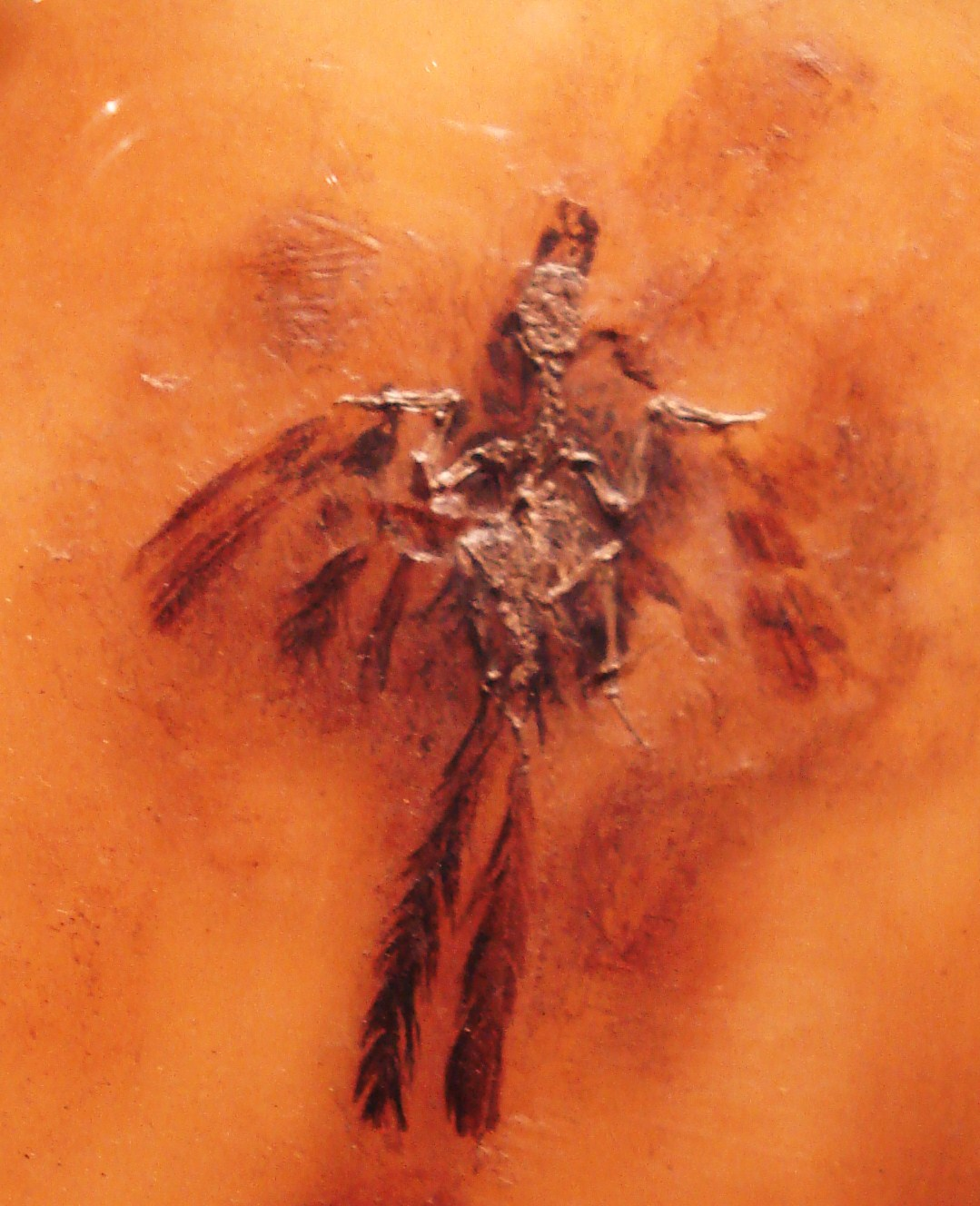
- Parargornis fossil

Scientific classification
- Kingdom: Animalia
- Phylum: Chordata
- Class: Aves
- Order: Apodiformes
- Family: Trochilidae
- Genus: †Parargornis

Type species
- Parargornis messelensis Mayr, 2003

= Parargornis =

Parargornis is an extinct genus of hummingbirds, found in Europe in the Middle Eocene.

== Description ==
Parargornis is described as having a swift-life beak, short, rounded wings, and a long tail. It is thought to be an insectivore.

== Fossil discovery ==
The first fossils, holotype specimens HLMD Be 163 and 193, were found in the Messel pit at Messel, Germany.
