= Journal of Analytical Atomic Spectrometry =

- Discipline: Analytical chemistry
- Language: English
- Edited by: Heidi Goenaga-Infante

Publication details
- History: 1986-present
- Publisher: Royal Society of Chemistry (United Kingdom)
- Frequency: Monthly
- Impact factor: 4.351 (2021)

Standard abbreviations
- ISO 4: J. Anal. At. Spectrom.

Indexing
- CODEN: JASPE2
- ISSN: 0267-9477 (print); 1364-5544 (web)

Links
- Journal homepage

The Journal of Analytical Atomic Spectrometry is a peer-reviewed scientific journal publishing original (primary) research and review articles covering all areas of modern spectrometry including fundamental theory, practice and analytical applications. It is published monthly by the Royal Society of Chemistry, the editor-in-chief is May Copsey. The journal replaced Annual Reports on Analytical Atomic Spectroscopy (1971–1984) in 1986 and has a 2021 impact factor of 4.351. The current editor-in-chief is Heidi Goenaga-Infante (LGC).

== Article types ==
The journal publishes research papers, technical notes, urgent communications, and review articles.
