= Primapus =

Primapus Temporal range: Early Eocene

Scientific classification
- Kingdom: Animalia
- Phylum: Chordata
- Class: Aves
- Order: Apodiformes
- Family: †Aegialornithidae
- Genus: †Primapus; Harrison and Walker, 1975

Species
- P. lacki Harrison and Walker, 1975 (type)

Extinct genus of birds

Primapus is an extinct genus of apodiform bird from the Early Eocene of the United Kingdom. Its fossils were found in the London Clay, which was deposited around 50 million years ago. The type species is P. lacki.

== Sources ==
- Fossils (Smithsonian Handbooks) by David Ward (page 262)
