= Wymysłów, Gmina Połaniec =

Wymysłów
- Village
- Location within Poland
- Coordinates: 50°27′29″N 21°15′32″E
- Country: Poland
- Voivodeship: Świętokrzyskie
- County: Staszów
- Gmina: Połaniec
- Sołectwo: Wymysłów
- Elevation: 164.9 m (541 ft)
- Population: 90
- Time zone: UTC+1 (CET)
  - Summer (DST): UTC+2 (CEST)
- Postal code: 28-230
- Area code: +48 15
- Car plates: TSZ

Wymysłów [vɨˈmɨswuf] (until December 31, 2005, with type of settlement as of hamlet of village of Rudniki) is a village in the administrative district of Gmina Połaniec, within Staszów County, Świętokrzyskie Voivodeship, in south-central Poland. It lies approximately 4 km (2 mi) north-west of Połaniec, 14 km (9 mi) south-east of Staszów, and 66 km (41 mi) south-east of the regional capital Kielce.
