= Zrębin =

- Village
- Location within Poland
- Coordinates: 50°26′32″N 21°14′08″E
- Country: Poland
- Voivodeship: Świętokrzyskie
- County: Staszów
- Gmina: Połaniec
- Sołectwo: Zrębin
- Elevation: 170.9 m (561 ft)

Population (31 December 2009 at Census)
  - Total: ▲395
- Time zone: UTC+1 (CET)
  - Summer (DST): UTC+2 (CEST)
- Postal code: 28-230
- Area code: +48 15
- Car plates: TSZ

Zrębin [ˈzrɛmbin] is a village in the administrative district of Gmina Połaniec, within Staszów County, Świętokrzyskie Voivodeship, in south-central Poland. It lies approximately 4 km (2 mi) west of Połaniec, 15 km (9 mi) south of Staszów, and 66 km (41 mi) south-east of the regional capital Kielce.

On the night of 24–25 December 1976, one of the most notorious murders of the Polish communist period took place in Zrębin, dubbed "the Połaniec case".
