= Mohylów =

Mohylów may refer to:

- Mogilev, a city in eastern Belarus,
- Mohyliv-Podilskyi, a city in Ukraine
