= Luszyca =

- Village
- Location within Poland
- Coordinates: 50°27′38″N 21°19′37″E
- Country: Poland
- Voivodeship: Świętokrzyskie
- County: Staszów
- Gmina: Połaniec
- Sołectwo: Okrągła
- Elevation: 178.7 m (586 ft)

Population (31 December 2009 at Census)
  - Total: ▼28
- Time zone: UTC+1 (CET)
  - Summer (DST): UTC+2 (CEST)
- Postal code: 28-230
- Area code: +48 15
- Car plates: TSZ

Luszyca [luˈʂɨt͡sa] is a village in the administrative district of Gmina Połaniec, within Staszów County, Świętokrzyskie Voivodeship in south-central Poland. It lies approximately 4 km (2 mi) north-east of Połaniec, 16 km (10 mi) south-east of Staszów, and 69 km (43 mi) south-east of the regional capital Kielce.
