= Łęg, Gmina Połaniec =

Łęg
- Village
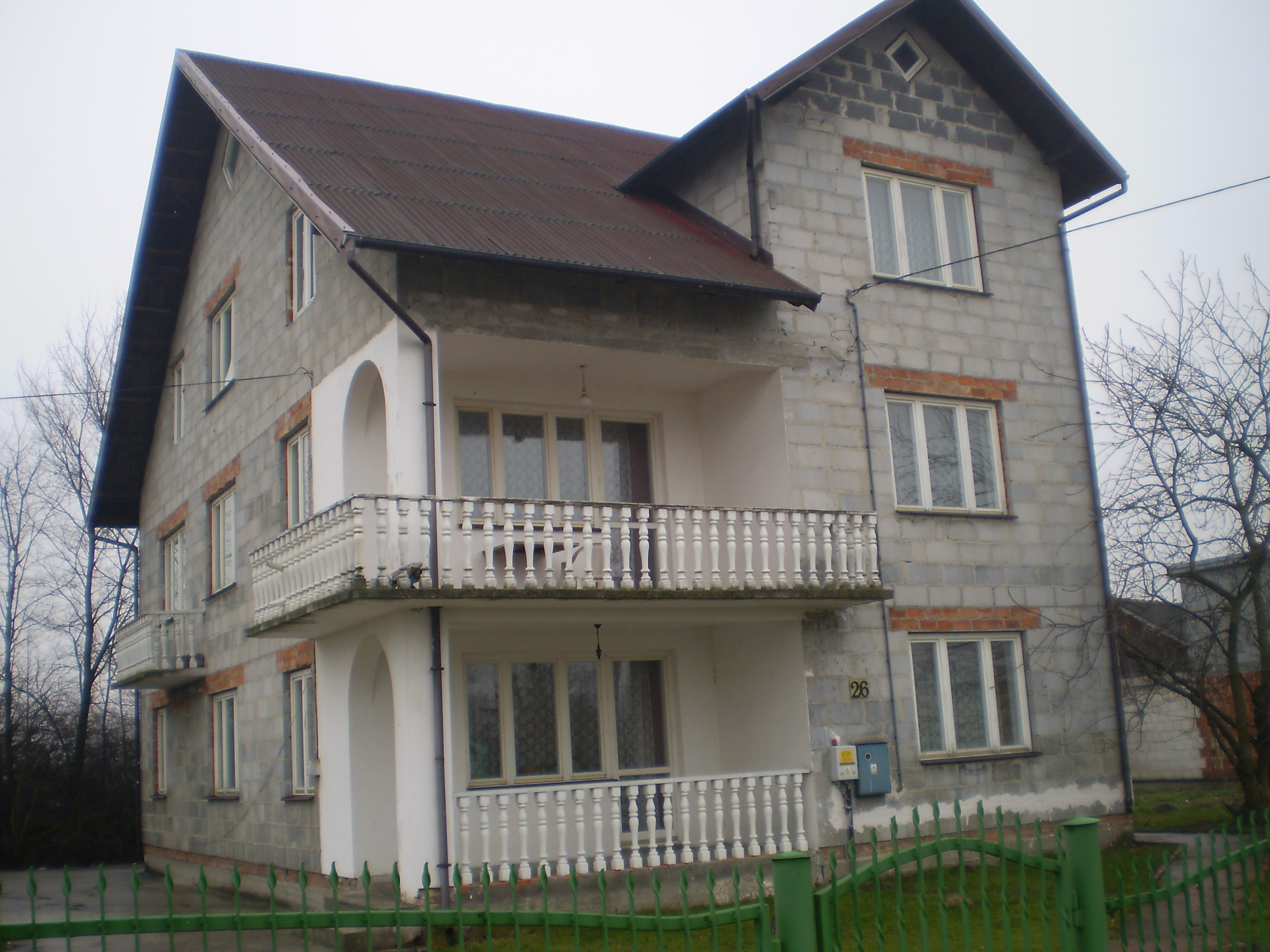

- Location within Poland
- Coordinates: 50°26′06″N 21°18′38″E
- Country: Poland
- Voivodeship: Świętokrzyskie
- County: Staszów
- Gmina: Połaniec
- Sołectwo: Łęg-Zawada
- Elevation: 157.3 m (516 ft)

Population (31 December 2009 at Census)
  - Total: ▼231
- Time zone: UTC+1 (CET)
  - Summer (DST): UTC+2 (CEST)
- Postal code: 28-230
- Area code: +48 15
- Car plates: TSZ

Łęg [wɛnk] is a village in the administrative district of Gmina Połaniec, within Staszów County, Świętokrzyskie Voivodeship, in south-central Poland. It lies approximately 2 km (1 mi) east of Połaniec, 18 km (11 mi) south-east of Staszów, and 70 km (43 mi) south-east of the regional capital Kielce.
