= Ruszcza =

- Village
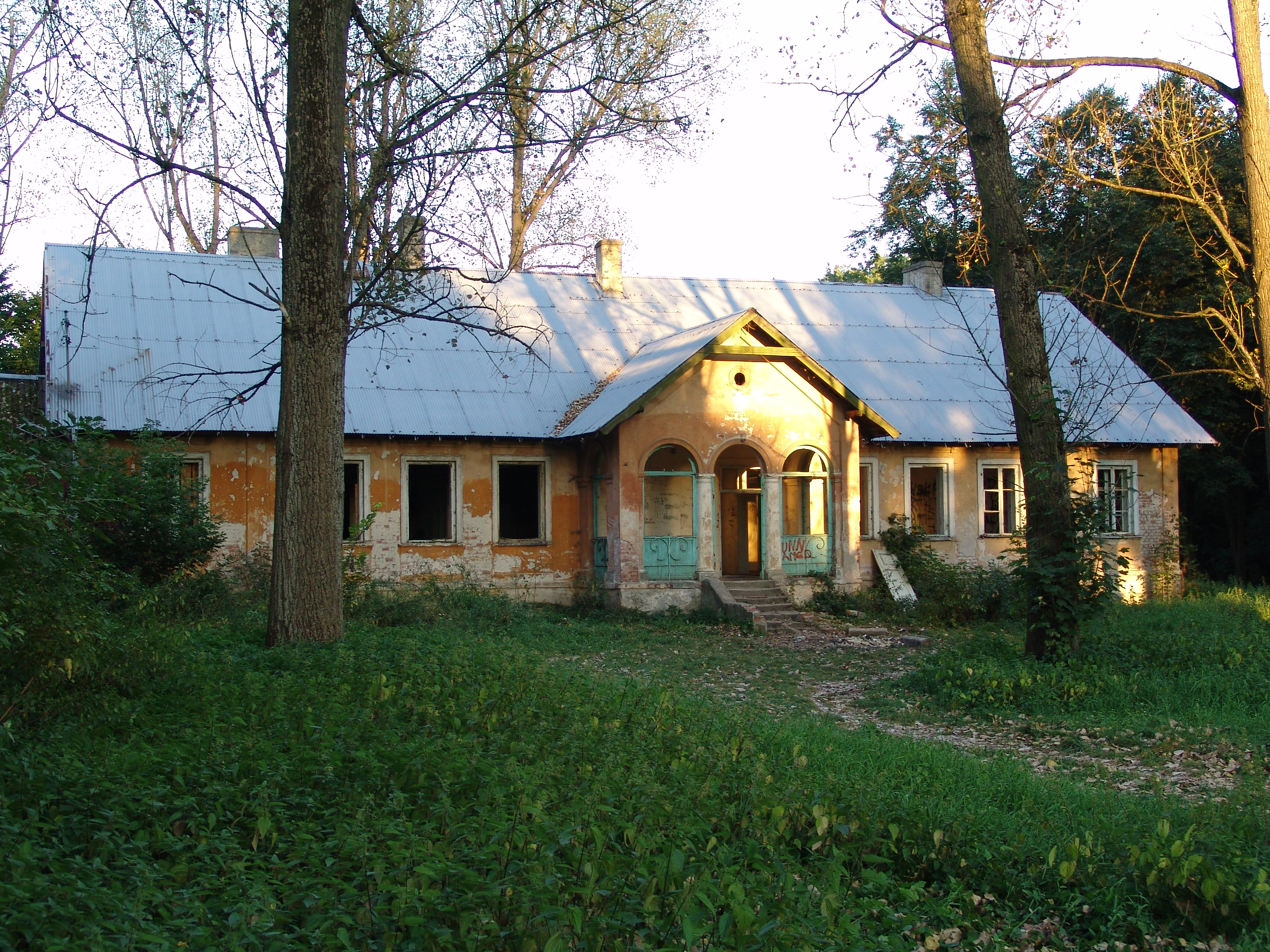

- Location within Poland
- Coordinates: 50°24′33″N 21°13′51″E
- Country: Poland
- Voivodeship: Świętokrzyskie
- County: Staszów
- Gmina: Połaniec
- Sołectwo: Ruszcza
- Elevation: 162.1 m (532 ft)

Population (31 December 2009 at Census)
  - Total: ▲642
- Time zone: UTC+1 (CET)
  - Summer (DST): UTC+2 (CEST)
- Postal code: 28-230
- Area code: +48 15
- Car plates: TSZ

Ruszcza [ˈruʂt͡ʂa] is a village in the administrative district of Gmina Połaniec, within Staszów County, Świętokrzyskie Voivodeship, in south-central Poland. It lies approximately 5 km (3 mi) south-west of Połaniec, 18 km (11 mi) south of Staszów, and 69 km (43 mi) south-east of the regional capital Kielce.
