= Kamieniec, Staszów County =

Kamieniec
- Village
- Location within Poland
- Coordinates: 50°27′05″N 21°13′47″E
- Country: Poland
- Voivodeship: Świętokrzyskie
- County: Staszów
- Gmina: Połaniec
- Sołectwo: Kamieniec
- Elevation: 161.2 m (529 ft)

Population (31 December 2009 at Census)
  - Total: ▲131
- Time zone: UTC+1 (CET)
  - Summer (DST): UTC+2 (CEST)
- Postal code: 28–230
- Area code: +48 15
- Car plates: TSZ

Kamieniec [kaˈmjɛɲɛt͡s] is a village in the administrative district of Gmina Połaniec, within Staszów County, Świętokrzyskie Voivodeship, in south-central Poland. It lies approximately 5 km (3 mi) north-west of Połaniec, 14 km (9 mi) south of Staszów, and 65 km (40 mi) south-east of the regional capital Kielce.
