= Tursko Małe-Kolonia =

- Colony
- Location within Poland
- Coordinates: 50°26′47″N 21°22′41″E
- Country: Poland
- Voivodeship: Świętokrzyskie
- County: Staszów
- Gmina: Połaniec
- Sołectwo: Tursko Małe-Kolonia
- Elevation: 153.4 m (503 ft)

Population (31 December 2009 at Census)
  - Total: ▲165
- Time zone: UTC+1 (CET)
  - Summer (DST): UTC+2 (CEST)
- Postal code: 28-230
- Area code: +48 15
- Car plates: TSZ

Tursko Małe-Kolonia [ˈturskɔ ˈmawɛ kɔˈlɔɲa] (till December 31, 2000 as Kolonia Tursko Małe with type of settlement as of colony independent) is a colony in the administrative district of Gmina Połaniec, within Staszów County, Świętokrzyskie Voivodeship, in south-central Poland. It lies approximately 6 km (4 mi) east of Połaniec, 19 km (12 mi) south-east of Staszów, and 72 km (45 mi) south-east of the regional capital Kielce.
