= Masnik =

Masnik may refer to:

- Maśnik – Village in Świętokrzyskie Voivodeship, Poland
- Boris Masník (1923–2011), Czech animator, screenwriter, director, comic book artist, and photographer
- Juan Masnik (1943–2021), Uruguayan footballer and manager

== See also ==
- Masnick
