= Zdzieci Nowe =

- Colony
- Location within Poland
- Coordinates: 50°26′09″N 21°12′39″E
- Country: Poland
- Voivodeship: Świętokrzyskie
- County: Staszów
- Gmina: Połaniec
- Sołectwo: Zdzieci Nowe
- Elevation: 196.8 m (646 ft)

Population (31 December 2009 at Census)
  - Total: ▼153
- Time zone: UTC+1 (CET)
  - Summer (DST): UTC+2 (CEST)
- Postal code: 28-230
- Area code: +48 15
- Car plates: TSZ

Zdzieci Nowe [ˈzd͡ʑɛt͡ɕi ˈnɔvɛ] (till December 31, 2000 as at Nowe Zdzieci with type of settlement as of colony independent) is a colony in the administrative district of Gmina Połaniec, within Staszów County, Świętokrzyskie Voivodeship, in south-central Poland. It lies approximately 5 km (3 mi) west of Połaniec, 15 km (9 mi) south of Staszów, and 66 km (41 mi) south-east of the regional capital Kielce.
