= Kraśnik (disambiguation) =

Kraśnik may refer to the following places:

- Kraśnik in Lublin Voivodeship (east Poland)
- Kraśnik, Świętokrzyskie Voivodeship (south-central Poland)
- Kraśnik, West Pomeranian Voivodeship (north-west Poland)
