= Połaniec case =

1976 murder in Poland

- Location: 50.441014°N 21.251829°E; Zrębin, Tarnobrzeg, Poland
- Date: 24–25 December 1976
- Target: Krystyna Łukaszek, Stanisław Łukaszek, Mieczysław Kalita
- Deaths: 3
- Perpetrators: Jan Sojda, Józef Adaś, Jerzy Socha, Stanisław Kulpiński

On the night of 24–25 December 1976, three inhabitants of the village Zrębin, Tarnobrzeg Voivodeship (now Świętokrzyskie), Poland, were murdered while walking home from a Christmas Eve mass in Połaniec. The victims were Krystyna Łukaszek (aged 18), her husband Stanisław Łukaszek (aged 25), and her brother Mieczysław Kalita (aged 12). Four men were sentenced for the murders. Two of them – Jan Sojda and Józef Adaś – were sentenced to death.

The killings are considered to be the most notorious and disturbing murder case of the Polish communist period. Perpetrators committed the crime in front of dozens of witnesses, who were later bound by a "conspiracy of silence".

== Background ==
There has been a long-lasting conflict between the Kalita and Sojda families. In 1948, Jan Roj – an ancestor of the Kalita family – helped law enforcement arrest Jan Sojda on suspicion of committing rape. Years later, Roj's son was "accidentally" shot and killed with a firearm in Sojda's backyard. The person who shot him then died in "unclear circumstances".

In 1976, members of the Sojda family were invited to the wedding of Krystyna Kalita and Stanisław Łukaszek. The sister of Jan Sojda and wife of Józef Adaś, tasked with baking the wedding cake, was accused of stealing sausage and tableware during the wedding. Jan Sojda, a wealthy farmer locally known as "The King of Zrębin", took great offense to the allegations leveled against his family. He decided to "exterminate the Kalita children" as revenge.

== Murders ==
Jan Sojda conspired to kill his victims together with his brother-in-law Józef Adaś and two sons-in-law: Jerzy Socha and Stanisław Kulpiński. The murder was planned to be committed in front of many witnesses in order to show them that Sojda would go unpunished for everything he did, and to scare them not to mess with him in the future.

On Christmas Eve, residents of Zrębin were transported to a church in Połaniec with two buses. Around thirty people decided to stay in the bus and drink vodka instead of attending the mass. Among them were Sojda and his co-conspirators, who drove to Połaniec in their car.

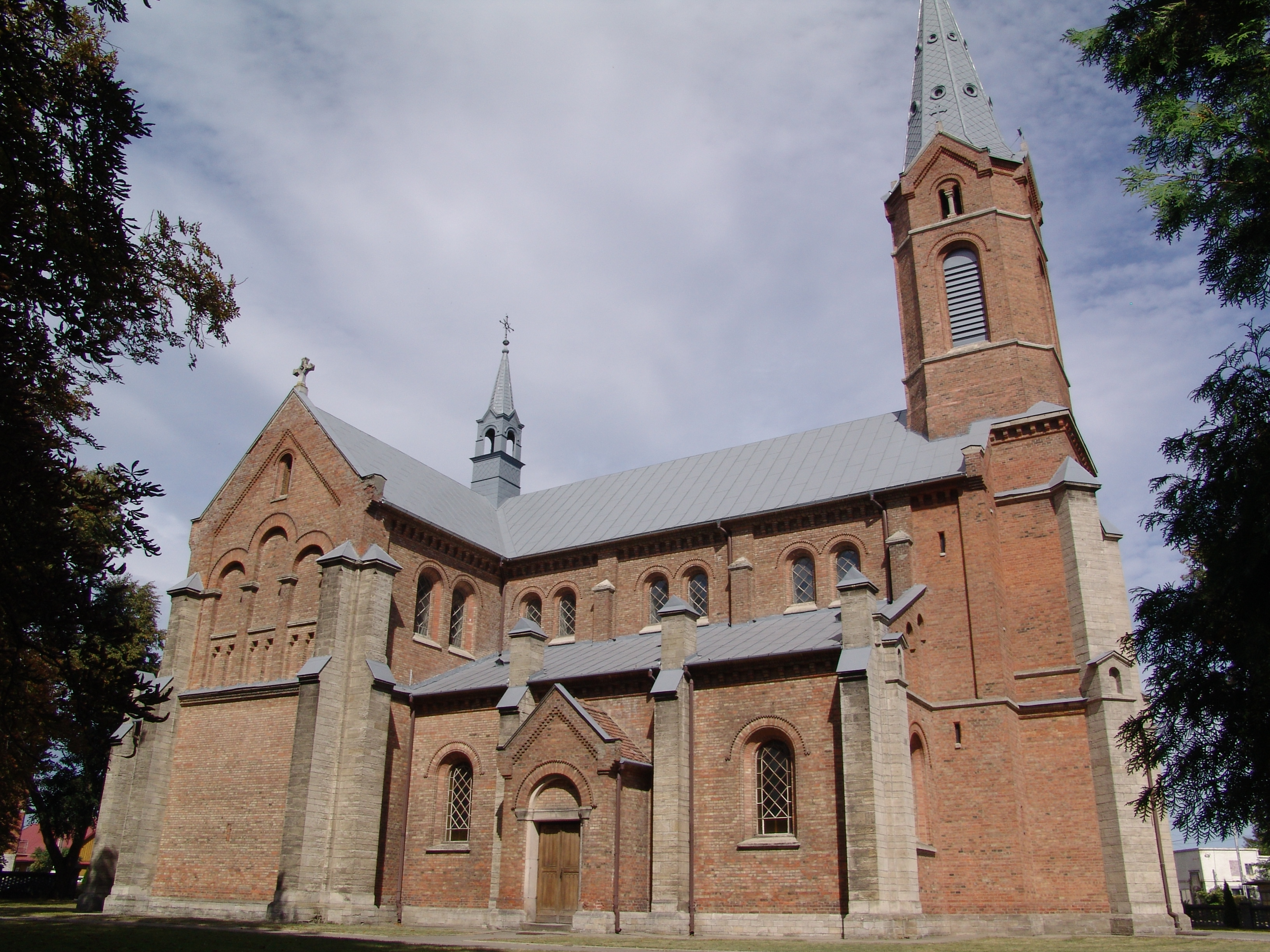
Church in Połaniec

Sojda asked Małgorzata, a cousin of the Kalita family, to lure them out of the church. She told them to go back home because their parents are fighting. Krystyna Łukaszek, her husband Stanisław, and her brother Mieczysław left the church and headed back to Zrębin. Adaś and Sojda did not let them into the bus, forcing them to walk 5 kilometres (3 mi) in heavy snow.

Once people in the bus finished all the vodka they had, they decided to drive to Zrębin for more alcohol. Jerzy Socha drove a car while Józef Adaś drove one of the buses. The second bus was driven by Maciej Wysocki, threatened into compliance by Sojda. When Socha noticed the three people walking along the road, he ran his car into the twelve-year-old Mieczysław Kalita. The two buses stopped behind the car. Sojda and Adaś attacked Krystyna and Stanisław Łukaszek with a wheel wrench and a metal bar, killing both of them. Because Mieczysław survived being struck by a car, Socha ran over him again, crushing his head. Krystyna was in her fifth month of pregnancy.

The murder was witnessed by about 30 people who were inside one of the buses. Among them were communist activists, a sołtys, and a member of the ORMO voluntary police. When some people tried to run, Stanisław Kulpiński blocked their way out and threatened to kill anyone who left the bus. Three men managed to get out of the bus, including Henryk Witek, who ran to where Sojda and Adaś were murdering Krystyna and shone a flashlight at them "out of curiosity".

After the murder, passengers of the first bus were led into the second one. Bodies of the victims were brought into the first bus. Stanisław and Mieczysław were laid into a ditch by the road and ran over by the bus to stage a traffic accident. Krystyna was stripped of her clothes and laid behind the bus to suggest that she was raped. Sojda made all the witnesses promise that they would never tell anyone about what they had seen. Everyone was ordered to kiss a rosary. Sojda then pricked their fingers and made them sign a sheet of paper with their blood. Furthermore, all witnesses were given money. Everybody was then driven either back to the church in Połaniec or to a church in Beszowa.

== Investigation ==
The case was investigated by the regional Citizens' Militia in Tarnobrzeg. The person responsible for performing the autopsy of the victims ruled their deaths as a traffic incident. Because of this, the case was initially treated as an accident. The bus involved in the killing was impounded. During the funeral of the victims, Sojda carried their coffins.

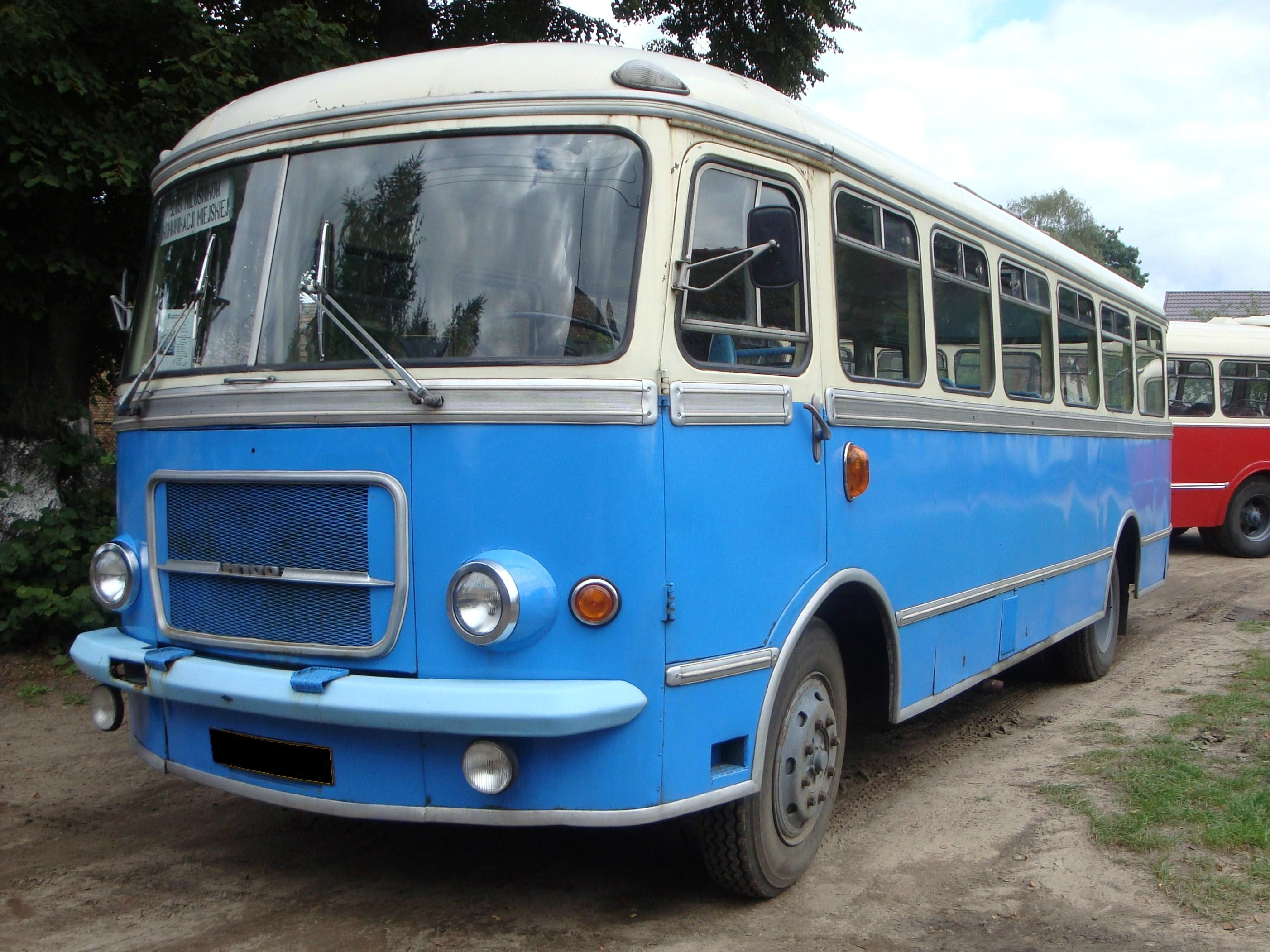
San H100 bus, similar to the one used in the killing

A few days after the murder, fourteen-year-old Stanisław Strzępek publicly accused Sojda and Adaś of being responsible for the killing. On the night of the murders, Strzępek and his two friends were walking down the road from Połaniec to Zrębin and saw Adaś next to the bus in the ditch where the bodies were. Strzępek's family was later harassed by the people of Zrębin. Their barn was burned down, and coins symbolising Judas' thirty pieces of silver were thrown through the window of their house. Stanisław's father committed suicide.

Strzępek's testimony led to the militia arresting Adaś and charging him with causing a fatal road accident. The bodies of the victims were exhumed and a second autopsy was performed. This autopsy proved that the victims were murdered. Their wounds matched a wheel brace.

In nearby Wolica, Sojda organised a meeting of his crime's witnesses to make them swear their loyalty to him again. He gifted them more money and medallions from the Jasna Góra Monastery. He was arrested three months after Adaś for obstructing the investigation. In the months that followed, Kulpiński and Socha were also arrested.

Some witnesses, no longer afraid of Sojda, started testifying. Leszek Brzdękiewicz, who along with Stanisław Strzępek pointed out Sojda and his kin as the murderers at the very beginning of the investigation, was found dead in a shallow Czarna river in Zrębin. The militia suspected the Sojda family of murdering Brzdękiewicz, but due to a lack of evidence his death was ruled as accidental drowning.

== Trial ==
The murder trial started in November 1978, led by judge Marek Maciąg in the Voivodeship Court in Sandomierz. Some witnesses, continuously threatened by the Sojda family, changed their testimonies. The judges started imposing monetary penalties on those who were lying. When this did not help, those suspected of perjury were placed under arrest. Some of them preferred spending years in prison over having to deal with Sojda. In total, 232 people were questioned. 38 of them withdrew their past testimonies, 88 were monetarily punished for perjury, and 18 were arrested. They were sentenced to up to eight years in prison.

On 10 November 1979, one year after the start of the trial, the Voivodeship Court sentenced Jan Sojda, Józef Adaś, Jerzy Socha, and Stanisław Kulpiński to death, and Henryk Witek to five years in prison. On 5 February 1982, the Supreme Court cancelled death sentences for Socha and Kulpiński, sentencing them to, respectively, 25 and 15 years in prison instead.

On 23 November 1982, Sojda and Adaś were hanged in the Montelupi Prison in Kraków.

The family of Jan Sojda and some other people of Zrębin claim that the deaths of Łukaszeks and Mieczysław Kalita were caused by a road accident. Zbigniew Dyka, defense attorney for the accused and later Minister of Justice, insisted on the innocence of Sojda.

== Legacy ==
The so-called "Połaniec case" is considered to be the most notorious murder case of communist Poland. Despite the communist government trying to cover up the case's details, it received wide coverage in the Polish mass media of the time. The murders were discussed in contemporary and modern press and books, as well as television and film productions.

Journalist Wiesław Łuka wrote a book titled Nie oświadczam się, based on his own contemporary articles about the case. Writer Roman Bratny published a novel Wśród nocnej ciszy and a theatre play based on the case.

Zmowa, a film produced in 1988, was loosely based on the Połaniec case. The case was presented in the documentary series Paragraf 148 – Kara śmierci. In the years 2025–2026, a television series about the murders was produced, titled Wśród nocnej ciszy.

In 2012, Polish black metal band Voidhanger recorded a song "Silent Night, Deadly Night (25.12.1976)", which tells of the murders.
