= Zdzieci Stare =

- Village
- Location within Poland
- Coordinates: 50°25′17″N 21°13′11″E
- Country: Poland
- Voivodeship: Świętokrzyskie
- County: Staszów
- Gmina: Połaniec
- Sołectwo: Zdzieci Stare
- Elevation: 182.6 m (599 ft)

Population (31 December 2009 at Census)
  - Total: ▲215
- Time zone: UTC+1 (CET)
  - Summer (DST): UTC+2 (CEST)
- Postal code: 28-230
- Area code: +48 15
- Car plates: TSZ

Zdzieci Stare [ˈzd͡ʑɛt͡ɕi ˈstarɛ] (till December 31, 2000 as at Stare Zdzieci) is a village in the administrative district of Gmina Połaniec, within Staszów County, Świętokrzyskie Voivodeship, in south-central Poland. It lies approximately 4 km (2 mi) west of Połaniec, 17 km (11 mi) south of Staszów, and 68 km (42 mi) south-east of the regional capital Kielce.
