= Leonid Mosendz =

Ukrainian poet and writer (1897–1948)

- Леонід Мосендз
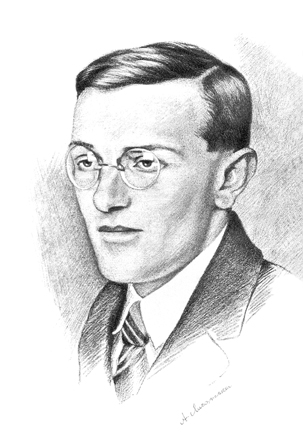
- Drawing by Alla Lysianska
- Born: 20 September 1897; Mogilyov-Podolsky, Russian Empire (now Mohyliv-Podilskyi, Ukraine)
- Died: 13 October 1948 (aged 51); Blonay, Vaud, Switzerland
- Occupations: Poet, writer

Leonid Markovych Mosendz (Ukrainian: Леоні́д Ма́ркович Мо́сендз; 20 September 1897 – 13 October 1948) was a Ukrainian poet and writer. Under the pseudonym Porfyrii Horotak, he wrote satire in collaboration with Yuriy Klen.

== Biography ==
Leonid Mosendz was born in 1897 in Mohyliv-Podilskyi, in the present-day Vinnytsia Oblast of Ukraine, the son of a government official. Between 1911 and 1915, he studied at the teachers' seminary in Vinnytsia. During the First World War he served as a soldier in the Imperial Russian Army on the Romanian Front. After demobilisation, he worked as a teacher in Hnivan and was active in the Ukrainian cultural society Prosvita until he was drafted into the Ukrainian People's Army on 4 March 1919, where he served as a senior officer. He returned to his teaching post on 26 October 1919 and taught physics and natural sciences from 1 December 1919 to April 1920.

After the demobilisation of the People's Army, he fled to Poland in 1920 but returned to Ukraine in 1921, where he again engaged in Prosvita activities in Lutsk. For this, he was arrested by the Polish authorities and interned in the camp at Kalisz. After his release in May 1922, he moved first to Częstochowa and later that year to Poděbrady in the First Czechoslovak Republic, where he studied at the chemical-technology department of the Ukrainian Academy of Economics. He graduated in 1928 as a technology engineer and became an assistant to Prof. Vasyl Ivanis (Russian: Василий Николаевич Иванис; 1888–1974). After two years of postgraduate study at the Polytechnic Institute in Brno, he became a specialist in petroleum refining and earned a doctorate in 1931. He subsequently worked as a civil engineer in Bratislava.

From 1937, he taught at a commercial school in Khust and then until 1939 in Svaliava. After the Hungarian occupation of Transcarpathia, he worked from 1939 to 1945 as a chemist in Bratislava. He joined the Legion of Ukrainian Nationalists and was part of a circle of Ukrainian writers that included Oleh Olzhych, Yevhen Malaniuk, and Yuriy Klen. In 1945, he fled to the British occupation zone of Austria and moved first to Innsbruck, then to Seefeld, and finally in December 1946 to Switzerland, where he died at the age of 51 in a tuberculosis sanatorium in Blonay. He was buried there.

Alongside his poetic and literary work, he translated English (e.g., Edgar Allan Poe), French, and German literature into Ukrainian.
