= Maśnik =

Village in Świętokrzyskie Voivodeship, Poland

- Village
- Location within Poland
- Coordinates: 50°23′29″N 21°14′55″E
- Country: Poland
- Voivodeship: Świętokrzyskie
- County: Staszów
- Gmina: Połaniec
- Sołectwo: Maśnik
- Elevation: 155.5 m (510 ft)

Population (31 December 2009 at Census)
  - Total: ▲207
- Time zone: UTC+1 (CET)
  - Summer (DST): UTC+2 (CEST)
- Postal code: 28-230
- Area code: +48 15
- Car plates: TSZ

Maśnik [ˈmaɕnik] is a village in the administrative district of Gmina Połaniec, within Staszów County, Świętokrzyskie Voivodeship, in south-central Poland. It lies approximately 6 km (4 mi) south-west of Połaniec, 20 km (12 mi) south of Staszów, and 70 km (43 mi) south-east of the regional capital Kielce.
