= Masnick =

Masnick is a surname. Notable people with the surname include:

- Mike Masnick (born 1974), American blogger
- Paul Masnick (1931–2024), Canadian ice hockey player

== See also ==
- Masnik
