= Rudniki, Staszów County =

Rudniki
- Village
- Location within Poland
- Coordinates: 50°28′01″N 21°16′28″E
- Country: Poland
- Voivodeship: Świętokrzyskie
- County: Staszów
- Gmina: Połaniec
- Sołectwo: Rudniki
- Elevation: 167 m (548 ft)

Population (31 December 2009 at Census)
  - Total: ▲420
- Time zone: UTC+1 (CET)
  - Summer (DST): UTC+2 (CEST)
- Postal code: 28-230
- Area code: +48 15
- Car plates: TSZ

Rudniki [rudˈniki] is a village in the administrative district of Gmina Połaniec, within Staszów County, Świętokrzyskie Voivodeship, in south-central Poland. It lies approximately 5 km (3 mi) north of Połaniec, 13 km (8 mi) south-east of Staszów, and 66 km (41 mi) south-east of the regional capital Kielce.
