= Gmina Połaniec =

Gmina Połaniec Połaniec Commune
- Gmina
- Flag Coat of arms

- Coordinates (Połaniec): 50°25′48.95″N 21°17′05.69″E
- Country: Poland
- Voivodeship: Świętokrzyskie
- County: Staszów
- Seat: Połaniec

Area (through the years 2006–2010)
  - Total: 75.01 km^{2} (28.96 sq mi)

Population (31 December 2010 at Census)
  - Total: 11,848
  - Density: 158.0/km^{2} (409.1/sq mi)
  - Urban: 8,227
  - Rural: 3,621
- Time zone: UTC+1 (CET)
  - Summer (DST): UTC+2 (CEST)
- Postal code: 28–230
- Area code: +48 15
- Car plates: TSZ
- Website: http://www.polaniec.pl/

Gmina Połaniec is an urban-rural gmina (administrative district) in Staszów County, Świętokrzyskie Voivodeship, in south-central Poland. Its seat is the town of Połaniec, which lies approximately 17 kilometres (11 mi) south-east of Staszów and 69 km (43 mi) south-east of the regional capital Kielce.

The gmina covers an area of 75.01 square kilometres (29.0 sq mi), and as of 2010 its total population is ▼11,848 (out of which the population of Połaniec amounts to ▼8,227, and the population of the rural part of the gmina is ▲3,621).

== Demography ==
According to the 2011 Poland census, there were 11,848 people residing in Połaniec Commune, of whom 49.8% were male and 50.2% were female (out of which the population in rural areas amounts to 3,621, of whom 50.4% were male and 49.6% were female). In the commune, the population was spread out, with 19.1% under the age of 18, 40.6% from 18 to 44, 29% from 45 to 64, and 11.2% who were 65 years of age or older (out of which the population in rural areas amounts to 20.4% under the age of 18, 40.1% from 18 to 44, 22.5% from 45 to 64, and 17.0% who were 65 years of age or older).

Table 1. Population level of commune in 2010 – by age group
SPECIFICATION					Measure unit	POPULATION (by age group in 2010)																		
SPECIFICATION					Measure unit	TOTAL	0–4	5–9	10–14	15–19	20–24	25–29	30–34	35–39	40–44	45–49	50–54	55–59	60–64	65–69	70–74	75–79	80–84	85 +
I.	TOTAL				person	11,848	621	557	640	798	1,123	1,168	831	691	654	936	1,233	952	598	257	268	221	179	121
I.	—	of which in			%	100	5.2	4.7	5.4	6.7	9.5	9.9	7	5.8	5.5	7.9	10.4	8	5	2.2	2.3	1.9	1.5	1
I.	1.	BY SEX																						
I.	1.	A.	Males		person	5,903	324	279	335	393	563	626	430	357	307	425	636	500	314	124	112	80	73	25
I.	1.	A.	—	of which in	%	49.8	2.7	2.4	2.8	3.3	4.8	5.3	3.6	3	2.6	3.6	5.4	4.2	2.7	1	0.9	0.7	0.6	0.2
I.	1.	B.	Females		person	5,945	297	278	305	405	560	542	401	334	347	511	597	452	284	133	156	141	106	96
I.	1.	B.	—	of which in	%	50.2	2.5	2.3	2.6	3.4	4.7	4.6	3.4	2.8	2.9	4.3	5	3.8	2.4	1.1	1.3	1.2	0.9	0.8

Table 2. Population level in rural areas in 2010 – by age group
SPECIFICATION					Measure unit	POPULATION (by age group in 2010)																		
SPECIFICATION					Measure unit	TOTAL	0–4	5–9	10–14	15–19	20–24	25–29	30–34	35–39	40–44	45–49	50–54	55–59	60–64	65–69	70–74	75–79	80–84	85 +
I.	TOTAL				person	3,621	187	202	198	261	303	326	257	226	229	241	269	217	179	116	148	97	106	59
I.	—	of which in			%	100	5.2	5.6	5.5	7.2	8.4	9	7.1	6.2	6.3	6.7	7.4	6	4.9	3.2	4.1	2.7	2.9	1.6
I.	1.	BY SEX																						
I.	1.	A.	Males		person	1,825	104	113	103	136	159	162	141	113	111	121	157	122	88	50	58	34	38	15
I.	1.	A.	—	of which in	%	50.4	2.9	3.1	2.8	3.8	4.4	4.5	3.9	3.1	3.1	3.3	4.3	3.4	2.4	1.4	1.6	0.9	1	0.4
I.	1.	B.	Females		person	1,796	83	89	95	125	144	164	116	113	118	120	112	95	91	66	90	63	68	44
I.	1.	B.	—	of which in	%	49.6	2.3	2.5	2.6	3.5	4	4.5	3.2	3.1	3.3	3.3	3.1	2.6	2.5	1.8	2.5	1.7	1.9	1.2

Figure 1. Population pyramid of commune in 2010 – by age group and sex
Figure 2. Population pyramid in rural areas in 2010 – by age group and sex

Table 3. Population level of commune in 2010 – by sex
SPECIFICATION						Measure unit	POPULATION (by sex in 2010)		
SPECIFICATION						Measure unit	TOTAL	Males	Females
I.	TOTAL					person	11,848	5,903	5,945
I.	—	of which in				%	100	49.8	50.2
I.	1.	BY AGE GROUP							
I.	1.	A.	At pre-working age			person	2,268	1,155	1,113
I.	1.	A.	—	of which in		%	19.1	9.7	9.4
I.	1.	B.	At working age. grand total			person	8,250	4,334	3,916
I.	1.	B.	—	of which in		%	69.6	36.6	33
I.	1.	B.	a.	at mobile working age		person	4,815	2,459	2,356
I.	1.	B.	a.	—	of which in | %	40.6	20.8	19.8	
I.	1.	B.	b.	at non-mobile working age		person	3,435	1,875	1,560
I.	1.	B.	b.	—	of which in | %	29	15.8	13.2	
I.	1.	C.	At post-working age			person	1,330	414	916
I.	1.	C.	—	of which in		%	11.2	3.5	7.7

Table 4. Population level in rural areas in 2010 – by sex
SPECIFICATION						Measure unit	POPULATION (by sex in 2010)		
SPECIFICATION						Measure unit	TOTAL	Males	Females
I.	TOTAL					person	3,621	1,825	1,796
I.	—	of which in				%	100	50.4	49.6
I.	1.	BY AGE GROUP							
I.	1.	A.	At pre-working age			person	738	396	342
I.	1.	A.	—	of which in		%	20.4	10.9	9.4
I.	1.	B.	At working age. grand total			person	2,266	1,234	1,032
I.	1.	B.	—	of which in		%	62.6	34.1	28.5
I.	1.	B.	a.	at mobile working age		person	1,451	746	705
I.	1.	B.	a.	—	of which in | %	40.1	20.6	19.5	
I.	1.	B.	b.	at non-mobile working age		person	815	488	327
I.	1.	B.	b.	—	of which in | %	22.5	13.5	9	
I.	1.	C.	At post-working age			person	617	195	422
I.	1.	C.	—	of which in		%	17	5.4	11.7

== Villages ==
Apart from the town of Połaniec, Gmina Połaniec contains the villages and settlements of Brzozowa, Kamieniec, Kraśnik, Łęg, Luszyca, Maśnik, Okrągła, Rudniki, Ruszcza, Ruszcza-Kępa, Rybitwy, Tursko Małe, Tursko Małe-Kolonia, Winnica, Wymysłów, Zawada, Zdzieci Nowe, Zdzieci Stare and Zrębin.

== Neighbouring gminas ==
Gmina Połaniec is bordered by the gminas of Borowa, Gawłuszowice, Łubnice, Osiek and Rytwiany.
