= Kraśnik, Świętokrzyskie Voivodeship =

Kraśnik
- Village
- Location within Poland
- Coordinates: 50°25′34″N 21°15′11″E
- Country: Poland
- Voivodeship: Świętokrzyskie
- County: Staszów
- Gmina: Połaniec
- Sołectwo: Kraśnik
- Elevation: 170.4 m (559 ft)

Population (31 December 2009 at Census)
  - Total: ▲61
- Time zone: UTC+1 (CET)
  - Summer (DST): UTC+2 (CEST)
- Postal code: 28–230
- Area code: +48 15
- Car plates: TSZ

Kraśnik [ˈkraɕnik] is a village in the administrative district of Gmina Połaniec, within Staszów County, Świętokrzyskie Voivodeship, in south-central Poland. It lies approximately 3 km (2 mi) south-west of Połaniec, 17 km (11 mi) south of Staszów, and 69 km (43 mi) south-east of the regional capital Kielce.
