= Mohyliv-Podilskyi =

City in Vinnytsia Oblast, Ukraine

Mohyliv-Podilskyi Могилів-Подільський
- City
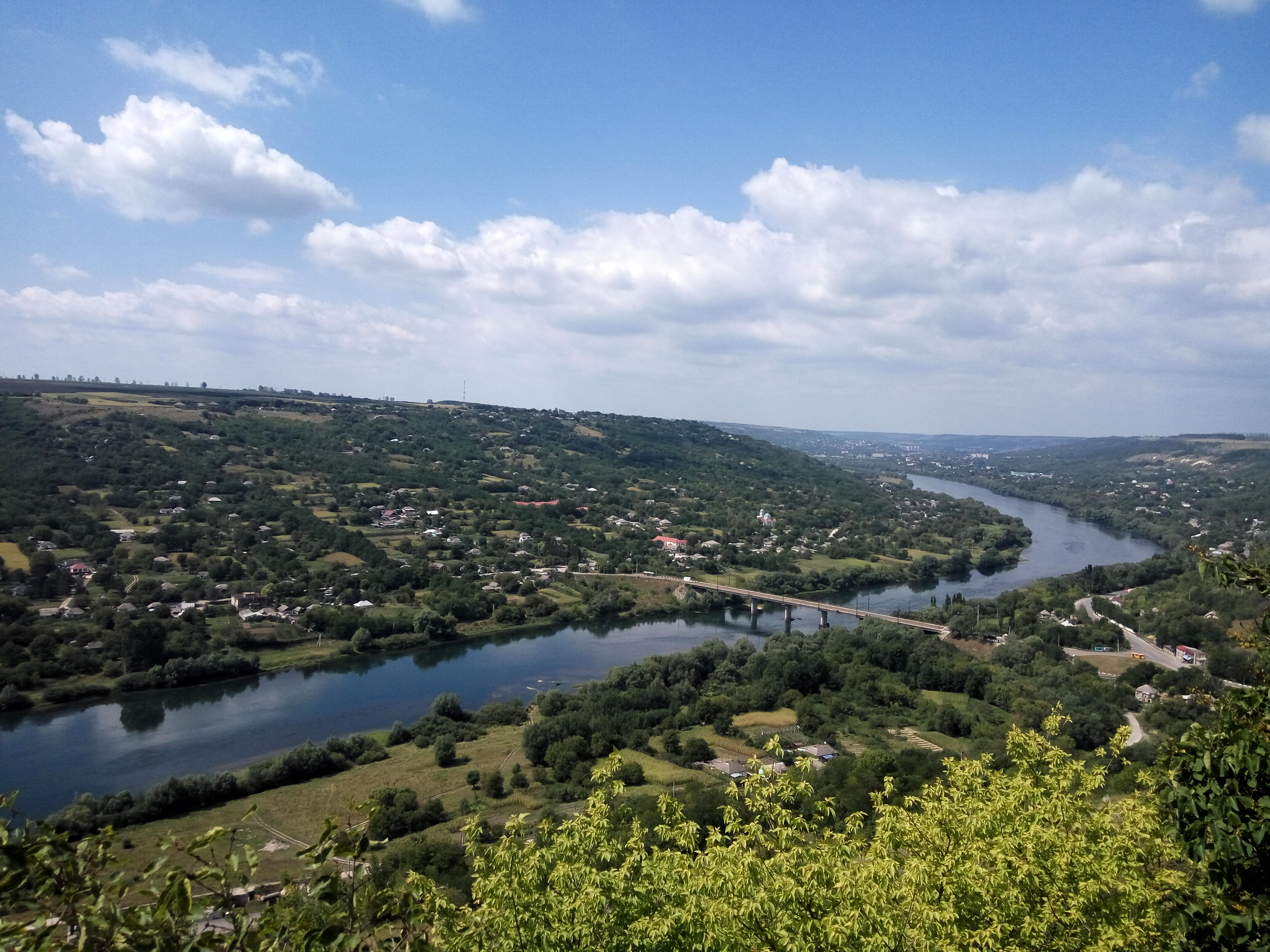
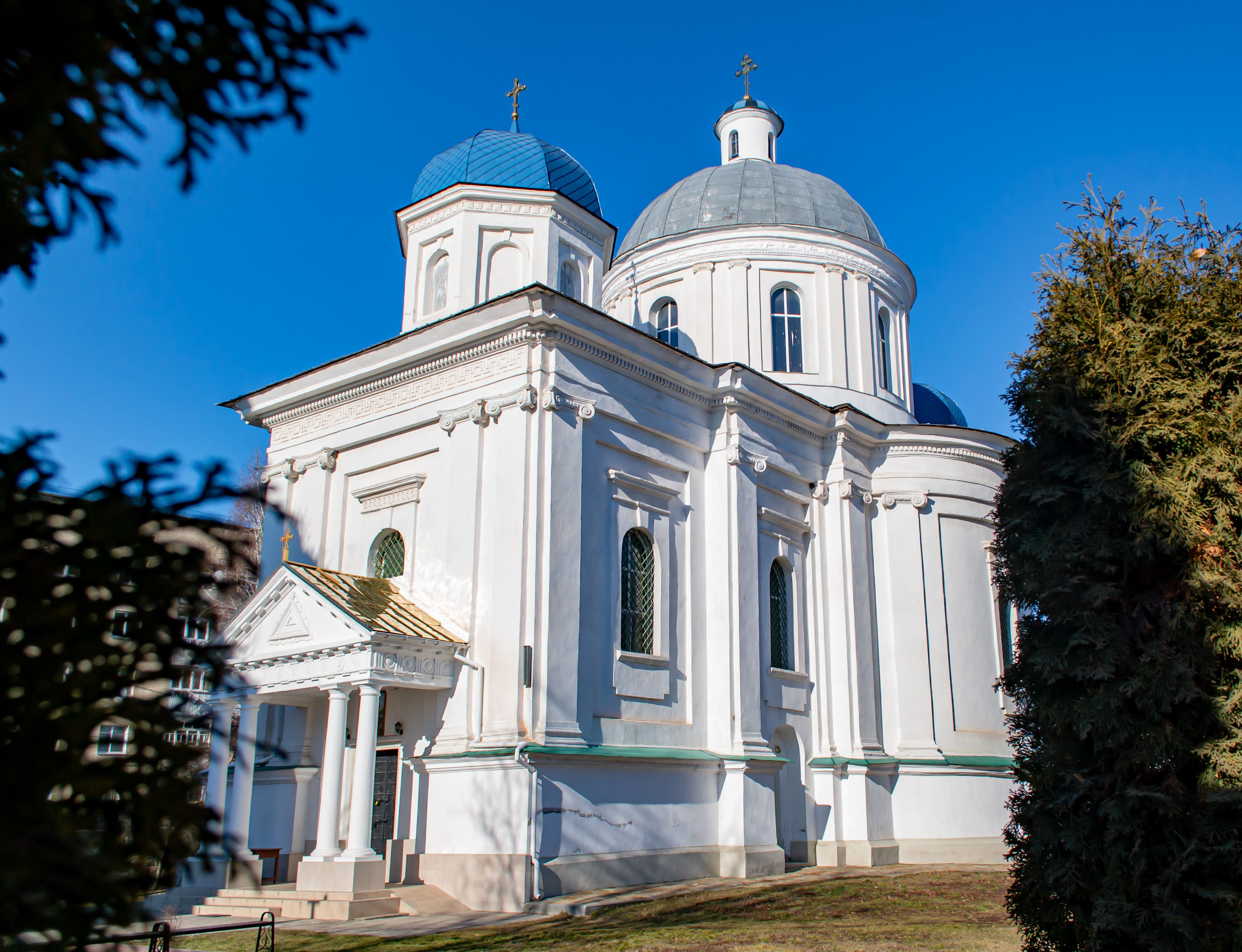
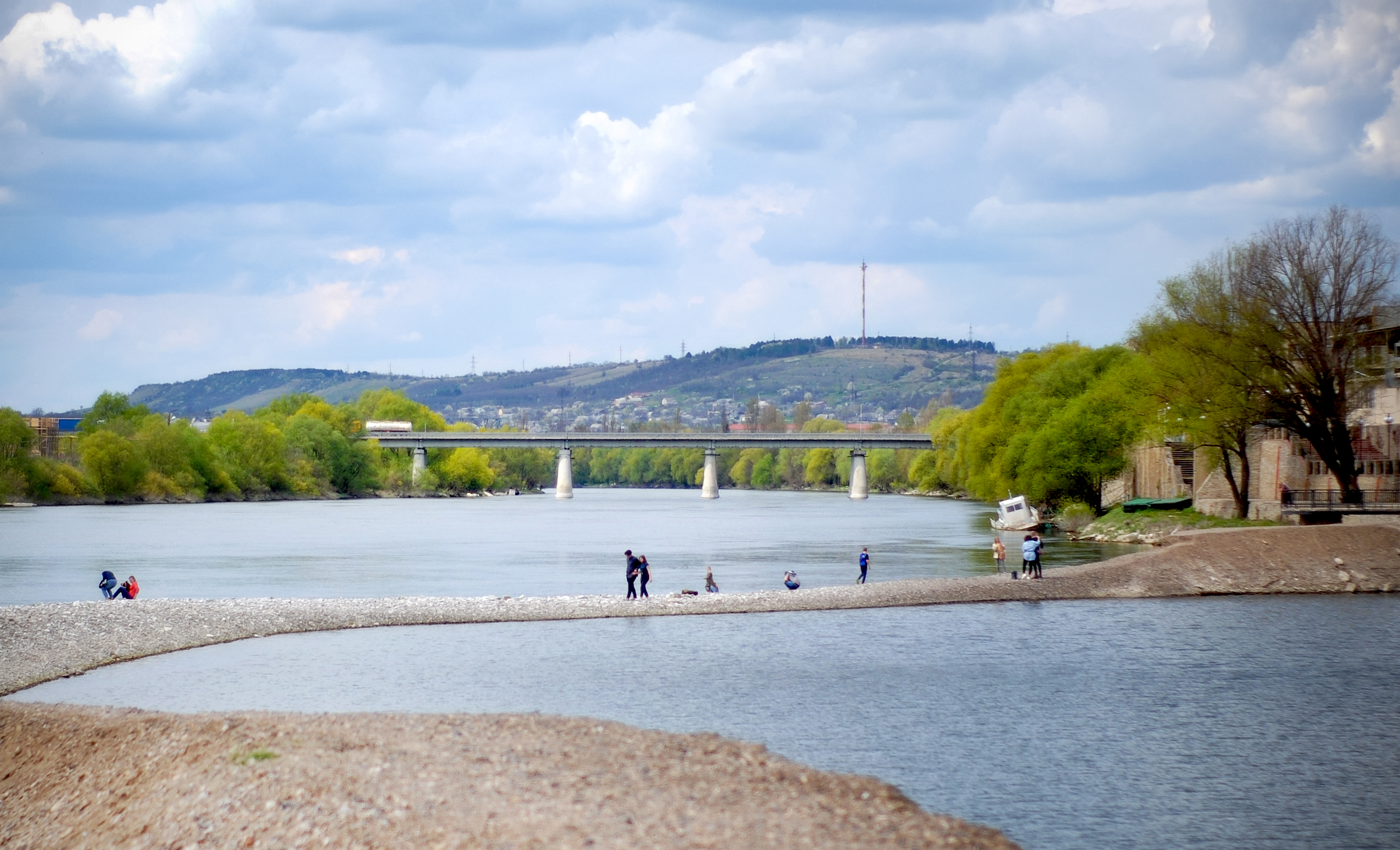
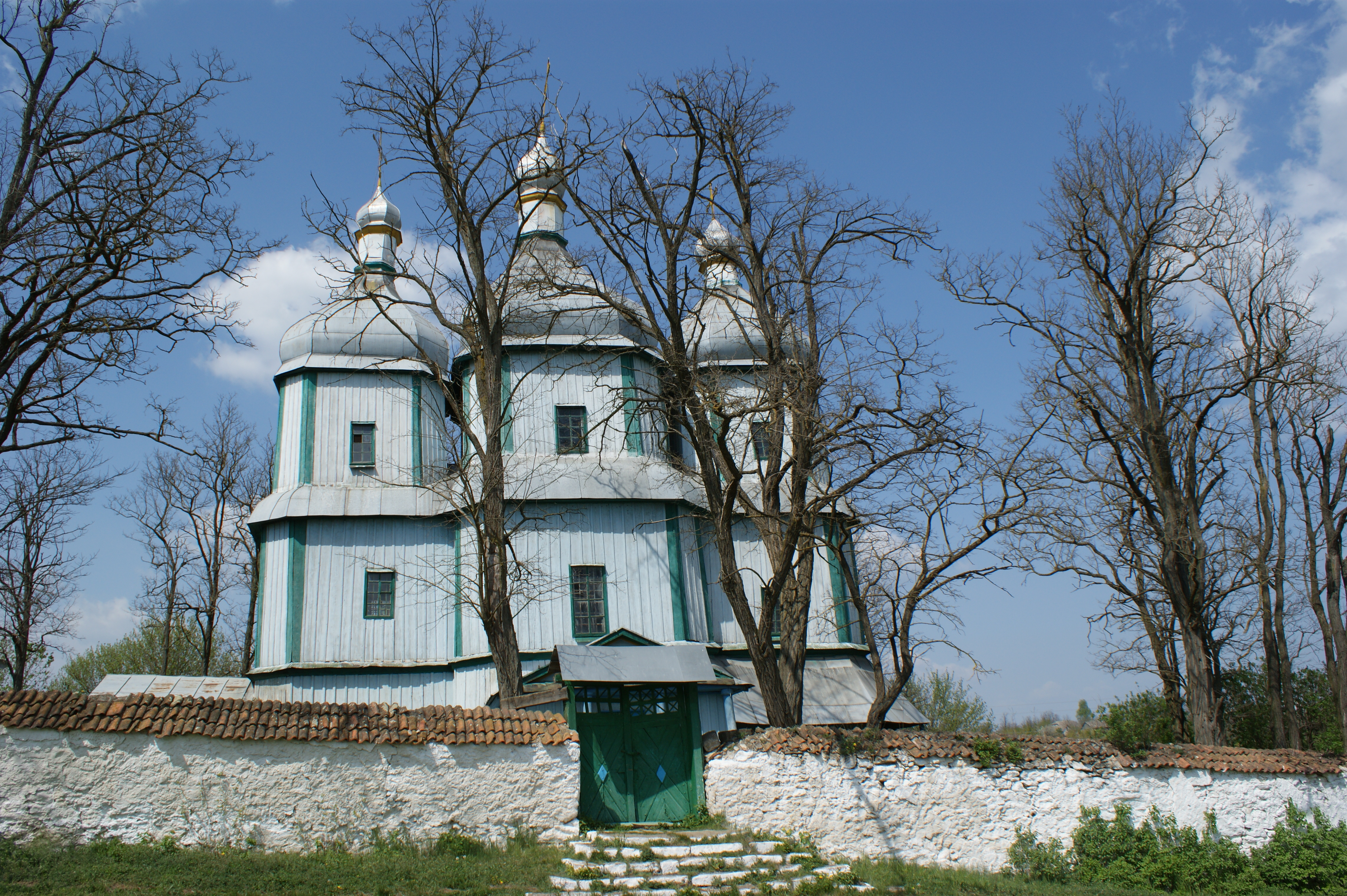
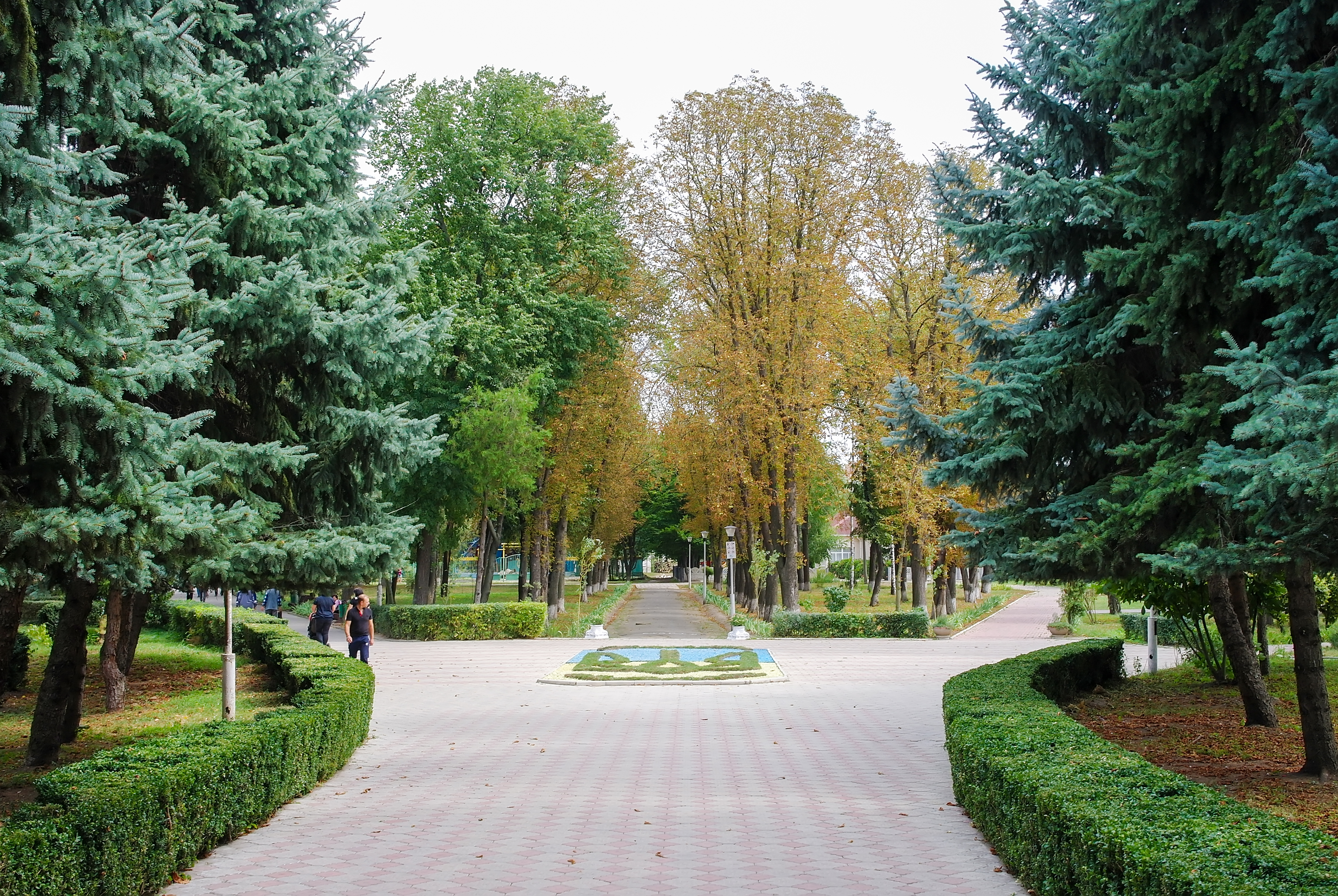
- Top to bottom, left to right: Dniester River and border with Moldova; Saint George's Church; Friendship Bridge to Otaci; Dormition Church; Central Park of Culture and Recreation

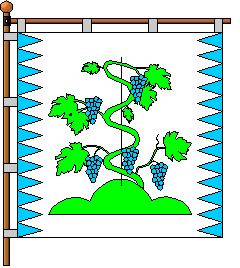
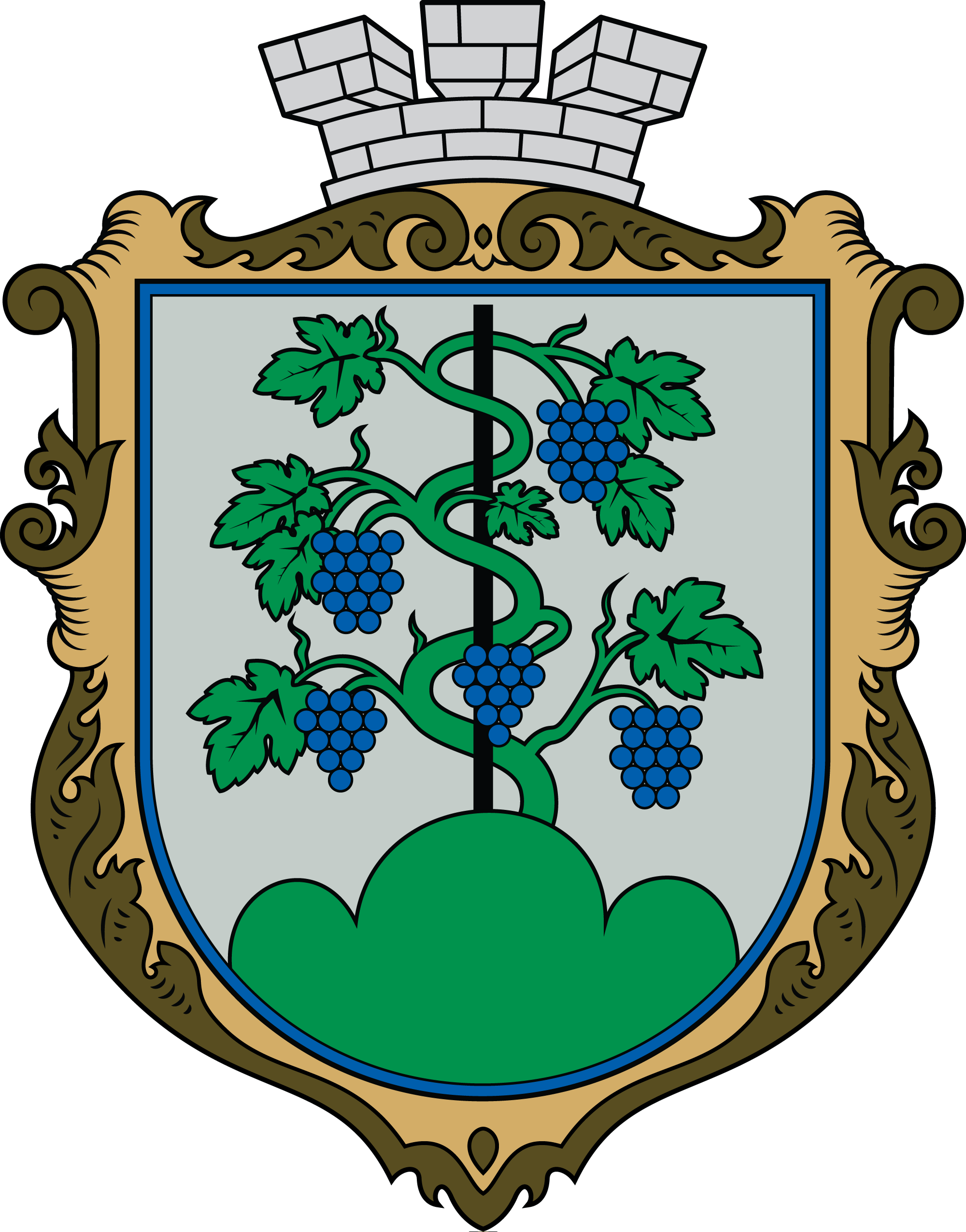
- Flag Coat of arms
- Interactive map of Mohyliv-Podilskyi
- Location within Vinnytsia Oblast Location within Ukraine
- Coordinates: 48°27′00″N 27°47′00″E
- Country: Ukraine
- Oblast: Vinnytsia Oblast
- Raion: Mohyliv-Podilskyi Raion
- Hromada: Mohyliv-Podilskyi urban hromada
- Founded: 1595
- Magdeburg rights: 1743
- City status: 1796

Government
  - Mayor: Petro Brovko

Area
  - Total: 21.63 km^{2} (8.35 sq mi)
- Elevation: 79 m (259 ft)

Population (2022)
  - Total: 29,925
  - Density: 1,383/km^{2} (3,583/sq mi)
- Time zone: UTC+2 (EET)
  - Summer (DST): UTC+3 (EEST)
- Postal code: 24000-24004
- Area code: +380-4337
- Website: mpmr.gov.ua

Mohyliv-Podilskyi (Ukrainian: Могилів-Подільський, IPA: [moɦɪˈl⁽ʲ⁾iu̯ poˈd⁽ʲ⁾ilʲsʲkɪi̯]) is a city in Vinnytsia Oblast, Ukraine. It serves as the administrative center of Mohyliv-Podilskyi Raion within the oblast. It is located in the historic region of Podolia, on the border with Bessarabia, Moldova, along the left bank of the Dniester River. On the opposite side of the river lies the Moldovan town of Otaci, and the two municipalities are connected to each other by a bridge. Population: 29,925 (2022 estimate).

== Name ==
In addition to the Ukrainian Могилів-Подільський (Mohyliv-Podilskyi), in other languages the name of the city is Polish: Mohylów Podolski, Romanian: Moghilău/Movilău and Yiddish: מאָהילעװ, romanized: Mohilev.

== History ==
Historical affiliations

Polish–Lithuanian Commonwealth 1595–1672
Ottoman Empire 1672–1699
Polish–Lithuanian Commonwealth 1699–1793
Russian Empire 1793–1917
Ukraine Ukrainian People's Republic and Ukrainian State 1917-1920
Soviet Ukraine 1920–1922
Soviet Union 1922–1941
Kingdom of Romania 1941–1944
Soviet Union 1944–1991
Ukraine 1991–present

=== Polish period ===
The first mention of the town dates from 1595. The owner of the town, Moldavian hospodar Ieremia Movilă (from which the name Mohyliv, Moghilău/Movilău in Romanian) bestowed it as a dowry gift to his daughter, who married into the Potocki family of Polish nobility. At that time, the groom named the town Movilău in honor of his father-in-law. In the first quarter of the 17th century, Mohyliv became one of the largest towns in Podolia. It was part of the Podolian Voivodeship of the Lesser Poland Province of the Polish Crown. It was a multi-ethnic border town whose population included Poles, Greeks, Armenians, Serbs, Vlachs and Bosniaks. In the 18th century the main churches of the town were built: the Polish-Armenian Church of the Visitation of the Blessed Virgin Mary and the Greek St. Nicholas Church. Polish rule was interrupted by Ottoman rule as part of Podolia Eyalet. During Ottoman rule, it was nahiya centre of Kamaniçe sanjak as Mıhaylov.

=== Russian period ===
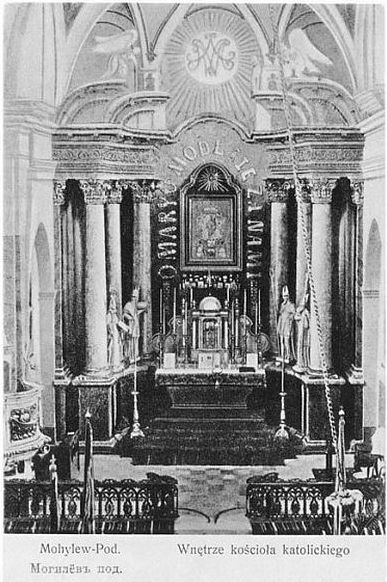
Interior of the Polish Church of the Visitation of the Blessed Virgin Mary prior to 1937 demolition

The town was annexed by Russia after the 1793 Second Partition of Poland. After the restoration of Polish independence, Mohyliv was briefly captured by the Poles under the command of General Franciszek Krajowski in 1919, but it ultimately fell to the Soviet Union. In 1937, during the Polish Operation of the NKVD, the Soviets destroyed the Polish Church of the Visitation of the Blessed Virgin Mary.

=== Romanian occupation and the Holocaust ===
Mohyliv-Podilskyi was occupied by German and Romanian forces on 19 July 1941 during the Axis invasion of the Soviet Union. Jews were subjected to robbery, abuse, expulsions and killings immediately after the occupation. Later in 1941, the city was incorporated into the Romanian-administered Transnistria Governorate.

Because of its location near the Dniester and the Romanian frontier, Mohyliv-Podilskyi became one of the principal transit points for Jews deported by the Romanian authorities from Bessarabia and Bukovina into Transnistria. Between 15 September 1941 and 15 February 1942, 55,913 Jewish deportees passed through the city. Deportees were crowded into a transit camp under severe conditions before many were forced onward on foot to towns, villages and camps in the interior of Transnistria. More than 15,000 deportees eventually managed to remain in Mohyliv-Podilskyi, although only about 9,000 initially had official permission to do so.

A Jewish committee was established in November 1941 under the leadership of engineer Siegfried Jagendorf. The committee organized food distribution, health and burial services and attempted to protect Jews from deportation by demonstrating their usefulness as skilled workers. Jagendorf obtained permission to reopen the city's damaged foundry and other industrial facilities. Jews employed in these enterprises, together with their families, enjoyed some protection from deportation and forced-labour roundups.

Conditions nevertheless remained extremely harsh. An epidemic of typhus that began in late 1941 killed thousands of Jews during the winter of 1941–1942. Jagendorf reported 3,410 deaths from typhus among an officially registered Jewish population of 12,276. Forced labour, overcrowding, hunger and inadequate shelter also contributed to the high mortality rate.

In June 1942, the Romanian authorities ordered the establishment of ghettos in Moghilău County, and on 1 July the Jewish population of Mohyliv-Podilskyi was confined to several streets that were designated as a ghetto. Residents were required to wear a yellow Star of David, and the ghetto was enclosed with rubble walls and barbed wire. Hundreds of families were left without adequate accommodation.

The Romanian authorities repeatedly deported Jews from Mohyliv-Podilskyi to other camps and ghettos. In May and June 1942 approximately 4,000 were ordered deported to the camp at Skazynets. About half died there from the severe conditions, while others were transferred elsewhere or eventually returned to Mohyliv-Podilskyi. Other Jews were deported to the Pechora concentration camp, where starvation, disease and exposure caused extremely high mortality. A further deportation began on 12 October 1942; by 8 November about 1,500 Jews had been sent from Mohyliv-Podilskyi to Pechora.

Despite the deportations and deaths, Mohyliv-Podilskyi remained one of the largest concentrations of Jews in Transnistria. On 31 January 1943, approximately 15,000 Jews were living there, including about 12,000 deportees and 3,000 local Jews. The Jewish committee operated soup kitchens, medical services and orphanages and received assistance from Jewish relief organizations in Romania. By early 1943, more than 1,100 children were housed in the city's Jewish orphanages.

Conditions improved somewhat during 1943 as aid from Romania increased and the threat of further deportations diminished. In December 1943, Romanian authorities permitted 3,198 Jews originally deported from Dorohoi County to return to Romania. At that time, 12,836 deportees from Bukovina, 348 from Bessarabia and approximately 3,000 local Jews remained in Mohyliv-Podilskyi. In March 1944, shortly before the Soviet advance reached the city, Jewish relief organizations obtained permission to repatriate more than 1,000 Jewish orphans to Romania.

The Red Army recaptured Mohyliv-Podilskyi on 19 March 1944. Some Jewish men were subsequently conscripted into the Soviet military or mobilized for labour in the Soviet interior. Most surviving Romanian Jewish deportees were permitted to return to Romania in the spring of 1945.

=== Ukrainian period ===
Mohyliv-Podilskyi has been part of Ukraine since August 24, 1991.

On November 10, 2016, in Mohyliv-Podilskyi, a memorial to the heroes of border guards who died in 1941 was opened.

== Population ==
=== Language ===
Distribution of the population by native language according to the 2001 census:

Language	Percentage
Ukrainian	92.25%
Russian	7.06%
other/undecided	0.69%

== Geography ==
The city is located in the southwest of the Vinnytsia region in the ravine formed by the Dniester River and other ravines (Karpivskyi yar), which are formed by the rivers that enter the Dniester basin (Derlo, Nemia, etc.). During the period of snow melting and after rains, temporary drains flow along the bottoms of the beams and the slopes of the ravines.

The average height above sea level is 80 m.

=== Climate ===
Climate data for Mohyliv-Podilskyi (1981–2010)
Month	Jan	Feb	Mar	Apr	May	Jun	Jul	Aug	Sep	Oct	Nov	Dec	Year
Mean daily maximum °C (°F)	1.1 (34.0)	2.9 (37.2)	8.7 (47.7)	16.4 (61.5)	23.0 (73.4)	25.8 (78.4)	27.8 (82.0)	27.4 (81.3)	21.8 (71.2)	15.5 (59.9)	7.4 (45.3)	2.1 (35.8)	15.0 (59.0)
Daily mean °C (°F)	−2.3 (27.9)	−1.2 (29.8)	3.4 (38.1)	10.0 (50.0)	16.0 (60.8)	19.0 (66.2)	20.9 (69.6)	20.0 (68.0)	14.9 (58.8)	9.3 (48.7)	3.6 (38.5)	−1.0 (30.2)	9.4 (48.9)
Mean daily minimum °C (°F)	−5.6 (21.9)	−4.8 (23.4)	−1.0 (30.2)	4.4 (39.9)	9.2 (48.6)	12.7 (54.9)	14.6 (58.3)	13.6 (56.5)	9.3 (48.7)	4.6 (40.3)	0.4 (32.7)	−3.9 (25.0)	4.5 (40.1)
Average precipitation mm (inches)	29.0 (1.14)	28.1 (1.11)	27.7 (1.09)	45.3 (1.78)	64.2 (2.53)	86.7 (3.41)	97.1 (3.82)	57.4 (2.26)	55.4 (2.18)	33.5 (1.32)	39.3 (1.55)	32.7 (1.29)	596.4 (23.48)
Average precipitation days (≥ 1.0 mm)	6.1	6.6	6.0	7.7	8.6	9.0	9.3	7.0	6.4	5.7	6.4	7.1	85.9
Average relative humidity (%)	80.4	77.8	71.6	66.4	66.8	71.3	72.2	72.3	75.4	78.1	81.4	82.2	74.7
Source: NOAA

== Economy ==
Now working in the city:

- Mohyliv-Podilsky Machine-Building Plant;
- metalworking plants;
- light and food industry enterprises, etc.

== Notable people ==
- Boris Bazhanov (1900–1982), Stalin's personal secretary who later defected
- Witold Maliszewski (1873–1939), a Polish composer, professor of the Warsaw Conservatory, was born in Mohyliv-Podilskyi.
- Chaim Towber (1901–1972), American actor, best known as the author of the song I Love You Much Too Much
- Samuel Yellin (1884–1940), American master blacksmith and metal designer, born in Mohyliv-Podilskyi
- Adella Kean Zametkin (1863–1931), American socialist and writer, was born in Mohyliv-Podilskyi
- Leonid Mosendz - Ukrainian poet
- Ivan Hlyinskyi - Ukrainian poet
- Serhii Naiev - Ukrainian lieutenant general who served as Commander of the Joint Forces of the Armed Forces of Ukraine from 2020 until 2024.
- Hennadii Vatsak (born 1972), Ukrainian businessman and politician
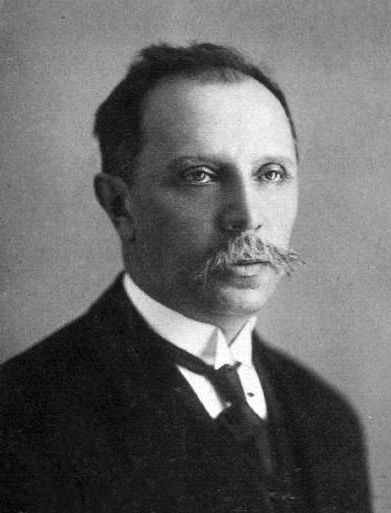
Witold Maliszewski

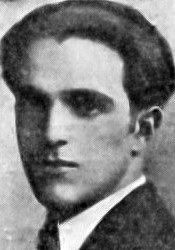
Chaim Towber

== Gallery ==
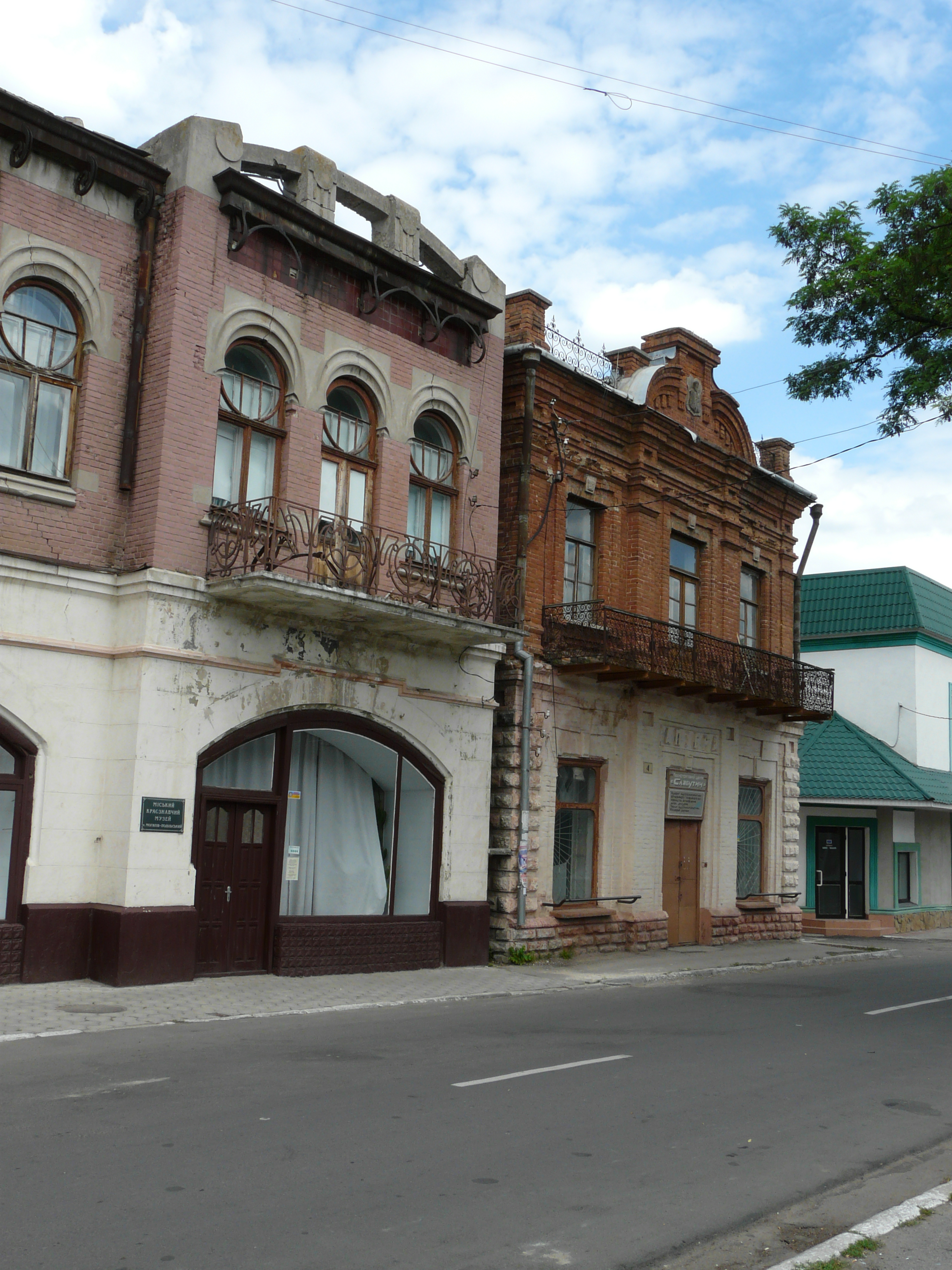
19th century architecture in Mohyliv-Podilskyj

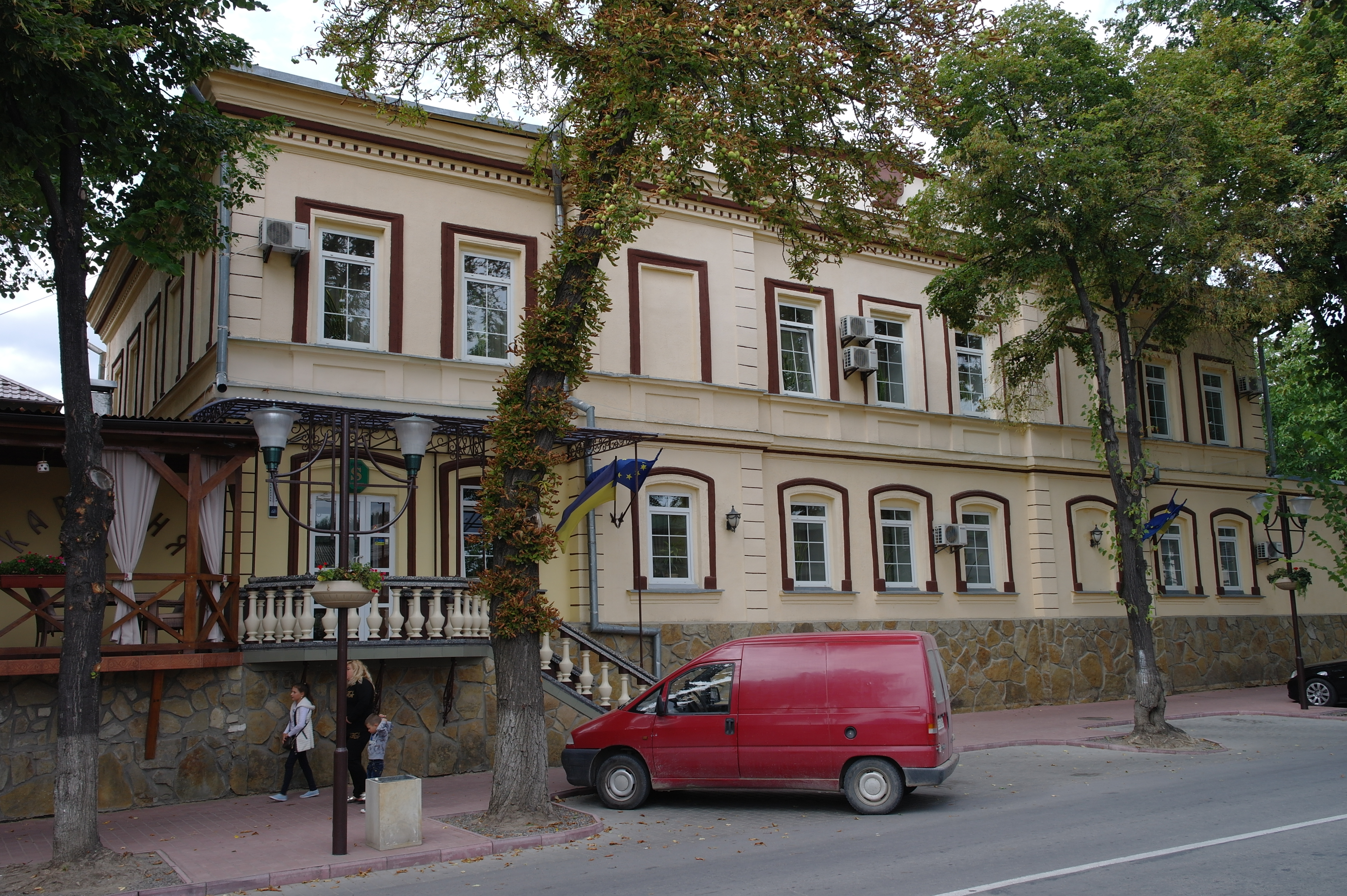
City centre

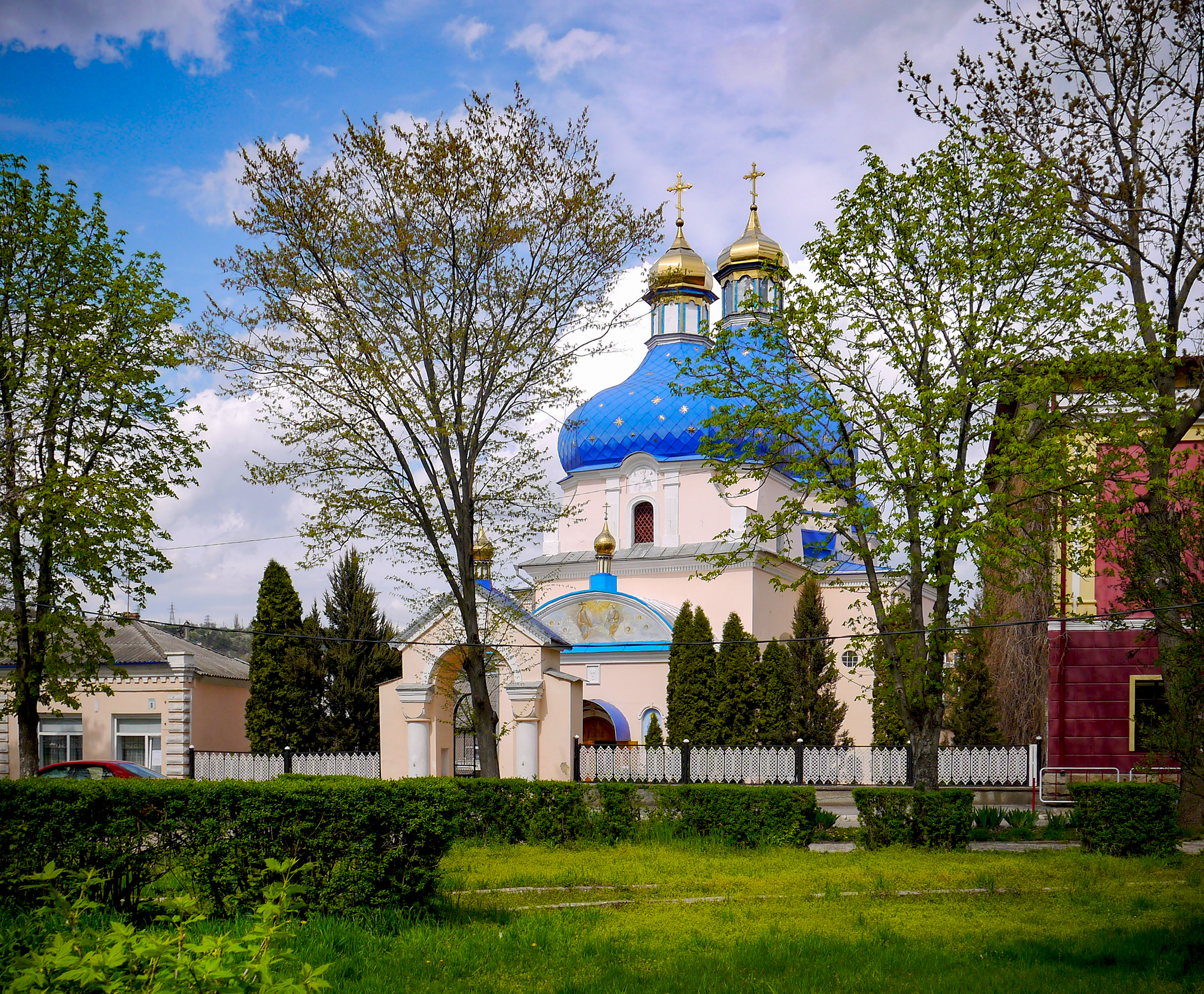
St. Nicholas Church

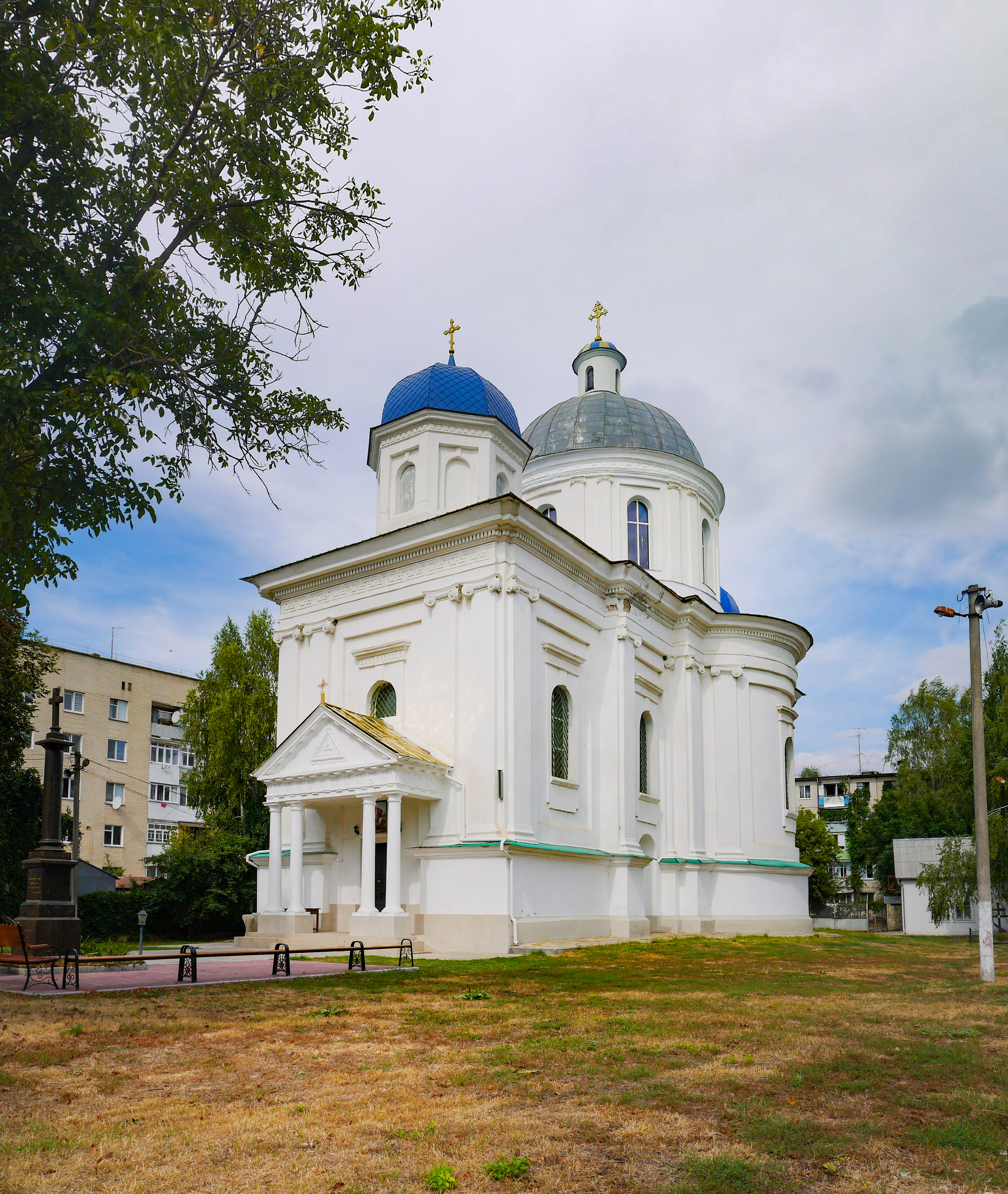
St. George Church

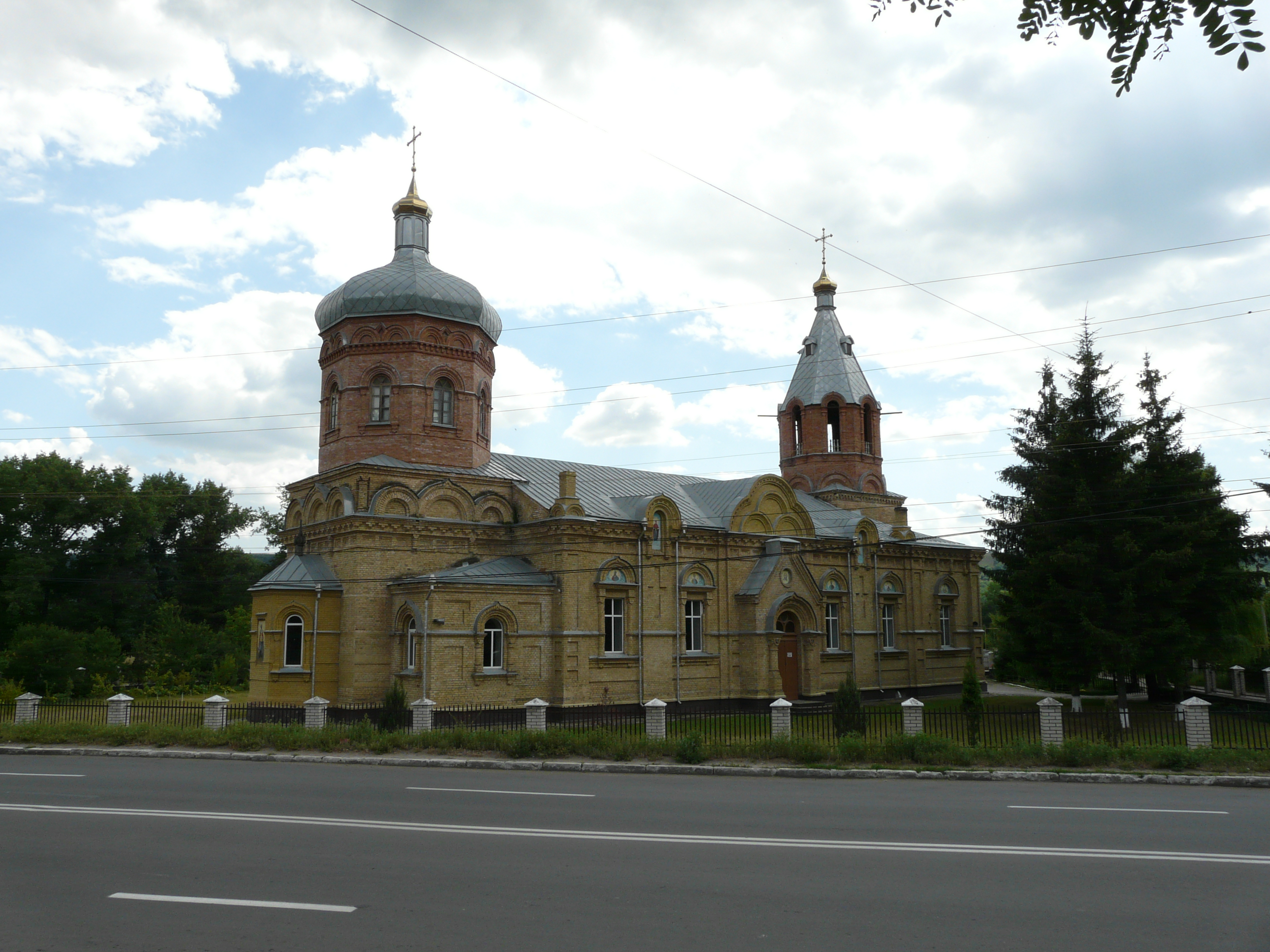
Saint Alexander Nevsky Church

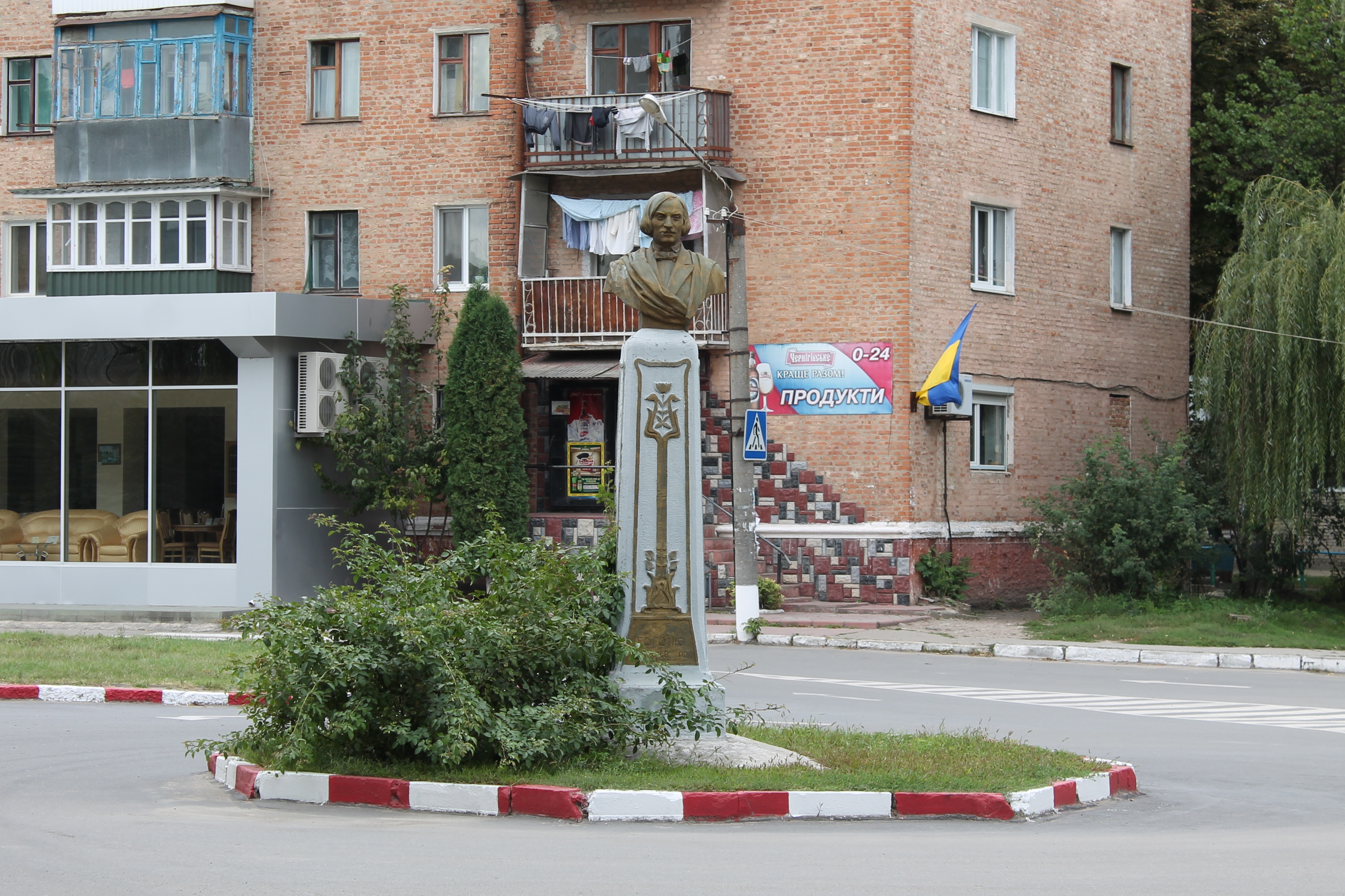
Nikolai Gogol monument

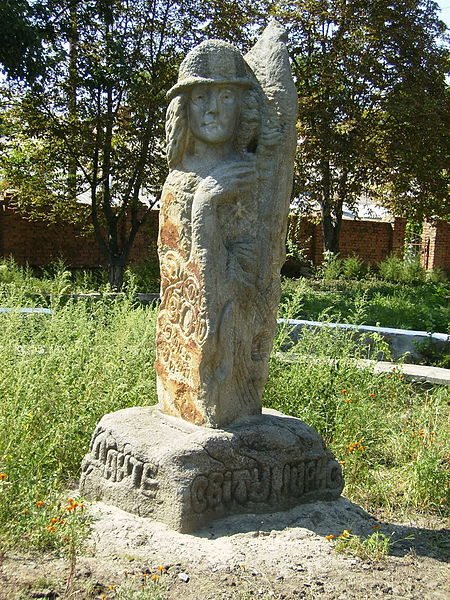
John Lennon monument

== International relations ==
=== Twin towns — sister cities ===
Mohyliv-Podilskyi is twinned with:

- Bakhmut, Ukraine
- Koziatyn, Ukraine
- Końskie, Poland
- Połaniec, Poland
- Środa Wielkopolska, Poland
- Bălți, Moldova
- Pitești, Romania
- Šaľa, Slovakia
- Cavriglia, Italy

== See also ==
- History of the Jews in Bessarabia
- History of the Jews in Transnistria
- History of the Jews in Bukovina
- Shargorod
- Tulchyn
- Pechora concentration camp
- Dorohoi
- Dorohoi County
