= Ruszcza-Kępa =

- Village
- Location within Poland
- Coordinates: 50°23′50″N 21°15′43″E
- Country: Poland
- Voivodeship: Świętokrzyskie
- County: Staszów
- Gmina: Połaniec
- Sołectwo: Ruszcza-Kępa
- Elevation: 159.6 m (524 ft)
- Time zone: UTC+1 (CET)
  - Summer (DST): UTC+2 (CEST)
- Postal code: 28-230
- Area code: +48 15
- Car plates: TSZ

Ruszcza-Kępa [ˈruʂt͡ʂa ˈkɛmpa] is a village in the administrative district of Gmina Połaniec, within Staszów County, Świętokrzyskie Voivodeship, in south-central Poland.
