= Zawada, Staszów County =

Zawada
- Village
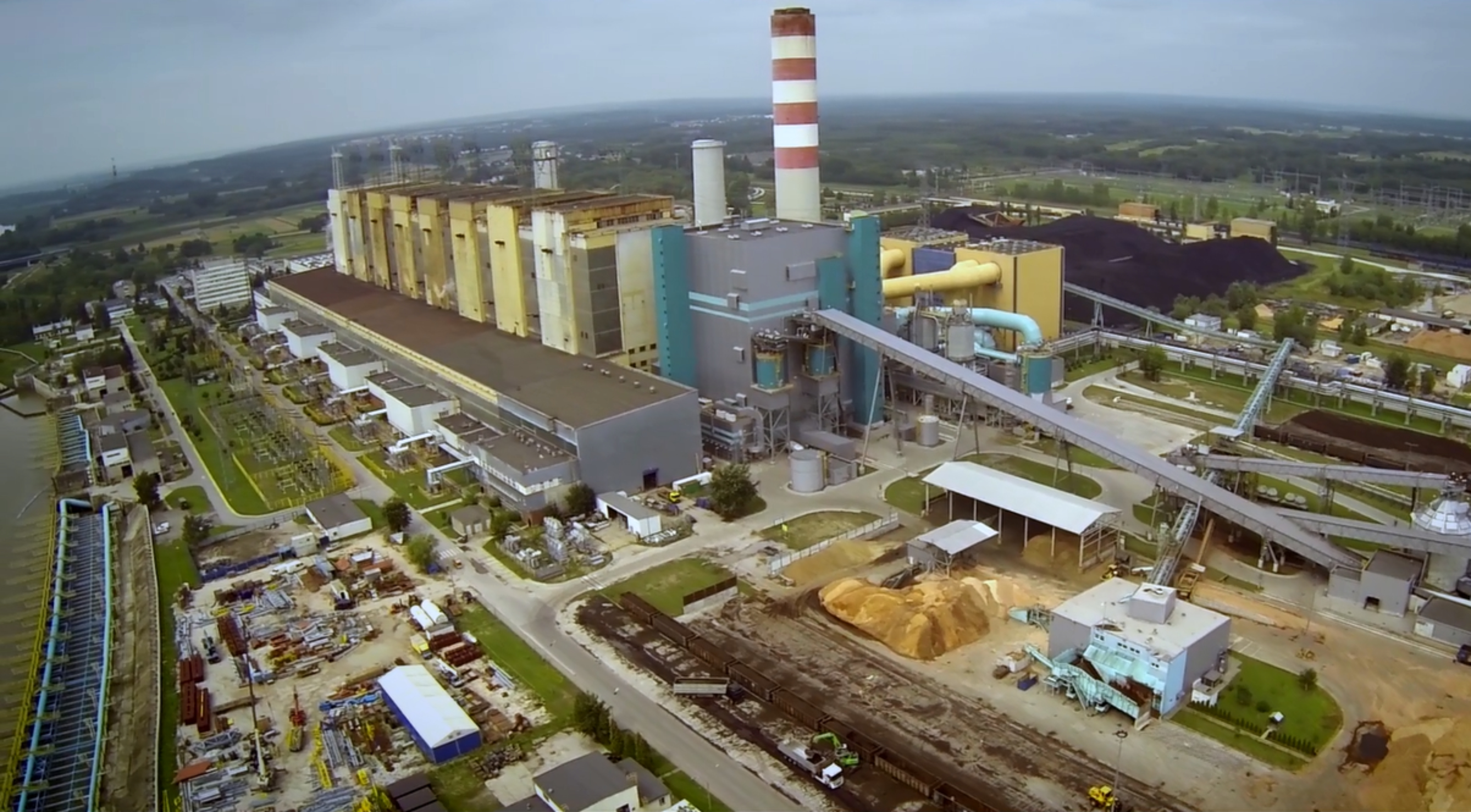

- Location within Poland
- Coordinates: 50°25′54″N 21°19′51″E
- Country: Poland
- Voivodeship: Świętokrzyskie
- County: Staszów
- Gmina: Połaniec
- Sołectwo: Łęg-Zawada
- Elevation: 154.3 m (506 ft)
- Time zone: UTC+1 (CET)
  - Summer (DST): UTC+2 (CEST)
- Postal code: 28-230
- Area code: +48 15
- Car plates: TSZ

Zawada [zaˈvada] is a village in the administrative district of Gmina Połaniec, within Staszów County, Świętokrzyskie Voivodeship, in south-central Poland. It lies approximately 4 km (2 mi) east of Połaniec, 19 km (12 mi) south-east of Staszów, and 72 km (45 mi) south-east of the regional capital Kielce.
