= Hennadii Vatsak =

Ukrainian businessman and politician

- Геннадій Вацак
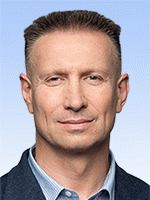
- Official portrait, 2019

People's Deputy of Ukraine
- Incumbent
- Assumed office 29 August 2019
- Preceded by: Yuriy Makedon
- Constituency: Vinnytsia Oblast, No. 16

Personal details
- Born: 9 February 1972 (age 54) Mohyliv-Podilskyi, Ukrainian SSR, Soviet Union (now Ukraine)
- Party: For the Future
- Other political affiliations: Independent; Petro Poroshenko Bloc

Hennadii Anatoliyovych Vatsak (Ukrainian: Геннадій Анатолійович Вацак; born 9 February 1972) is a Ukrainian businessman and politician currently serving as a People's Deputy of Ukraine representing Ukraine's 16th electoral district as a member of For the Future. Secretary of the Verkhovna Rada Committee on Transport and Infrastructure.

== Biography ==
Hennadii Anatoliyovych Vatsak was born on 9 February 1972 in the city of Mohyliv-Podilskyi in Ukraine's Vinnytsia Oblast. He has a vocational education. After school he entered the Mohyliv-Podilsky Medical College, graduating in 1991. Until 1994 he worked as a paramedic at a children's hospital. From 1995 to 1999 he worked as a waiter in a restaurant.

He owns the Vatsak Confectionery House, which produces confectionery. He also announced in 2018 that he plans to start a construction business by building 4 plants in Mogilev-Podolsky.

=== Political activity ===
In 2015 he was elected a deputy of the Vinnytsia Regional Council from the Petro Poroshenko Bloc. Secretary of the Standing Committee of the Regional Council on Legality, Anti-Corruption, Lustration, Rules of Procedure and Deputies' Activities. His assistant is Tetiana Anatoliyivna Fomenko. Vatsak is considered one of the richest deputies in Vinnytsia.

In 2019, he ran for the Verkhovna Rada of Ukraine in Ukraine's 16th electoral district (Mohyliv-Podilskyi, Kryzhopilskyi, Mohyliv-Podilskyi, Pishchanskyi, Chechelnytskyi, Yampilskyi districts) as an independent self-nominated candidate. At the time of the election, Vatsak was director of the Marketing Department of Vatsak Confectionery House LLC, an independent, and living in Mohyliv-Podilskyi.

On 11–13 June 2019, self-nominated Vatsak opened three photo zones "I love my city / village" in Gorodkivka, Pishchanka and Kryzhopil. The discoveries were accompanied by entertainment, competitions and treats with sweets Vatsak also financed the organization of a mixed martial arts tournament (MMA) in Yampil, and distributed cash prizes to soldiers and residents of the city. In June 2019, self-nominated Vatsak launched a social initiative called "See Better", a program wherein ophthalmologists would make field visits for residents of the 16th electoral district.

On 17 December 2020, he voted "FOR" the appointment of the plagiarist SM Scarlett as Minister of Education and Science, who was even opposed by the relevant committee.

=== Automobiles ===
In 2008 he owned a Hummer car, which he sold in 2013. Then he started driving a BMW X6 in 2009. Then he changed his car from a BMW X6 to a Maserati Quattroporte Q4 and a Jaguar F-Type.

=== Charity ===
In 2016, he opened a children's chess school "Vatsak" in Mohyliv-Podilskyi. Supported by the sports club "Spartak-Vatsak", the club won the Vinnytsia Kickboxing Cup in 2016. He built a 40-meter fountain on Shana Square in Mogilev-Podolsky.

In 2013 he won the nomination "Philanthropist: small business (including individuals - entrepreneurs)" of the National Competition "Charitable Ukraine - 2013".
