= Połaniec =

- Town
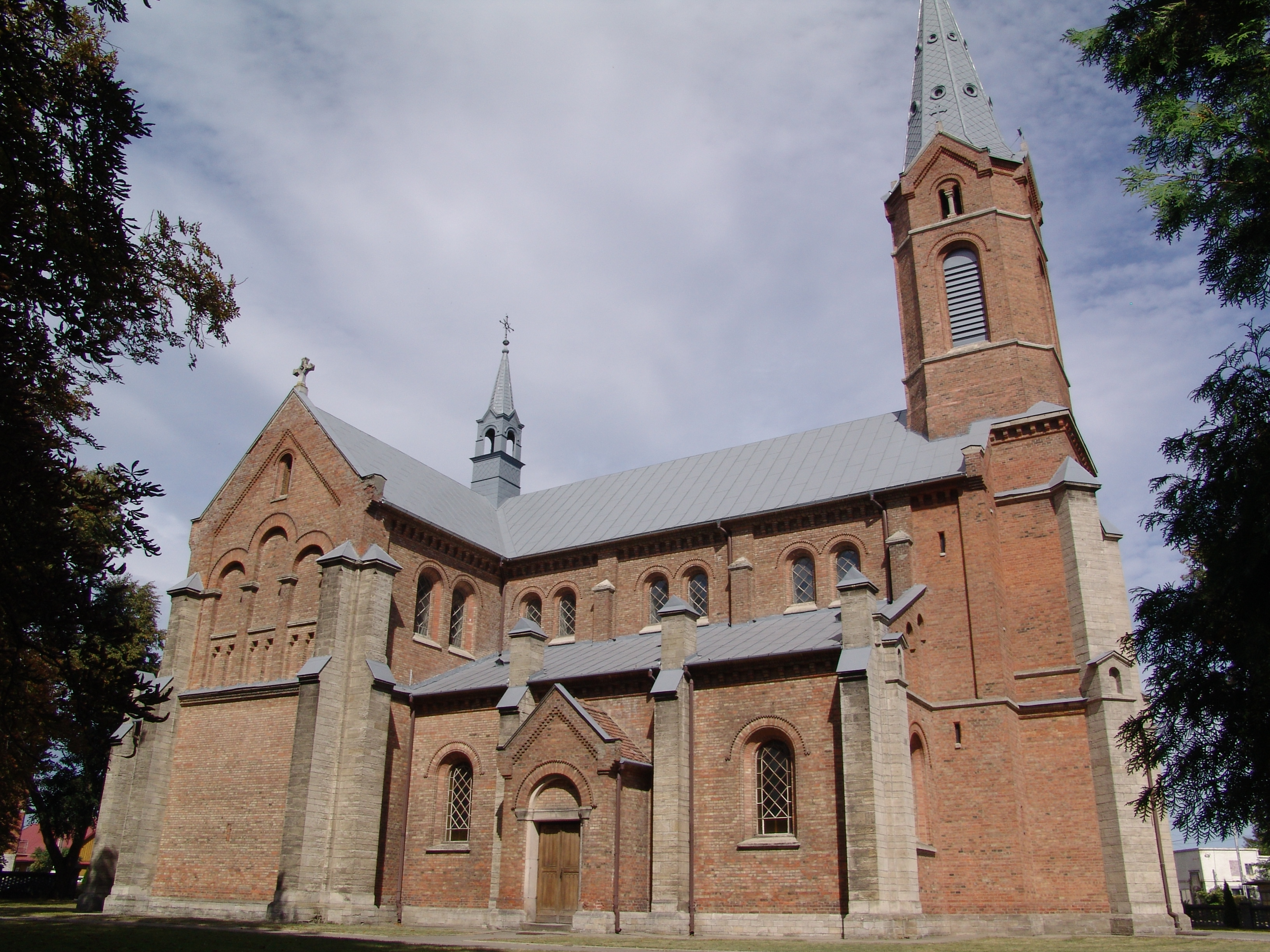
- Saint Martin's Church

- Flag Coat of arms

- Location within Poland
- Coordinates: 50°25′59″N 21°16′49″E
- Country: Poland
- Voivodeship: Świętokrzyskie
- County: Staszów
- Gmina: Połaniec
- Town rights: 1264
- Parts of town: Townships' List: Barszczówka; Daszyn; Kolonia Połaniec; Podskale; Rychterówka; Żapniów

Area (through the years 2008-2010)
  - Total: 17.41 km^{2} (6.72 sq mi)
- Elevation: 166.3 m (546 ft)

Population (31 December 2012 at Census)
  - Total: 8,406
  - Density: 482.8/km^{2} (1,251/sq mi)
- Time zone: UTC+1 (CET)
  - Summer (DST): UTC+2 (CEST)
- Postal code: 28-230
- Area code: +48 15
- Vehicle registration: TSZ
- Website: http://www.polaniec.pl

Połaniec [pɔˈwaɲɛt͡s] is a town in Staszów County, Świętokrzyskie Voivodeship, Poland, with 8,406 inhabitants (2012). The town is in Lesser Poland, and its history dates back to the early days of Polish statehood. It lies in the western part of the Sandomierz Basin, a few kilometres north of the Vistula, along the National Road Nr. 79, from Bytom to Warsaw. The town has a railway station serving a secondary line, nr. 75 from Rytwiany to Połaniec.

The Połaniec Power Station is one of the largest (1800 MW) coal-fired power plants in Poland and, since 2012, one of the largest biomass plants in the world. It is located outside the town, in the nearby village of Zawada.

== History ==
The history of Połaniec dates back to the 11th century, when a gord was built near the spot where the Czarna flows into the Vistula. A settlement emerged in the 11th–12th centuries, with St. Catherine church in the vicinity of the gord. In 1241 Połaniec was completely destroyed in the Mongol invasion of Poland, and near the local village of Tursko a battle took place with the invaders. Połaniec recovered, gaining town rights before 1264, and by 1340, it had some 400 residents. Ten years later, in 1350, King Casimir III the Great ordered the town to move from its location on the Winna Góra hill to its present location. In the late Middle Ages, Połaniec was an important trade centre, located along the merchant route from Kraków to Sandomierz, and near the very important waterway, the Vistula. It was a royal town of the Kingdom of Poland, administratively located in the Sandomierz County in the Sandomierz Voivodeship in the Lesser Poland Province.

At the beginning of the 16th century, Połaniec was burned to the ground by the Crimean Tatars, so that King Zygmunt Stary lowered the residents' taxes. In 1526 the town was once again in a conflagration. In the mid-16th century, a town hall, funded by hetman Jan Tarnowski was erected in Połaniec. At the beginning of the 17th century, a hospital was built. Following the First Partition of Poland in 1772, Połaniec suddenly became a border town of Poland, when the Austrian province of Galicia was created. Establishing a border along the Vistula slowed economic development in Połaniec. In 1794 the town was one of centres of the Kościuszko Uprising: it was the scene of the Proclamation of Połaniec on 7 May 1794. During the Third Partition of Poland in 1795 the town was annexed by Austria. After the Polish victory in the Austro-Polish War of 1809, it was part of the Polish Duchy of Warsaw. After the duchy's dissolution in 1815, it became part of Russian-controlled Congress Poland. On 1 June 1869, as a punishment for the January Uprising, it lost its town privileges. At that time, its population was around 2,000. While in the Kielce Voivodeship during the Second Polish Republic Połaniec suffered badly in the 1934 floods. Połaniec had a large Jewish population, who were murdered in the Holocaust by the German occupiers during World War II. In 1939, the Polish resistance organized a collection and shipping point for aid packages for Poles who had lost their homes and possessions in other regions, i.e. those arrested or expelled by the Germans and those fleeing Soviet-occupied eastern Poland. A smuggling point for Polish underground press was based in the town.

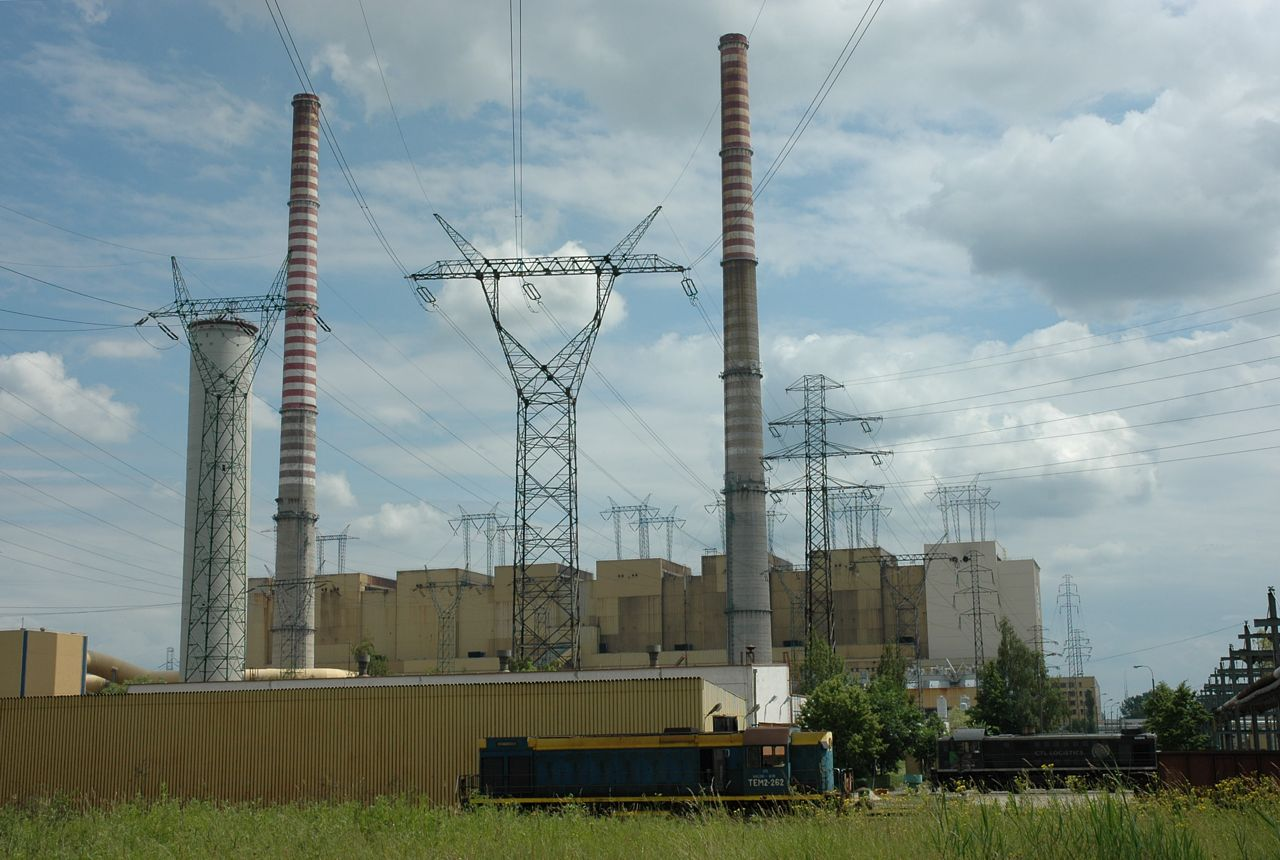
Połaniec Power Plant

In the 1970s, the Tadeusz Kościuszko Power Plant was built, and in 1980, Połaniec regained its town rights.

== International relations ==
=== Twin towns – sister cities ===
Połaniec is twinned with:

- Étoile-sur-Rhône, France (2004)
- Šalčininkai, Lithuania (2001)
- Stará Ľubovňa, Slovakia (1999)
- Svaliava, Ukraine (2005)
- Viggiano, Italy (2001)
- Vonitsa, Greece (2001)
