= Monuments of national significance in Chernivtsi Oblast =

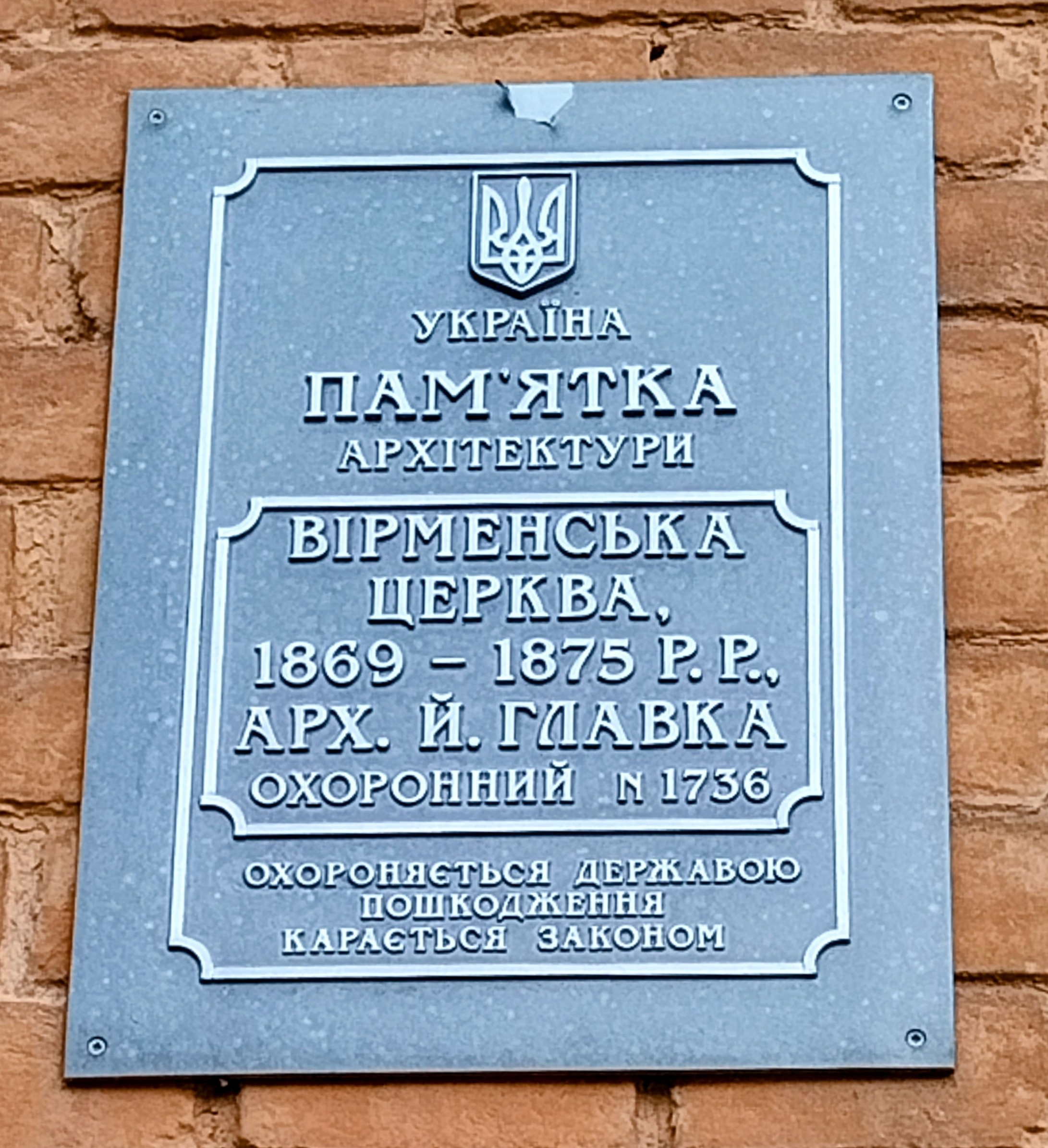
Cultural heritage plaque of the Armenian Church in Chernivtsi

The State Register of Immovable Monuments of Ukraine classifies cultural heritage monuments as either of local or national significance. (Note: 'Monuments of national significance' may also be translated as 'monuments of national importance'; Ukrainian: пам'ятки національного значення) To be classified as nationally significant, a monument must have had a substantial impact on Ukraine's culture, been associated with major historical events or individuals who shaped national culture, represented a masterpiece of creative genius, or embodied a disappeared civilisation or a disappeared artistic style. Monuments of national significance are inscribed on the register by the Cabinet of Ministers, and are protected and maintained by the Ministry of Culture. All listed monuments belong to at least one of the following categories: archaeology, history, monumental art, architecture, urban planning, garden and park art, landscape, or science and technology. (Note: The categories are defined as such: Archaeological monuments are underground or underwater remains of human activity that bear testimony to the origin or development of civilisation.; Historic monuments are buildings, structures, burials, and other sites associated with important historical events or the lives and activities of prominent individuals.; Monuments of monumental art are works of fine art.; Architectural monuments are buildings and structures that retain full or partial authenticity and express characteristics of a particular culture, era, style, construction technique, or represent works of renowned architects.; Urban planning monuments are historic neighbourhoods, streets, squares, or ensembles with preserved spatial layouts and architectural integrity.; Monuments of garden and park art combine park construction with natural or anthropogenic landscapes.; Landscape monuments are natural areas possessing historical value.; Monuments of science and technology are industrial, engineering, or scientific sites that reflect the scientific and technological development of an era or discipline.)

The first attempts to establish registers of protected buildings were undertaken in 1917 and 1918 by the Ukrainian People's Republic. These efforts continued in the 1920s in Soviet Ukraine, culminating in the listing of thousands of monuments, but were halted in the 1930s with the dissolution of relevant institutions and the active destruction of cultural—particularly religious—heritage. The listing of cultural heritage monuments in the region was renewed in 1956. A list of architectural monuments was approved in 1963, followed by a separate list of artistic, historic, and archaeological monuments in 1965. Both lists remained in use after Ukraine declared independence in 1991. On 8 June 2000, the State Register of Immovable Monuments was established with the adoption of the law On the Protection of Cultural Heritage. All entries from the Soviet-era list of artistic, historic, and archaeological monuments were transferred to the new register on 14 September 2009. The transfer of monuments from the Soviet architectural register, however, has proceeded more slowly and remains incomplete as of 2026, although the process has accelerated in recent years. At the same time, a number of sites have been deprived of their protected status to comply with decommunisation and derussification laws in effect since 2015 and 2023, respectively.

Chernivtsi Oblast, Ukraine's smallest oblast by area and population, is located in western Ukraine and contains 110 monuments of national significance. (Note: One monument of national significance in the oblast remains on the Soviet-era register: the wooden Trinity Church from Klokuchka, which is no longer located in the region as it was moved to Shevchenkivskyi Hai, a museum of folk architecture in Lviv. This site is not included in this list.) It is divided into three raions (districts) – Chernivtsi, Dniester, and Vyzhnytsia – which include 67, 32, and 11 monuments of national significance, respectively. Of the total, 92 are classified as architectural monuments, 31 as archaeological, 16 as historic, 12 as monumental art, 12 as urban planning, and 1 as garden and park art, with 18 monuments belonging to multiple categories. Most of the architectural monuments date from the 18th to the 19th centuries. The latest inscriptions date to July 2025. One monument—the Residence of Bukovinian and Dalmatian Metropolitans—is also designated as a World Heritage Site.

== Chernivtsi Raion ==
Monuments of national significance in Chernivtsi Raion
Name (Note: The names listed are unofficial translations as the register is only available in Ukrainian. The official Ukrainian names are shown below each translation, with links to the corresponding Ukrainian Wikipedia articles if applicable.)	Location	Date constructed (Note: Datings of the monuments as indicated on the register)	Date designated (Note: For monuments previously listed on a Soviet-era register, the date of transfer to the modern register is indicated.)	Coordinates	Type	Protection number (Note: Every monument is assigned a unique protection number, and those of national significance located in Chernivtsi Oblast start with the digits 24.)	Photo	Ref.
Church of the Nativity of the Theotokos and bell tower Церква Різдва Богородиці та дзвіниця	Bairaky	1646, 18th century	21 July 2025	48.11705°N 26.11702°E	Architectural	240098	More images	
Cave dwelling with rock art Печерна стоянка з наскельними зображеннями	Balamutivka	9th–7th millennia BCE	14 September 2009	48.54303°N 26.07373°E	Archaeological	240005-Н	More images	
St Nicholas Church and bell tower (wooden) Миколаївська церква та дзвіниця (дер.)	Berehomet	1786	21 July 2025	48.36655°N 25.69119°E	Architectural	240116	More images	
Settlement Поселення	Bila	5th–9th centuries	14 September 2009	48.31376°N 25.87597°E	Archaeological	240015-Н		
Church (wooden) Церква (дер.)	Bila Krynytsia	18th century	25 January 2023	47.97582°N 25.88476°E	Architectural	240043-Н	More images	
Old Believers' Cathedral Собор старообрядців	Bila Krynytsia	1906	25 January 2023	47.97693°N 25.88349°E	Architectural	240044-Н	More images	
St Demetrius Church (wooden) Димитрівська церква (дер.)	Bukivka	18th century	21 July 2025	48.04801°N 26.09967°E	Architectural	240125	More images	
Building where the poet O. Y. Kobylianska lived Будинок, у якому жила письменниця О. Ю. Кобилянська	Chernivtsi	Late 18th – early 19th centuries	14 September 2009	48.28485°N 25.94272°E	Historic	240001-Н	More images	
Grave of the writer O. Y. Kobylianska Могила письменниці О. Ю. Кобилянської	Chernivtsi	1942	14 September 2009	48.29195°N 25.96083°E	Historic	240002-Н	More images	
Grave of the writer and public figure Y. A. Fedkovych Могила письменника і громадського діяча Ю. А. Федьковича	Chernivtsi	1888	14 September 2009	48.29359°N 25.95962°E	Historic	240003-Н	More images	
Residence of Bukovinian and Dalmatian Metropolitans Резиденція митрополитів Буковини та Далмації	Chernivtsi	1866–1874	25 January 2023	48.29664°N 25.92492°E	Architectural	240019-Н	More images	
Metropolitan building Митрополичий корпус	Chernivtsi	1866	25 January 2023	48.29717°N 25.92431°E	Architectural	240019-Н/1	More images	
Seminary building Семінарський корпус	Chernivtsi	1870	25 January 2023	48.29609°N 25.92394°E	Architectural	240019-Н/2	More images	
Seminary church Семінарська церква	Chernivtsi	1878	25 January 2023	48.29631°N 25.92445°E	Architectural	240019-Н/3	More images	
Visitors' building Будинок для приїжджих	Chernivtsi	1874	25 January 2023	48.29702°N 25.92533°E	Architectural	240019-Н/4	More images	
Park and park structures Парк та паркові споруди	Chernivtsi	1874	25 January 2023	48.29799°N 25.92292°E	Architectural, garden and park art	240019-Н/5	More images	
Ascension Church and bell tower (wooden) Вознесенська церква та дзвіниця (дер.)	Chernivtsi	17th century	21 July 2025	48.27663°N 25.99933°E	Architectural	240129	More images	
St Nicholas Church (wooden) Миколаївська церква (дер.)	Chernivtsi	1607	21 July 2025	48.29217°N 25.94390°E	Architectural	240130	More images	
Palace of Justice Палац юстиції	Chernivtsi	1906	21 July 2025	48.29083°N 25.93261°E	Architectural	240131	More images	
Dormition Church and bell tower (wooden) in Kolychanka Успенська церква та дзвіниця (дер.) у Количанці	Chernivtsi	1783	21 July 2025	48.29587°N 25.96075°E	Architectural	240132	More images	
St Spyridon Church and bell tower (wooden) Спиридонівська церква та дзвіниця (дер.)	Chernivtsi	1773	21 July 2025	48.36185°N 25.96752°E	Architectural	240133	More images	
Olha Kobylianska Ukrainian Music and Drama Theatre Український музично-драматичний театр імені Ольги Кобилянської	Chernivtsi	1905	21 July 2025	48.29177°N 25.93100°E	Architectural	240134	More images	
Church of the Nativity and bell tower in Horecha Церква Різдва та дзвіниця у Горечі	Chernivtsi	1767	21 July 2025	48.28957°N 25.99044°E	Architectural	240135	More images	
Armenian Church Вірменська церква	Chernivtsi	1860	21 July 2025	48.28880°N 25.93904°E	Architectural	240136	More images	
City Hall Ратуша	Chernivtsi	1847	21 July 2025	48.29157°N 25.93488°E	Architectural	240137	More images	
Administrative building (Note: The building was originally constructed for the Bukovina Savings Bank and now houses the Chernivtsi Regional Art Museum.) Адміністративний будинок	Chernivtsi	1901	21 July 2025	48.29180°N 25.93421°E	Architectural	240138	More images	
Kurgan cemetery Курганний могильник	Chornivka	9th–13th centuries	14 September 2009	48.40527°N 26.00832°E	Archaeological	240016-Н		
Dormition Church and bell tower (wooden) Успенська церква та дзвіниця (дер.)	Dubivtsi	1775	21 July 2025	48.35257°N 25.71443°E	Architectural	240114	More images	
St Spyridon's Church and gate Спиридонівська церква та брама	Hertsa	1807	21 July 2025	48.14725°N 26.26286°E	Architectural	240097	More images	
Dormition Church Успенська церква	Hlynytsia	1786	21 July 2025	48.33353°N 25.70356°E	Architectural	240113	More images	
Hillfort "Zamok" Городище "Замок"	Horbova	9th–13th centuries	14 September 2009	48.20039°N 26.17501°E	Archaeological	240004-Н		
Hillfort Городище	Horishni Sherivtsi	9th–13th centuries	14 September 2009	48.39513°N 25.94291°E	Archaeological	240007-Н		
Kurgan cemetery Курганний могильник	Horishni Sherivtsi	9th–13th centuries	14 September 2009	48.39684°N 25.96065°E	Archaeological	240008-Н		
Church of the Nativity of the Theotokos (wooden) Церква Різдва Богородиці (дер.)	Ivankivtsi	1794	21 July 2025	48.45036°N 25.66981°E	Architectural	240108	More images	
St John the Evangelist Church Іоано-Богословська церква	Khreshchatyk	1765–1768	21 July 2025	48.63917°N 25.75155°E	Architectural	240106/1	More images	
Bell tower with a chapel Дзвіниця з каплицею	Khreshchatyk	17th century	21 July 2025	48.63858°N 25.75116°E	Architectural	240106/2	More images	
Annunciation Church (wooden) and bell tower Благовіщенська церква (дер.) та дзвіниця	Krupianske	1772	21 July 2025	48.16316°N 26.07596°E	Architectural	240096	More images	
Dormition Church (wooden) and bell tower Успенська церква (дер.) та дзвіниця	Kulivtsi	1779	21 July 2025	48.63388°N 25.83025°E	Architectural	240104	More images	
St Demeterius Church and gate with a bell tower Дмитрівська церква (дер.) та брама з дзвіницею	Lukovytsia	1757	21 July 2025	48.19988°N 26.07372°E	Architectural	240128	More images	
Ascension Church and bell tower Вознесенська церква та дзвіниця	Luzhany	15th century	21 July 2025	48.36362°N 25.77812°E	Architectural	240115	More images	
Trinity Church Троїцька церква	Mahala	1818	21 July 2025	48.29665°N 26.03673°E	Architectural	240112	More images	
All Saints Church Всесвятська церква	Mala Buda	1818	21 July 2025	48.16557°N 26.11131°E	Architectural	240119	More images	
Settlement and grave field Поселення і могильник ґрунтовий	Malyi Kuchuriv	9th century BCE – 4th century CE, 9th–13th centuries	14 September 2009	48.47138°N 25.91009°E	Archaeological	240009-Н		
Dormition Church Успенська церква	Mohylivka	17th century	21 July 2025	48.14293°N 26.27720°E	Architectural	240099	More images	
Dormition Church and bell tower Успенська церква та дзвіниця	Orshivtsi	1850	21 July 2025	48.42237°N 25.62847°E	Architectural	240117	More images	
St Constantine's Church and bell tower (wooden) Костянтинівська церква та дзвіниця (дер.)	Oshykhliby	1779	21 July 2025	48.42700°N 25.69956°E	Architectural	240109	More images	
Archangel's Church (wooden) Архангельська церква (дер.)	Petrashivka	1663	21 July 2025	48.10107°N 26.10157°E	Architectural	240100	More images	
Exaltation of the Holy Cross Church (wooden) Здвиженська церква (дер.)	Pidvalne	1561	21 July 2025	48.13569°N 26.14224°E	Architectural	240101	More images	
St Nicholas Church and bell tower (wooden) Миколаївська церква та дзвіниця (дер.)	Poliana	1618	21 July 2025	48.05293°N 26.11098°E	Architectural	240123	More images	
Intercession Church and bell tower Покровська церква та дзвіниця	Repuzhyntsi	1791	21 July 2025	48.65021°N 25.78920°E	Architectural	240105	More images	
Hillfort-sanctuary Городище-святилище	Rzhavyntsi	9th century BCE–4th century CE, 9th–13th centuries	14 September 2009	—	Archaeological	240010-Н		
Church of the Nativity Церква Різдва	Shypyntsi	1812	21 July 2025	48.37125°N 25.75318°E	Architectural	240110	More images	
St Michael's Church (wooden) Михайлівська церква (дер.)	Stara Zhadova	1806	21 July 2025	48.20543°N 25.51710°E	Architectural	240121	More images	
St Demetrius Church Дмитрівська церква	Ternavka	1811	21 July 2025	48.12250°N 26.22220°E	Architectural	240102	More images	
St Elijah's Church, bell tower, and fence Іллінська церква, дзвіниця та огорожа	Toporivtsi	1560, 16th century	21 July 2025	48.38073°N 26.08416°E	Architectural	240127	More images	
Archangel's Church (wooden) Архангельська церква (дер.)	Tsuren	1796	21 July 2025	48.23771°N 26.10247°E	Architectural	240120	More images	
Dormition Church Успенська церква	Turiatka	1718	21 July 2025	48.04118°N 26.14409°E	Architectural	240124	More images	
Intercession Church and bell tower Успенська церква та дзвіниця (дер.)	Valiava	1778, 19th century	21 July 2025	48.43507°N 25.83569°E	Architectural	240107	More images	
Hillfort Городище	Vasyliv	9th–7th millennia BCE	14 September 2009	48.60235°N 25.83422°E	Archaeological	240006-Н		
Church of the Nativity of the Theotokos Церква Різдва Богородиці	Vasyliv	1835	21 July 2025	48.60241°N 25.84050°E	Architectural	240103	More images	
Dormition Church Успенська церква	Velyka Buda	1794	21 July 2025	48.15514°N 26.08799°E	Architectural	240118	More images	
Dormition Church (wooden) Успенська церква (дер.)	Verenchanka	1794	21 July 2025	48.54152°N 25.74788°E	Architectural	240093	More images	
Exaltation of the Holy Cross Church (wooden) Хрестовоздвиженська церква (дер.)	Verkhni Synivtsi	1790	21 July 2025	48.00894°N 26.11596°E	Architectural	240126	More images	
St John's Church Іоанівська церква	Vikno	1826	21 July 2025	48.57437°N 25.96959°E	Architectural	240094	More images	
Palace Палац	Vikno	1809	21 July 2025	48.57534°N 25.96869°E	Architectural	240095	More images	
Intercession Church and bell tower (wooden) Покровська церква та дзвіниця (дер.)	Yaseny	17th century	21 July 2025	48.27966°N 25.66633°E	Architectural	240122	More images	
Church of the Nativity Церква Різдва	Zveniachyn	1797	21 July 2025	48.62660°N 25.72690°E	Architectural	240111	More images	

== Dniester Raion ==
Monuments of national significance in Dniester Raion
Name	Location	Date constructed	Date designated	Coordinates	Type	Protection number	Photo	Ref.
Earthen fortification "Trajan's Wall" Земляне укріплення "Траянів вал"	Anadoly, Khotyn	9th century BCE – 4th century CE	14 September 2009	48.50742°N 26.51112°E	Archaeological	240018-Н	More images	
St Demetrius Church and bell tower (wooden) Димитрівська церква та дзвіниця (дер.)	Bilousivka	1794, 1894	21 July 2025	48.52928°N 27.33928°E	Architectural	240092	More images	
Earthen fortification "Trajan's Wall" Земляне укріплення "Траянів вал"	Hrushivtsi	9th century BCE – 4th century CE	14 September 2009	48.50742°N 26.51112°E	Archaeological	240012-Н	More images	
Building complex of the Khotyn Fortress Комплекс споруд Хотинської фортеці	Khotyn	13th–19th centuries	25 January 2023	48.52154°N 26.49868°E	Archaeological, architectural, historic, monumental art, urban planning	240081-Н	More images	
Fortification walls of the castle Оборонні мури замку	Khotyn	13th–19th centuries	25 January 2023	—	Archaeological, architectural, historic, monumental art, urban planning	240081-Н/1	More images	
North Tower of the castle Північна башта замку	Khotyn	14th–19th centuries	25 January 2023	—	Archaeological, architectural, historic, monumental art, urban planning	240081-Н/2	More images	
West (Command) Tower of the castle Західна (Комендантська) башта замку	Khotyn	15th–16th centuries	25 January 2023	—	Archaeological, architectural, historic, monumental art, urban planning	240081-Н/3	More images	
East Tower of the castle Східна башта замку	Khotyn	15th–16th centuries	25 January 2023	—	Archaeological, architectural, historic, monumental art, urban planning	240081-Н/4	More images	
Southeast Tower of the castle (ruins) Південно-східна башта замку (руїни)	Khotyn	15th–16th centuries	25 January 2023	—	Archaeological, architectural, historic, monumental art, urban planning	240081-Н/5	More images	
Southwest Tower of the castle Південно-західна башта замку	Khotyn	15th–18th centuries	25 January 2023	—	Archaeological, architectural, historic, monumental art, urban planning	240081-Н/6	More images	
South (Entrance) Tower of the castle (with bridges) Південна (В'їзна) башта замку (з мостами)	Khotyn	18th–19th centuries	25 January 2023	—	Archaeological, architectural, historic, monumental art, urban planning	240081-Н/7	More images	
Commandant's Palace of the castle (Artillery warehouses) Комендантський палац замку (Артилерійські магазейни)	Khotyn	15th–19th centuries	25 January 2023	—	Archaeological, architectural, historic, monumental art, urban planning	240081-Н/8	More images	
Castle church (mosque) Замкова церква (мечеть)	Khotyn	15th–18th centuries	25 January 2023	—	Archaeological, architectural, historic, monumental art, urban planning	240081-Н/9	More images	
Castle barracks (Artillery arsenal) Казарма замку (Артилерійський цейхгауз)	Khotyn	15th–19th centuries	25 January 2023	—	Archaeological, architectural, historic, monumental art, urban planning	240081-Н/10	More images	
Castle well Замкова криниця	Khotyn	15th–18th centuries	25 January 2023	—	Archaeological, architectural, historic, monumental art, urban planning	240081-Н/11	More images	
Pârcălab's House of the castle (Artillery warehouses) (ruins) Будинок пиркелаба замку (Артилерійські магазейни) (руїни)	Khotyn	15th–18th centuries	25 January 2023	—	Archaeological, architectural	240081-Н/12	More images	
Bastions with ramparts and escarpments of the new fortress Бастіони з валами та ескарпами нової фортеці	Khotyn	18th century	25 January 2023	—	Architectural	240081-Н/13	More images	
Bender (Istanbul, Constantinople) Gate of the new fortress Бендерська (Стамбульська, Константинопольська) брама нової фортеці	Khotyn	18th century	25 January 2023	—	Architectural	240081-Н/14	More images	
Iași (Timișoara, Yeniçeri, Izmail) Gate of the new fortress Ясська брама (Тимішоарська брама. Яничарські ворота. Ізмаїльські ворота) нової фортеці	Khotyn	18th century	25 January 2023	—	Architectural	240081-Н/15	More images	
Podillian (Dniester) Gate of the new fortress Подільська брама (Дністровські ворота) нової фортеці	Khotyn	18th century	25 January 2023	—	Architectural	240081-Н/16	More images	
Kamianets (Secret) Gate (Anadoly Gate) of the new fortress Кам'янецька (Потайна) брама (Анадольські ворота) нової фортеці	Khotyn	18th century	25 January 2023	—	Architectural	240081-Н/17	More images	
Tower above the moat of the new fortress (ruins) Башта над потоком нової фортеці (руїни)	Khotyn	18th century	25 January 2023	—	Archaeological, architectural	240081-Н/18	More images	
East Tower of the new fortress (ruins) Східна башта нової фортеці (руїни)	Khotyn	18th century	25 January 2023	—	Architectural	240081-Н/19	More images	
Valide Sultan Mosque of the new fortress (ruins) Мечеть валіде-султан нової фортеці (руїни)	Khotyn	18th–19th centuries	25 January 2023	—	Archaeological, architectural	240081-Н/20	More images	
Bridge over the moat of the new fortress Міст через потік нової фортеці	Khotyn	18th–19th centuries	25 January 2023	—	Architectural	240081-Н/21	More images	
Well near the Bender Gate of the new fortress (ruins) Криниця біля Бендерської брами нової фортеці (руїни)	Khotyn	18th–19th centuries	25 January 2023	—	Archaeological, architectural	240081-Н/22	More images	
Ruthenian Gate of the new fortress (ruins) Руська брама нової фортеці (руїни)	Khotyn	19th century	25 January 2023	—	Archaeological, architectural	240081-Н/23	More images	
Garrison workshops (Engineering workshops, Engineering office, Parochial school) of the new fortress Гарнізонні майстерні (Інженерні майстерні, Інженерна канцелярія, Церковно-приходська школа) нової фортеці	Khotyn	19th century	25 January 2023	—	Architectural	240081-Н/24	More images	
Church of St Alexander Nevsky Церква св. Олександра Невського	Khotyn	1833–1834	25 January 2023	—	Architectural	240081-Н/25	More images	
Hillfort "Turetskyi Shanets" Городище "Турецький шанець"	Lenkivtsi	9th–13th centuries	14 September 2009	48.51279°N 26.76775°E	Archaeological	240011-Н		
Earthen fortification "Trajan's Wall" Земляне укріплення "Траянів вал"	Makarivka	9th century BCE – 4th century CE	14 September 2009	48.57564°N 26.73917°E	Archaeological	240014-Н		
Earthen fortification "Trajan's Wall" Земляне укріплення "Траянів вал"	Voronovytsia	9th century BCE – 4th century CE	14 September 2009	48.55114°N 26.65293°E	Archaeological	240013-Н		

== Vyzhnytsia Raion ==
Monuments of national significance in Vyzhnytsia Raion
Name	Location	Date constructed	Date designated	Coordinates	Type	Protection number	Photo	Ref.
St Demetrius Church (wooden) Димитрівська церква (дер.)	Dykhtynets	1871	21 July 2025	48.05651°N 25.04409°E	Architectural	240087	More images	
St Basil's Church (wooden) Василівська церква (дер.)	Koniatyn	1790	21 July 2025	48.04188°N 24.94420°E	Architectural	240085	More images	
Church and bell tower (wooden) Церква та дзвіниця (дер.)	Nyzhni Stanivtsi	1794	21 July 2025	48.32327°N 25.57473°E	Architectural	240082	More images	
Cave where Oleksa Dovbush and his opryshky resided Печера, у якій перебував Олекса Довбуш з опришками	Pidzakharychi	1730s–1740s	14 September 2009	48.21769°N 25.13053°E	Historic	240017-Н	More images	
Dormition Church (wooden) Успенська церква (дер.)	Putyla	1885	21 July 2025	48.00073°N 25.08446°E	Architectural	240086	More images	
Dormition Church and bell tower (wooden) Успенська церква та дзвіниця (дер.)	Roztoky	1846	21 July 2025	48.17716°N 25.09800°E	Architectural	240090	More images	
Church of the Nativity of the Theotokos and bell tower (wooden) Церква Різдва Богородиці та дзвіниця (дер.)	Seliatyn	17th century	21 July 2025	47.88453°N 25.21872°E	Architectural	240088	More images	
St Elijah's Church and bell tower (wooden) Іллінська церква та дзвіниця (дер.)	Shepit	1898	21 July 2025	47.79929°N 25.15348°E	Architectural	240089	More images	
Church of St Paraskeva and bell tower (wooden) Церква Параскеви та дзвіниця (дер.)	Ust-Putyla	1881	21 July 2025	48.10924°N 25.04187°E	Architectural	240091	More images	
St Nicholas Church (wooden) Миколаївська церква (дер.)	Voloka	1784	21 July 2025	48.33023°N 25.53355°E	Architectural	240083	More images	
Church of St John of Suceava (wooden) and bell tower Церква Івана Сучавського (дер.) та дзвіниця	Vyzhenka	1792	21 July 2025	48.22548°N 25.17168°E	Architectural	240084	More images	

== See also ==
- List of historic reserves in Ukraine
- Ukrainian architecture
