= Ukrainian Workers' Party of Romania =

Ukrainian Workers' Party of Romania Vyzvolennia Партія українських працюючих Румунії Визволення
- Secretary: Ivan Stasiuk
- Founded: 1929
- Banned: 1934
- Newspaper: Borets
- Ideology: Ukrainian minority rights Leninism; Left-wing nationalism (Ukrainian); Separatism
- Political position: Left-wing to Far-left
- National affiliation: Worker-Peasant Bloc

The Ukrainian Workers' Party of Romania (Ukrainian: Партія українських працюючих Румунії,Romanian: Partidul muncitorilor ucrainieni din România), also known as Vyzvolennia (Ukrainian: Визволення, "Liberation"; Romanian: Vîzvolenia), was a Romanian left-wing political organisation active primarily in northern Bukovina during the interwar period. Founded in 1929 by former members of the Ukrainian section of the International Social Democratic Party, the party sought to promote workers' and minority rights, advocating for land reform, nationalisation of industries, and the restoration of Ukrainian cultural and linguistic rights. Its ultimate goal was the unification of Ukrainian-majority areas in Romania with Soviet Ukraine.

Closely linked to the Worker-Peasant Bloc, a front for the banned Communist Party of Romania (PCR), Vyzvolennia gained significant traction in the 1930 and 1931 elections. It secured multiple local council, mayor, and deputy mayor positions and elected Vasyl Kashul to the Romanian Parliament. However, Romanian authorities annulled these mandates, dissolved the councils, and intensified repression. The government escalated its crackdown through mass arrests, surveillance, and, in 1933, the imposition of a state of siege in Bukovina, which disorganised the party's operations. Efforts to reorganise under a new leadership proved unsuccessful due to internal divisions, betrayals by informants, and continuous police raids. By 1934, Vyzvolennia was officially banned, and its activities came to an end.

== History ==
=== Founding and early years ===
The origins of Vyzvolennia can be traced back to the underground activities of the Communist Party of Bukovina (KPB). Founded in November 1918 as part of the Communist Party (Bolsheviks) of Ukraine (KP(b)U), the KPB operated clandestinely and went through a period of stagnation before being reactivated by mid 1925. During this revival, the KPB infiltrated various leftist organisations, including the Ukrainian section of Bukovina's International Social Democratic Party (ISDP) and its affiliated sports association, Volia (Ukrainian: Воля, "The Will"). Many key figures within the Ukrainian section of the ISDP, including Vasyl Rusnak, the section's secretary, Ivan Stasiuk, the editor of the section's journal Borotba (Ukrainian: Боротьба, "The Struggle"), and Semen Halytskyi, were actively involved in this underground network, serving in the KPB Central Committee since July 1926. In response to a request from the Comintern, the KPB subordinated itself to the Communist Party of Romania (PCR) in May 1927, becoming the Bukovina Regional Committee of the PCR.

Tensions within the ISDP came to a head during the lead-up to the 1928 Romanian general election. The Romanian Social Democratic Party (PSD), with which the ISDP had been an autonomous section since 1927, decided to form a joint electoral list with the ruling National Peasants' Party (PNȚ). Under this agreement, the list was to include Constantin Krakalia, a former Ukrainian ISDP member and MP who had defected to the PNȚ. This decision provoked outrage within the ISDP's Ukrainian section, which viewed Krakalia as "a traitor to the cause of socialism." Refusing to run alongside him, the Ukrainian section broke away from the ISDP on 23 November 1928, during the party's regional conference. Approximately 1,000 Ukrainian members, led by Stasiuk, Halytskyi, Karl Terletskyi, and Vasyl Hotynchan, aligned themselves with the Worker-Peasant Bloc (BMȚ), a front organisation for banned PCR. Several of these members stood as regional candidates for the BMȚ in the 1928 elections. At the end of November, the Regional Committee of the PCR, in a meeting with Central Committee representative Dori Goldstein, decided to create a legal mass organisation for Ukrainians in Bukovina.

The Ukrainian Workers' Party of Romania was officially established on 17 February 1929 at a conference in Cernăuți (Chernivtsi) by former ISDP members, many of whom had ties to the KPB. The new organisation also attracted left-wing members from Krakalia's Ukrainian Peasant Party. The conference, coordinated by Halytskyi, Goldstein, and Stasiuk, gathered 63 delegates from 27 ISDP sections and 18 guests. Additional participants were expected but could not attend due to poor weather. In its inaugural manifesto, the party declared itself the successor to the Ukrainian section of the ISDP, which had been active in Bukovina since 1905. The conference elected a central committee of 21 members, chaired by M. Kovalchuk, and appointed Ivan Stasiuk as secretary and editor of the party’s newspaper, Borets (Ukrainian: Борець, "The Fighter"). Borets was seen as a continuation of Borotba, which had been banned in November 1928. Its first issue was published in Bucharest on 31 March 1929, as local printing presses were barred by the police from handling the publication despite official authorisation. Subsequently, 22 more issues were printed at the Unirea printing house in Cernăuți. Funding for Borets had been secured by Halytskyi, then serving as secretary of the KPB, through financial support from the Sel-Rob.

By December 1929, the party had established its headquarters on Ion Creangă Street (currently Sahaidachnoho Street) in Cernăuți. Vyzvolennia explicitly excluded from its membership "non-working elements," such as priests, gendarmes, factory owners, innkeepers, and kulaks. However, membership was open to non-Ukrainians who agreed to "voluntarily assume the duties of a member of the entire Party." By June 1931 the Regional Police Directorate reported that the party had 9,000 supporters in Cernăuți County, 3,000 in Storojineț County, 1,000 in Rădăuți County, 200 in Câmpulung County, and 50 in Suceava county. According to National Liberal politician Gheorghe Vântu, the party's success could be attributed to widespread unemployment and the prevailing lawlessness in Bukovina under the PNȚ regime, as well as to propaganda by "foreign elements."

The creation of Vyzvolennia attracted support both from the PCR and the Comintern. Thus, in a March 1929 issue of Înainte, the PCR welcomed it as a party fighting for the economic and social liberation of Ukrainian workers from the "yoke of Romanian boyars", while the Executive Committee of the Communist International endorsed its activity in an August 1930 resolution. According to Romanian police reports, the creation of Vyzvolennia was also welcomed by Ukrainian émigré organisations in North America, which formed a committee to provide financial support to the party. By 1931, the police identified Ukrainian left-wing organisations in North America—particularly in Winnipeg, Canada—and the local section of the International Red Aid as the party’s primary sources of funding.

In 1929, Vyzvolennia played a prominent role in organising a May Day rally in the public park of Cernăuți, which drew up to 12,000 participants and effectively paralysed the city. Speakers demanded disarmament, an eight-hour workday, democratic reforms, equal rights for all ethnic groups, and amnesty for political prisoners. While the Romanian secret police (Siguranța) confiscated 661 copies of Borets "containing subversive propaganda" before the event, the party successfully distributed the newspaper during other occasions, such as its November 1929 issue commemorating the October Revolution. On the same day public meetings took place in Storojineț (Storozhynets), Falcău (Falkiv) and Bеrhomet pe Siret (Berehomet), with another major May Day rally being organised in Adâncata (Hlyboka), where party activists Sydir Lupulyak and Nestor Tkachuk called for land redistribution, improved working conditions, and full cultural and national rights for Ukrainians. Other speakers during the various rallies across Bukovina included Kovalchuk, Terletskyi, Halytskyi, Stasiuk and L. Goldenberg.

The party's growing influence prompted increased repression by the Romanian authorities. On 1 August 1929, 55 members of Vyzvolennia's sports association were arrested. On 13 December, two Vyzvolennia activists were arrested for plastering party leaflets in Cernăuți. Later that evening, two more activists were detained near the party's headquarters. During the operation, the Siguranța confiscated nine of the leaflets and discovered 20 more, along with a large cache of communist publications found at the home of one of the detainees. In January 1930, four activists, including Hotynchan, were sentenced by the Cernăuți district court to prison terms ranging from five to six months, which were later increased to 12 to 18 months upon the prosecutor's request. On 24 December 1929, the police raided Vyzvolennia's headquarters again, arresting three members and conducting house searches that uncovered three hunting rifles, communist and socialist literature, and articles intended for publication in Înainte and Borets. Two of the arrested activists were eventually acquitted in February 1930, but the authorities maintained their pressure on the party's activities.

=== 1930 local elections ===
In preparation for the 1930 local elections, which took place in late February and early March, Vyzvolennia issued two manifestos: one independently and another jointly with the Worker-Peasant Bloc. The independent manifesto focused on practical measures for peasants, including state assistance with seeds, machinery, and livestock, interest-free loans, and relief for those affected by natural disasters. It also demanded the cancellation of peasant debts and a ban on housing speculation. The joint manifesto addressed broader political and social goals, such as combating fascism (including "social fascism"), improving workers' living conditions, and opposing preparations for an "imperialist war" against the Soviet Union. Specific demands included an eight-hour workday, affordable housing for the poor, free medical care, and better infrastructure for workers' suburbs, such as lighting, sewage systems, and water supply. Both manifestos emphasised that achieving these goals would require workers and peasants to unite against Romania’s "bourgeois" order. As the practical implementation of the land reform was still lagging behind, the manifestos also called for the redistribution of land from large landowners, the church, and the state to peasants, particularly landless ones, free of charge. In the days preceding the elections, Vyzvolennia and the Worker-Peasant Bloc highlighted their limited expectations for winning seats under the existing "bourgeois" order. The two organisations viewed local councils and the parliament not as tools for systemic change but as platforms to popularise their program among the masses.

During the elections, Vyzvolennia secured councillor positions in several villages, including Verbăuți (Verbivtsi), Iurcăuți (Yurkivtsi), Babin (Babyn) and Ianăuți (Ivanivtsi). It also won full control of the local councils in Oșehlib (Oshykhliby) and Doroșăuți (Doroshivtsi), where it elected key officials. T. Nykyforiuk became mayor of Oșehlib, while A. Melnik was elected mayor of Șipeniț (Shypyntsi). Overall, the Worker-Peasant Bloc secured 67 local councillors, eight mayors, and eight assistants mayors in Cernăuți County and 14 local councillors in Storojneț county. The Romanian authorities swiftly reacted to these electoral victories. Accusing the councillors of "conducting subversive propaganda directed against state and public order," the government dissolved the councils and arrested most of their members by 10 March 1930. In June 1930, the chief prosecutor dropped charges against A. Melnik and Vasyl Rusnak, and by July, the tribunal acquitted the remaining accused due to a lack of evidence.

The authorities also intensified their crackdown on Vyzvolennia's press and leadership. On 2 March, the police confiscated 964 copies of Borets and other party materials from the Frimet publishing house. On 7 March, they raided the home of Ivan Stasiuk, Secretary of the Central Committee of Vyzvolennia and editor of Borets. During the raid, electoral leaflets in both Ukrainian and Romanian were seized, including leaflets commemorating the October Revolution. Stasiuk, placed under arrest, admitted to printing 3,000 campaign leaflets, of which 2,000 had already been distributed in villages across the region. The investigation into Stasiuk lasted until 3 June. Prosecutors accused him of using his articles in Borets to glorify the Soviet Union and incite peasants "against state security" under the pretext of election campaigning. Ultimately, Stasiuk was convicted and sentenced to three years of imprisonment, fined 80,000 lei, and stripped of his civil rights for eight years. Around the same period, Romanian authorities also arrested eighteen Vyzvolennia activists in the villages of Verbăuți and Rarancea (Ridkivtsi). Most of the detainees were acquitted in July, though Vasyl Kravchuk was sentenced to four months of imprisonment and Hryhorii Kashul to three months. Overall, around 80 activists were arrested throughout the year according to an estimate by opposition politician Gheorghe Vântu. The organisation was further destabilised by factional struggles within the PCR between the Barbu and Luximin groups from mid 1929 to late 1930. This internal conflict weakened the communist leadership, allowing the Siguranța to uncover many of its underground groups. With its newspaper banned and much of its leadership imprisoned, Vyzvolennia went underground. The Comintern eventually intervened to resolve the disputes within the PCR, restoring some stability. Vyzvolennia began to show signs of revival in November 1930, with its activities expanding further in 1931 after Ivan Stasiuk was released from prison in June, following an amnesty granted on the occasion of the anniversary of King Carol II's return to the throne.

=== 1931 elections ===
In the early 1930s, Vyzvolennia commemorated revolutionary figures such as Vladimir Lenin, Karl Liebknecht, and Rosa Luxemburg. According to a 1931 report by the Romanian police, the organisation also began expanding its reach to other ethnic groups in Bukovina. To maintain the party’s Ukrainian orientation while accommodating these new recruits—primarily drawn from the dissolved Unitary trade unions and the Jewish youth organisation Morgenrot—Vyzvolennia established the Spartak sports association. This strategy enabled the party to extend its influence beyond its original base in Cernăuți and into other parts of Bukovina, though it had limited success in the southern regions, where the population was predominantly Romanian. However, the Romanian government also intensified its repression of the organisation. Prominent leaders, including Ivan Stasiuk and Dmytro Shelinako, were prosecuted, while other activists, such as Semen Halystky, faced ongoing persecution. The authorities conducted widespread raids across Ukrainian villages in Bukovina and banned the publication of Borets.

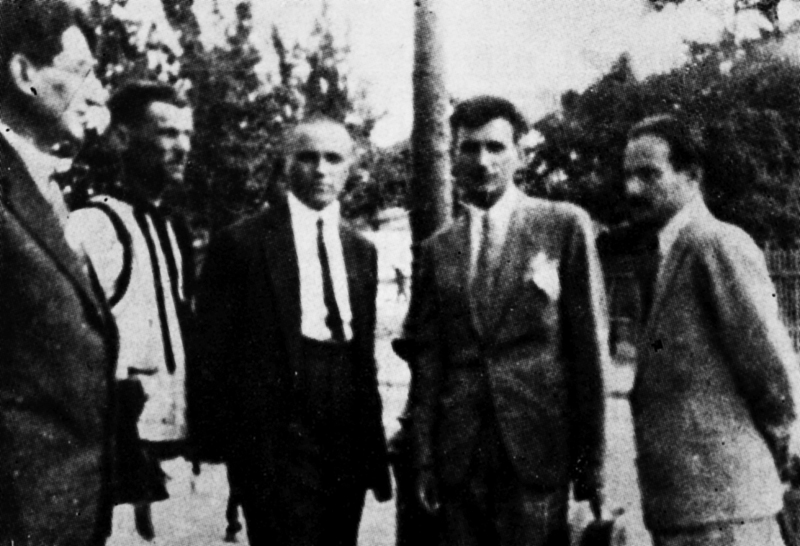
Vasyl Kashul (second from left) and the other deputies of the Workers and Peasants' Bloc elected in the 1931 Romanian parliamentary elections

Despite the challenges, Vyzvolennia, with the support of the regional PCR committee led by Halytskyi, managed to field candidates in three counties of northern Bukovina, including Cernăuți, during the 1931 Romanian general election. Running under the Worker-Peasant Bloc, the party presented a platform aimed at addressing the daily needs of workers and peasants. The Bloc's electoral manifesto called for a determined struggle against both overt and covert fascist rule, opposed preparations for an anti-Soviet war, and promoted the self-determination of national minorities, including their right to secession. Ultimately, it advocated for the establishment of workers' and peasants' power. Among the Bloc's candidates were prominent figures such as Lucrețiu Pătrășcanu, Vasyl Kashul, H. Picker, E. Soroftei, D. Vasylashko, and L. Goldenberg. In response to the Bloc’s campaign, Romanian authorities intensified their repression of the pro-communist movement. Police arrested 60 activists in Cernăuți (including Picker and Soroftei), 60 in Storojineț, 25 in Sadagura (Sadhora) and 7 more in Rarancea. Nevertheless, the Bloc received a total of 7,715 votes across the three Bukovina counties: 5,183 in Cernăuți, 2,059 in Storojineț and 473 in Rădăuți. The Bloc also performed well in other regions of Romania, ultimately electing five deputies to the Romanian Parliament, including Vasyl Kashul as the representative for Cernăuți. None of the elected candidates were allowed to serve, as the government invalidated their mandates on technical grounds. According to Romanian police reports, this electoral success was partly due to the appeal of the Bloc's name, "workers and peasants," which resonated with the broader working-class electorate. Additionally, a substantial portion of the support came from Ukrainian peasants who sympathised with Vyzvolennia's promotion of Ukrainian cultural and political aspirations.

Another wave of repression followed: by 30 June 1931, 253 party activists, including all candidates and their registered supporters, were brought to trial and sentenced to prison terms ranging from several months to five years. The distribution of those prosecuted by county included 156 from Cernăuți, 32 from Storojineț, 43 from Rădăuți, 19 from Câmpulung, and 3 from Suceava. Additionally, the police identified another 1,911 communist supporters in Bukovina, with most located in the city of Cernăuți and its surrounding areas. The authorities also launched an intense manhunt for Kashul, based on coerced confessions from two bandits who falsely claimed he was their accomplice.

=== Revival attempts and demise ===
Despite the repression, in a report to the Central Committee of KP(b)U in November 1931, Semen Halytskyi noted that the communists had completed a campaign to rebuild and reactivate Vyzvolennia that autumn. This revival was either short-lived or deemed unsatisfactory, as in 1932 the PCR instructed its regional committee to re-activate the organisation. A Provisional Bureau was appointed in March 1932 with a mandate to strengthen local structures, establish district-level committees, and prepare for the election of a Central Committee. The ultimate goal was to convene a congress for Vyzvolennia. The central leadership also shifted the party’s focus, assigning Vyzvolennia the task of promoting the Ukrainian national question, while leaving social issues to local PCR cells. This division of responsibilities, however, caused confusion within Bukovina's left-wing circles. Many supporters struggled to discern the respective roles of Vyzvolennia and the PCR, leading to organisational chaos. The Provisional Bureau achieved limited success, managing to establish only one district committee, in Vijnița (Vyzhnytsia), over the course of the year. According to Romanian historian Florin-Răzvan Mihai, the poor results stemmed partly from the peasants’ lack of interest in political engagement, as they were more concerned with agricultural work. Additionally, the geographical dispersion of its supporters hindered the party’s efforts to build a cohesive organisational structure.

The organisation faced another major setback in February 1933 when the Romanian government reintroduced a state of siege in Bukovina following a major railway strike. This measure led to the disorganisation of all Vyzvolennia and PCR district committees in the region. Despite these challenges, the PCR continued to support Vyzvolennia. In May 1933, the Central Committee instructed its Bukovina branch to bolster the party's influence among Ukrainian peasants and help transform it into "a truly mass organisation of the Ukrainian peasantry of occupied Bukovina." To revitalise Vyzvolennia, a new Provisional Bureau was appointed in the spring of 1933, comprising Vasyl Kashul, Petr Maga, and Vasyl Hotynchan, who had recently been released from prison in Cernăuți. The bureau was tasked with rebuilding the party’s structure, convening a regional conference, and reactivating branches and affiliated groups across all organisational levels. During this period, Vyzvolennia briefly managed to publish a new newspaper, Ukrainska Volia (Ukrainian: Українська воля, "Ukrainian Will"), though it produced only a single issue. However, the organisation suffered a significant blow on 10 May 1933 when Iulian Miroș, a member of the regional PCR committee, was arrested. Under interrogation, Miroș confessed to his involvement in underground communist activities and revealed the identities of nearly all the activists and regional party members he knew. He also exposed many Vyzvolennia activists and disclosed the location of the printing press used for Ukrainska Volya.

On 25 November 1934, the Romanian authorities finally banned Vyzvolennia, along with other organisations linked to the PCR, through an order of the commander of the Second Army. Forced underground, the party disbanded later that year. Nevertheless, according to Ukrainian scholar M.I. Ivanesko, the organisation played a pivotal role in creating a pro-communist current among Ukrainians in Bukovina. This shift contributed to the failure of the nationalist UNP in the 1937 Romanian general election, despite its alignment with a government-led bloc.

== Ideology and relations with other parties ==
Vyzvolennia was associated throughout its existence with the Worker-Peasant Bloc. Although it did not identify itself as a communist party, its objectives aligned closely with leftist ideologies. It called for the nationalisation of industries and banks, land redistribution from landlords and the church to peasants, the implementation of a seven-hour workday, and the cancellation of peasant debts. Vyzvolennia also championed cultural and linguistic rights for Ukrainians, criticising Romanianisation policies and demanding the establishment of Ukrainian-language schools in Bukovina. The ultimate objective was the social and national liberation of Bukovina through its unification with Soviet Ukraine, and the party press promoted a positive view of Soviet realities. Nevertheless, the party’s rhetoric underscored the need for solidarity among all of Romania’s working people, regardless of ethnicity, as the only path to liberation from exploitation. In early 1930, Vyzvolennia's press praised the PCR as the only party reflecting the fundamental interest of the working class and the poor peasants. By December 1931, the party's programme had become largely aligned with that of the PCR, with additional points addressing Bukovina's specific needs and the situation of minorities in the region. While continuing to advocate for Bukovina’s union with the Soviet Union, the organisation denounced Romania’s tax policies, which it claimed had devastated the local economy. It also criticised the agrarian reform, arguing that women were excluded from receiving land and that much of the redistributed land had been given to wealthy peasants, gendarmes, Romanian bureaucrats, and colonists. To broaden its support base, Vyzvolennia sought to attract Hutsuls, who had been severely affected by the collapse of the local wood-processing industry during the Great Depression. The organisation also targeted youth through an anti-militarist message, aiming to rally them to the party’s cause.

The party was highly critical of the National Peasants' Party government, accusing it of fostering paramilitary groups such as the Voinici and Chemăriști, modelled after Italian fascist Blackshirts, of enabling the Vlad Țepeș League and the Iron Guard, and of suppressing workers’ political and professional organisations. Vyzvolennia also condemned the nationalist Ukrainian National Party (UNP) for its collaboration with the government, including its support for tax hikes and the continued state of siege in Ukrainian regions, which the party viewed as direct insults to the Ukrainian people. The UNP was further criticised for its declarations of loyalty to a government that, in Vyzvolennia’s view, perpetuated the exploitation and oppression of Ukrainians. Similarly, the Romanian Social Democrats (PSD) were accused of betraying minority interests by aligning with the government’s stance on Ukrainian schools, effectively delaying their establishment while existing ones faced encroachment and Romanianisation. The PSD was also accused of denouncing Ukrainian revolutionary activists to the authorities. Vyzvolennia's critique extended to Ukrainian nationalist newspapers such as Chas, Ridny Krai, and Khliborobska Pratsa, accusing them of opportunism and pandering to whoever paid them better. Highlighting what it saw as the dangers of nationalism, Vyzvolennia condemned the attack by Ukrainian nationalist students on a Jewish temple in Șipeniț as evidence of the shared chauvinistic and fascist tendencies among nationalist movements.
