= Mytkiv =

Commune in Chernivtsi Oblast, Ukraine

Coordinates: 48°36′18″N 26°00′32″E

Mytkiv (Ukrainian: Митків; Romanian: Mitcău; German: Mitkeu) is a commune (selsoviet) in Chernivtsi Raion, Chernivtsi Oblast, Ukraine. It belongs to Vikno rural hromada, one of the hromadas of Ukraine.

Until 18 July 2020, Mytkiv belonged to Zastavna Raion. The raion was abolished in July 2020 as part of the administrative reform of Ukraine, which reduced the number of raions of Chernivtsi Oblast to three. The area of Zastavna Raion was merged into Chernivtsi Raion.
