= Mosorivka =

Commune in Chernivtsi Oblast, Ukraine

Mosorivka Мосорівка Mosoreni
- Interactive map of Mosorivka
- Location of Mosorivka in Ukraine Mosorivka (Ukraine)
- Coordinates: 48°37′27″N 26°2′17″E
- Country: Ukraine
- Oblast: Chernivtsi Oblast
- Raion: Chernivtsi Raion
- Hromada: Vikno rural hromada
- Elevation: 186 m (610 ft)

Population (2001)
  - Total: 311
- Time zone: UTC+2 (EET)
  - Summer (DST): UTC+3 (EEST)
- Postal code: 59401
- Area code: +380 3737
- KOATUU: 7321585801

Mosorivka (Ukrainian: Мосорівка; Romanian: Mosoreni) is a commune (selsoviet) in Chernivtsi Raion, Chernivtsi Oblast, Ukraine. It has 311 residents. It belongs to Vikno rural hromada, one of the hromadas of Ukraine.

Until 18 July 2020, Mosorivka belonged to Zastavna Raion. The raion was abolished in July 2020 as part of the administrative reform of Ukraine, which reduced the number of raions of Chernivtsi Oblast to three. The area of Zastavna Raion was merged into Chernivtsi Raion.
