= Communist Party of Bukovina =

Communist Party of Bukovina Partidul Comunist din Bucovina Комуністична партія Буковини
- Abbreviation: KPB
- Founded: November 1918
- Dissolved: 1926
- Merged into: Communist Party of Romania
- Ideology: Communism; Marxism-Leninism; Left-wing nationalism (Ukrainian); Separatism
- Political position: Far-left
- International affiliation: Comintern

The Communist Party of Bukovina (KPB) (in Ukrainian: Комуністична партія Буковини, КПБ, in Romanian: Partidul Comunist din Bucovina) was a clandestine political party in interwar Romania. Led by S. I. Kanyuk, its purpose was the secession of Bukovina from Romania and its unification with the Ukrainian SSR.

== History ==
The first communist cells in Bukovina arose in March — April 1917. In 1918, they expanded in Chernivtsi, Zastavna, Vyzhnytsia, Kitsman, Siret, Radautz, Suceava, Gura Humorului, Dorna Watra, Câmpulung Moldovenesc, Putyla, Vashkivtsi, Doroshivtsi, Stanivtsi and other places. At the beginning of November 1918 they united into the Communist Party of Bukovina. The Central Committee was elected, headed by Serhiy I. Kanyuk. A clandestine party, the CPB carried out significant agitation work among the workers and soldiers of Bukovina. The party also participated in the Khotyn Uprising.

In August 1919, the party joined the Comintern, regarding itself as the local Bukovina branch of the Soviet Communist Party. The party was clandestine, but operated under various legal front organizations. On March 17, 1921, the party began to publish its newspaper, called Hromada. The party received financial aid from the Communist Party of Ukraine and it had ties to with the clandestine Communist Party of Eastern Galicia in Poland. It had around 1,000 members in 1921. The same year, the Romanian authorities carried a series of arrests against the Bukovinan communists, confiscated newspapers (Socialistul and Lupta) in Rușii-Mănăstioara, Vama, Frasin, Stulpicani, Pojorâta and Iacobeni. The 1st May celebrations were authorized in Cernăuți, Vășcăuți, Storojineț, Zastavna, Vijnița and Rădăuți, with the conditions that no uprisings, socialist inscriptions or red flags may be used.

According to a 1922 document, the communist movement in the Kingdom of Romania – including Bukovina – had to be organised into 3 local committees: the main committee (which received direct instructions from the Comintern offices in Sofia and Vienna), the youth committee and the military committee. Moreover, a significant surge in espionage activities, carried out by both Soviet agents and Romanian communists, was documented in the region of Bukovina. This led to a trial in Cernăuți, where the following communists were prosecuted and imprisoned in August 1923 for crimes against the security of the Romanian State: Salamon Chigel, Alex Labici, Isidor Rosenwald, Priva Greissel, Vladimir Bihari, Jacob Wilner, and Arthur Preis.

In 1924, the Romanian authorities banned communist activities. Nonetheless, the party remained active. The Communist Party of Bukovina organised protests against the 1921 Land Reform and against the Romanianization of the Ukrainian schools in Bukovina.

An important founding member and leader was Wolf Stern, the brother of Soviet GRU general Manfred Stern, who will later become an academic in East Germany.

At the request of the Comintern, the Communist Party of Bukovina was merged into the Communist Party of Romania (PCdR) in 1926, becoming the Bukovina regional branch of the PCdR. Its members reorganized into the legal Vyzvolennia party in 1929.

It was precisely to avoid legal punishments that several KPB members and sympathizers emigrated to the Soviet Union (USSR):

- 1922: Serhiy Kanyuk, a native of the village of Khlivyshche;
- 1925: Semen Hutsulyak from Nyzhni Stanivtsi, a KPB member since 1920, arrived in the Soviet Union (specifically Kharkiv, the then capital of Ukraine) after graduating from the University of Vienna;
- 1926:
  - Volodymyr Havrylyuk from Khreshchatyk;
  - Evdokia Basaraba from Lenkivtsi;
  - Mykhailo Panchyk from Doroshivtsi;
  - Osyp Semenovich Bukshovany from the village of Zhabie in Galicia;
- 1930: Semen Halytskyi from Novaya Zhuchka. He then became a member of the central committee of the Communist Party of Romania, representing the Bukovinan exiles in the USSR.

All of them received high-ranking positions in the Ukrainian SSR until the repressive campaigns against the Ukrainian Military Organization (“UVO”) and the Polish Military Organization (“POV”) began in Ukraine. During 1934–1937, all of the aforementioned members of the Communist Party of Bukovina became victims of Stalinist repressions.

The Comintern operated a party school in Moscow, where foreign communists, including those from Bukovina, were trained, notably Bernhard Katz, Karl Terletsky, and Vasyl Voloshchuk. The NKVD used them as its agents both at in the USSR and abroad.

=== As part of the Communist Party of Romania ===
After the emigration of Semen Halytskyi, the leadership of the Bukovina Regional Committee of the Communist Party of Romania was mainly filled by representatives of local Jewry.

On the 1st of May 1931, the legal front organization Vyzvolennia 10,000-strong May Day demonstration in 1931 in Cernăuți under the slogan: "No war against the Soviet Union!".

During the Spanish Civil War, the Bukovina communists created committees for assistance to the Republican faction in the cities of Bukovina, including Cernăuți. The Bukovina regional branch of the Communist Party of Romania continued to advocate for dictatorship of the proletariat, as well as for the annexation of Bukovina to Soviet Ukraine. It took positions against "Romanian chauvinism, "Ukrainian bourgeois nationalism" and Zionism. At that time, the struggle against Trotskyism was unfolding in the Soviet Communist Party. It also affected the Communist Party of Romania and its Bukovina branch, leading to intra-party strife in Bukovina. The Siguranța took advantage of this, and many communists and their supporters were arrested and imprisoned. Semen Halytskyi was arrested in USSR in 1937, on the charges of being a Siguranța agent, and sentenced to prison, dying in captivity in 1954. S. I. Kanyuk was arrested in 1934 and sentenced to prison in Siberia, where he died in 1945.

In 1940, after the Soviet occupation of Bessarabia and Northern Bukovina (which was endorsed by the PCdR), the Chernivtsi regional branch of the Communist Party of Ukraine was created. Vasyl Georgievich Gotynchan, one of the active figures communist movement in Bukovina, became a victim of false denunciations by Julian Mirosh and Bernhard Katz. Denis Parafteyovich and Ivan Mikhailovich Grekuli from Shipyntsi, zealous party members, were also accused of Trotskyism and could not clear themselves of these "black stains" until the end of their days, though they died natural deaths. Some Jewish communists, notably Mikhel Shor and his sister Beti from Kitsman, were arrested by the NKVD in 1940 as a result of denunciations, and their fate remains unclear to this day.
