= Shubranets =

Commune in Chernivtsi Oblast, Ukraine

Coordinates: 48°24′N 25°53′E

Shubranets (Ukrainian: Шубранець; Romanian: Șubrănești; German: Schubranetz) is a commune (selsoviet) in Chernivtsi Raion, Chernivtsi Oblast, Ukraine. It belongs to Horishni Sherivtsi rural hromada, one of the hromadas of Ukraine.

== History and overview ==
Until 18 July 2020, Shubranets belonged to Zastavna Raion. The raion was abolished in July 2020 as part of the administrative reform of Ukraine, which reduced the number of raions of Chernivtsi Oblast to three. The area of Zastavna Raion was merged into Chernivtsi Raion.
