= Khreshchatyk (disambiguation) =

Khreshchatyk is the main street in Kyiv, Ukraine.

Khreshchatyk may also refer to:

- Khreshchatyk (Kyiv Metro), a Kyiv Metro station
- Khreshchatyk, Chernivtsi Oblast, a village in Ukraine
