= Onut =

Onut may refer to:

- Güven Önüt, Turkish footballer
- Bogdan Onuț, Romanian footballer
- Onut, village in Chernivtsi Oblast, Ukraine
