= Cuciurul =

Cuciurul is the Romanian name for two villages in Chernivtsi Oblast, Ukraine:

- Cuciurul Mare, or Velykyi Kuchuriv Commune
- Cuciurul Mic, or Mali Kuchuriv Commune
