= Heorhiy Mazurashu =

Ukrainian sports journalist and politician

- Георгій Мазурашу
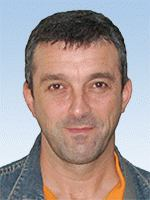
- Official portrait, 2019

People's Deputy of Ukraine
- Incumbent
- Assumed office 29 August 2019
- Preceded by: Hryhoriy Timish
- Constituency: Chernivtsi Oblast, No. 203

Personal details
- Born: 17 April 1971 (age 55) Krupianske, Ukrainian SSR, Soviet Union (now Ukraine)
- Party: Servant of the People
- Other political affiliations: Self Reliance
- Education: Chernivtsi University

Heorhiy Heorhiyovych Mazurashu (Ukrainian: Георгій Георгійович Мазурашу, Romanian: Gheorghe Mazurașu; born 17 April 1971) is a Ukrainian sports journalist and politician currently serving as a People's Deputy of Ukraine from Ukraine's 203rd electoral district as a member of Servant of the People.

== Early life and career ==
Heorhiy Heorhiyovych Mazurashu was born on 17 April 1971 in the village of Krupianske (Romanian: Pasat), in Ukraine's western Chernivtsi Oblast. In 1990, he graduated from the Chernivtsi Mechanical and Technological College. He is an ethnic Romanian.

In 1995, he graduated from the faculty of history of Chernivtsi University. In 2009, he received a master's degree from the same university, majoring in "Civil Service".

== Sports career ==
In 1985, he began to engage in athletics. In the 8th grade, he won the regional competition among schoolchildren at a distance of 400 m with a result of 52.9 seconds.

In 1987, he took 1st place in the 800 m at the Spartakiad of Ukraine among technical schools of light industry and won the 800 m at the youth championship of Ukraine with the prizes of Honored Master of Sports Yevhen Arzhanov. In 1988, he won the 800 m + 1,500 m medley at the youth indoor championship of Ukraine. Played as part of the youth national team of Ukraine at the 1988 USSR Youth Indoor Championship in Chisinau.

In 1992, he won the youth championship of Ukraine in indoor athletics, the bronze medalist of the 1st Ukrainian indoor championship.

Winner of the championship of the republican council of the FST "Kolos" among young men, juniors, adults, junior and youth championships of Ukraine, silver and bronze medalist of the Championship of Ukraine among universities (1500 m, 800 m, Kryvyi Rih). Candidate for master of sports.

== Journalistic activity ==
Until 2005, he worked as an editor of the sports department of the newspaper "Molodyi Bukovynets". In parallel, he collaborated with the publications "Sportyvna gazeta", "Ukrainian football", "Day" and local TV channels.

Until 2005, he published the sports and entertainment publication "Super!".

Member of the Union of Journalists of Ukraine. In 2004, he became a laureate of the competition among journalists "Olympic Ukraine", in 2009 he won the photo contest of the National Olympic Committee of Ukraine.

Until September 2008, he worked as the head of the department for physical culture and sports of the Chernivtsi regional state administration.

In 2009, he initiated the holding of the first Miss Sport Ukraine beauty contest among sportswomen in Ukraine.

Until 2018, he was a member of the executive committee of the Chernivtsi regional branch of the National Olympic Committee of Ukraine.

In 2011, he became the director of the Chernivtsi Regional Center for Physical Health of the Population "Sports for All".

== Political career ==
In 2015, he was a candidate for deputy of the Chernivtsi Oblast Council from the Samopomich party.

In 2019, he was elected a People's Deputy of Ukraine of the 9th convocation from the Servant of the People party in Ukraine's 203rd electoral district.

He is a member of the Committee on Youth and Sports, Chairman of the Subcommittee on Physical Culture and Mass Sports in the Verkhovna Rada,

In July 2020, he registered in the Verkhovna Rada a draft law "on amendments to the Code of Ukraine on administrative offenses regarding responsibility for propaganda of homosexuality and transgenderism".

In December 2020, he voted against the appointment of Serhiy Skarlet to the position of head of the Ministry of Education and Culture.

In December 2020 as well, he supported the pro-Russian People's Deputy Maksym Buzhanskyi, who proposed to cancel fines for the refusal of employees in the service sector to serve a client in Ukrainian languages in Ukraine.

On 9 October 2026, Mazurashu presented draft law No. 16119-1 on the educational rights of national minorities to the Verkhovna Rada. This happened following objections raised by representatives of organizations of the Romanian minority in Ukraine regarding several provisions of draft law No. 16119, introduced on 1 October with the same scope. According to these representatives, the objections of the Romanian community were ignored during the drafting of the original bill, with no real consultations with it having taken place. On 12 October, the Verkhovna Rada's Committee on Education, Science and Innovation unanimously recommended the rejection of the bill after its examination, with the committee's president, Serhiy Babak, stating it would limit the use of the official Ukrainian language in schools. The original No. 16119 bill was passed and promulgated on the same day.

== Controversies ==
In May 2022, he became a co-author of the scandalous draft law No. 7351, which was supposed to give the command the right to kill military personnel for disobeying orders without any proven circumstances. This bill was evaluated in the media as an attempt to restore the death penalty in Ukraine.
