= Eliyahu Tamler =

Romanian Zionist and senior Irgun commander (1919–1948)

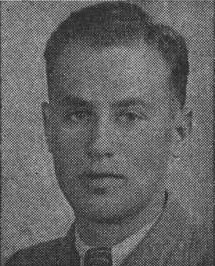
- Native name: אליהו טמלר
- Nicknames: Yehoshua, Edi
- Born: August 25, 1919; Zastavna, Kingdom of Romania (present-day Ukraine)
- Died: April 29, 1948 (aged 28) Jaffa, Mandatory Palestine
- Allegiance: Irgun (1940-1948)
- Conflicts: Jewish insurgency in Mandatory Palestine; 1947–1948 civil war in Mandatory Palestine: Operation Hametz †

Eliyahu Tamler (sometimes rendered as Temler, Hebrew: אליהו טמלר; August 25, 1919 – April 29, 1948) was Romanian Zionist and senior commander in the Irgun underground paramilitary group (also known as Etzel), who fought in the 1947–1948 civil war in Mandatory Palestine.

== Biography ==
Eliyahu Tamler was born in 1919 in Zastavna, Kingdom of Romania (in present-day Ukraine), as Eduard Samuel Tamler, to Abraham and Sabina Tamler. His father died when he was 13 years old. He studied at a school in his hometown and at a gymnasium in the neighboring city of Cernăuți. His father was a Zionist activist. Eliyahu enrolled at the University of Cernăuți, but didn't graduate.

In 1939, he immigrated to Eretz Israel, then Mandate Palestine, as an immigrant on the ship Parita, which sailed from the port of Constanța on July 12, carrying 857 Beitar activists, and after 42 days it arrived at the coast of Tel Aviv. Upon his arrival, Tamler joined the Beitar groups operating in Mandate Palestine. He later became part of the Irgun underground and was active in its ranks. In 1942, Tamler was arrested by the British Mandate authorities in Haifa and sent to a detention camp near Mizra, from where he was released in March 1943. After his release, he was appointed commander of the Irgun's operational activity in the Petah Tikva District and later in Tel Aviv District. As part of this role, he planned and carried out a large number of actions against the British authorities, such as the capture of a truck carrying explosives en route to the Migdal Tzedek quarries, the blowing up of communication pillars in the Petach Tikva area (1945), the capture of weapons from the British Army's warehouses in Sarafand, the attack on the immigration and customs offices in Haifa (February 12, 1944), the blowing up of oil pipelines (May 1945), the capture of explosives from the Solel Boneh Company warehouses (August 1945), the attack on the Haifa police building (September 29, 1945) and the attack on the Lydda railway station during the Night of the Trains (1 November 1945).

On 2 April 1946, he was caught by the British carrying a weapon, sentenced to seven years in prison and detained in the Jerusalem Central Prison. He was the leader of the Irgun within the prison, but lacked the authority to authorise particularly controversial plans such as martyrdom operations. On 20 February 1948, together with 11 other Irgun and Lehi prisoners, he managed to dig a tunnel and escape from prison. After his escape, he was appointed to a central role in the Irgun's national headquarters.

On 29 April 1948, Tamler was one of the Etzel commanders in the Battle of Jaffa. During this operation, he was hit by a British bombshell and killed. Menachem Begin, who knew him closely, praised him, saying that "Eliyahu is gone - there was nobody better in the organization than him". He was buried in the Nahalat Yitzhak Cemetery.
