= Onut, Ukraine =

Commune in Chernivtsi Oblast, Ukraine

Coordinates: 48°34′N 26°03′E

Onut (Ukrainian: Онут; Romanian: Onut) is a commune (selsoviet) in Chernivtsi Raion, Chernivtsi Oblast, Ukraine. It belongs to Vikno rural hromada, one of the hromadas of Ukraine.

The village lies southwest of the Dniester. The Onut River runs through the village; one side is in the historic region of Bukovina, the other in Bessarabia.

Until 18 July 2020, Onut belonged to Zastavna Raion. The raion was abolished in July 2020 as part of the administrative reform of Ukraine, which reduced the number of raions of Chernivtsi Oblast to three. The area of Zastavna Raion was merged into Chernivtsi Raion.
