= Zastavna urban hromada =

Urban hromada in Chernivtsi Oblast, Ukraine

Zastavna urban hromada Заставнівська міська громада
- Hromada
- Interactive map of Zastavna urban hromada
- Country: Ukraine
- Oblast: Chernivtsi
- Raion: Chernivtsi

Area
  - Total: 46.83 km^{2} (18.08 sq mi)

Population (2018)
  - Total: 8,382
  - Density: 179.0/km^{2} (463.6/sq mi)
- Settlements: 3
- Cities: 1
- Villages: 2

Zastavna urban territorial hromada (Ukrainian: Заставнівська міська територіальна громада, romanized: Zastavnivska miska terytorialna hromada) is a hromada of Ukraine, located in the western Chernivtsi Oblast. Its administrative centre is the city of Zastavna.

== Settlements ==
In addition to one city (Zastavna), there are two villages within the hromada:

- Malyi Kuchuriv
- Verbivtsi
