= Stavchany, Chernivtsi Raion, Chernivtsi Oblast =

Village in Chernivtsi Oblast, Ukraine

Stavchany Ставчани
- Village
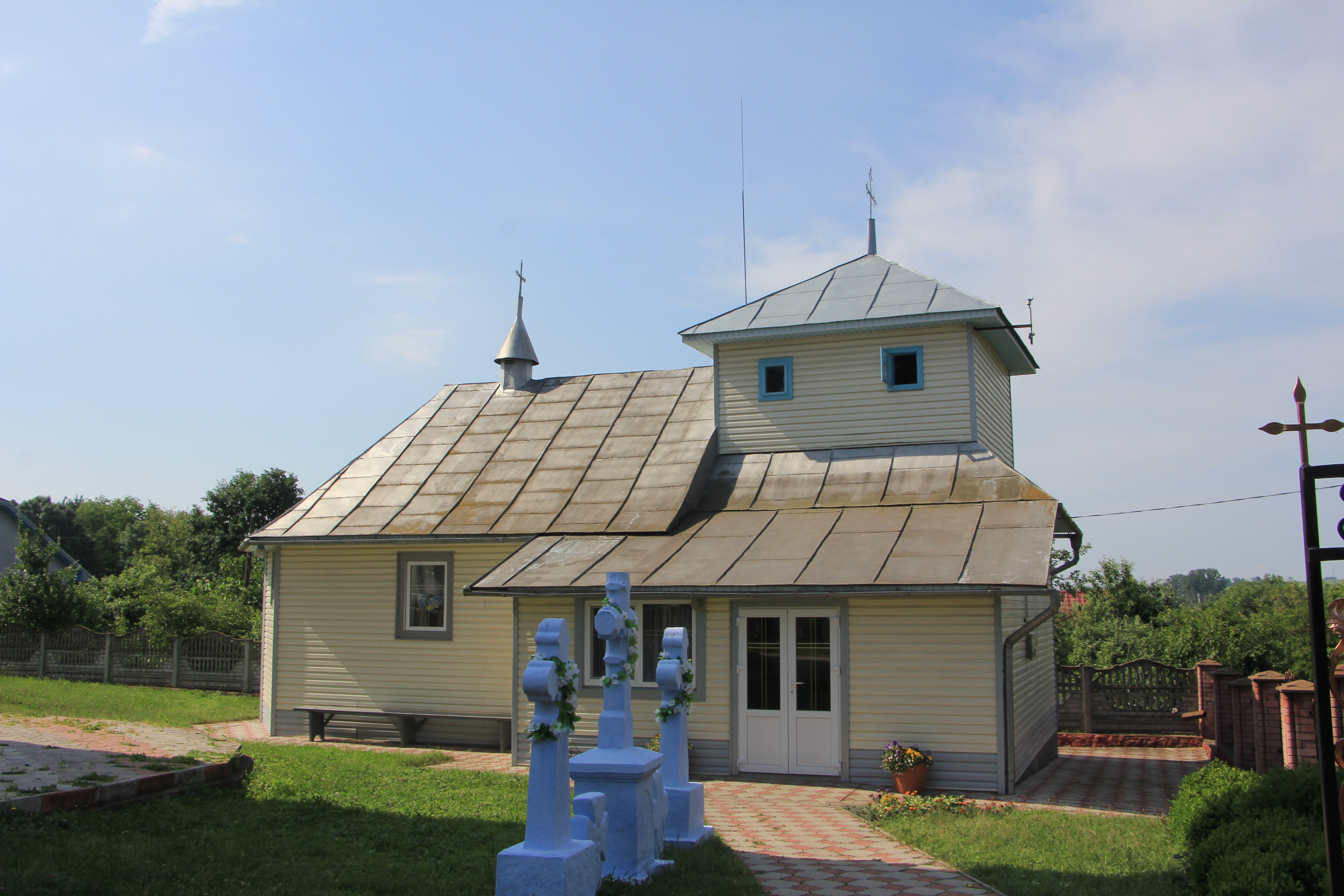
- Wooden church of Michael the Archangel

- Location within Chernivtsi Oblast Location within Ukraine
- Coordinates: 48°30′36″N 25°40′56″E
- Country: Ukraine
- Oblast: Chernivtsi Oblast
- District: Chernivtsi Raion
- Hromada: Stavchany rural hromada
- Elevation: 235 m (771 ft)

Population (2001)
  - Total: 2,168
- Time zone: UTC+2 (EET)
  - Summer (DST): UTC+3 (EEST)
- Postal code: 59316
- Area code: +380 3736

Stavchany (Ukrainian: Ставчани; Romanian: Stăuceni; German: Stawczan) is a village in Chernivtsi Raion, Chernivtsi Oblast, Ukraine. It hosts the administration of Stavchany rural hromada, one of the hromadas of Ukraine.

Until 18 July 2020, Stavchany belonged to Kitsman Raion. The raion was abolished in July 2020 as part of the administrative reform of Ukraine, which reduced the number of raions of Chernivtsi Oblast to three. The area of Kitsman Raion was split between Chernivtsi Raion and Vyzhnytsia Raion, with Stavchany being transferred to Chernivtsi Raion.
