= Kitsman Raion =

Former subdivision of Chernivtsi Oblast, Ukraine

Kitsman Raion Кіцманський район
- Raion
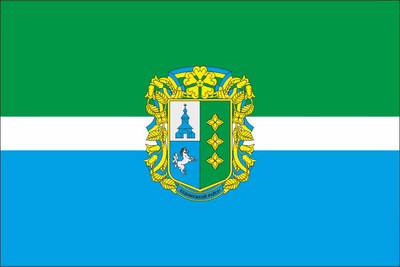
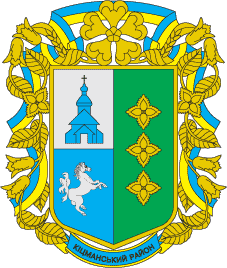
- Flag Coat of arms

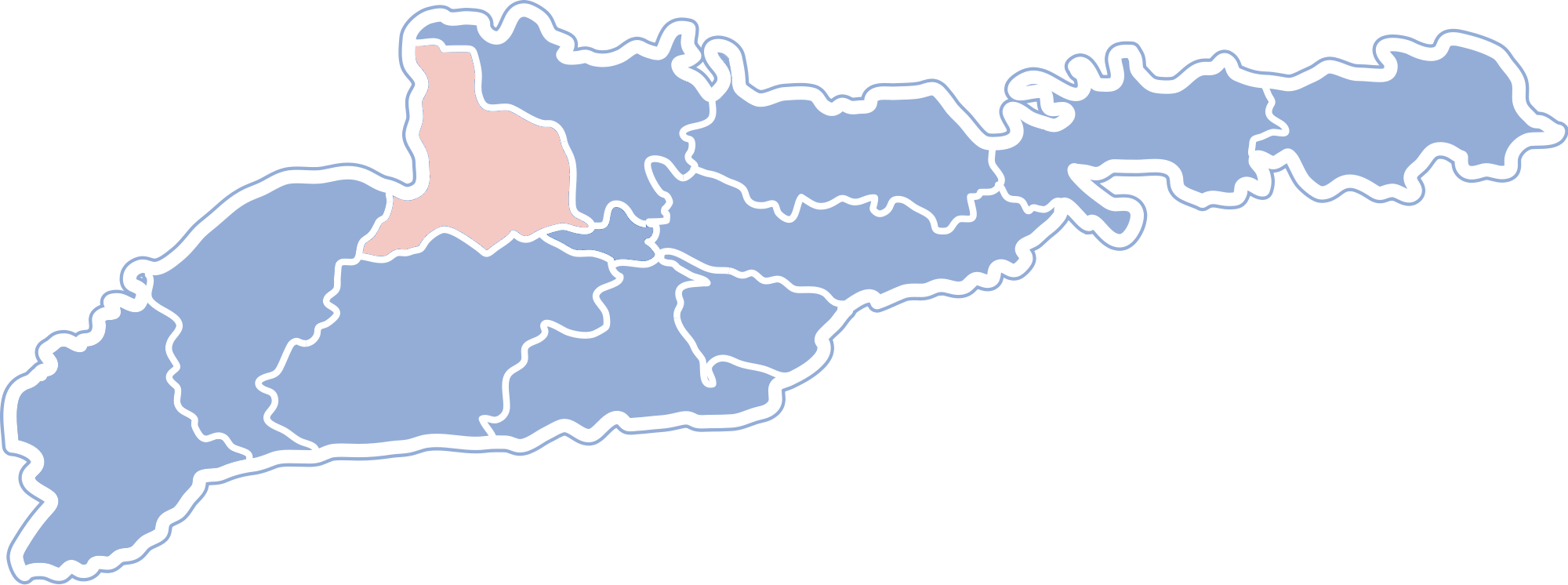
- Coordinates: 48°26′N 25°43′E
- Country: Ukraine
- Region: Chernivtsi Oblast
- Established: 1940
- Disestablished: 18 July 2020
- Admin. center: Kitsman
- Subdivisions: List: — city councils; — settlement councils; — rural councils; Number of localities: — cities; — urban-type settlements; 43 — villages; — rural settlements

Area
  - Total: 610 km^{2} (240 sq mi)

Population (2020)
  - Total: 68,027
  - Density: 110/km^{2} (290/sq mi)
- Time zone: UTC+02:00 (EET)
  - Summer (DST): UTC+03:00 (EEST)
- Postal index: 593xx
- Area code: 380 3736

Kitsman Raion (Ukrainian: Кіцманський район, romanized: Kitsmans'kyi rayon) was an administrative raion (district) in the northern part of Chernivtsi Oblast, in the historical region of Bukovina, in western Ukraine. The administrative center was the city of Kitsman. The raion had an area of 610 square kilometres (240 mi^{2}). The raion was abolished on 18 July 2020 as part of the administrative reform of Ukraine, which reduced the number of raions of Chernivtsi Oblast to three. The area of Kitsman Raion was split between Chernivtsi Raion and Vyzhnytsia Raion. The last estimate of the raion population was 68,027 (2020 est.)

At the time of disestablishment, the raion consisted of five hromadas:

- Brusnytsia rural hromada with the administration in the selo of Brusnytsia, transferred to Vyzhnytsia Raion;
- Kitsman urban hromada with the administration in Kitsman, transferred to Chernivtsi Raion;
- Mamaivtsi rural hromada with the administration in the selo of Mamaivtsi, transferred to Chernivtsi Raion;
- Nepolokivtsi settlement hromada with the administration in the urban-type settlement of Nepolokivtsi, transferred to Chernivtsi Raion;
- Stavchany urban hromada with the administration in the selo of Stavchany, transferred to Chernivtsi Raion.

== See also ==
- Subdivisions of Ukraine
