= Kostryzhivka =

Rural locality in Chernivtsi Oblast, Ukraine

Kostryzhivka Кострижівка
- Rural settlement
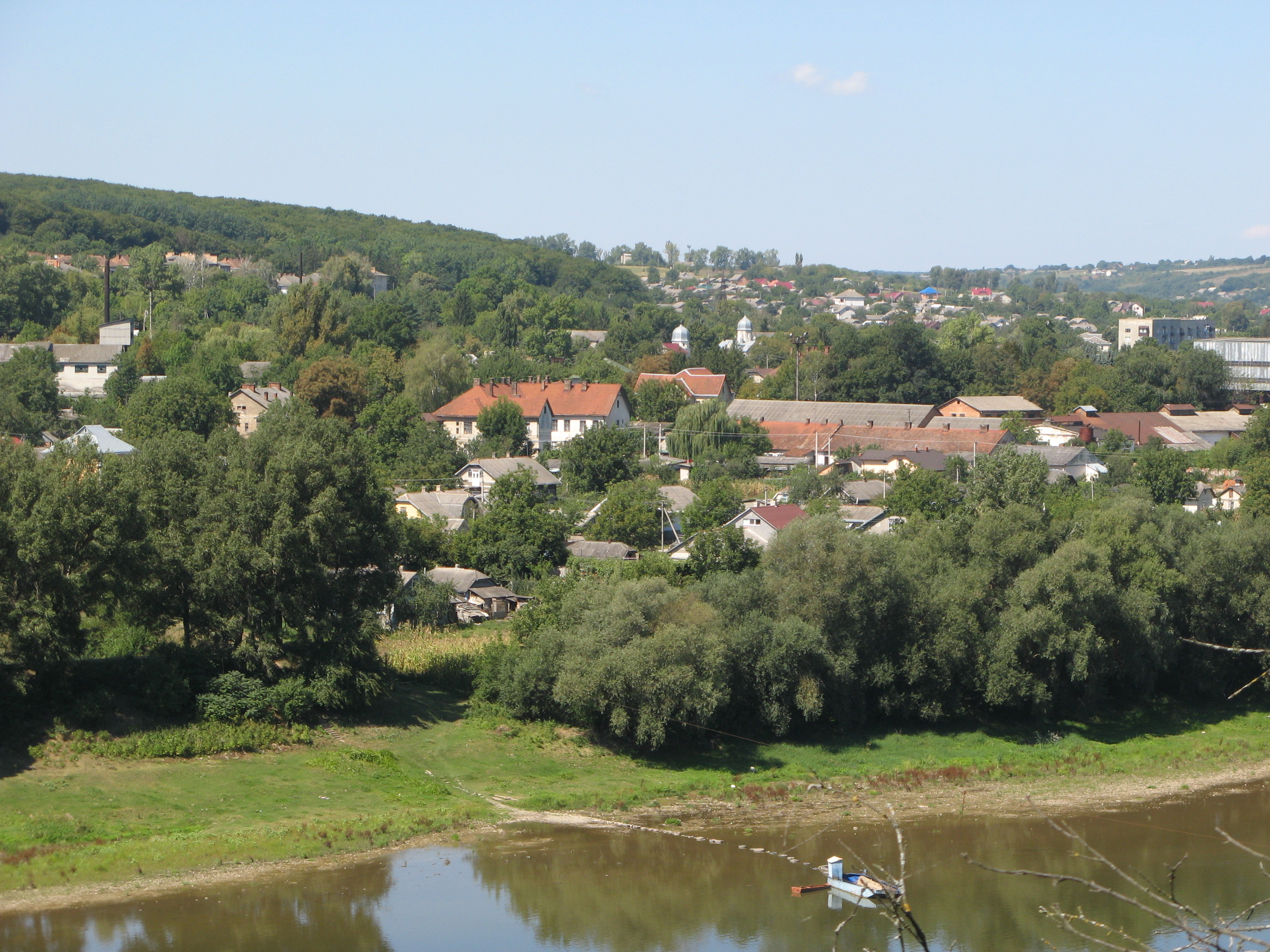
- View towards Kostryzhivka

- Location of Kostryzhivka in Ukraine Kostryzhivka (Ukraine)
- Coordinates: 48°39′10″N 25°42′24″E
- Country: Ukraine
- Oblast: Chernivtsi Oblast
- Raion: Chernivtsi Raion
- Town status: 1959

Government
  - Town Head: Volodymyr Starko
- Elevation: 164 m (538 ft)

Population (2022)
  - Total: 2,587
- Time zone: UTC+2 (EET)
  - Summer (DST): UTC+3 (EEST)
- Postal code: 59410
- Area code: +380 3737

Kostryzhivka (Ukrainian: Кострижівка; Romanian: Costrijeni or Costrijiuca; German: Kostriziuka or Kostriziuka bei Zwinacze; Polish: Kostryżiwka)) is a rural settlement in Chernivtsi Raion, Chernivtsi Oblast, western Ukraine. It hosts the administration of Kostryzhivka settlement hromada, one of the hromadas of Ukraine. At the 2001 census, population was 2,885. Current population: 2,587 (2022 estimate).

Kostryzhivka is located on the right-bank of the Dniester River, across from the neighboring city of Zalishchyky in Ternopil Oblast.

== History ==
In 1959, Kostryzhivka received urban-type settlement status after the village Luka was merged into it.

Until 18 July 2020, Kostryzhivka belonged to Zastavna Raion. The raion was abolished in July 2020 as part of the administrative reform of Ukraine, which reduced the number of raions of Chernivtsi Oblast to three. The area of Zastavna Raion was merged into Chernivtsi Raion.

On 26 January 2024, a new law entered into force which abolished the status of urban-type settlement, and Kostryzhivka became a rural settlement.
