= Turiatka =

Village in Chernivtsi Oblast, Ukraine

Coordinates: 48°03′N 26°09′E

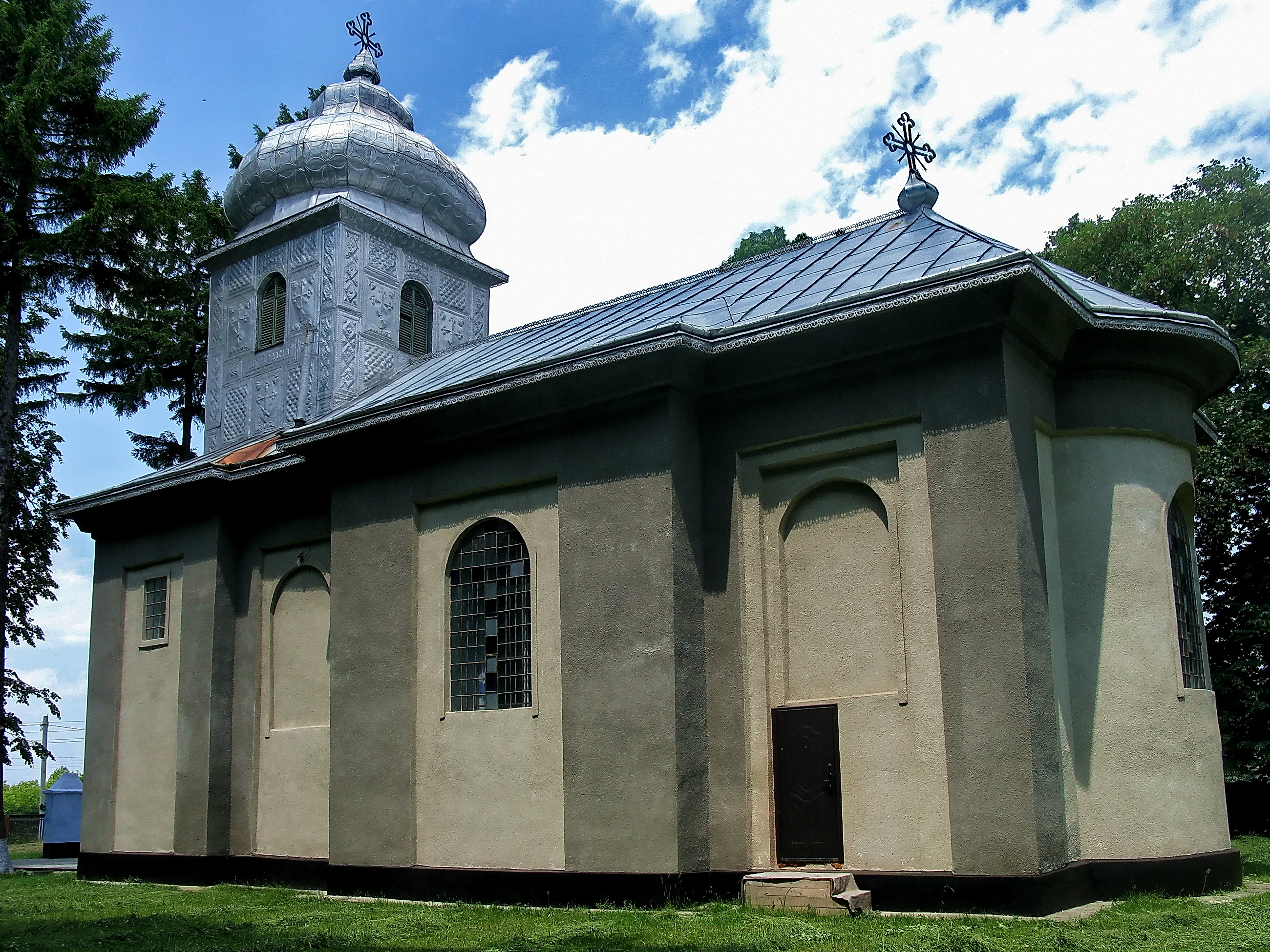

Turiatka (Ukrainian: Турятка; Romanian: Tureatca) is a village in Hlyboka Raion, Chernivtsi Raion, Ukraine. It belongs to Tarashany rural hromada, one of the hromadas of Ukraine. It was historically part of the Hertsa region.

Until 18 July 2020, Turiatka belonged to Hlyboka Raion. The raion was abolished in July 2020 as part of the administrative reform of Ukraine, which reduced the number of raions of Chernivtsi Oblast to three. The area of Hlyboka Raion was merged into Chernivtsi Raion. In 2001, 97.33% of the inhabitants spoke Ukrainian as their native language, and 2.25% spoke Romanian.
