= Doroshivtsi =

Commune in Chernivtsi Oblast, Ukraine

Doroshivtsi Дорошівці Doroșăuți; Doroschoutz
- Village
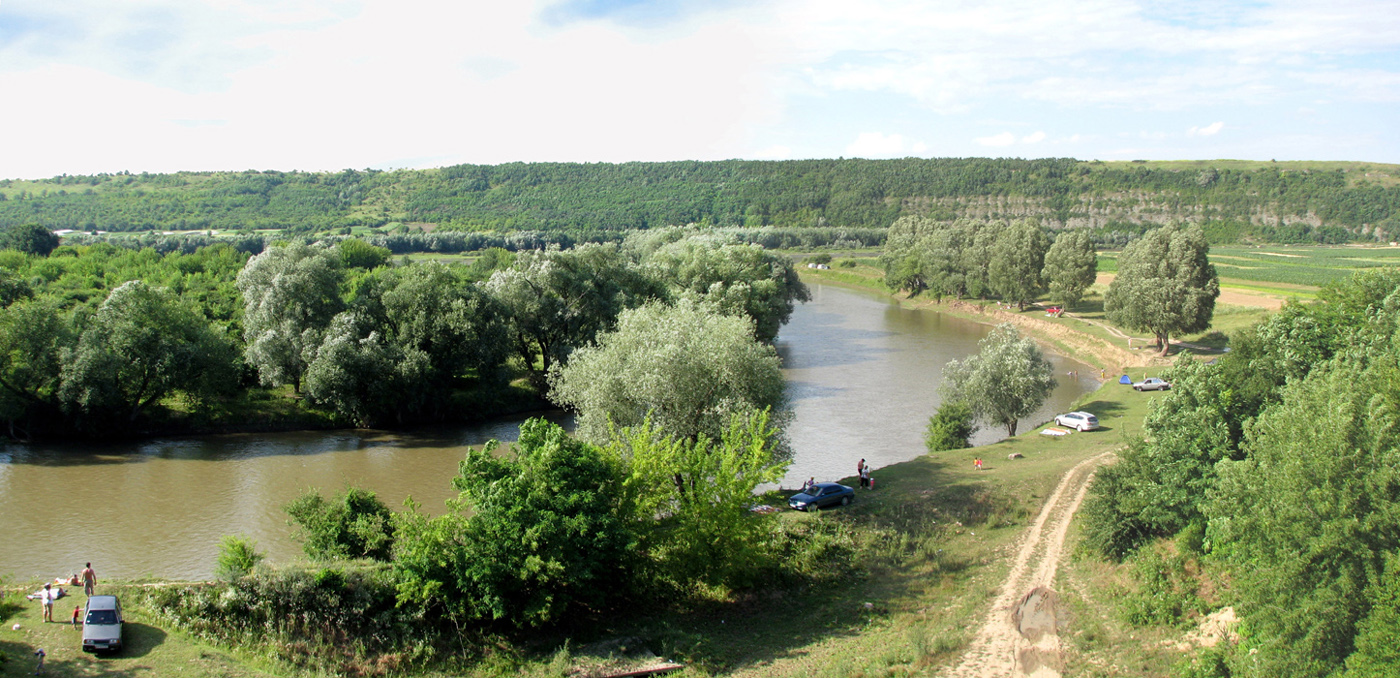
- Doroshivetsky Island on the Dniester near the village
- Interactive map of Doroshivtsi
- Location in Chernivtsi Oblast Location in Ukraine
- Country: Ukraine
- Oblast: Chernivtsi Oblast
- Raion: Chernivtsi Raion
- Hromada: Vikno rural hromada
- Elevation: 150 m (490 ft)

Population
  - Total: 1,534
- Time zone: UTC+2 (EET)
  - Summer (DST): UTC+3 (EEST)
- Postal code: 59423
- Area code: +380 3737
- KOATUU: 7321584401
- KATOTTH: UA73060090030050438

Doroshivtsi (Ukrainian: Дорошівці; Romanian: Doroșăuți; German: Doroschoutz) is a commune (selsoviet) in Chernivtsi Raion, Chernivtsi Oblast, Ukraine. It belongs to Vikno rural hromada, one of the hromadas of Ukraine.

Until 18 July 2020, Doroshivtsi belonged to Zastavna Raion. The raion was abolished in July 2020 as part of the administrative reform of Ukraine, which reduced the number of raions ofn Chernivtsi Oblast to three. The area of Zastavna Raion was merged into Chernivtsi Raion.
