= Nepolokivtsi =

Rural locality in Chernivtsi Oblast, Ukraine

Nepolokivtsi Неполоківці Nepolocăuți
- Rural settlement
- Interactive map of Nepolokivtsi
- Location of Nepolokivtsi in Ukraine Nepolokivtsi (Ukraine)
- Coordinates: 48°23′31″N 25°38′49″E
- Country: Ukraine
- Oblast: Chernivtsi Oblast
- Raion: Chernivtsi Raion
- Urban status since: 1968

Government
  - Town Head: Andriy Panchuk
- Elevation: 194 m (636 ft)

Population (2022)
  - Total: 2,427
- Time zone: UTC+2 (EET)
  - Summer (DST): UTC+3 (EEST)
- Postal code: 59330
- Area code: +380 3736
- Website: http://rada.gov.ua/

Nepolokivtsi (Ukrainian: Неполоківці; Romanian: Nepolocăuți; German: Nepolokoutz) is a rural settlement in Chernivtsi Raion, Chernivtsi Oblast, western Ukraine. It hosts the administration of Nepolokivtsi settlement hromada, one of the hromadas of Ukraine. Current population: 2,427 (2022 estimate).

== History ==
Nepolokivtsi was first documented in 1425 as part of Moldavia.

The town was annexed in 1775 by the Habsburg monarchy (which became the Austrian Empire in 1804, and Austria-Hungary in 1867). In 1880 there were around 1,210 people in the town.

In 1910, the ethnic makeup of Nepolokivtsi was almost 75% Ukrainian (Ruthenian). Jews made up approximately 15% of the town while the remainder was made up of Poles.

During World War I, residents of the town were enlisted into the Austro-Hungarian Army. In 1918, at the end of World War I, the region was shortly part of the West Ukrainian People's Republic before being annexed into the Kingdom of Romania. After World War II, the town was then made part of the Ukrainian Soviet Socialist Republic.

Nepolokivtsi received urban-type settlement status in 1968. In 1969 the population was 2,287 people. In 1989 the population was 2,764 people, and in 2013 the population was 2,493 people.

Until 18 July 2020, Nepolokivtsi belonged to Kitsman Raion. The raion was abolished in July 2020 as part of the administrative reform of Ukraine, which reduced the number of raions of Chernivtsi Oblast to three. The area of Kitsman Raion was split between Chernivtsi Raion and Vyzhnytsia Raion, with Nepolokivtsi being transferred to Chernivtsi Raion.

On 26 January 2024, a new law entered into force which abolished the status of urban-type settlement in Ukraine, and Nepolokivtsi became a rural settlement.
