= Chernivtsi Town Hall =

Building in Chernivtsi, Ukraine

- Чернівецька ратуша
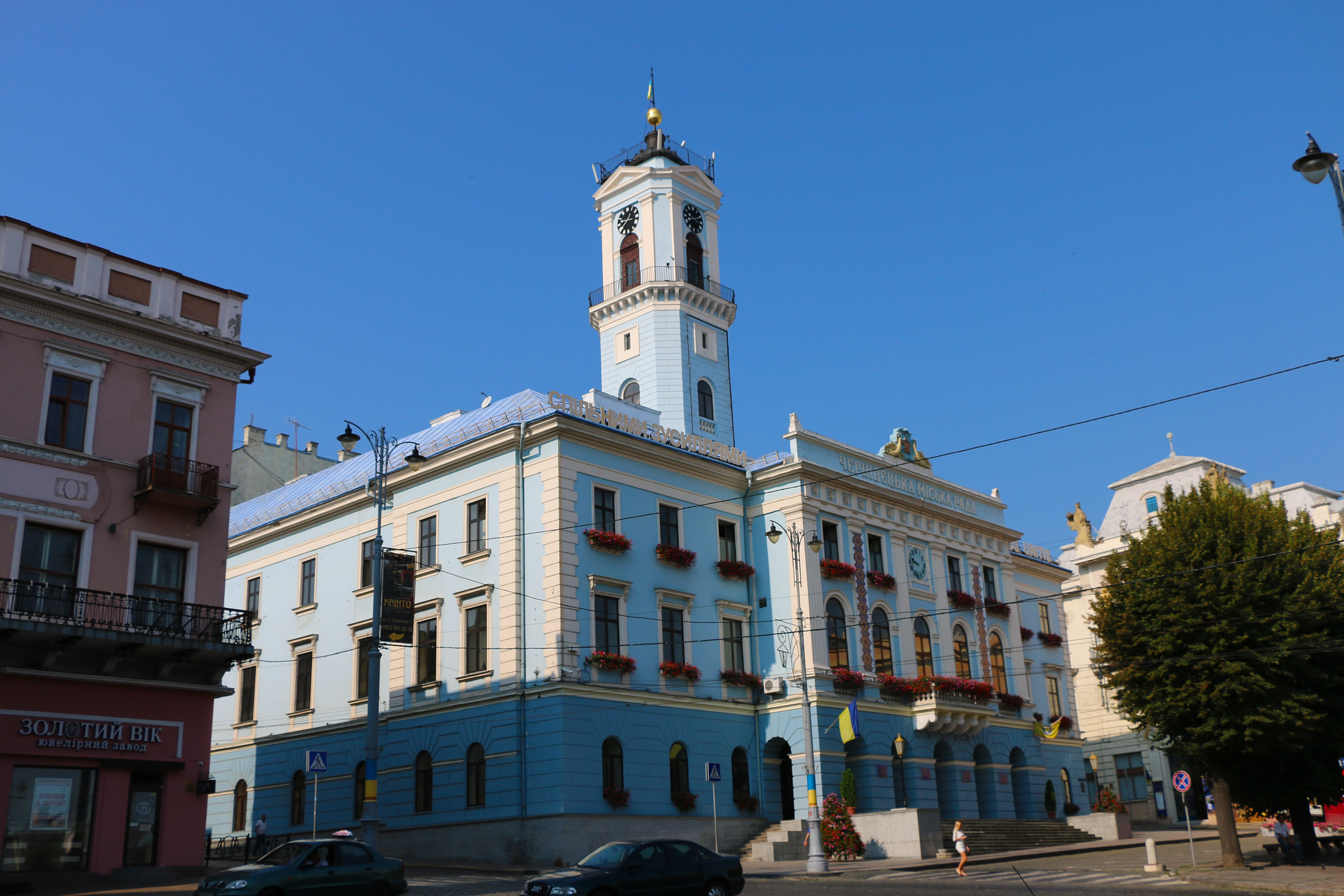

General information
- Type: Town hall
- Architectural style: Neoclassicism
- Location: 1 Tsentralna Square, Chernivtsi, Ukraine
- Coordinates: 48.2916°N 25.9347°E
- Current tenants: Chernivtsi City Council
- Year built: 1843 – 1847

Design and construction
- Architects: Adolf Marina, Andreas Mikulicz von Radecki

Immovable Monument of National Significance of Ukraine
- Official name: Ратуша (Town hall)
- Type: Architecture
- Reference no.: 240137

Chernivtsi Town Hall (Ukrainian: Чернівецька ратуша) is a neoclassical historic town hall (ratusha), located at Tsentralna Square in Chernivtsi, Ukraine. Constructed from 1843 to 1847 by a Polish-Austrian architect Andreas Mikulicz von Radecki, the building is an architectural monument of national significance. It currently serves as the seat of Chernivtsi City Council and houses the office of the mayor of the city.

== History ==
The idea of building a town hall in Chernivtsi arose in the 1820s. The administrative building was planned to be built on the northern edge of the city, above the river Prut. This was opposed by the Bukovina District engineer Adolf Marina, who stated that the city will develop in the opposite, southern direction.

On 2 September 1832, the city administration was reorganized into the magistrate, which intensified the need for construction of the town hall. The opportunity to begin construction appeared only in 1841, when the magistrate, bought the necessary plot of land for 8 thousand florins.

The ceremonial laying of the "cornerstone" took place on 19 April 1843. The consecration was performed by the Orthodox bishop Eugene Hackmann with the participation of clergy of other denominations. Construction, under the direction of Adolf Marin and the supervision of architect Andreas Mikulicz, lasted less than four years. Amendments were made to the project during the construction, in particular, a third floor was added. In July 1847, the Mendel Amster Construction Company notified the local authorities that the town hall was ready to be opened.

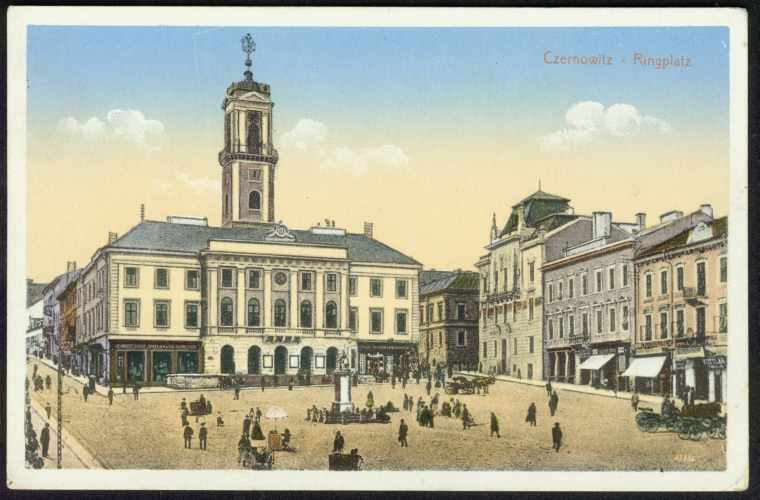
The town hall on an Austrian postcard c. 1905

On 20 March 1848, an official acceptance of the building by the "public building committee" was planned. The event was supposed to end with a banquet, which did not take place due to the news of the revolutionary events in Vienna.

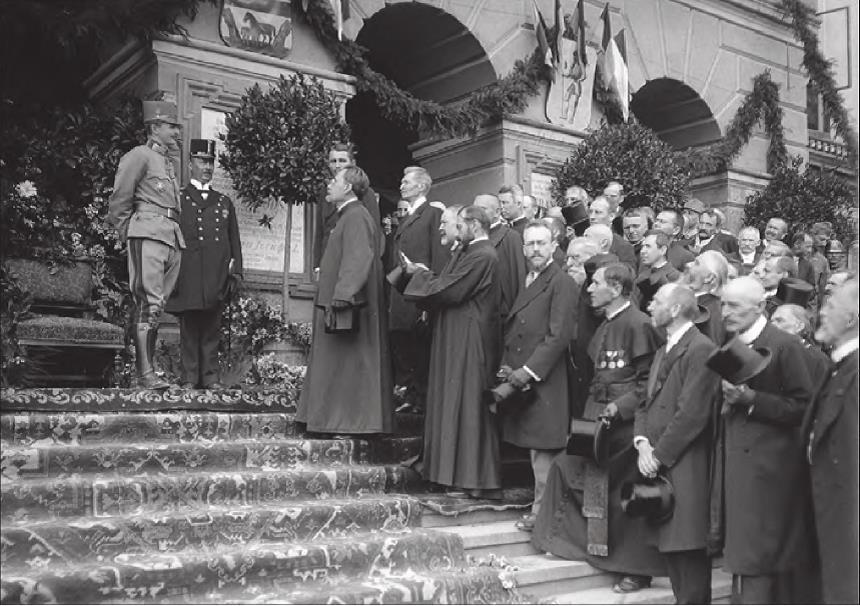
Charles I of Austria on the steps of the town hall.

Originally, the first floor of the building was occupied by the city registry office, the land cadastre department, the police auditor, the military detention room and its kitchen. The second floor was occupied by a meeting hall, several civil servants offices, a room for interrogations and a detention room for nobility. On the third floor were the apartments of the city attorney and assessor, as well as the apartments of the burgomaster, which consisted of six rooms and a kitchen. Later, the members of the public, seeking to make the maintenance of city officials cheaper, forced the magistrate to lease the premises of the first floor to private individuals for commercial purposes.

On 6 August 1917, Chernivtsi Town Hall was visited by the Emperor Charles I of Austria.

In the 1930s, all commercial structures were evicted from the premises of the Chernivtsi town hall, and the building was used exclusively as an administrative office of the local authority.

Starting 12 November 2004, every day at 12 o'clock a trumpet player in ethnic Bukovyna clothing plays the melody of the song "Marichka", called the unofficial anthem of Chernivtsi, from the tower of the building.

== Architecture ==
Chernivtsi town hall is a three-story building with a tall tower and a courtyard, built in the style of late classicism, which was characteristic of almost all town halls of the time in the Kingdom of Galicia and Lodomeria. The facade of the building is accentuated by a central risalite, topped with a frieze and a rectangular pediment. It is completed by a Doric portico with six pilasters. A relief shield for the city coat of arms is installed on the pediment.

The image of the town hall is completed by a 50-meter two-story tower, which is crowned by a spire with a copper ball and a small flagpole. The mechanical clock, which is installed on the tower of the town hall, was made in Prague. A similar clock is installed in the Kyiv Pechersk Lavra. On 18 February 2024, due to the failure of one of the parts in the pendulum, the clock at the town hall stopped and was closed for renovation.
