= Velyka Buda =

Commune in Chernivtsi Oblast, Ukraine

Coordinates: 48.1478°N 26.0947°E

Velyka Buda (Ukrainian: Велика Буда; Romanian: Buda Mare) is a village in Chernivtsi Raion, Chernivtsi Oblast, Ukraine. It belongs to Ostrytsia rural hromada, one of the hromadas of Ukraine,

This village is mostly populated by Romanian speaking people.

Until 18 July 2020, Velyka Buda belonged to Hertsa Raion. The raion was abolished in July 2020 as part of the administrative reform of Ukraine, which reduced the number of raions of Chernivtsi Oblast to three. The area of Hertsa Raion was merged into Chernivtsi Raion. In 2001, 98.68% of the inhabitants spoke Romanian as their native language. In the 1989 Soviet census, the number of residents who declared themselves Romanians plus Moldovans was 1,034 (1,019+15), representing 97.92% of the locality's population.

== See also ==
- Hertsa region
- Dorohoi County
- Hertsa raion
- Romanians in Ukraine
