= Vikno, Chernivtsi Oblast =

Commune in Chernivtsi Oblast, Ukraine

Newly married Ukrainians from the village Vikno

Vikno (Ukrainian: Вікно; Romanian: Ocna; German: Okna) is a village in Chernivtsi Raion, Chernivtsi Oblast, Ukraine. It hosts the administration of Vikno rural hromada, one of the hromadas of Ukraine.

Until 18 July 2020, Vikno belonged to Zastavna Raion. The raion was abolished in July 2020 as part of the administrative reform of Ukraine, which reduced the number of raions of Chernivtsi Oblast to three. The area of Zastavna Raion was merged into Chernivtsi Raion.
