= Zastavna =

City in Chernivtsi Oblast, Ukraine

Zastavna Заставна
- City
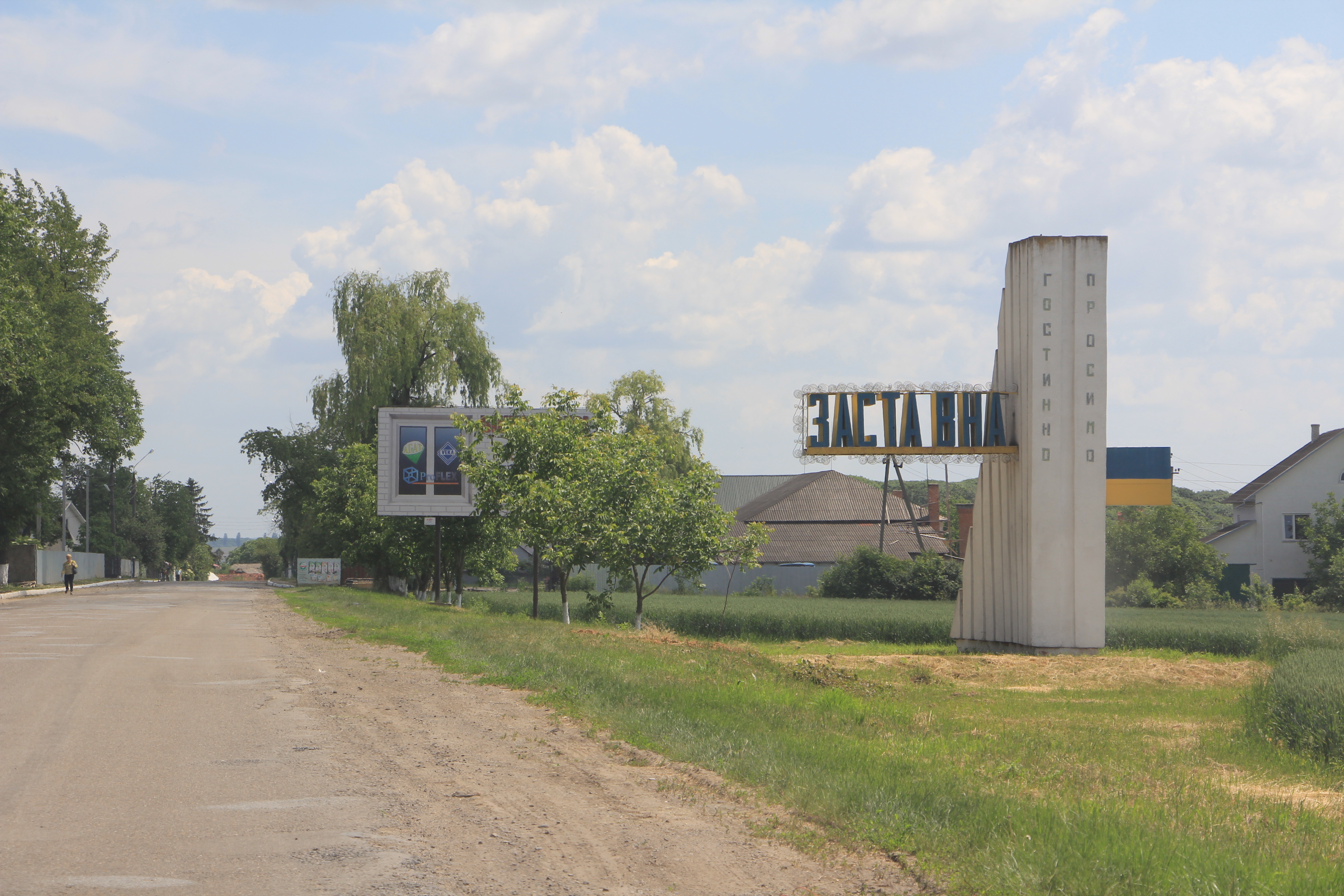
- Sign at the entrance of the city

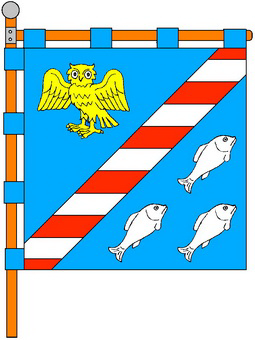
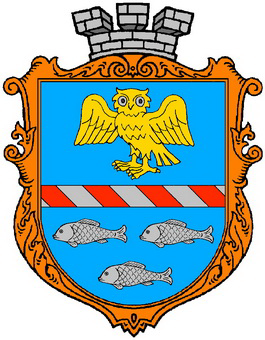
- Flag Coat of arms

- Location within Chernivtsi Oblast Location within Ukraine
- Coordinates: 48°31′13″N 25°50′42″E
- Country: Ukraine
- Oblast: Chernivtsi Oblast
- Raion: Chernivtsi Raion
- Hromada: Zastavna urban hromada
- First chronicled: 1589

Government
  - Mayor: Yaroslav Tsurkan

Population (2022)
  - Total: 7,750
- Time zone: UTC+2 (EET)
  - Summer (DST): UTC+3 (EEST)
- Postal code: 59400-05
- Area code: +380 3737

Zastavna (Ukrainian: Заставна, IPA: [zɐsˈtɑu̯nɐ]; Romanian: Zastavna, German: Zastavna) is a small city in Chernivtsi Raion, Chernivtsi Oblast of Ukraine. Zastavna is located 26 kilometres (16 mi) to the north of the city of Chernivtsi, in the historical region of Bukovina. It hosts the administration of Zastavna urban hromada, one of the hromadas of Ukraine. Population: 7,750 (2022 estimate).

== Etymology ==
The name of Zastavna most likely origins from its location surrounded by ponds (ukr. "stav"). There is also a theory that the name comes from the turnpike (застава, zastava) which once stood on the road to Chernivtsi .

Between 1941 and 1944, while part of Romania, it was known in Romanian as Târgu Nistrului, lit. 'Dniester Town'.

== History ==
Historical affiliations

Moldavia 1589–1775
Habsburg monarchy 1775–1804
Austrian Empire 1804–1918
Kingdom of Romania 1918–1940
Soviet Union (Ukrainian SSR) 1940–1941
Kingdom of Romania 1941–1944
Soviet Union (Ukrainian SSR) 1944–1991
Ukraine 1991–present

The first mention in chronicles is dated to 1589. Before 1918 Zastavna was a district centre of Bukovina and a centre of Ukrainian community in the northern part of the region. In 1930 it had approximately 5,100 inhabitants.

Zastavna received town status in 1940. A local newspaper was published since January 1945.

In January 1989 Zastavna's population had reached 9,438 people. By January 2013 it had decreased to 8063 people.

Until 18 July 2020, Zastavna served as an administrative center of Zastavna Raion. The raion was abolished in July 2020 as part of the administrative reform of Ukraine, which reduced the number of raions of Chernivtsi Oblast to three. The area of Zastavna Raion was merged into Chernivtsi Raion.

== Transport ==
The city has a railway station (Lviv Railways)

== Notable people ==
- Mykola Ivasiuk (1865–1937), Ukrainian painter
- Eliyahu Temler (1919–1948), Irgun senior commander

== Gallery ==
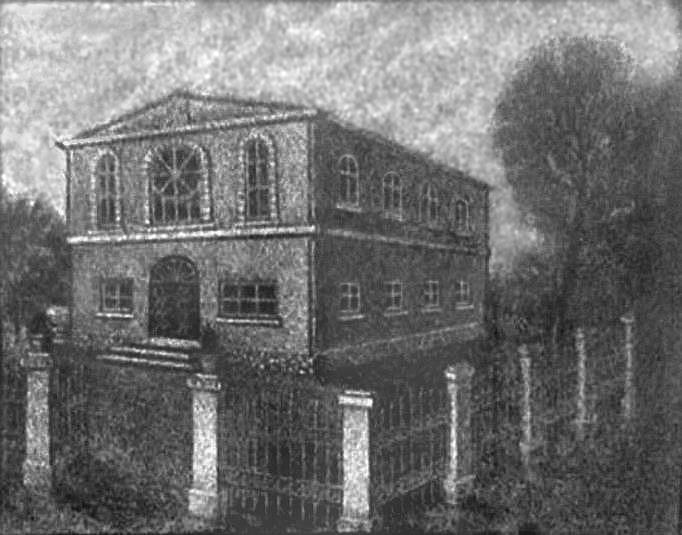
Great synagogue
