= Zastavna Raion =

Former subdivision of Chernivtsi Oblast, Ukraine

Zastavna Raion Заставнівський район, Заставнецкий район
- Raion
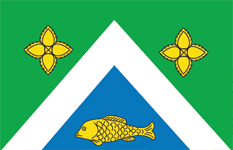
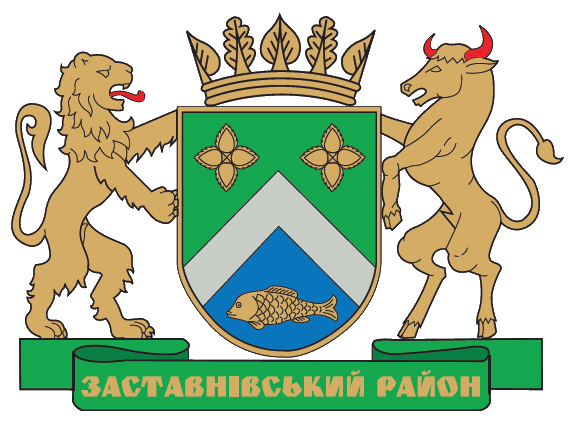
- Flag Coat of arms

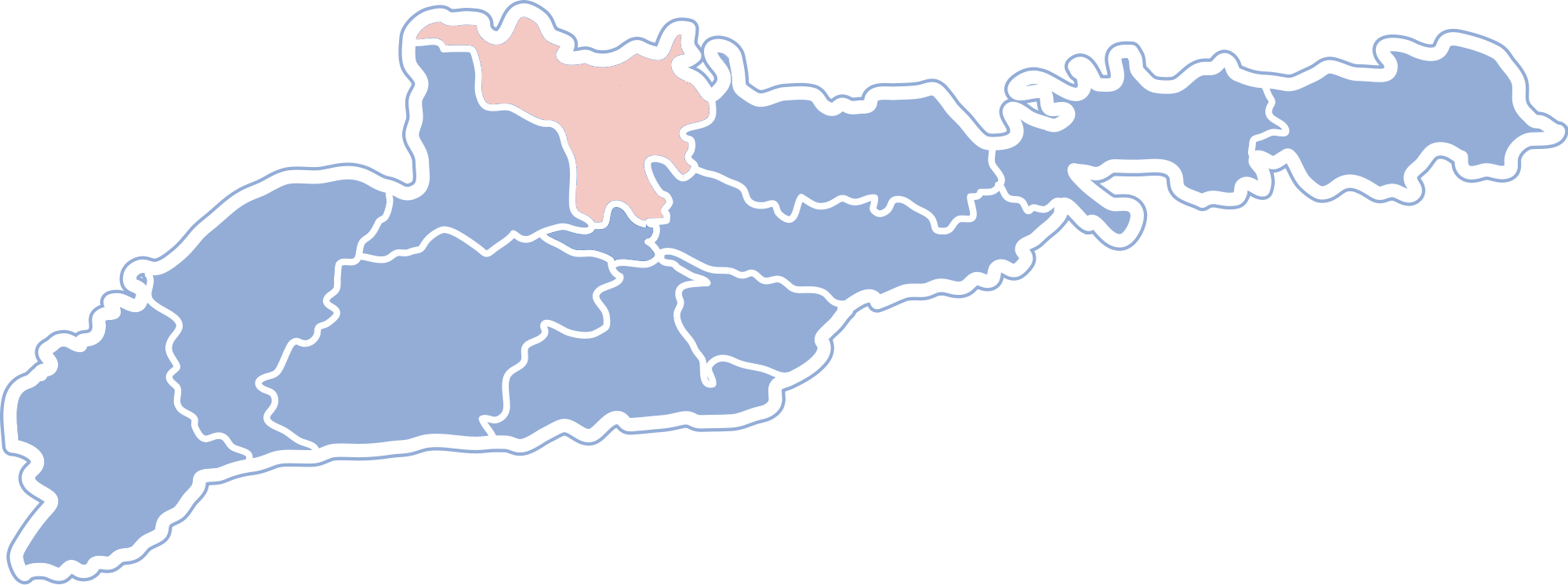
- Country: Ukraine
- Region: Chernivtsi Oblast
- Established: 1940
- Disestablished: 18 July 2020
- Admin. center: Zastavna
- Subdivisions: List: — city councils; — settlement councils; — rural councils; Number of localities: — cities; — urban-type settlements; 37 — villages; — rural settlements

Area
  - Total: 617.7 km^{2} (238.5 sq mi)

Population (2020)
  - Total: 48,198
  - Density: 78.03/km^{2} (202.1/sq mi)
- Time zone: UTC+02:00 (EET)
  - Summer (DST): UTC+03:00 (EEST)
- Postal index: 594xx
- Area code: 380 3737
- Website: http://zastavna.bukoda.gov.ua/

Zastavna Raion (Ukrainian: Заставнівський район. Pokuttia-Bukovina dialect: Заставнецкий район) was an administrative raion (district) in the southern part of Chernivtsi Oblast in western Ukraine, on the Romanian border.

Most of its territory lied in the historical region of Bukovina, while three localities (Balamutivka, Rzhavyntsi, and southern Onut) are located in Bessarabia. The region had an area of 617.7 square kilometres (238.5 mi^{2}) and centered on the city of Zastavna. The raion was abolished on 18 July 2020 as part of the administrative reform of Ukraine, which reduced the number of raions of Chernivtsi Oblast to three. The area of Zastavna Raion was merged into Chernivtsi Raion. The last estimate of the raion population was 48,198 (2020 est.)

At the time of disestablishment, the raion consisted of seven hromadas:

- Horishni Sherivtsi rural hromada with the administration in the selo of Horishni Sherivtsi;
- Kadubivtsi rural hromada with the administration in the selo of Kadubivtsi;
- Kostryzhivka settlement hromada with the administration in the urban-type settlement of Kostryzhivka;
- Verenchanka rural hromada with the administration in the selo of Verenchanka;
- Vikno rural hromada with the administration in the selo of Vikno;
- Yurkivtsi rural hromada with the administration in the selo of Yurkivtsi;
- Zastavna urbam hromada with the administration in Zastavna.

== See also ==
- Subdivisions of Ukraine
