= Chernivtsi Raion =

Subdivision of Chernivtsi Oblast, Ukraine

Chernivtsi Raion Чернівецький район
- Raion
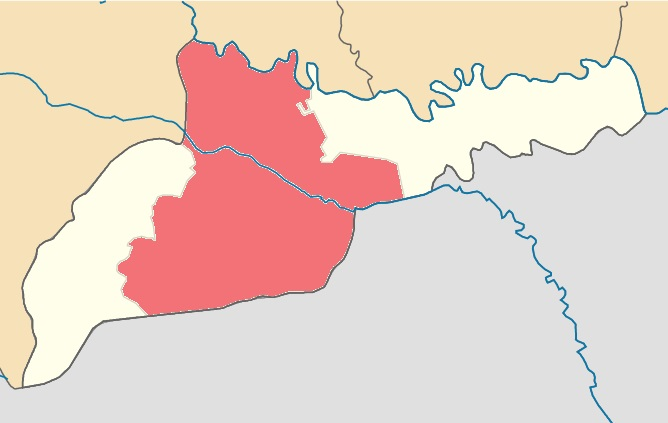
- Map of Chernivtsi Raion
- Interactive map of Chernivtsi Raion
- Coordinates: 48°10′N 25°50′E
- Country: Ukraine
- Oblast: Chernivtsi
- Established: 2020
- Admin. center: Chernivtsi
- Subdivisions: 33 hromadas

Area
  - Total: 4,126 km^{2} (1,593 sq mi)

Population (2022)
  - Total: 648,643
  - Density: 157.2/km^{2} (407.2/sq mi)
- Time zone: UTC+02:00 (EET)
  - Summer (DST): UTC+03:00 (EEST)
- Postal index: N/A

Chernivtsi Raion (Ukrainian: Чернівецький район) is a raion (district) of Chernivtsi Oblast, Ukraine. It was created on 18 July 2020 as part of the reform of administrative divisions of Ukraine. Most of its territory is located in the historical region of Bukovina, while the southeastern parts are in Bessarabia, and the Hertsa region. The center of the raion is the city of Chernivtsi. Four abolished raions, Hertsa, Hlyboka, Storozhynets, and Zastavna Raions, part of abolished Kitsman and Novoselytsia Raions, as well as the city of Chernivtsi, which was previously incorporated as a city of oblast significance, were merged into Chernivtsi Raion. Population: 648,643 (2022 estimate).

== Subdivisions ==
At the time of establishment, the raion consisted of 33 hromadas:

- Boiany rural hromada with the administration in the selo of Boiany, transferred from Novoselytsia Raion;
- Chahor rural hromada with the administration in the selo of Chahor, transferred from Hlyboka Raion;
- Chernivtsi urban hromada with the administration in the city of Chernivtsi, previously incorporated as a city of oblast significance;
- Chudei rural hromada with the administration in the selo of Chudei, transferred from Storozhynets Raion;
- Hertsa urban hromada with the administration in the city of Hertsa, transferred from Hertsa Raion;
- Hlyboka settlement hromada with the administration in the rural settlement of Hlyboka, transferred from Hlyboka Raion;
- Horishni Sherivtsi rural hromada with the administration in the selo of Horishni Sherivtsi, transferred from Zastavna Raion;
- Kadubivtsi rural hromada with the administration in the selo of Kadubivtsi, transferred from Zastavna Raion;
- Kamiana rural hromada with the administration in the selo of Kamiana, transferred from Storozhynets Raion;
- Kamianka rural hromada with the administration in the selo of Kamianka, transferred from Hlyboka Raion;
- Karapchiv rural hromada with the administration in the selo of Karapchiv, transferred from Hlyboka Raion;
- Kitsman urban hromada with the administration in the city of Kitsman, transferred from Kitsman Raion;
- Kostryzhivka settlement hromada with the administration in the rurale settlement of Kostryzhivka, transferred from Zastavna Raion;
- Krasnoilsk settlement hromada with the administration in the rural settlement of Krasnoilsk, transferred from Storozhynets Raion;
- Mahala rural hromada with the administration in the selo of Mahala, transferred from Novoselytsia Raion;
- Mamaivtsi rural hromada with the administration in the selo of Mamaivtsi, transferred from Kitsman Raion;
- Nepolokivtsi settlement hromada with the administration in the rural settlement of Nepolokivtsi, transferred from Kitsman Raion;
- Novoselytsia urban hromada with the administration in the city of Novoselytsia, transferred from Novoselytsia Raion;
- Ostrytsia rural hromada with the administration in the selo of Ostrytsia, transferred from Hertsa Raion;
- Petrivtsi rural hromada with the administration in the selo of Verkhni Petrivtsi, transferred from Storozhynets Raion;
- Stavchany rural hromada with the administration in the selo of Stavchany, transferred from Kitsman Raion;
- Storozhynets urban hromada with the administration in the city of Storozhynets, transferred from Storozhynets Raion;
- Sucheveny rural hromada with the administration in the selo of Sucheveny, transferred from Hlyboka Raion;
- Tarashany rural hromada with the administration in the selo of Tarashany, transferred from Hlyboka Raion;
- Terebleche rural hromada with the administration in the selo of Terebleche, transferred from Hlyboka Raion;
- Toporivtsi rural hromada with the administration in the selo of Toporivtsi, transferred from Novoselytsia Raion;
- Vanchykivtsi rural hromada with the administration in the selo of Vanchykivtsi, transferred from Novoselytsia Raion;
- Velykyi Kuchuriv rural hromada with the administration in the selo of Velykyi Kuchuriv, transferred from Storozhynets Raion;
- Verenchanka rural hromada with the administration in the selo of Verenchanka, transferred from Zastavna Raion;
- Vikno rural hromada with the administration in the selo of Vikno, transferred from Zastavna Raion;
- Voloka rural hromada with the administration in the selo of Voloka, transferred from Hlyboka Raion;
- Yurkivtsi rural hromada with the administration in the selo of Yurkivtsi, transferred from Zastavna Raion;
- Zastavna urban hromada with the administration in the city of Zastavna, transferred from Zastavna Raion.
