= Romanians in Ukraine =

Ethnic group in Ukraine

Romanian Ukrainians
Total population
- 150,989 (2001 census); Additional 258,619 Moldovans (2001 census) (Note: There is an undergoing identity controversy among the Romanian-speakers of Ukraine over whether self-identified Moldovans are a part of the larger Romanian ethnic group or a separate ethnic group.); 500,000 to 800,000 (unofficial estimates)

Regions with significant populations
- Chernivtsi Oblast (12.5% + 7.3% Moldovans), Zakarpattia Oblast (2.6%), Odesa Oblast (5.0%, overwhelmingly self-identified Moldovans)

Languages
- Predominantly Romanian (92.1%), Russian (1.5%), Ukrainian (6.2%)

Religion
- Predominantly Eastern Orthodox/Greek Catholic

This article represents an overview on the history of Romanians in Ukraine, including those Romanians of Northern Bukovina, Zakarpattia, the Hertsa region, and Budjak in Odesa Oblast, but also those Romanophones in the territory between the Dniester River and the Southern Buh river, who traditionally have not inhabited any Romanian state (nor Transnistria), but have been an integral part of the history of modern Ukraine, and are considered natives to the area. There is an ongoing controversy whether self-identified Moldovans are part of the larger Romanian ethnic group or a separate ethnicity. A large majority of the Romanian-speakers living in the former territories of Bukovina and Hertsa region, as well as in Transcarpathia, consider themselves to be ethnic Romanians, but only a minority of those in the historical province of Bessarabia, and the areas further to the east, do. There was a significant decrease in the number of individuals who identified themselves as ethnic Moldovans in the 1989 Soviet census, and a significant increase in the number of self-identified ethnic Romanians, especially, but not exclusively, in northern Bukovina and the Hertsa area according to the 2001 Ukrainian census (see the data later in the article).

== History ==
=== Middle Ages ===
Beginning with the 10th century, the territory was slowly infiltrated by Slavic tribes (Ulichs and Tivertsy) from the north, by Romanians (Vlachs) from the west, as well as by Turkic nomads such as Pechenegs, Cumans and (later) Tatars from the east.

Vlachs and Brodniks are mentioned in the area in the 12th and 13th century. As characterised by contemporary sources, the area between the Southern Bug and Dniester had never been populated by a single ethnicity, or totally controlled by Kievan Rus' or other rulers. Ukrainian historian Volodymyr Antonovych writes: "Neither the right bank, nor the left bank of the Dniester have ever belonged to Galician or other Ruthenian princes."

Since the 14th century, the area was intermittently ruled by Lithuanian dukes, Polish kings, Crimean khans, and Moldavian princes (such as Ion Vodă Armeanul). In 1681 George Ducas's title was "Despot of Moldavia and Ukraine", as he was simultaneously Prince of Moldavia and Hetman of Ukraine. Other Moldavian princes who held control of the territory in 17th and 18th centuries were Ștefan Movilă, Dimitrie Cantacuzino, and Mihai Racoviţă.

=== Modern Age ===
The end of the 18th century marked Imperial Russia's colonization of the region, as a result of which large migrations into the region were encouraged, including people of Ukrainian, Russian, and German ethnicity. The process of Russification and colonization of this territory started to be carried out by representatives of other ethnic groups of the Russian Empire.

While the Ruthenian ethnic element is fundamental for Cossacks, some have claimed a considerable number of Romanians among the hetmans of the Cossacks (i.e. Ioan Potcoavă, Grigore Lobodă (Hryhoriy Loboda), who ruled in 1593–1596), Ioan Sârcu (Ivan Sirko), who ruled in 1659–1660, Dănilă Apostol (Danylo Apostol), who ruled in 1727–1734, Alexander Potcoavă, Constantin Potcoavă, Petre Lungu, Petre Cazacu, Tihon Baibuza, Samoilă Chişcă, Opară, Trofim Voloşanin, Ion Şărpilă, Timotei Sgură, Dumitru Hunu), and other high-ranking Cossacks (Polkovnyks Toader Lobădă and Dumitraşcu Raicea in Pereiaslav, Martin Puşcariu in Poltava, Burlă in Gdańsk, Pavel Apostol in Myrhorod, Eremie Gânju and Dimitrie Băncescu in Uman, Varlam Buhăţel, Grigore Gămălie in Lubensk, Grigore Cristofor, Ion Ursu, Petru Apostol in Lubensk).

After 1812, the Russian Empire annexed Bessarabia from the Ottoman Empire. Romanians under Russian rule enjoyed privileges well, the language of Moldavians was established as an official language in the governmental institutions of Bessarabia, used along with Russian. Though no census was conducted at the time, Romanian authors have claimed that 95% of the population was Romanian.

The publishing works established by Archbishop Gavril Bănulescu-Bodoni were able to produce books and liturgical works in Moldovan between 1815 and 1820, until the period from 1871 to 1905, when Russification policies were implemented that all public use of Romanian was phased out, and substituted with Russian. Romanian continued to be used as the colloquial language of home and family, mostly spoken by Romanians, either first or second language.

Many Romanians changed their family names to Russian. This was the era of the highest level of assimilation in the Russian Empire. In 1872, the priest Pavel Lebedev ordered that all church documents be written in Russian, and, in 1882, the press at Chișinău was closed by order of the Holy Synod.

Historically, the Orthodox Church in today's Transnistria and Ukraine was subordinated at first to the Mitropolity of Proilava (modern Brăila, Romania). Later, it belonged to the Bishopric of Huşi. After the Russian annexation of 1792, the Bishopric of Ochakiv reverted to Ekaterinoslav (modern Dnipro). From 1837, it belonged to the Eparchys of Kherson with its seat in Odesa, and Taurida with its seat in Simferopol.

==== The Soviet Union ====
The population of the former Moldavian ASSR, as a part of the Ukrainian Soviet Socialist Republic (Ukrainian SSR), had also suffered the Holodomor, the famine of the 1930s that caused several millions deaths in Ukraine.

==== Autonomous Moldavian Republic in Soviet Ukraine ====
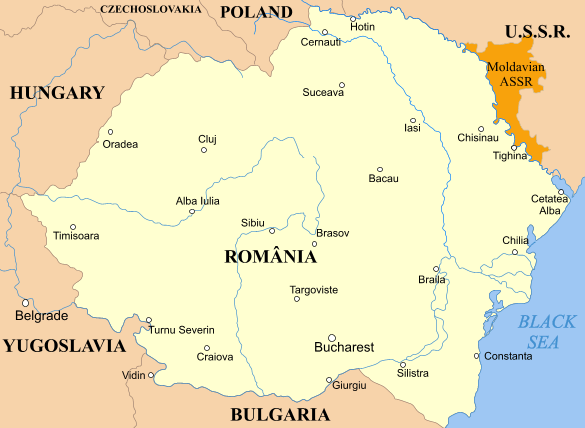
Moldavian ASSR (in orange) and Romania

At the end of World War I in 1918, the Directory of Ukraine proclaimed the sovereignty of the Ukrainian People's Republic over the left bank of the Dneister. After the end of World War I in 1918, Bukovina (formerly ruled by Austria-Hungary) and Bessarabia were united with Kingdom of Romania; and after the Russian Civil War ended, in 1922, the Ukrainian SSR was created. Bukovina and Bessarabia were historically populated by the Romanians and Ukrainians for hundreds of years.

The very term "Ukrainians" was prohibited from the official usage and some populations of disputable Ukrainian ethnicity were rather called the "citizens of Romania who forgot their native language" and were forced to change their last names to Romanian-sounding ones. Among those who were Romanianized were descendants of Romanians who were assimilated to Ukrainian society in the past.

As such, according to the Romanian census, of the total population of 805,000, 74% were Romanians; the number included the Ukrainians and other possibly related Ukrainian ethnic groups Hutsuls referred to as "Romanians who forgot their native language". Among Russians who were Romanianized in Bessarabia were descendants of Romanians who underwent Russification policies during Russian rule.

The geopolitical concept of an autonomous Transnistrian region was born in 1924, when Bessarabian-Russian military leader Grigory Kotovsky founded, under the auspices of Moscow, the Moldavian Autonomous Oblast, which on 12 October 1924 became the Moldavian ASSR of the Ukrainian SSR.

The intention of Soviet policy was to promote Communism in recently lost Bessarabia and surroundings, and eventually to regain the former province from Romania. (Soviet authorities declared the "temporarily occupied city of Chişinău" as de jure capital of the ASSR.) The area was 8,100 km^{2} (3,100 sq mi) and included 11 raions by the left bank of Dniester.

==== Moldavian SSR ====
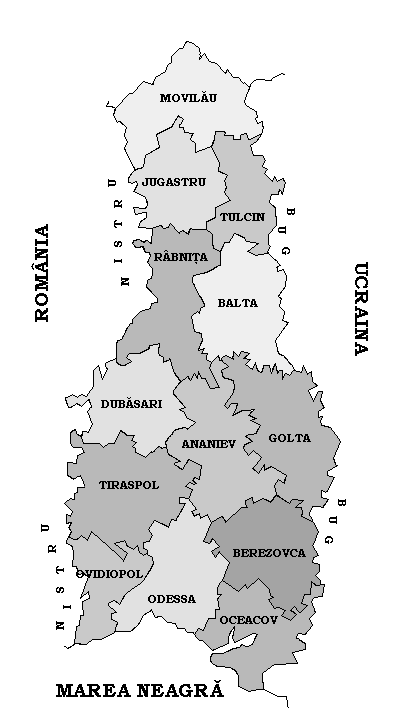
Romania occupied (August 19, 1941 - January 29, 1944) the "Transnistrian" region between Dniester, Southern Bug rivers and Black Sea coast.

In 1940, under duress from a Soviet ultimatum issued to the Romanian ambassador in Moscow and under pressure from Italy and Germany, Romania ceded Bessarabia and Bukovina to the USSR. As many as 90,000 died as the Red Army entered and occupied the territory on June 28. The official Soviet press declared that the "peaceful policy of the USSR" had "liquidated the [Bessarabian] Soviet-Romanian conflict".

The Moldavian SSR was created from Bessarabia and the western part of the Moldavian ASSR. Bessarabian territory along the Black Sea and Danube, where Romanians were in the minority, was merged into the Ukrainian SSR to ensure its control by a stable Soviet republic. The Romanian population of Ukraine was persecuted by Soviet authorities on ethnic grounds, especially in the years following the annexation until 1956; because of this, Russification laws were imposed again on Romanian population. On October 11, 1942, the (Soviet) State Committee on Defense decided to extend the decrees on "the mobilization of the NKVD labour columns, German men, able to work, 17-50 years old - to the persons of other nations, being in war with USSR-Romanians, Hungarians, Italians, Finns."; the order was signed by Stalin. As a result, in May 1944, in the village of Molodiia and some other northern Bukovinian localities, those men who declared a "Moldovan" nationality were incorporated into the Soviet army, while those who declared a "Romanian" nationality were sent to the work camps in the area of Lake Onega, where most of them died. The late Israeli scholar, mainly a Holocaust specialist, Dov Levin has made available statistics that showed that there were no representatives in the organs of Soviet power, etc., in Hertsa and the Bukovinian raions of the Chernivtsi region with a Moldovan identity in 1940-1941, but only with a Romanian one; the birth and death statistics and those on the number of students during the same period show the same thing. In March 1945, 3,967 ethnic Romanians from Ukraine, mostly from the Chernivtsi Oblast, were sent to the Soviet east. The Soviet era dominance of the "Moldovan" identity in parts of northern Bukovina was due to the fact that the inhabitants of the Chernivtsi and Sadagura rural raions, and of the Bukovinian part of the Novoselytsia raion, were pressured in 1944 to adopt a "Moldovan" national/ethnic identity. In neighboring Bessarabia the same persecution did not have a predominantly ethnic orientation, being based mostly on social, educational, and political grounds.

==== Transnistria (WWII) ====
Having allied with Nazi Germany, and having recaptured the territories occupied by the Soviets in 1940, Romanian dictator Antonescu did not heed the counsel of his advisers and continued to wage war on the Soviets beyond Romania's pre-war boundaries, invading parts of Ukraine and occupying the territory between Dniester and Southern Buh rivers. During this period the Romanian and German authorities and units deported to this region 147,000 Bessarabian and Bukovinian Jews, 30,000 Romanian Roma, and exterminated the largest part of the local Jewish population of this region. In 1944, the Soviets re-conquered the area.

=== Post-independence Ukraine ===
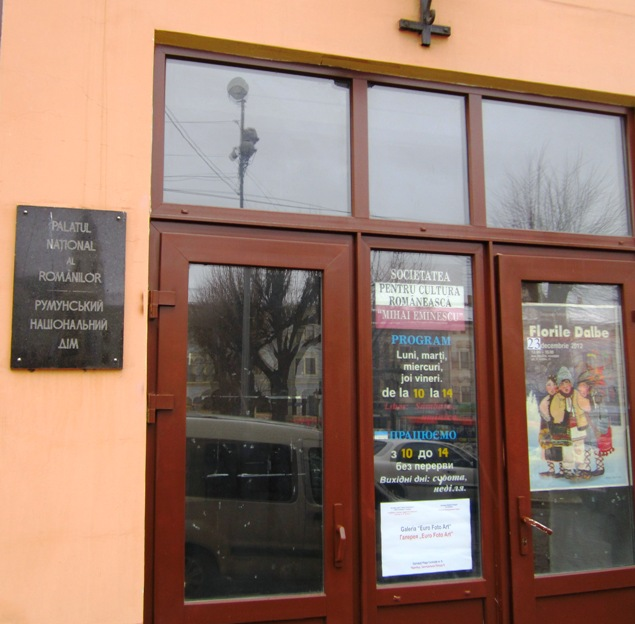
The National Palace of the Romanians in Chernivtsi, 2013

In post-Soviet times, Ukrainian, the language of the historical ethnic/linguistic majority, is constitutionally the sole state language, and the state system of higher education has been switched to Ukrainian.

In June 1997 Romania and Ukraine signed a bilateral treaty which included addressing territorial and minority issues. By the terms of the agreement, Ukraine guaranteed the rights of Romanians in Ukraine and Romania guaranteed the rights of Ukrainians in Romania. There are schools teaching Romanian as a primary language, along with newspapers, TV, and radio broadcasting in Romanian.

There are allegations that in the 2001 Ukrainian census, individuals, especially, but not exclusively, in the Odesa region were threatened with dismissal from their jobs if they declared that they were Romanians rather than Moldovans by ethnicity, and it has been claimed that the ethnicity of some individuals was listed arbitrarily by census-takers who did not even ask those individuals what their ethnicity was. According to Kateryna Sheshtakova, a professor at the Pomeranian University of Slutsk in Poland who did field research among the 15 self-identified Romanians and self-identified Moldovans in the Chernivtsi region of Ukraine, 'Some Moldovans use both names of the mother tongue (Moldovan or Romanian) and accordingly declare two ethnic affiliations.' She recorded one statement that "I am Moldovan, but to be more precise, we should say I am Romanian". She also recorded an exchange that indicated that a respondent indicated that the language had been transformed from Moldovan to Romanian. "That language, is it Romanian or Moldovan? R: Now, it's Romanian. There is no Moldovan now. Then, it used to be Moldovan, but written with Russian letters. And now everything is in Latin (Mk38). Shestakova suggests that those self-identified Moldovans who see differences between Moldovan and Romanian tend to be from "the older generation". Opinion polling from the Chernivtsi oblast, as well as the discussions of the delegates of the Meeting of the Leaders of the Romanophone Organizations from Ukraine of December 6, 1996, indicated that many of the self-identified Moldovans believed that the Moldovan and Romanian languages were identical. By comparison, in the Republic of Moldova, “more than half of the self-proclaimed Moldovans (53.5%) said that they saw no difference” between the Romanian and Moldovan languages according to a survey conducted by Pal Kolsto and Hans Olav Melberg in 1998 which also included the Transnistrian separatist region. According to Alla Skvortsova, an ethnic Russian researcher from the Republic of Moldova, "Our survey found that while 94.4 percent of the Romanians living in Moldova consider Moldovan and Romanian to be the same language, only half of the Moldovans (53.2 percent) share this view".

In 2015, several news websites published a report claiming that the Romanians of Northern Bukovina had formed an "Assembly of the Romanians of Bukovina" and demanded the territorial autonomy of the region from Ukraine. However, they were claimed to be fake and a product of pro-Russian anti-Ukrainian websites.

After 2014, the Romanians of Ukraine were subjected to forced Ukrainization by the Ukrainian authorities, despite constant objection of the Romanian authorities, with some Romanian organizations in Ukraine even calling it a cultural genocide.

=== Situation after the Russian invasion of Ukraine ===
Following the 2022 Russian invasion of Ukraine and the formal start of Ukraine's accession into the European Union, notable improvements in the rights of the Romanians and other minorities in Ukraine were introduced.

In 2022 and 2023, the Verkhovna Rada (Ukraine's parliament) adopted and amended laws that enshrined the rights of "national minorities" and allowed "holding public and cultural events and publishing advertisements fully in the language of national minorities within the given community."

Modern mass media of the Romanians in Ukraine include the newspapers Zorile Bucovinei, Concordia, Libertatea Cuvântului, Gazeta de Herța and several more, as well as some TV and radio channels.

On 16 November, the Ministry of Education and Science and the Ukrainian government stated that it has initiated steps to replace the term "Moldovan language" with "Romanian language". The Ukrainian Ministry of Education stated that ‘The Government of Ukraine adopted a decision regarding the use of the term "Romanian language" instead of the term "Moldovan language" in Ukraine. Currently, work is underway to bring the current legislation of Ukraine in line with this decision, which includes many internal regulatory legal acts. Separately, we note that all further acts of the government will be adopted considering the agreements. And all civil servants who allow violations of the government's decision will be subject to disciplinary action. The facts reported in the media regarding the printed textbooks refer to the copies approved for printing in May this year. The main edition of these textbooks was printed in the summer before the decision was made not to use the term "Moldovan language". Today, the Ministry of Education and Science of Ukraine has stopped any additional printing of these textbooks. And also develops a mechanism for replacing previously printed copies with textbooks in the Romanian language.' On 13 January 2024, the Ukrainian newspaper Dumska indicated that the last three schools had just changed the name of the language from "Moldovan" to "Romanian". On 3 December 2025, the Ukrainian parliament excluded "Moldovan" and Russian from Ukraine's list of languages protected in accordance with the European Charter for Regional or Minority Languages. On 12 June 2026, Volodymyr Zelenskyy, then President of Ukraine, signed the document, with it entering into force the next day.

On 8 August 2025, Romanian Foreign Minister Oana Țoiu announced that the Romanian Language Day would become an official celebration in Ukraine. On 12 March 2026, Zelenskyy signed a decree formally establishing the holiday every 31 August. In addition, on 8 May that year, Ukraine included Romania together with 27 other named countries in its list of states whose citizens could hold dual citizenship. Ukraine's previous law regarding citizenship had dissatisfied the Romanian minority of the country. It was officially announced shortly after on 26 June that Moldova had also been included on the list.

In August 2026, the tomb of George D. Gallin, who was consul of the Kingdom of Romania in Chernivtsi, was restored after 86 years of no maintenance, having been vandalized during Soviet rule. Gallin's tomb, located in the historic cemetery of Chernivtsi, was restored with financial support from the Romanian government's Department for Romanians Everywhere. A reorganization of the school network in Odesa Oblast erupted various problems in 2026 regarding the continuity of some Romanian-language schools and classes, which sparked in Novoselivka (Satu-Nou) in June, Borysivka (Borisăuca) in July and Orlivka (Cartal) in September; all three conflicts were eventually resolved.

On 12 October 2026, a law regarding the educational rights of ethnic minorities in Ukraine was passed by the Verkhovna Rada and promulgated by Zelenskyy on the same day. The law introduced numerous guarantees for minorities, its promulgation being welcomed by the President of Romania Nicușor Dan the next day, but organizations representing the Romanian community in Ukraine criticized several provisions of the law and requested additional guarantees.

== Language and demographics ==
According to the Soviet 1989 census, Romanian speakers accounted for just under one percent of Ukraine's total population: 134,825 Romanians, and 324,525 Moldovans with the largest minority in Chernivtsi (approximately one fifth of the region's population). According to the U.S. Census Bureau, in 2015, there were 1,438 ethnic Romanians born in Ukraine living in the United States of America. By comparison, there were also 237,809 ethnic Ukrainians born in Ukraine living in the U.S. in that year. According to the 2001 Ukrainian census, 92.1% of those who stated that they were Romanians declared Romanian as their mother tongue, 6.2% Ukrainian, and 1.5% Russian. Among census Moldovans, 71.1% listed Moldovan or Romanian as their mother tongue, 17.6% listed Russian and 10.7% listed Ukrainian.

Romanian speakers are not, as of 28 September 2017, allowed to learn exclusively in the Romanian language in the Ukrainian state education system after four years of education, with Romanian language instruction being restricted to separate Romanian language and literature classes. Whereas, the Ukrainian migrants, as well as the ethnic Ukrainians who have lived in Romania for centuries, benefit from Ukrainian language classes in Romania and their state TV is broadcast on Romanian state's television at a chosen prefixed time slot.

In the last Soviet census of 1989, out of 940,801 inhabitants of the Chernivtsi oblast, 666,095 declared themselves Ukrainians (70.8%), 100,317 Romanians (10.66%), 84,519 Moldovans (8.98%), and 63,066 Russians (6.7%). The decline in the number (from 84,519 to 67,225) and proportion of self-identified Moldovans (from 8.98% to 7.31%) was explained by a switch from a census Moldovan to a census Romanian ethnic identity, and has continued after the 2001 census. By contrast, the number of self-identified ethnic Romanians has increased (from 100,317 to 114,555), and so has their proportion of the population of the oblast (from 10.66% to 12.46%), and the process has continued after the 2001 census.

In 1989, in the Chernivtsi oblast of Soviet Ukraine, there were 53,211 self-identified ethnic Romanians who declared their native language to be Romanian, and 32,412 who declared it to be Moldovan. There were also 80,637 Moldovans who declared their language as Moldovan, and 1 who declared it as Romanian in the same oblast. In 2001, in the Chernivtsi oblast of independent Ukraine, there were 105,296 self-identified ethnic Romanians who declared their native language to be Romanian, and 467 who declared it to be Moldovan. There were also 61,598 Moldovans who declared their language as Moldovan, and 2,657 who declared it as Romanian in the same oblast. Therefore, the number of self-identified ethnic Romanians who declared their language to be Romanian increased by 97.88% between 1989 and 2001. By contrast, the number of ethnic Moldovans who declared their language to be Moldovan decreased by 23.31%. Among those who declared their ethnicity as Romanian or Moldovan, there was an increase in the number of people calling their language as Romanian from 53,212 to 107,953, an increase of 102.87%. By contrast, there was decrease in the number of such people who declared their language as Moldovan from 113,049 to 62,065, a decrease of 45.1%. The eighteen villages in the Hlyboka Raion, the Novoselytsia Raion and the Hertsa Raion of historical Bukovina and the Hertsa area in 1989 with a significant Romanian-speaking populations, most of which declared a Moldovan ethnic identity in 1989, had 15,412 individuals who overwhelmingly declared their language to be Romanian in 2001 (55.91% of the local Romanian-speakers), and 12,156 who called it Moldovan in the same year (44.09% of the local Romanian-speakers).

Some authors have argued that most of the inhabitants of the former Hertsa Raion of the Chernivtsi Oblast who had self-identified themselves as Moldovans in 1989 self-identified themselves as Romanians in 2001. In 2001, the population of the Hertsa Raion of the Chernivtsi Oblast was 32,316, of which 29,554 or 91.45% identified themselves as Romanians, 1,616 or 5.0% as Ukrainians, and 756 or 2.34% as Moldovans (out of which 511 self-identified their language as Moldovan and 237 as Romanian), 0.9% as Russians, and 0.3% as being of other ethnicities (see: Ukrainian Census, 2001). In the last Soviet census of 1989, out of 29,611 inhabitants of the same raion, 1,569 declared themselves Ukrainians (5.30%), 23,539 Romanians (79.49%), 3,978 Moldovans (13.43%), and 431 Russians (1.46%). The decline in the number (from 3,978 to 756) and proportion of Moldovans (from 13.43% to 2.34%) was explained by a switch from a census Moldovan to a census Romanian ethnic identity, and has continued after the 2001 census. By contrast, the number of self-identified ethnic Romanians has increased (from 23,539 to 29,554), and so has their proportion of the population of the former raion (from 79.49% to 91.45%), and the process has continued after the 2001 census. For example, in the village of Ostrytsia in the Hertsa Raion, in 2001, 93.73% of the inhabitants spoke Romanian as their native language (93.22% self-declared Romanian and 0.52% self-declared Moldovan), while 4.96% spoke Ukrainian. In the Soviet census of 1989, the number of inhabitants who declared themselves Romanians plus Moldovans was 2,965 (324, or 10.05% Romanians plus 2,641 or 81.92% Moldovans) out of 3,224, representing 91.97% of the locality's population, and there were 205 ethnic Ukrainians (6.36%). Similar patterns could be observed in other villages, such as Tsuren in the former Hertsa Raion, Boyany and Cotul Ostritei in the former Novoselytsia Raion, Voloka in the former Hlyboka Raion, etc. The Soviet era dominance of the "Moldovan" identity was due to the fact that the inhabitants of the Chernivtsi and Sadagura rural raions, of the Bukovinian part of the Novoselytsia rural raion, as well as of Ukrainian northern Bessarabia, were pressured in 1944 to adopt a "Moldovan" national/ethnic identity.

Some authors have argued that most of the inhabitants of the former Hlyboka Raion who had self-identified themselves as Moldovans in 1989 self-identified themselves as Romanians in 2001. According to the Ukraine Census (2001), the 72,676 residents of the Hlyboka Raion reported themselves as following: Ukrainians: 34,025 (46.82%), Romanians: 32,923 (45.3%), Moldovans: 4,425 (6.09%), Russians: 877 (1.21%), and other: 426 (0.59%). Hlyboka raion, within its boundaries at that time, had 72,676 inhabitants in 2001, including 52.56% Ukrainian-speakers, 45.97% Romanian-speakers, and 1.15% Russian-speakers. In 1989, in the last Soviet census of 1989, out of 68,009 inhabitants, 27,407 declared themselves Ukrainians (40.3%), 29,042 Romanians (42.7%), 9,644 Moldovans (14.18%), and 1,363 Russians (2%). The decline in the number (from 9,644 to 4,425) and proportion of self-identified Moldovans (from 14.18% to 6.09%) was explained by a switch from a census Moldovan to a census Romanian ethnic identity, and has continued after the 2001 census. By contrast, the number of self-identified ethnic Romanians has increased (from 29,042 to 32,923), and so has their proportion of the population of the former raion (from 42.7% to 45.3%), and the process has continued after the 2001 census. On the basis of the 1989 and 2001 census data, included those listed above, some authors have stated and argued that most of the inhabitants of historical northern Bukovina and of the Hertsa area who had been counted as Moldovan and Moldovan-speakers during the Soviet period indicated a Romanian ethnic and linguistic identity in 2001. Among the several localities in which a majority of the Romanian plus Moldovan population changed its ethnic and linguistic identity from Moldovan to Romanian between the two censuses were Voloka and Valia Kuzmyna (see the details in the articles on the villages).

Some authors have argued that many of the inhabitants of the former Novoselytsia Raion in the smaller, former Bukovinian area of the raion, who had self-identified themselves as Moldovans in 1989 self-identified themselves as Romanians in 2001. This was the case in a number of localities such as Boiany. In 2001, 92.16% of the population of 4,425 inhabitants of Boyany spoke Romanian as their native language, 4,078 people (including 2,810 who declared it as Romanian or 63.50%, and 1,268 as Moldovan, or 28.66%), with a minority of Ukrainian speakers (6.33%). According to the 1989 Soviet census, the number of inhabitants who declared themselves Romanian plus Moldovan was 3,764 (40 Romanians, or 0.94% plus 3,724 Moldovans, or 87.64%), representing 88.59% of the population of 4,249 inhabitants. A similar pattern could be found, for example, in the village of Ostrytsia of the Mahala urban hromada; see the article on the village of Mahala, Chernivtsi Oblast. However, in a number of other localities, such as the village of Mahala, only a large minority of the Romanian-speaking population did so by 2001. From 1991 to 2020, the village of Mahala was a part of the Noua Suliță/Novoselytsia Raion of the Chernivtsi region of independent Ukraine. According to the 1989 census, the number of inhabitants of Mahala who declared themselves Romanians plus Moldovans was 2,231 (16 + 2,215), representing 90.40% of the population. In 2001, 92.52% of the inhabitants spoke Romanian (59.91% self-identified Moldovan and 32.60% self-identified Romanian) as their native language, with Ukrainian (5.96%) and Russian (1.45%) speakers in the minority. In the formerly Bukovinian villages in the Boiany rural hromada and the Mahala rural hromada, where the inhabitants overwhelmingly declared their ethnic identity as Moldovan in 1989, there were 18,331 inhabitants in 2001, including 7,589 (41.4%) who declared their native language as Moldovan, 5,690 (31.04%) who declared it to be Romanian, 4,815 (26.27%) who declared it Ukrainian, and 198 (1.08%) who declared it be Russian. The self-declared Romanian speakers were thus 42.85% of the Romanian-speaking population of this Bukovinian area, while 57.15% called their language Moldovan.

Most of the Bessarabian part of the former raion is made up of the Novoselytsia urban hromada and the Vanchykivtsi rural hromada, which had 48,642 inhabitants in 2001; out of these, 29,875 (61.42%) declared themselves as Moldovan-speakers, 15,431 as Ukrainian-speakers (31.72%), 2,114 as Romanian-speakers (4.35%) and 1,148 (2.36%) as Russian-speakers. The self-declared Romanian speakers were thus 6.61% of the Romanian-speaking population of the area. In a minority of the localities in the Bessarabian part of the Novoselytsia Raion of the Chernivtsi Oblast, which formed a large majority of the population of the raion, there was an increase from less than 1% self-identified ethnic Romanians, and an even lower percentage who stated that their language was Romanian (see the data for the entire raion below) in 1989 to 26-29% self-identified Romanian-speakers (as distinct from self-identified Moldovan-speakers) in 2001, and a smaller increase in the proportion of self-identified Romanians. These include, for example, Cherlenivka and Dynivtsi. This parallels similar developments in the Republic of Moldova, where the number of self-identified ethnic Romanians as measured by the censuses increased from 2.477 (0.1%) in 1989 to 192,800 in 2014 (7%). In the Novoselytsia Raion as a whole, the number of individuals who declared that their native language was Romanian increased from 315 (out of 585 individuals who declared a Romanian ethnicity and only 0.36% of the raion's population) in 1989 to 8,076 (9.23%) self-declared Romanians plus Moldovans and 8,131 (9.3%) such inhabitants overall in 2001. In the overwhelmingly Bessarabian Novoselytsia Raion as a whole, the number of individuals who declared that their ethnicity was Romanian increased from 585 individuals (0.67%) in 1989 to 5,904 (6.75%) individuals in 2001. Additional demographic information on the population with a Moldovan ethnic identity in Ukraine that is regarded as ethnically Romanian by the self-identified ethnic Romanians in Ukraine and elsewhere may be found in the article Moldovans in Ukraine.

Historical population
| Year | Pop. | ±% |
|---|---|---|
| 1926 | 1,530 | — |
| 1939 | 825 | −46.1% |
| 1959 | 100,863 | +12125.8% |
| 1970 | 112,141 | +11.2% |
| 1979 | 121,795 | +8.6% |
| 1989 | 134,825 | +10.7% |
| 2001 | 151,989 | +12.7% |
Soviet and Ukrainian censuses

=== Romanian communities in present-day Ukraine ===
Romanians in Ukraine - Oblast level (2001)
| Region | Population |
|---|---|
| Chernivtsi Oblast | There were 114,555 Romanians (12.5%) in 2001; the rest of the inhabitants were Moldovans (7.31% or 67,225), Ukrainians (74.98% or 689,056), and Russians (4.12% or 37,881). According to the 2001 census, the majority of the population of the Chernivtsi region (919,028) was Ukrainian-speaking (75.57%), and there were also Romanian (18.64%) and Russian (5.27%) speakers. |
| Zakarpattia Oblast | There were 32,668 Romanians (2.6% of the oblast population in 2001), mainly living in Tiachiv Raion with, 21,420 (12.46% of the rayon population) and Rachiv with 10,573 (11.63% of the rayon population). Some 10,000–15,000 also live in the northern part of the oblast, far from other Romanian communities, and are referred to as volohi in Romanian. They are also controversially referred to as țigani albi ("White Gypsies") by some researchers. |
| Odesa Oblast | There were 724 self-identified ethnic Romanians (0.03%); there were also 123,751 self-identified ethnic Moldovans (5.04%) in 2001, 1,542,341 self-identified ethnic Ukrainians (62.81%), 508,537 self-identified ethnic Russians (20.71%) and 150,683 Bulgarians (6.14%). According to the 2001 Ukrainian census, Ukrainian was the mother tongue of 46.3% of the population (2,368,107 in 2001), for 42.0% it was Russian, for 4.9% Bulgarian, and for 3.8% Romanian. There were 700 self-identified ethnic Romanians in the oblast in 1989. |
| Total | There were 150,989 self-identified Romanians. |

Raions with significant Romanian population (2001)
| Raion | Population |
|---|---|
| Hertsa Raion | There were 29,554 Romanians (91.5%) in 2001; other inhabitants included 1,616 Ukrainians (5.0% ), 756 Moldovans (2.3%), and Russians (0.9%). Hertsa raion, within its boundaries at that time, had 32,316 inhabitants in 2001, including 4.83% Ukrainian-speakers, 93.82% Romanian-speakers, and 1.21% Russian-speakers. |
| Hlyboka Raion | There were 72,676 inhabitants, of which 32,923 were Romanians (45.30%) in 2001. Hlyboka raion, within its boundaries at that time, had 72,676 inhabitants in 2001, including 52.56% Ukrainian-speakers, 45.97% Romanian-speakers, and 1.15% Russian-speakers. |
| Novoselytsia Raion | There were 87,461 inhabitants, of which 5,904 were Romanians (6.75%) in 2001. The other inhabitants included 50,329 Moldovans (57.54%), 29,703 Ukrainians (35.05%), 1,235 Russians (1.42%), and 290 others (0.29%). Novoselytsia raion, within its boundaries at that time, had 87,241 inhabitants in 2001, including 34.08% Ukrainian-speakers, 64% Romanian-speakers, and 1.78% Russian-speakers. |
| Storozhynets Raion | There were 95,295 inhabitants in 2001, of which 35,095 were Romanians (36.83%). In 2001, the inhabitants of the Storozhynets raion were 61.42% Ukrainian-speakers, 35.64% Romanian-speakers, and 1.81% Russian-speakers. |

Romanians in Ukraine - settlement level
| Settlement | Population |
|---|---|
| Boiany | It had 4,425 inhabitants, including 2,810 Romanians (63.50%), and 92.16% of the inhabitants spoke Romanian as their native language. |
| Chernivtsi | In 2001, population was 236,691, of which 10,553 (4.5%) were Romanians. The city of Chernivtsi had 236,691 inhabitants in 2001, of which 187,465 spoke Ukrainian (79.20%), 10,263 Romanian (4.34%), 284 Polish (0.11%), and 36,150 Russian (15.27%). According to a survey conducted by the International Republican Institute in April–May 2023, 82% of the city's population spoke Ukrainian at home, 15% spoke Russian, and 2% spoke Romanian. |
| Hertsa | The town has a large Romanian majority; 71.18% identified themselves as Romanians, 17.88% as Ukrainians, 6.35% as Russians and 3.4% as Moldovans. The majority of the population of Herța was Romanian-speaking (70.79%), with Ukrainian (17.98%) and Russian (10.89%) speakers in the minority. |
| Hlyboka | According to the 1989 census, the number of Romanians/Moldovans was 20.11%; 12.15% spoke Romanian as their native language according to the 2001 census. |
| Krasnoilsk | According to the 2001 Ukrainian census, the town had 9,142 people, out of which almost all are Romanians, and 92.64% were Romanian-speaking. |
| Novoselytsia, | The city has a population of 8,166 people, mainly Ukrainians, with a Romanian community. The distribution of the population by native language in 2001 was Ukrainian 54.9%, Romanian 34.5%, and Russian 10.1%. Moreover, in 2001, 1.63% of the inhabitants declared that they were Romanian, while 54.37% ethnically Ukrainian, 35.82% Moldovan, and 6.84% Russian. |
| Storozhynets | The city has a population of 14,693 people in 2001, and 81% of the inhabitants spoke Ukrainian as their native language, while 11.45% spoke Romanian, and 6.56% spoke Russian. In 2001, the population was 74.31% ethnically Ukrainian, 17.23% Romanian, 4.91% Russian and 2.2% Polish. |
| Solotvyno | The town has a population of 8,956 inhabitants in 2001, 56.97% of whom spoke Romanian as their native language, while 14.54% spoke Ukrainian, 24.3% Hungarian, and 3.18% Russian. |

== Notable individuals ==
Notable Romanians (or individuals with partial Romanian ancestry) in Ukraine include:

- Alexandru Averescu - Marshal of Romania and Prime Minister of Romania
- Ivan Balan - footballer
- Ivo Bobul - singer
- Aurica Bojescu - lawyer, minority rights activist and politician
- Maksym Braharu - footballer
- Alexandrina Cernov - academic, literary historian and philologist
- Serghei Covalciuc - footballer
- Nikolay Florea - astronomer
- Alina Grosu - singer
- Maria Iliuț - folk singer
- Kyrylo Kovalchuk - footballer
- Yevhen Levytskyi - diplomat
- Longinus (Jar) - Metropolitan of the Ukrainian Orthodox Church
- Nataliia Lupu - athlete
- Alexander Marinesko - naval officer
- Heorhiy Mazurashu - sports journalist and Verkhovna Rada member
- Petro Mohyla - Orthodox metropolitan
- Igor Moiseyev - choreographer
- Ilie Motrescu - writer and publicist
- Volodymyr Muntyan - footballer
- Mihail Pop - economist and politician in Moldova
- Ion Popescu - politician
- Maxim Prodan - boxer
- Vitaliy Pushkutsa - footballer
- Teofil Rendyuk - diplomat
- Paun Rohovei - diplomat
- Sofia Rotaru - singer
- Miroslava Șandru - ethnographer and folklorist
- Lilia Sandulesu - pop singer
- Siluan (Ciornei) - bishop of the Ukrainian Orthodox Church
- Nichita Smochină - scholar and political figure
- Oleksandr Stoyka - bishop of Mukachevo
- Vasile Tărâțeanu - writer and activist
- Eugen Tomac - historian and politician
- Pavlo Unguryan - conservative politician and Evangelical leader
- Mykola Vasylko - diplomat
- Arseniy Yatsenyuk - Prime Minister of Ukraine

== See also ==
- Romanian Orthodox Church in Ukraine
- Demographics of Ukraine
- Moldovans in Ukraine
- Hertsa region
- Northern Maramureș
- New Serbia, a province in the Russian Empire that had a majority of colonists from Moldavia
- Slavo-Serbia, a province of the Russian Empire that had a notable minority of Romanian colonists
- Romania–Ukraine relations
- Ukrainians of Romania
