= Moldovans in Ukraine =

Ethnic group in Ukraine

Moldovan Ukrainians

Total population
- 258,619 (2001 Ukrainian census)

Regions with significant populations
- Odesa Oblast, Chernivtsi Oblast

Languages
- predominantly Romanian (71.1%) also Russian (17.6%) and Ukrainian 10.7%

Religion
- Eastern Orthodox

Moldovans in Ukraine (Romanian: Moldoveni în Ucraina) are the third biggest minority recorded in the 2001 All Ukrainian Census after Russians and Belarusians. Unlike many other minorities, Moldovans often live in the countryside (71.5%) rather than in a city (28.5%), the majority in the northern and southern historical region of Bessarabia. There is an undergoing identity controversy among the Romanian speakers of Ukraine over whether self-identified Moldovans are a part of the larger Romanian ethnic group or a separate ethnic group.

== History ==
After 1812, Russian Empire annexed Bessarabia from Moldavia. Initially, Romanians under Russian rule enjoyed privileges well, the language of Moldavians was established as an official language in the governmental institutions of Bessarabia, used along with Russian, as more than 90% of the population was Romanian. The publishing works established by Archbishop Gavril Bănulescu-Bodoni were able to produce books and liturgical works in Moldavian dialect of Romanian between 1815 and 1820, used both in Principality of Moldova and in Bessarabia.

From 1829 to 1905, the Russification policies were implemented and all public use of Romanian was phased out, being substituted with Russian. Romanian continued to be used as the colloquial language of home and family, mostly spoken by Romanians, either first or second language. Many Romanians changed Russified family names. This was the era of the highest level of assimilation in the Russian Empire.

In 1918, after being military occupied by Romanian troops, Bessarabia united with the Kingdom of Romania. In 1940, Bessarabia was annexed by the Soviet Union. Around 65% of Bessarabia is part of the modern-day Moldova, with the Ukrainian Budjak region (part of the Odesa Oblast) covering the southern coastal region, and part of the Ukrainian Chernivtsi Oblast (Romanian: Cernăuți) covering an area in the north.

The late Israeli scholar, mainly a Holocaust specialist, Dov Levin has made available statistics that showed that there were no representatives in the organs of Soviet power, etc., in Hertsa and the Bukovinian raions of the Chernivtsi region with a Moldovan identity in 1940-1941, but only with a Romanian one; the birth and death statistics and those on the number of students during the same period show the same thing. On October 11, 1942, the (Soviet) State Committee on Defense decided to extend the decrees on "the mobilization of the NKVD labour columns, German men, able to work, 17-50 years old - to the persons of other nations, being in war with USSR-Romanians, Hungarians, Italians, Finns."; the order was signed by Stalin. As a result, in May 1944, in the village of Molodiia and some other northern Bukovinian localities, those men who declared a "Moldovan" nationality were incorporated into the Soviet army, while those who declared a "Romanian" nationality were sent to the work camps in the area of Lake Onega, where most of them died. The Soviet era dominance of the "Moldovan" identity in parts of northern Bukovina was due to the fact that the inhabitants of the Chernivtsi and Sadagura rural raions, and of the Bukovinian part of the Novoselytsia raion, were pressured in 1944 to adopt a "Moldovan" national/ethnic identity.

There were allegations from Romanian ethnic organizations and activists in Ukraine such as the teacher Zinaida Pinteac that in the 2001 Ukrainian census, individuals, especially, but not exclusively, in the Odessa region were pressured to declare a Moldovan rather than Romanian ethnic and/or linguistic identity. According to a major book on the Romanian minority in Ukraine, this phenomenon does not seem to have very widespread. According to Kateryna Sheshtakova, a professor at the Pomeranian University of Slutsk in Poland who did field research among the 15 self-identified Romanians and self-identified Moldovans in the Chernivtsi region of Ukraine, 'Some Moldovans use both names of the mother tongue (Moldovan or Romanian) and accordingly declare two ethnic affiliations.' She recorded one statement that "I am Moldovan, but to be more precise, we should say I am Romanian". She also recorded one subject who believed the language had been transformed from Moldovan to Romanian: "That language, is it Romanian or Moldovan? R: Now, it's Romanian. There is no Moldovan now. Then, it used to be Moldovan, but written with Russian letters. And now everything is in Latin". Shestakova suggests that those self-identified Moldovans who see differences between Moldovan and Romanian tend to be from "the older generation". Opinion polling from the Chernivtsi oblast, as well as the discussions of the delegates of the Meeting of the Leaders of the Romanophone Organizations from Ukraine of December 6, 1996, indicated that many of the self-identified Moldovans believed that the Moldovan and Romanian languages were identical. By comparison, in the Republic of Moldova, “more than half of the self-proclaimed Moldovans (53.5%) said that they saw no difference” between the Romanian and Moldovan languages according to a survey conducted by Pal Kolsto and Hans Olav Melberg in 1998 which also included the Transnistrian separatist region. According to Alla Skvortsova, an ethnic Russian researcher from the Republic of Moldova, "Our survey found that while 94.4 percent of the Romanians living in Moldova consider Moldovan and Romanian to be the same language, only half of the Moldovans (53.2 percent) share this view". In the Chernivtsi Oblast of post-Soviet Ukraine, both the self-identified Romanians and the self-identified Moldovans have always been educated in Romanian-language languages; there were no Moldovan language schools because there was no demand for them.

Despite repeated requests from Romania to recognize the Moldovan and Romanian language as the same, between 1998 and 2023, independent Ukraine continued to use Moldovan language schoolbooks in the Odesa Oblast, though never in the Chernivtsi Oblast or even in the Odesa Oblast in the early and mid-1990's, when the language of the textbooks was called Romanian. Opinion polling from the Chernivtsi Oblast indicated that a significant majority of the self-identified Moldovans thought that there was no difference between the Romanian and Moldovan languages. The high school of Borysivka changed the name of the language used for teaching from "Moldovan" to "Romanian" and adopted the Romanian schools' curriculum in Ukraine on May 25, 2023, through a decision of the teaching staff. On 16 November, the Ministry of Education and Science and the Ukrainian government stated that it has initiated steps to replace the term "Moldovan language" with "Romanian language". On 13 January 2024, the Ukrainian newspaper Dumska indicated that the last three schools had just changed the name of the language from "Moldovan" to "Romanian" .

On 26 June 2026, Andrii Sybiha, Ukraine's Minister of Foreign Affairs, announced that Moldova had been included in Ukraine's list of countries from which it accepted dual citizenship. Romania had already been included on 8 May that year.

== Demographics ==
The number of Moldovans was 258,619 in 2001, out of which 181,124 declared Moldovan (70.04%), and 2,790 declared Romanian (1.08%), as their native language. (the 2001 Ukrainian Census). The largest number of people who identified themselves as Moldovans, 123,751, lived in the Odesa oblast, while 67,225 lived in the Chernivtsi oblast. The people identifying themselves as Moldovans were a majority in Novoselytsia Raion (Chernivtsi Oblast) and more than 49% in Reni Raion (Odesa Oblast) before the 2020 administrative reform of Ukraine. The number of Romanians, according to the same 2001 Census, was 150,989, including 114,555 in the Chernivtsi oblast and 724 in the Odesa oblast. In 2001, among the 67,225 inhabitants with a "Moldovan" ethnic identity, 2,657 people declared that their native language is "Romanian" (3.95%), and among the 5,627 self-identified "Moldovans" whose native language was not "Moldovan", 1,672 declared that they knew "Romanian" (2.49% of all "Moldovans").

In 1989, in the Chernivtsi oblast of Soviet Ukraine, there were 53,211 self-identified ethnic Romanians who declared their native language to be Romanian, and 32,412 who declared it to be Moldovan. There were also 80,637 Moldovans who declared their language as Moldovan, and 1 who declared it as Romanian in the same oblast. In 2001, in the Chernivtsi oblast of independent Ukraine, there were 105,296 self-identified ethnic Romanians who declared their native language to be Romanian, and 467 who declared it to be Moldovan. There were also 61,598 Moldovans who declared their language as Moldovan, and 2,657 who declared it as Romanian in the same oblast. Therefore, the number of self-identified ethnic Romanians who declared their language to be Romanian increased by 97.88% between 1989 and 2001. By contrast, the number of ethnic Moldovans who declared their language to be Moldovan decreased by 23.31%. Among those who declared their ethnicity as Romanian or Moldovan, there was an increase in the number of people calling their language as Romanian from 53,212 to 107,953, an increase of 102.87%. By contrast, there was decrease in the number of such people who declared their language as Moldovan from 113,049 to 62,065, a decrease of 45.1%.

In Novoselytsia Raion of the Chernivtsi oblast, there were 87,461 inhabitants, of which 50,329 identified as Moldovans, or 57.54% (out of which 47,585 self-identified their language as Moldovan, or 54.45% of the raion's population, and 2,264 as Romanian or 2.6%), 29,703 Ukrainians (35.05%), 5,904 Romanians (6.77%), 1,235 Russians (1.42%), and 290 others (0.29%). The raion had 87,241 inhabitants in 2001, including 34.08% Ukrainian-speakers, 64% Romanian-speakers, and 1.78% Russian-speakers. In 2001, in the capital of the raion at that time, the town of Novoselytsia, the population mostly identified itself as 54.37% ethnically Ukrainian, 35.82% as Moldovan, 1.63% as Romanian, and 6.84% as Russian. The distribution of the population by native language was Ukrainian 54.9%, Romanian 34.5%%, and Russian 10.1%. In 2001, this was Ukraine's only raion in which an absolute majority of the population was recorded by the census as having a Moldovan identity.

The Reni Raion of the Odesa Oblast, in its boundaries at that time, including the city of Reni, Ukraine, had 40,680 inhabitants in 2001, including 19,938 self-identified Moldovans (49.01%), 7,196 ethnic Ukrainians (17.69%), 6,136 ethnic Russians (15.08%), 3,439 Bulgarians (8.45%), 736 Gagauz (1.81%) and 36 self-identified Romanians (0.09%). The inhabitants of the Reni raion were 37.88% Russian-speaking, 40.9% Romanian-speaking, 7.26% Ukrainian-speaking, 6.76% Gagauz-speaking and 6.61% Bulgarian-speaking. The city of Reni, Ukraine, the capital of the Reni raion, had 20,761 inhabitants in 2001, including 6,694 ethnic Ukrainians (32.24%), 6,126 self-identified Moldovans (29.5%), 5,589 ethnic Russians (26.92%), 1,012 Bulgarians (4.87%), 736 Gagauz (1.81%) and 22 self-identified Romanians (0.11%). In 2001, the city of Reni was 70.54% Russian-speaking, 13.37% Romanian-speaking, 12.5% Ukrainian-speaking, 1.52% Gagauz-speaking, and 1.35% Bulgarian-speaking. In the 2001 Ukrainian Census, Izmail Raion of the Odesa Oblast, within its boundaries in 2001, had a multi-ethnic population of 54,692, including 15,798 ethnic Ukrainians (28.89%), 15,083 self-identified Moldovans (27.58%), 14,072 Bulgarians (25.73%), 8,870 ethnic Russians (16.22%), 230 Gagauz (0.42%) and 34 self-identified Romanians (0.06%). Izmail Raion, within its boundaries at that time, had 54,692 inhabitants in 2001, including 26.34% Ukrainian-speakers, 26.21% Romanian-speakers, 21.56% Russian-speakers, 24.88% Bulgarian-speaking and 0.26% Gagauz-speaking. The city of Izmail, which is also the same as the Izmail urban hromada, had 85,098 inhabitants in 2001, including 32,500 who identified themselves as ethnic Ukrainians (38.2%), 37,166 as ethnic Russians (43.67%), 8,609 as Bulgarians (10.1%), 3,670 as Moldovans (4.31%), 788 as Gagauz (0.01%) and 31 as Romanians (0.04%). The city of Izmail had 85,098 inhabitants in 2001, including 15,353 Ukrainian-speakers (18.04%), 1,538 Romanian-speakers (1.81%), 3,898 Bulgarian-speakers (4.58%), 63,180 Russian-speakers (74.24%), and 327 Gagauz-speakers (0.38%). Kiliia Raion of the Odesa oblast, within its boundaries at that time, had in 2001 59,837 inhabitants, of which 26,659 ethnic Ukrainians (44.55%), 17,977 ethnic Russians (30.04%), 9,442 self-identified Moldovans (15.78%), 2,559 Bulgarians (4.28%), 2,263 ethnic Gagauz (3.78%) and 54 self-identified Romanians (0.09%). Kiliia raion, within its boundaries at that time, had 59,837 inhabitants in 2001, including 36.09% Ukrainian-speakers, 12.81% Romanian-speakers, 44.23% Russian-speakers, 2.52% Bulgarian-speaking and 3.69% Gagauz-speaking.

Various ethnic Romanian authors have argued that many individuals have changed their ethnic identity from Moldovan (or predominantly Moldovan) to Romanian (or predominantly Romanian). In the last Soviet census of 1989, out of 940,801 inhabitants of the Chernivtsi oblast, 666,095 declared themselves Ukrainians (70.8%), 100,317 Romanians (10.66%), 84,519 Moldovans (8.98%), and 63,066 Russians (6.7%). The decline in the number (from 84,519 to 67,225) and proportion of self-identified Moldovans (from 8.98% to 7.31%) was explained by them as a switch from a census Moldovan to a census Romanian ethnic identity, and has continued after the 2001 census. By contrast, the number of self-identified ethnic Romanians has increased (from 100,317 to 114,555), and so has their proportion of the population of the oblast (from 10.66% to 12.46%), and the process has continued after the 2001 census. The eighteen villages in the Hlyboka Raion, the Novoselytsia Raion and the Hertsa Raion of historical Bukovina and the Hertsa area in 1989 with a significant Romanian-speaking populations, most of which declared a Moldovan ethnic identity in 1989, had 15,412 individuals who overwhelmingly declared their language to be Romanian in 2001 (55.91% of the local Romanian-speakers), and 12,156 who called it Moldovan in the same year (44.09% of the local Romanian-speakers).

Some authors have argued that most of the inhabitants of the former Hertsa Raion of the Chernivtsi Oblast who had self-identified themselves as Moldovans in 1989 self-identified themselves as Romanians in 2001. In 2001, the population of Hertsa Raion of the Chernivtsi Oblast was 32,316, of which 29,554 or 91.45% identified themselves as Romanians, 1,616 or 5.0% as Ukrainians, and 756 or 2.34% as Moldovans (out of which 511 self-identified their language as Moldovan and 237 as Romanian), 0.9% as Russians, and 0.3% as being of other ethnicities (see: Ukrainian Census, 2001). In the last Soviet census of 1989, out of 29,611 inhabitants, 1,569 declared themselves Ukrainians (5.30%), 23,539 Romanians (79.49%), 3,978 Moldovans (13.43%), and 431 Russians (1.46%). The decline in the number (from 3,978 to 756) and proportion of Moldovans (from 13.43% to 2.34%) was explained by a switch from a census Moldovan to a census Romanian ethnic identity, and has continued after the 2001 census. By contrast, the number of self-identified ethnic Romanians has increased (from 23,539 to 29,554), and so has their proportion of the population of the former raion (from 79.49% to 91.45%), and the process has continued after the 2001 census. For example, in the village of Ostrytsia in the Hertsa Raion, in 2001, 93.73% of the inhabitants spoke Romanian as their native language (93.22% self-declared Romanian and 0.52% self-declared Moldovan), while 4.96% spoke Ukrainian. In the Soviet census of 1989, the number of inhabitants of the locality who declared themselves Romanians plus Moldovans was 2,965 (324, or 10.05% Romanians plus 2,641 or 81.92% Moldovans) out of 3,224, representing 91.97% of the locality's population, and there were 205 ethnic Ukrainians (6.36%). Similar patterns could be observed in other villages, such as Tsuren in the former Hertsa Raion, Boyany in the former Novoselytsia Raion, Voloka in the former Hlyboka Raion, etc. Most of the inhabitants of the former Hlyboka Raion who had self-identified themselves as Moldovans in 1989 self-identified themselves as Romanians in 2001.

Some authors have argued that most of the inhabitants of the former Hlyboka Raion who had self-identified themselves as Moldovans in 1989 self-identified themselves as Romanians in 2001. According to the Ukraine Census (2001), the 72,676 residents of the Hlyboka Raion reported themselves as following: Ukrainians: 34,025 (46.82%), Romanians: 32,923 (45.3%), Moldovans: 4,425 (6.09%), Russians: 877 (1.21%), and other: 426 (0.59%). Hlyboka raion, within its boundaries at that time, had 72,676 inhabitants in 2001, including 52.56% Ukrainian-speakers, 45.97% Romanian-speakers, and 1.15% Russian-speakers. In 1989, in the last Soviet census of 1989, out of 68,009 inhabitants, 27,407 declared themselves Ukrainians (40.3%), 29,042 Romanians (42.7%), 9,644 Moldovans (14.18%), and 1,363 Russians (2%). The decline in the number (from 9,644 to 4,425) and proportion of self-identified Moldovans (from 14.18% to 6.09%) was explained by a sw itch from a census Moldovan to a census Romanian ethnic identity, and has continued after the 2001 census. By contrast, the number of self-identified ethnic Romanians has increased (from 29,042 to 32,923), and so has their proportion of the population of the former raion (from 42.7% to 45.3%), and the process has continued after the 2001 census. On the basis of the 1989 and 2001 census data, included those listed above, some authors have stated and argued that most of the inhabitants of historical northern Bukovina and of the Hertsa area who had been counted as Moldovan and Moldovan-speakers during the Soviet period indicated a Romanian ethnic and linguistic identity in 2001. Among the several localities in which a majority of the Romanian plus Moldovan population changed its ethnic and linguistic identity from Moldovan to Romanian between the two censuses were Voloka and Valia Kuzmyna (see the details in the articles on the villages).

Some authors have argued that many of the inhabitants of the former Novoselytsia Raion in the smaller, former Bukovinian area of the raion, who had self-identified themselves as Moldovans in 1989 self-identified themselves as Romanians in 2001. This was the case in a number of localities such as Boiany. In 2001, 92.16% of the population of 4,425 inhabitants of Boyany spoke Romanian as their native language, 4,078 people (including 2,810 who declared it as Romanian or 63.50%, and 1,268 as Moldovan, or 28.66%), with a minority of Ukrainian speakers (6.33%). According to the 1989 Soviet census, the number of inhabitants who declared themselves Romanian plus Moldovan was 3,764 (40 Romanians, or 0.94% plus 3,724 Moldovans, or 87.64%), representing 88.59% of the population of 4,249 inhabitants. A similar pattern could be found, for example, in the village of Ostrytsia of the Mahala urban hromada; see the article on the village of Mahala, Chernivtsi Oblast. However, in a number of other localities, such as the village of Mahala, only a large minority of the Romanian-speaking population did so by 2001. From 1991 to 2020, the village of Mahala was a part of the Noua Suliță/Novoselytsia Raion of the Chernivtsi region of independent Ukraine. According to the 1989 census, the number of inhabitants of Mahala who declared themselves Romanians plus Moldovans was 2,231 (16 + 2,215), representing 90.40% of the population. In 2001, 92.52% of the inhabitants spoke Romanian (59.91% self-identified Moldovan and 32.60% self-identified Romanian) as their native language, with Ukrainian (5.96%) and Russian (1.45%) speakers in the minority. In the formerly Bukovinian villages in the Boiany rural hromada and the Mahala rural hromada, where the inhabitants overwhelmingly declared their ethnic identity as Moldovan in 1989, there were 18,331 inhabitants in 2001, including 7,589 (41.4%) who declared their native language as Moldovan, 5,690 (31.04%) who declared it to be Romanian, 4,815 (26.27%) who declared it Ukrainian, and 198 (1.08%) who declared it be Russian. The self-declared Romanian speakers were thus 42.85% of the Romanian-speaking population of this Bukovinian area, while 57.15% called their language Moldovan.

According to a survey conducted by the International Republican Institute in April–May 2023, 82% of the city's population spoke Ukrainian at home, 15% spoke Russian, and 2% spoke Romanian. This reflects the increasing proportion of Ukrainian-speakers in the city, from 79.2% in 2001 to 82% in 2023, while the proportion of Russian-speakers stayed stationary at 15%, and the percentage of Romanian-speakers decreased from 4.34% in 2001 to around 2% in 2023. Most of the self-identified ethnic Romanians (4.36% of the population in 2001) and Moldovans (1.36% of the population in 2001) seemed to be Ukrainian-speakers by 2023.

Most of the Bessarabian part of the former raion is made up of the Novoselytsia urban hromada and the Vanchykivtsi rural hromada, which had 48,642 inhabitants in 2001; out of these, 29,875 (61.42%) declared themselves as Moldovan-speakers, 15,431 as Ukrainian-speakers (31.72%), 2,114 as Romanian-speakers (4.35%) and 1,148 (2.36%) as Russian-speakers. The self-declared Romanian speakers were thus 6.61% of the Romanian-speaking population of the area. In a minority of the localities in the Bessarabian part of the Novoselytsia Raion of the Chernivtsi Oblast, there was an increase from less than 1% self-identified ethnic Romanians, and an even lower percentage who stated that their language was Romanian (see the data for the entire raion below) in 1989 to 26-29% self-identified Romanian-speakers (as distinct from self-identified Moldovan-speakers) in 2001, and a smaller increase in the proportion of self-identified Romanians. These include Cherlenivka and Dynivtsi. This parallels similar developments in the Republic of Moldova, where the number of self-identified ethnic Romanians as measured by the censuses increased from 2.477 (0.1%) in 1989 to 192,800 in 2014 (7%), though the situation in Moldova doesn't necessarily apply to Ukraine, or at least in the same way. In the Novoselytsia Raion as a whole, the number of individuals who declared that their native language was Romanian increased from 315 (out of 585 individuals who declared a Romanian ethnicity and only 0.36% of the raion's population) in 1989 to 8,076 (9.23%) self-declared Romanians (5,812 people) plus Moldovans (2,264 people) and 8,131 (9.3%) such inhabitants overall in 2001. In the Novoselytsia Raion as a whole, the number of individuals who declared that their ethnicity was Romanian increased from 585 individuals (0.67%) in 1989 to 5,904 (6.75%) individuals in 2001. By contrast, in the Novoselytsia Raion as a whole, the number of individuals who declared that their ethnicity was Moldovan decreased from 50,669 individuals (64.16%%) in 1989 to 50,329 (57.54%) self-declared Moldovans in 2001. In the Novoselytsia Raion, the number of individuals who declared that their native language was Moldovan decreased from 55,121 self-identified Moldovans (64.16%) and 168 Romanians (0.19%) and 55,289 (63.72%) overall in 1989, to 47,585 self-identified Moldovans (54.41%), 57 self-identified Romanians (0.07%) and 199 people of other self-declared ethnicities (0.23%), and 47,841 people overall (54.7%) in 2001 who declared their native language to be Moldovan. It has been noted that among the self-declared Romanian population in the raion, there are disproportionately more younger people than the self-declared Moldovan population, partly due to changing self-identifications from Moldovan to Romanian, and partly due to a higher birth rate in the predominantly Romanian self-identification villages.

== Notable people ==
- Constantin Popovici
- Ivan Bodiul - First Secretary of the Moldavian Communist Party
- Petro Bolbochan - colonel of the Ukrainian People's Army
- Sofia Rotaru
- Tatiana Gutsu - artistic gymnast
- Vasyl Tsushko
- Volodimir (Moroz) - Metropolitan of the Ukrainian Orthodox Church

== See also ==
- Moldova–Ukraine relations
- Ukrainians in Moldova
- Romanians in Ukraine
- Moldovan diaspora
- New Serbia
- Slavo-Serbia
- Budjak
- Northern Bessarabia
