= Koteleve =

Commune in Chernivtsi Oblast, Ukraine

Coordinates: 48°17′01″N 26°21′23″E

Koteleve (Ukrainian: Котелеве; Romanian: Coteleu) is a commune (selsoviet) in Chernivtsi Raion, Chernivtsi Oblast, Ukraine. It belongs to Novoselytsia urban hromada, one of the hromadas of Ukraine.

Until 18 July 2020, Koteleve belonged to Novoselytsia Raion. The raion was abolished in July 2020 as part of the administrative reform of Ukraine, which reduced the number of raions of Chernivtsi Oblast to three. The area of Novoselytsia Raion was split between Chernivtsi and Dniester Raions, with Koteleve being transferred to Chernivtsi Raion.

== Notable people ==
- Vasyl Vaskan (1941–2023), poet
