= Nesvoia =

Village in Chernivtsi Oblast, Ukraine

Nesvoia Несвоя Nesfoaia
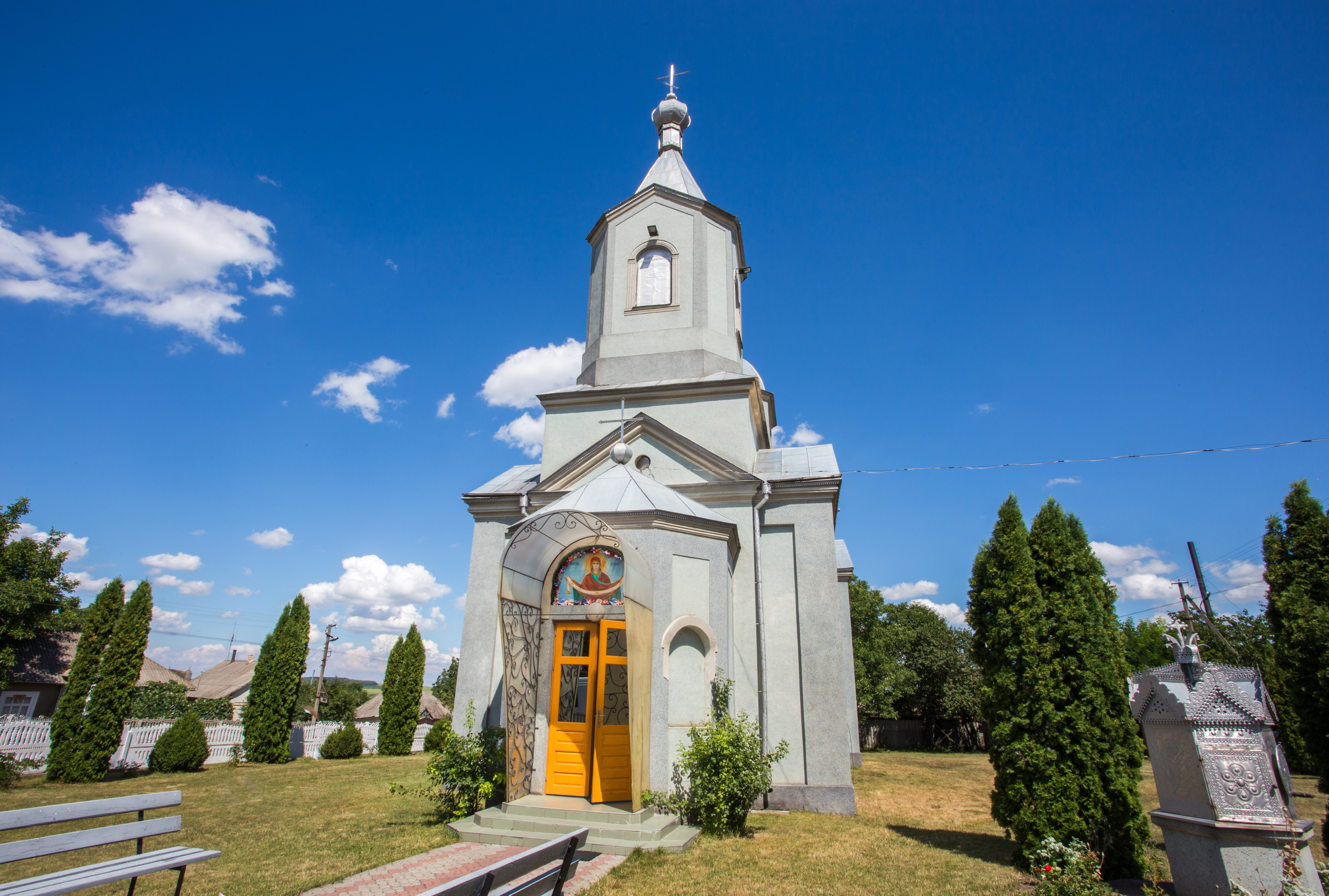
- The Church of the Intercession of the Most Holy Theotokos in the village of Nesvoia

- Location of Nesvoia in Ukraine Nesvoia (Ukraine)
- Coordinates: 48°20′7″N 26°34′27″E
- Country: Ukraine
- Oblast: Chernivtsi Oblast
- Raion: Dniester Raion
- Hromada: Mamalyha rural hromada
- Founded: 1516
- Elevation: 196 m (643 ft)

Population
  - Total: 1,330
- Time zone: UTC+2 (EET)
  - Summer (DST): UTC+3 (EEST)
- Postal code: 60361
- Area code: +380 3733
- KATOTTH: UA73040090060063445
- KOATUU (superseded): 7323085101

Nesvoia (Ukrainian: Несвоя; Romanian: Nesfoaia) is a village in Dniester Raion, Chernivtsi Oblast, Ukraine. It belongs to Mamalyha rural hromada, one of the hromadas of Ukraine. Until August 2015, it served as the administrative centre and sole constituent settlement of Nesvoia silrada.

Until 18 July 2020, Nesvoia belonged to Novoselytsia Raion. The raion was abolished in July 2020 as part of the administrative reform of Ukraine, which reduced the number of raions of Chernivtsi Oblast to three. The area of Novoselytsia Raion was split between Chernivtsi and Dniester Raions, with Nesvoia being transferred to Dniester Raion. In 2001, 95.12% of the inhabitants spoke Romanian as their native language, while 4.74% spoke Ukrainian.
