= Stalnivtsi =

Commune in Chernivtsi Oblast, Ukraine

Coordinates: 48°18′07″N 26°32′57″E

Stalnivtsi (Ukrainian: Стальнівці; Romanian: Stălinești) is a commune (selsoviet) in Dniester Raion, Chernivtsi Oblast, Ukraine. It belongs to Mamalyha rural hromada, one of the hromadas of Ukraine.

Until 18 July 2020, Stalnivtsi belonged to Novoselytsia Raion. The raion was abolished in July 2020 as part of the administrative reform of Ukraine, which reduced the number of raions of Chernivtsi Oblast to three. The area of Novoselytsia Raion was split between Chernivtsi and Dniester Raions, with Stalnivtsi being transferred to Dniester Raion. In 2001, 94.87% of the inhabitants spoke Romanian as their native language, while 4.37 % spoke Ukrainian.
