= Bălcăuți =

Bălcăuți may refer to:

- Bălcăuți, a commune in Suceava County, Romania
- Bălcăuți, a commune in Briceni district, Moldova
- Balkivtsi (Bălcăuți in Romanian), a village in Dniester Raion, Chernivtsi Oblast, Ukraine
