= Forosna =

Commune in Chernivtsi Oblast, Ukraine

Forosna Форосна Forosna
- Commune
- Interactive map of Forosna
- Coordinates: 48°19′06″N 26°26′14″E
- Country: Ukraine
- Oblast: Chernivtsi Oblast
- Raion: Chernivtsi Raion
- Hromada: Vanchykivtsi rural hromada

Forosna (Ukrainian: Форосна; Romanian: Forosna) is a commune (selsoviet) in Chernivtsi Raion, Chernivtsi Oblast, Ukraine. It belongs to Vanchykivtsi rural hromada, one of the hromadas of Ukraine.

Until 18 July 2020, Forosna belonged to Novoselytsia Raion. The raion was abolished in July 2020 as part of the administrative reform of Ukraine, which reduced the number of raions of Chernivtsi Oblast to three. The area of Novoselytsia Raion was split between Chernivtsi and Dniester Raions, with Forosna being transferred to Chernivtsi Raion. In 2001, 92.3% of the inhabitants spoke Romanian as their native language, while 7.19% spoke Ukrainian.
