= Șendreni (disambiguation) =

Șendreni may refer to:

- Șendreni, a commune in Galați County, Romania
- Șendreni, a village in Frumușica Commune, Botoșani County, Romania
- Șendreni, a village in Victoria Commune, Iaşi County, Romania
- Șendreni, a village in Vărzărești Commune, Nisporeni District, Moldova
- Șendreni, the Romanian name for Dranytsia Commune, Novoselytsia Raion, Ukraine
