= Rukshyn =

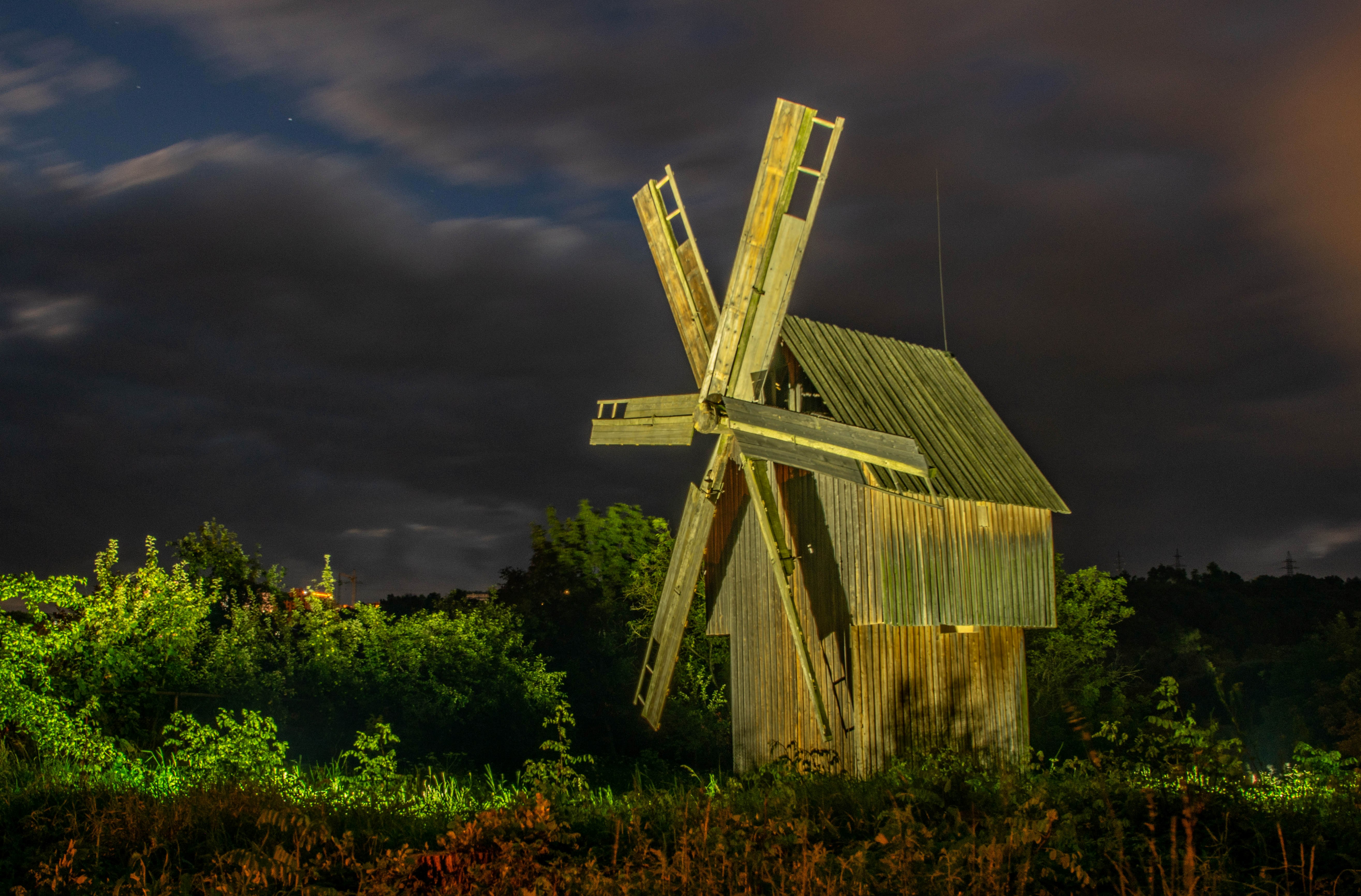

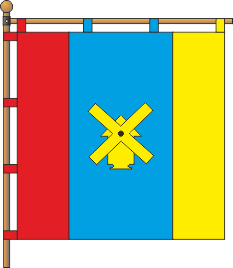
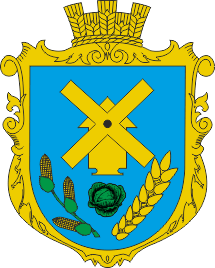
- Flag Coat of arms
- Interactive map of Rukshyn
- Coordinates: 48°29′15″N 26°24′21″E
- Country: Ukraine
- Oblast: Chernivtsi Oblast
- Raion: Dniester Raion
- Hromada: Rukshyn rural hromada
- First written mention: 1456
- Elevation: 185 m (607 ft)

Population
  - Total: 3,204
- Postal code: 60030

Rukshyn (Ukrainian: Рукшин; Romanian: Rucșin) is a village in Dniester Raion, Chernivtsi Oblast, Ukraine. It hosts the administration of Rukshyn rural hromada, one of the hromadas of Ukraine.

Until 18 July 2020, Rukshyn belonged to Khotyn Raion. The raion was abolished in July 2020 as part of the administrative reform of Ukraine, which reduced the number of raions of Chernivtsi Oblast to three. The area of Khotyn Raion was merged into Dniester Raion.
