= Boiany =

Commune in Chernivtsi Oblast, Ukraine

Boiany Бояни Boian
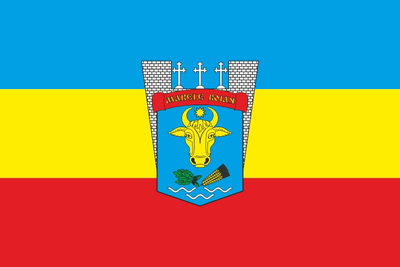
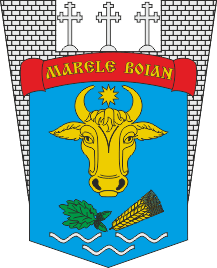
- Flag Coat of arms
- Interactive map of Boiany
- Boiany in Ukraine Boiany (Ukraine)
- Coordinates: 48°16′N 26°8′E
- Country: Ukraine
- Oblast: Chernivtsi Oblast
- Raion: Chernivtsi Raion
- Established: 8 April 1528

Government
  - Mayor: Ion Jalbă
- Elevation: 158 m (518 ft)

Population
  - Total: 4,425
- Time zone: UTC+2 (EET)
  - Summer (DST): UTC+3 (EEST)
- Postal code: 60321
- Area code: +380 3733

Boiany (Ukrainian: Бояни; Romanian: Boian; Yiddish: באיאן; German: Bojan) is a village in Chernivtsi Raion, Chernivtsi Oblast (province) of western Ukraine. It is located close to Sadagura in the historic region of Bukovina. It hosts the administration of Boiany rural hromada, one of the hromadas of Ukraine. The Boiany rural hromada includes Boiany village, Boianivka village, Hai village and Prypruttia village.

It was the ancestral estate of Ion Neculce, chronicler of the history of the Principality of Moldavia in the 18th century.

== History ==
=== Moldavia ===
According to legend, the village was founded by a forester raising oxen (boi in Romanian) in a glade. In the Middle Ages, trade route linking Cernăuți (now Chernivtsi) with Iași passed through the village. The village is first officially attested in a document dated 8 April 1528 by Petru Rareș, ruler of Moldavia. The Boian estate is given as a wedding gift to Ion Neculce's mother, Catrina Cantacuzino, together with Cernauca and 21 other villages. Upon Neculce's flight and exile in Russia, the estate was confiscated and given to another nobleman, but in 1720 Neculce was granted permission to return to Moldavia. He then proceeded to sue the new owner and managed to convince the court to return the Boian estate to him.

=== Ukraine ===
Until 18 July 2020, Boiany belonged to Novoselytsia Raion. The raion was abolished in July 2020 as part of the administrative reform of Ukraine, which reduced the number of raions of Chernivtsi Oblast to three. The area of Novoselytsia Raion was split between Chernivtsi and Dniester Raions, with Boiany being transferred to Chernivtsi Raion.

== Demographics ==
In 2001, 92.16% of the population of 4,425 inhabitants of the village of Boiany spoke Romanian as their native language, 4,078 people (including 2,810 who declared it as Romanian or 63.50%, and 1,268 as "Moldovan", or 28.66%), with a minority of Ukrainian speakers (6.33%). According to the 1989 Soviet census, the number of inhabitants who declared themselves Romanian plus Moldovan was 3,764 (40 Romanians, or 0.94% plus 3,724 Moldovans, or 87.64%), representing 88.59% of the population of 4,249 inhabitants. A large majority of the population switched their declared census identities from Moldovan and Moldovan-speaking to Romanian and Romanian-speaking between the 1989 and 2001 censuses, and the process has continued ever since. The Soviet era dominance of the "Moldovan" identity in the village and other localities discussed in this article, reversed between 1989 and 2001, was due to the fact that the inhabitants of the Chernivtsi and Sadagura rural raions, of the Bukovinian part of the Novoselytsia rural raion, were pressured in 1944 to adopt a "Moldovan" national/ethnic identity.

According to the 2001 Ukrainian census, the majority of the population of the village Hai (which had 351 inhabitants) in the Boyany rural hromada (rural community) was Romanian-speaking (98.29%, or 345 people, including 69.23% who called their language "Moldovan", or 243 people, and 29.06% who call their language Romanian, or 102 people), and there were also Ukrainian speakers (1.71%, or 6 people) and no Russian-speakers. In 1989, out of 295 people in the village, 239 were Moldovans (81.02%), 25 were Romanians (8.47%), 31 were Ukrainians (10.51%) and none were Russians. A significant proportion of the population switched their declared census identities from Moldovan and Moldovan-speaking to Romanian and Romanian-speaking between the 1989 and 2001 censuses, and the process has continued ever since.

In 2001, 96.60% of the 2,206 inhabitants of the village of Prypruttia (2,131 people) spoke Romanian as their native language (including 96.33% who called it Moldovan, or 2,125 people, and 0.27% who called it Romanian, or 6 people), while a minority spoke Ukrainian (2.13%, o.r 47 people) and Russian (1.22%, or 27 people). According to the 2001 Ukrainian census, the majority of the population of the village of Boyanivka (which had 403 inhabitants) in the Boyany rural hromada (rural community) was Romanian-speaking (94.04%, or 379 people, including 361 people, or 89.58% who called their language "Moldovan", and 18 people, or 4.47%, who were calling the language Romanian.), and there were also 15 Ukrainian speakers (3.72%, or 6 people) and 9 Russian-speakers (2.23%).

In 2001, in the Boyany rural hromada (rural community) created in 2020, with a population of 7,385, 348 of the inhabitants (4.71%) spoke Ukrainian as their native language, while 6,933 (93.88%) spoke Romanian (including 3,997 who called it "Moldovan", or 54.12%, and 2,936 who called it Romanian, or 39.76%), and 77 (1.04%) spoke Russian. The Boyany rural hromada includes Boyany village, Boyanivka village, Hai village and Prypruttya village.

=== Jewish community ===
Home of the first Boyaner Rebbe in Boiany.

The Hasidic dynasty of Boyan was founded here in 1887 by Rabbi Yitzchok Friedman (1850–1917), eldest son of the first Sadigura Rebbe, Rabbi Avrohom Yaakov Friedman (1820–1883). Upon the death of his father in 1883, Rabbi Yitzchok and his brother Rabbi Yisrael (1852–1907) assumed joint leadership of their father's Hasidim. Although they were content with this arrangement, many of the Sadigura Hasidim preferred to have one Rebbe, and in 1887, the brothers agreed to draw lots to determine who would stay in Sadigura and who would leave. The lots fell to Rabbi Yisrael to remain as the second Sadigura Rebbe, while Rabbi Yitzchok moved to the neighboring town of Boiany (Boyan) and established his court there, becoming the first Boyaner Rebbe. Under his leadership, Boyaner Hasidut flourished. Boyaner communities were established in nearby towns as well as in Tiberias, Safed, and Jerusalem, Israel.

At the beginning of World War I, the town of Boyan was completely destroyed and the Rebbe and his family escaped to Vienna, where the Rebbe died in 1917. After the war ended, his four sons each moved to a different country to establish their court. Boyaner Hasidut continues today under the leadership of Rabbi Nachum Dov Brayer, great-grandson of the first Boyaner Rebbe, who lives in Jerusalem.

== Monuments ==
The village has a bust of Ion Neculce and a monument to the victims of Communist oppression.

== Emigration ==
Due to poor economic conditions, some villagers started immigrating to Canada in the late 1880s; by 1913, at least 983 people had left the village. Many of them settled in the province of Alberta and founded a village with the same name, Boian.

== Notable people ==
- Wilhelm Stekel (1868–1940), physician and psychologist
