= Prypruttia =

Village in Chernivtsi Oblast, Ukraine

Coordinates: 48.2558°N 26.1667°E

Prypruttia (Ukrainian: Припруття; Romanian: Lehăceni-Boian; German: Bojan-Lehuczeny) is a village in Chernivtsi Raion, Chernivtsi Oblast, Ukraine. It belongs to Boiany rural hromada, one of the hromadas of Ukraine. It was historically a part of Bukovina.

Until 18 July 2020, Prypruttia belonged to Novoselytsia Raion. The raion was abolished in July 2020 as part of the administrative reform of Ukraine, which reduced the number of raions of Chernivtsi Oblast to three. The area of Novoselytsia Raion was split between Chernivtsi and Dniester Raions, with Prypruttia being transferred to Chernivtsi Raion. In 2001, 96.60% of the 2,206 inhabitants of the village of Prypruttia (2,131 people) spoke Romanian as their native language (including 96.33% who called it "Moldovan", or 2,125 people, and 0.27% who called it Romanian, or 6 people), while a minority spoke Ukrainian (2.13%, o.r 47 people) and Russian (1.22%, or 27 people). In 1989, the village had 2,133 people, including 2,020 Moldovans (94.7%), 13 Romanians (0.61%), 37 Ukrainians (3.14%) and 19 Russians (0.89%).
