= Alexandrina Cernov =

Ukrainian Romanian academic, literary historian and philologist (1943–2024)

- Born: 24 November 1943; Hotin, Romania
- Died: 5 June 2024 (aged 80); Putna, Romania
- Burial place: Putna Monastery
- Occupations: Academic, lecturer, literary historian, philologist
- Awards: Several, including the National Order of Faithful Service

Academic background
- Education: University of Bucharest; Chernivtsi University
- Thesis: Lingvostilistica comparată (româno-rusă) a limbajului poetic (1989)

Academic work
- Main interests: Romanians in Ukraine, Romanian language and literature, comparative literature

Alexandrina Cernov (24 November 1943 – 5 June 2024; Ukrainian: Александріна Чернова, romanized: Aleksandrina Chernova) was a Ukrainian academic, literary historian and philologist of Romanian ethnicity. An honorary member of the Romanian Academy, she was lecturer at the Chernivtsi University. Cernov was a relevant figure of the Romanian minority of Ukraine and an advocate for their minority rights. She apported significant contributions to Romanian cultural life in Ukraine and published studies regarding the Romanians in Ukraine as well as handbooks for use in their schools.

== Biography ==
Alexandrina Cernov was born on 24 November 1943 in Hotin, Romania (now Khotyn, Ukraine). She studied at the Jean Monnet High School (then known as the High School No. 32) in Bucharest in Romania and later graduated from the University of Bucharest in 1961. From 1962 to 1966, she studied at the Faculty of Philology at the Chernivtsi University, being from 1971 to 2002 lecturer at the Department of Romanian and Classical Philology of the university. In 1989, she presented her PhD thesis Lingvostilistica comparată (româno-rusă) a limbajului poetic ("Comparative (Romanian–Russian) linguo-stylistics of the poetic language") in Chișinău, in the Moldavian SSR of the Soviet Union (now Moldova).

Cernov was a founding member of the Mihai Eminescu Society for Romanian Culture in Chernivtsi (Cernăuți), which was the first Romanian cultural society authorised to exist within the Soviet Union. She was the organization's vice president in 1989 and its president from 1990 to 1994. In 1992, she became an honorary member of the Romanian Academy. Since 1994, she was the editor-in-chief of the quarterly history and culture journal Glasul Bucovinei ("The Voice of Bukovina"). She had been a founding member and director since 1995 of the publishing house Editura Alexandru cel Bun in Chernivtsi. In 1998, she was part of the staff of the Romanian Cultural Foundation.

Cernov worked in the redaction of Romanian-language broadcasts for television broadcasts in Chernivtsi and at Radio Ukraine International. She was a relevant figure of the Romanian minority in Ukraine and an advocate for their minority rights. She criticized Ukraine's 2019 law "On protecting the functioning of the Ukrainian language as the state language" regarding the extent of the use of the Ukrainian language in the country, stating that it would affect the Romanians in Ukraine "very seriously". As of 2022, Cernov lived in Chernivtsi.

Cernov died on 5 June 2024 in the Putna Monastery in Putna, Romania. Her funeral took place on 7 June in the monastery, and she was buried in its cemetery. The funeral was attended by various relevant Romanian academic, diplomatic and ecclesiastical figures.

== Work ==
Cernov published articles and studies in the fields of comparative poetry, linguo-stylistics and translation theory. She was also the author of several Romanian language and literature handbooks for use in schools of Ukraine's Romanian minority. Her academic interests included the history and culture of the region of Bukovina, the situation of the Romanians in Northern Bukovina, the status and stylistics of the Romanian language, the history of Romanian literature, sociology and comparative poetry.

Cernov published the following books:

- Gramatica comparativă româno-rusă. Fonetică și lexicologie. Yuriy Fedkovych Chernivtsi National University. 1975.
- Cernăuți, 1408 – 2008. Romanian Cultural Institute. 2008.
- Drama românilor din regiunea Cernăuți: masacre, deportări, foamete în 1940-1941, 1944-1947. Editura Nicodim Caligraful. 2019.
- Destinul bisericii românești din nordul Bucovinei în perioada sovietică: credință, limbă, identitate. Editura Nicodim Caligraful. 2020.

She also published the following school handbooks:

- Pagini alese din literatura română și universală. Chernivtsi: Editura Alexandru cel Bun. 2008.
- Literatura română și universală, manual pentru clasa a VIII-a. Lviv: Svit All-Ukrainian Specialized Publishing House. 2008.
- Literatura română și universală, manual pentru clasa a IX-a. Lviv: Svit All-Ukrainian Specialized Publishing House. 2009.

== Honours and awards ==
Cernov received the Award of the Romanian Cultural Foundation (1994), the Commemorative Medal "150 years since the birth of Mihai Eminescu" (2000, given by the Ministry of Culture of Romania) and the National Order of Faithful Service in the ranks of "Officer" (2004) and "Commander".
