= Mamalyha =

Village in Chernivtsi Oblast, Ukraine

Mamalyha Мамалига Mămăliga
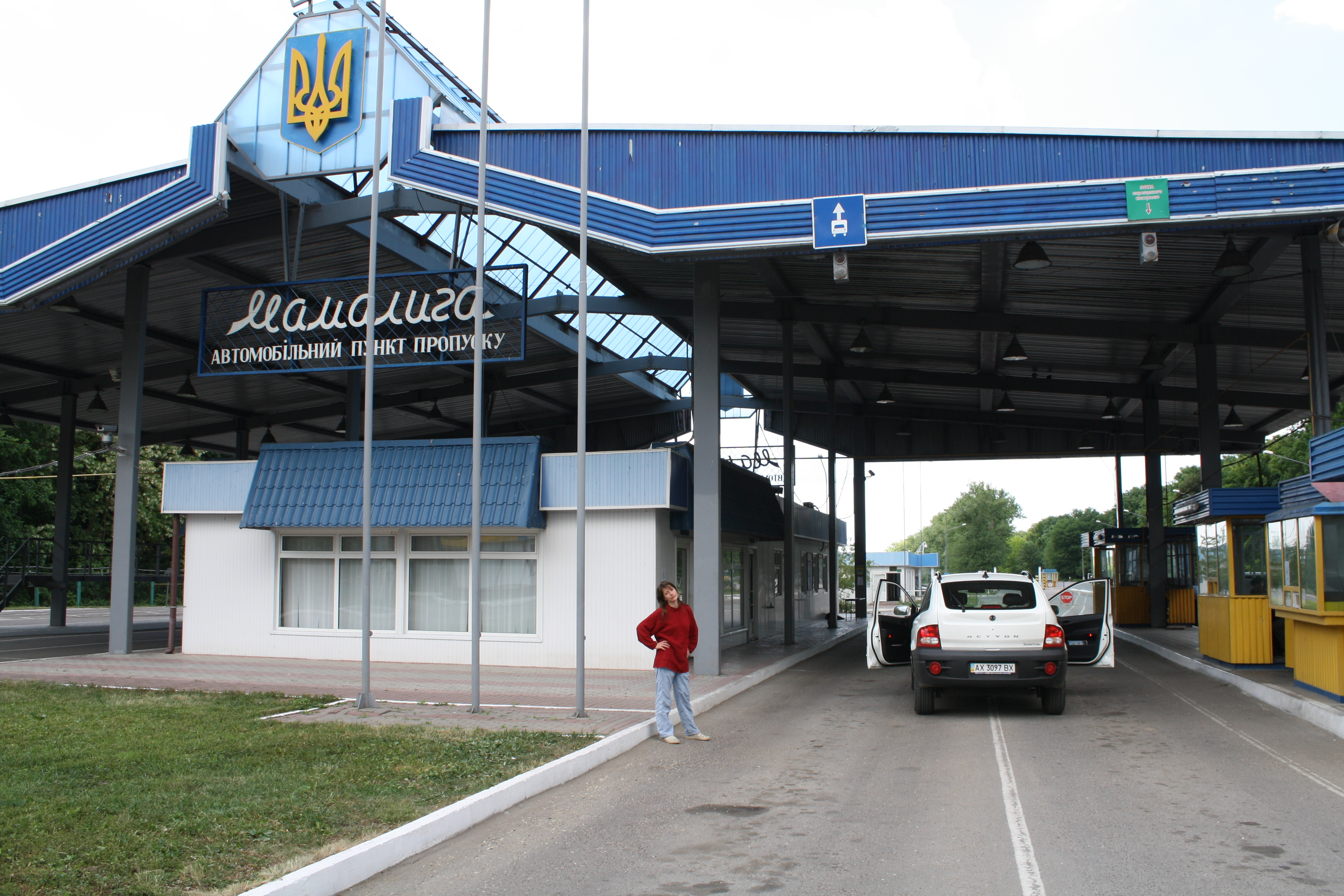
- Mamalyha (UKR) - Criva (MDA) Border Crossing
- Interactive map of Mamalyha
- Location of Mamalyha in Ukraine Mamalyha (Ukraine)
- Coordinates: 48°15′20″N 26°35′15″E
- Country: Ukraine
- Oblast: Chernivtsi Oblast
- Raion: Dniester Raion
- Elevation: 115 m (377 ft)

Population
  - Total: 2,589
- Time zone: UTC+2 (EET)
  - Summer (DST): UTC+3 (EEST)
- Postal code: 60364
- Area code: +380 3734
- KOATUU: 7323084301

Mamalyha (Ukrainian: Мамалига; Romanian: Mămăliga) is a village in Dniester Raion, Chernivtsi Oblast, Ukraine. It hosts the administration of Mamalyha rural hromada, one of the hromadas of Ukraine.

Until 18 July 2020, Mamalyha belonged to Novoselytsia Raion. The raion was abolished in July 2020 as part of the administrative reform of Ukraine, which reduced the number of raions of Chernivtsi Oblast to three. The area of Novoselytsia Raion was split between Chernivtsi Raion and Dniester Raions, with Mamalyha being transferred to Dniester Raion. In 2001, 88.14% of the inhabitants spoke Romanian as their native language, with Ukrainian (8.81%) and Russian (2.97%) speakers in the minority.

Mamalyha is a border crossing point to Criva, Moldova.
