= Romanian Orthodox Church in Ukraine =

The Romanian Orthodox Church in Ukraine (Romanian: Biserica Ortodoxă Română din Ucraina; Ukrainian: Румунська православна церква України) is a de jure religious structure of the Romanian Orthodox Church to function in Ukraine.

It was founded by the Holy Synod of the Romanian Orthodox Church on 29 February 2024, after several Romanian-language parishes in Ukraine, subordinated to the Ukrainian Orthodox Church (which was linked to the Moscow Patriarchate until 2022), requested affiliation with the Romanian Orthodox Church, in the context of the Russo-Ukrainian war. As of 2024, there were around 130 parishes in Ukraine where services were conducted in the Romanian language, concentrated especially in Chernivtsi Oblast.

The Ukrainian-born Romanian lawyer Eugen Patraș attempted to register the Romanian Orthodox Church in Ukraine, but the Ukrainian state blocked this initiative, and Patraș received a three-year ban from entering Ukraine. Subsequently, several priests stated to Radio Free Europe, under the condition of anonymity, that they had been threatened with forced conscription into the Ukrainian Armed Forces if they continued their efforts to affiliate with the Romanian Orthodox Church.

In a 2025 poll carried out by the Institute of Political Studies and Social Capital (IPSSC) and aimed for the Romanians in Ukraine, regarding the idea that churches in localities with Romanian populations in Ukraine should come under the jurisdiction of the Romanian Orthodox Church, 61.7% considered it a very good idea, 33.3% a good idea and 5% a bad idea. When asked why had the Ukrainian authorities not officially registered the Romanian Orthodox Church in Ukraine, 61.7% cited political barriers imposed by the authorities, while 34.6% stated that the Romanian state had not offered sufficient diplomatic support. 37% mentioned a lack of initiative on the part of parishioners, 33.3% attributed it to opposition from the Orthodox Church of Ukraine (OCU), 19.8% cited an uncertain legal framework and 12.3% pointed to external influences, especially from Russia.

== Position of the Orthodox Church of Ukraine ==
The Orthodox Church of Ukraine, recognized in 2019 by the Ecumenical Patriarchate of Constantinople but having only informal ties with Bucharest, opposed this move. In 2019, the Synod of the OCU established a Romanian Orthodox Vicariate to attract Romanian parishes in Ukraine, but without success.

Metropolitan Epiphanius of Kyiv, the primate of the OCU, had a harsh reaction to the formation of the Romanian Orthodox Church in Ukraine:

Just as internationally our state consistently supports the principle "nothing about Ukraine without Ukraine", the principle "nothing about Orthodoxy in Ukraine without the Orthodox Church of Ukraine" must also be respected. Our path toward the affirmation of autocephaly was long, difficult, full of suffering and martyrdom. No one, neither from the outside nor from the inside, has the right to ignore or despise all of this [...] We emphasize once again the principles already expressed in our previous decisions: the Orthodox Church of Ukraine is ready and willing to offer believers of Romanian ethnicity in Ukraine, within its own jurisdiction, the same rights of church self-governance that Ukrainians have within the Romanian Orthodox Church [...] A parallel structure imposed without respecting the Tomos of autocephaly will not bring good to the Romanians in Ukraine, but only a deepening of problems and divisions [...] If even on the territory of Moldova, where there are no linguistic or ethnic divisions, despite all the efforts made by the Romanian Patriarchate over the past three decades, a deep church division continues to exist, this challenge is all the more current for Ukraine.

— Metropolitan Epiphanius on the Romanian Orthodox Church in Ukraine

Bishop Feohnost Bodoreak of Chernivtsi also criticized the idea: "I doubt that the Romanian Orthodox Church would want to violate church canons and create its own church in another country. They are not Russians."
