= Dranytsia =

Village in Chernivtsi Oblast, Ukraine

Dranytsia Драниця Șendreni
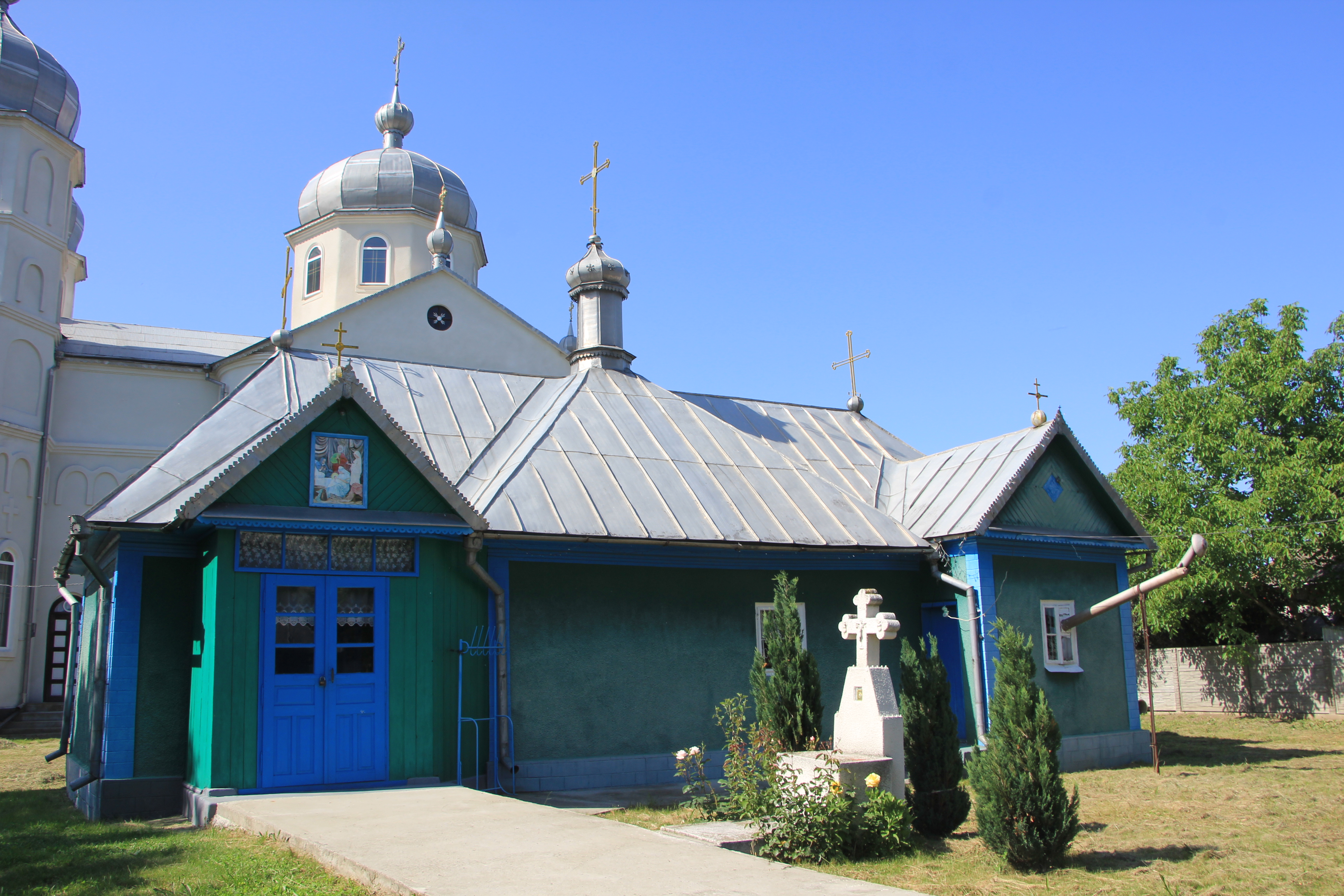
- The Church of the Nativity of the Most Holy Theotokos (est. 1843) in the village of Dranytsia

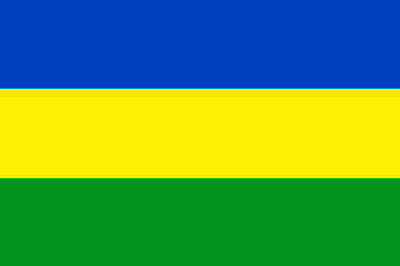
- Flag

- Location of Dranytsia in Ukraine Dranytsia (Ukraine)
- Coordinates: 48°13′47″N 26°31′55″E
- Country: Ukraine
- Oblast: Chernivtsi Oblast
- Raion: Dniester Raion
- Hromada: Mamalyha rural hromada
- Founded: a. 1843

Area
  - Total: 1.57 km^{2} (0.61 sq mi)
- Elevation: 118 m (387 ft)

Population
  - Total: 1,986
  - Density: 1,260/km^{2} (3,280/sq mi)
- Time zone: UTC+2 (EET)
  - Summer (DST): UTC+3 (EEST)
- Postal code: 60356
- Area code: +380 3733
- KATOTTH: UA73040090030034170

Dranytsia (Ukrainian: Драниця; Romanian: Șendreni) is a village in Dniester Raion, Chernivtsi Oblast, Ukraine. It belongs to Mamalyha rural hromada, one of the hromadas of Ukraine. Until August 2015, it served as the administrative centre of Dranytsia silrada, to which the village of Nehryntsi (Romanian: Negreni) was also subordinated. It was historically a part of Bessarabia.

Until 18 July 2020, Dranytsia belonged to Novoselytsia Raion. The raion was abolished in July 2020 as part of the administrative reform of Ukraine, which reduced the number of raions of Chernivtsi Oblast to three. The area of Novoselytsia Raion was split between Chernivtsi Raion and Dniester Raion, with Dranytsia being transferred to Dniester Raion. In 2001, 97.33% of the inhabitants spoke Romanian as their native language, with a minority of Ukrainian speakers (2.21%).
