= Balkivtsi, Chernivtsi Oblast =

Village in Chernivtsi Oblast, Ukraine

Balkivtsi Балківці Bălcăuți, Balkoutz
- The Church of St Michael in the village of Balkivtsi

- Location of Balkivtsi in Ukraine Balkivtsi (Ukraine)
- Coordinates: 48°21′9″N 26°34′27″E
- Country: Ukraine
- Oblast: Chernivtsi Oblast
- Raion: Dniester Raion
- Hromada: Mamalyha rural hromada
- Founded: 1454
- Elevation: 187 m (614 ft)

Population
  - Total: 1,577
- Time zone: UTC+2 (EET)
  - Summer (DST): UTC+3 (EEST)
- Postal code: 60360
- Area code: +380 3733
- KATOTTH: UA73040090020035657

Balkivtsi (Ukrainian: Балківці; Romanian: Bălcăuți; German: Balkoutz) is a village in Dniester Raion, Chernivtsi Oblast, Ukraine. It belongs to Mamalyha rural hromada, one of the hromadas of Ukraine. Until August 2015, it served as the administrative centre and sole constituent settlement of Balkivtsi silrada.

Until 18 July 2020, Balkivtsi belonged to Novoselytsia Raion. The raion was abolished in July 2020 as part of the administrative reform of Ukraine, which reduced the number of raions of Chernivtsi Oblast to three. The area of Novoselytsia Raion was split between Chernivtsi Raion and Dniester Raion, with Balkivtsi being transferred to Dniester Raion. n 2001, 96.76% of the inhabitants spoke Romanian as their native language, while 2,41% spoke Ukrainian.
