= Pavlo Unguryan =

Ukrainian politician

- Павло Унгурян
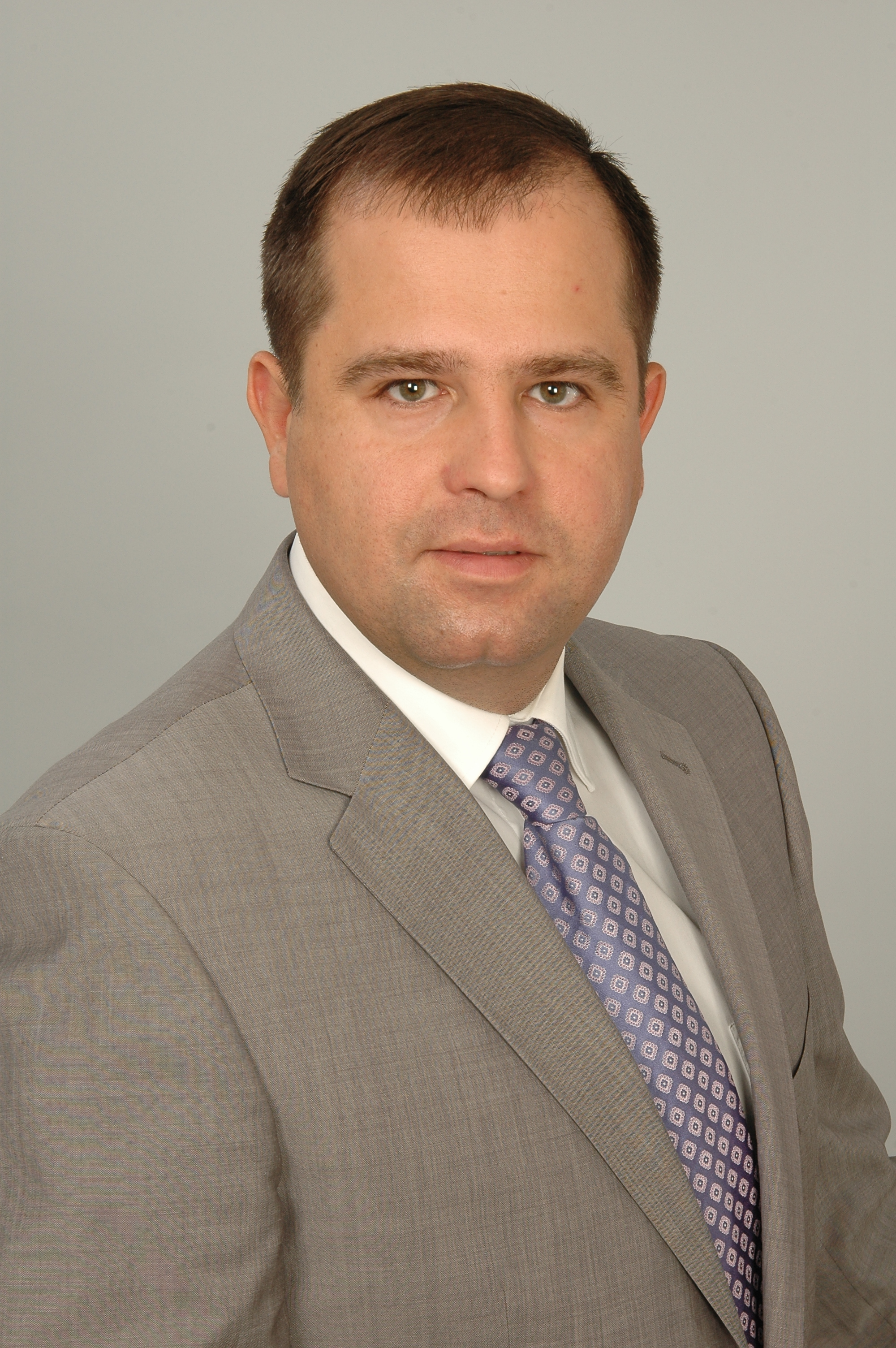

People's Deputy of Ukraine

Personal details
- Born: 12 November 1979 (age 46)

Pavlo "Pavel" Unguryan (Ukrainian: Павло́́ Унгуря́н; born November 12, 1979) is a Ukrainian political and evangelical leader, who served as a Member of the Ukrainian Parliament until 2019.

In 2002 Unguryan earned a law degree from the National University "Odesa Law Academy". Then he headed the office for strategic planning at the Department of Environment and Natural Resources of Ukraine. In 2006 he was elected as a member of Odesa City Council where he served until 2008. In 2008 Unguryan was elected as the Member of Parliament of Ukraine and served until 2012. In executive power, Unguryan worked as Deputy Secretary of Environment and Natural Resources Department of Ukraine in 2014. In the same year, he was elected as a Member of Parliament. Since 2015 he was a member of the Ukrainian delegation to the Parliamentary Assembly of the Council of Europe.

Unguryan positions himself as an Evangelical Christian and as one of the conservative political leaders of Ukraine.

== Education ==
In 1997 Unguryan entered the National University "Odesa Law Academy" and in 2002 received a degree in law as one of the finest students. From 2003 to 2007 he studied public administration in the National Academy for Public Administration under the President of Ukraine. In 2012 Unguryan defended the thesis and received a Candidate of Sciences in Public Administration and is currently working on a PhD in law.

== Public and religious leadership ==
Unguryan is the Chairman of the Inter-Factional Parliamentary Group "For Spirituality, Morality and Health of Ukraine," which unites more than 100 lawmakers. The group has initiated several laws aimed to support churches and protect morality, spirituality, and traditional family in Ukraine.

In 2017 Unguryan was the chair of the Interfaith Organizing Committee for the 500th Anniversary of Reformation supported by the President of Ukraine on the national level.

Unguryan serves as the coordinator of the National Prayer Breakfasts in Ukraine since 2011.

During many years he took an active part in the organization of major Christian events in Ukraine, such as the Franklin Graham Festival of Hope (2007 and 2015), which was attended by more than 100,000 people. He was in charge of the organizing committees for the national events such as the 1st Youth Congress of the CIS and Baltic States (2008) which was attended by more than 3,000 people, the celebration of the 400th anniversary of Baptism (2009), in which took part approximately 5000 people, the activities surrounding the EuroCup Soccer Championship which mobilized the entire evangelical community of Ukraine and the First Ukrainian Thanksgiving Day in 2017 attended by hundreds of thousands. Pavlo Unguryan authored the legislative initiative known as “Ukraine and the whole world celebrate Christmas together" and chaired the organizing committee for its organization.

Since 2023, co-founder and chairman of the supervisory board of the NGO “Ukraine Rebuilding Alliance”.

Vice President of the Association of Ukrainian Regions «EU Strategy for the Danube Region».

Сoordinator of the Christian Platform of Ukrainian-American Partnership.

== Honors ==
- Order of Merit, III class (Decree of the President of Ukraine No. 10/2017 of January 21, 2017).
- Order of Merit, II class (Decree of the President of Ukraine No. 616/2025 of August 23, 2025).
