= Dynivtsi =

Commune in Chernivtsi Oblast, Ukraine

Dynivtsi Динівці
- Interactive map of Dynivtsi
- Coordinates: 48°19′47″N 26°18′0″E
- Country: Ukraine
- Oblast: Chernivtsi Oblast
- Raion: Chernivtsi Raion
- Time zone: UTC+2 (EET)
  - Summer (DST): UTC+3 (EEST)

Dinivtsi (Ukrainian: Динівці; Romanian: Dinăuți) is a commune (selsoviet) in Chernivtsi Raion, Chernivtsi Oblast, Ukraine. It belongs to Novoselytsia urban hromada, one of the hromadas of Ukraine.

Until 18 July 2020, Dynivtsi, historically a part of the province of Bessarabia, belonged to Novoselytsia Raion. The raion was abolished in July 2020 as part of the administrative reform of Ukraine, which reduced the number of raions of Chernivtsi Oblast to three. The area of Novoselytsia Raion was split between Chernivtsi and Dniester Raions, with Dynivtsi being transferred to Chernivtsi Raion. In 2001, 96.14% of the inhabitants spoke Romanian as their native language (69.93% called in Moldovan and 26.21% Romanian), while 3.48% spoke Ukrainian. According to the 1989 census, the number of inhabitants who declared themselves Romanians plus Moldovans was 3,026 (22 Romanians or 0.68% and 3,004 Moldovans or 92.79%), representing 93.48% of the population of 3,237. A large minority of the population switched their declared census identities from Moldovan and Moldovan-speaking to Romanian and Romanian-speaking between the 1989 and 2001 censuses, and the process has continued ever since.

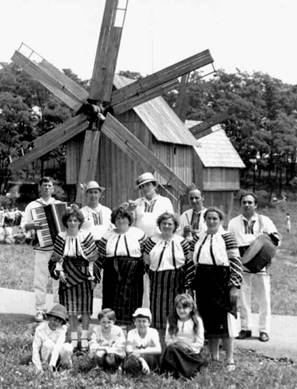
Dynivtsi

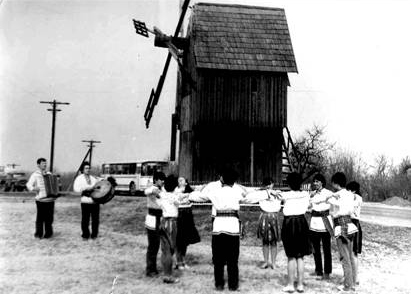
Dynivtsi

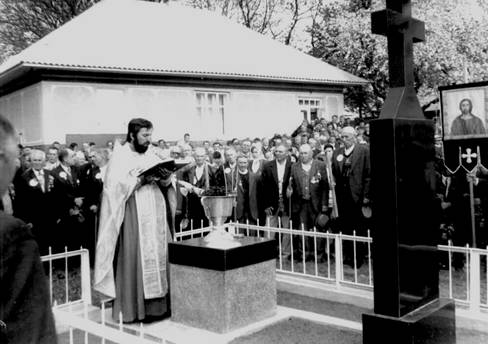
Dynivtsi
