= Mahala, Chernivtsi Oblast =

Village in Chernivtsi Oblast, Ukraine

Mahala
- Village
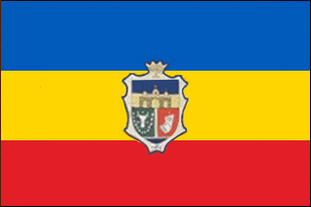
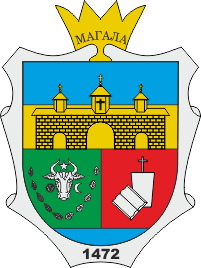
- Flag Coat of arms

- Location in Ukraine Mahala (Chernivtsi Oblast)
- Coordinates: 48°18′6″N 26°2′25″E
- Country: Ukraine
- Oblast: Chernivtsi
- Raion: Chernivtsi Raion
- Elevation: 152 m (499 ft)
- Time zone: UTC+2 (CET)
  - Summer (DST): UTC+3 (CEST)

Mahala (Ukrainian: Магала; Romanian: Mahala) is a village in Chernivtsi Raion, Chernivtsi Oblast, Ukraine with a predominantly Romanian population. It hosts the administration of Mahala rural hromada, one of the hromadas of Ukraine.

Until 18 July 2020, Mahala belonged to Novoselytsia Raion. The raion was abolished in July 2020 as part of the administrative reform of Ukraine, which reduced the number of raions of Chernivtsi Oblast to three. The area of Novoselytsia Raion was split between Chernivtsi and Dniester Raions, with Mahala being transferred to Chernivtsi Raion.

== History ==
Mahala has been part of the Principality of Moldova since its establishment in the historical region of Bukovina. The first historical mention of village of Mahala dated 1472 in the documents of the Moldavian Lord Stephen the Great. The village of Mahala is mentioned in the documents of the Church Foundation in the 15th century. From the same documents it is known as the village of Ostritsa which was donated by Stefan the Great to Monastery of Putna. This village was purchased by the Lord of Moldova for 200 tatar zlotys from Tabuchi from Kobli, his brother Pozhar and their sister Nastasia. In 1514 the son of Stefan the Great Bohdan III One-eyed owed allegiance to a Turkish sultan and became a Turkish protectorate.

In January 1775, as a result of the attitude of neutrality during the military conflict between Turkey and Russia (1768–1774), the Habsburg Empire (present-day Austria) received part of the territory of Moldavia, a territory known as Bucovina. After the annexation of Bukovina the village of Mahala was part of the Duchy of Bukovina, ruled by the Austrians, part of the Sadagura district (in German Sadagora).

After the Union of Bucovina with Romania on November 28, 1918, the village of Mahala became part of Romania. At that time, the population was composed almost entirely of Romanians.

As a result of the Ribbentrop-Molotov Pact (1939), Northern Bukovina was annexed by the USSR on June 28, 1940 (re-entered in Romania as part in 1941–1944) Then, Northern Bukovina was reoccupied again by the USSR in 1944 and integrated into the Ukrainian SSR.

From 1991 to 2020, the village of Mahala was a part of the Noua Suliță/Novoselytsia Raion of the Chernivtsi region of independent Ukraine. According to the 1989 census, the number of inhabitants of Mahala who declared themselves Romanians plus Moldovans was 2,231 (16 + 2,215), representing 90.40% of the population. In 2001, 92.52% of the inhabitants spoke Romanian (59.91% self-identified Moldovan and 32.60% self-identified Romanian) as their native language, with Ukrainian (5.96%) and Russian (1.45%) speakers in the minority. A significant proportion of the population switched their declared census identities from Moldovan and Moldovan-speaking to Romanian and Romanian-speaking between the 1989 and 2001 censuses, and the process has continued ever since.

Ostrytsia village of the same commune had 2,368 inhabitants in 2001; out of them, 1.44% spoke Ukrainian and 98.27% spoke Romanian (38.22% called it Moldovan and 60.05% called it Romanian) and 0.25% Russian. In 1989, 1.55% of the 2,058 people were ethnic Ukrainians, 0.49% were ethnic Romanians, 97.18% were ethnic Moldovans, and 0.29% were ethnic Russians. A majority of the population switched their declared census identities from Moldovan and Moldovan-speaking to Romanian and Romanian-speaking between the 1989 and 2001 censuses, and the process has continued ever since. The reason why the "Moldovan" identity was dominant during the Soviet period, but was replaced by the "Romanian" one after 1989, including in Ostrytsia, was the fact that the inhabitants of the Chernivtsi and Sadagura rural raions, and of the Bukovinian part of the Novoselytsia rural raion, were pressured in 1944 to adopt a "Moldovan" national/ethnic identity.

According to the 2001 census, the majority of the population of the village of Buda (which had 1,452 inhabitants) of the same commune was Romanian-speaking (84.99%, or 1,234 people, including 54.27% who called their language Moldovan, or 788 people, and 30.72% who call their language Romanian, or 446 people), and there were also Ukrainian speakers (14.19%, or 206 people) and Russian-speakers.(0.69% or 10 people). In 1989, out of 1,293 people in the village, 1,160 were Moldovans (89.71%) and 8 were Romanians (0.62%). A significant proportion of the population switched their declared census identities from Moldovan and Moldovan-speaking to Romanian and Romanian-speaking between the 1989 and 2001 censuses, and the process has continued ever since.

According to the 2001 census, 93.96% of the population of the Prut village from the same commune (397 people) was Romanian-speaking (93.95%, or 373 people, including 82.12% who called the language Moldovan, or 326 individuals, and 2.52% who called it Romanian, or 47), and 4.79% spoke Ukrainian (19 people) and 1.26% Russian (5 people). In 1989, out of 296 people in the village, 286 were Moldovans (96.62%), 3 were Romanians (1.01%), 4 were Ukrainians (1.35%) and 3 Russians (1.01%). A majority of the population switched their declared census identities from Moldovan and Moldovan-speaking to Romanian and Romanian-speaking between the 1989 and 2001 censuses, and the process has continued ever since.

In 2001, in the Mahala rural hromada (rural community) created in 2020, and which included not only the Romanian-speaking villages Mahala, Ostrytsia, Buda, and Prut, and also the overwhelmingly Ukrainian village of Ridkivtsi, with a population of 10,946, 4,467 of the inhabitants (40.81%) spoke Ukrainian as their native language, while 6,346 (57.98%) spoke Romanian (including 36.1%, or 3,592, who called it Moldovan, and 25.16%, or 2,754, who called it Romanian), and 121 (1.11%) spoke Russian.

== Hromada of Mahala ==
Magal United Territorial Community was formed in October 2017 as a result of the merger of two village councils: Magal village council Ridkivtsi village council.

The following settlements are subordinated to the Mahala village council:

- Mahala village (2,740 people)
- Ostrytsia village (2,432 people),
- Buda village (1,470 people)
- Prut village (502 people)

The settlements subordinated to the Mahala village council had 6,769 inhabitants; 411 of the inhabitants (6.07%) spoke Ukrainian as their native language, while 6,294 (92.98%) spoke Romanian (including 52.42%, or 3,548, who called it Moldovan, and 40.58%, or 2,747, who called it Romanian), and 58 (0.86%) spoke Russian.

The following settlements are subordinated to Ridkivtsi village council:

- Ridkivtsi village (4,503 people)

On the territory of the community there are: 3 schools, 6 kindergartens, 3 outpatient clinic, 2 houses of culture. As of January 1, 2018 the population of the village was 11,647 people.

== Notable people ==
- Grigore Nandriș (1895–1968) – Romanian linguist, philologist and memorialist, professor at the universities of Chernivtsi, Krakow, Bucharest, London and Oxford.
- Anița Nandriș (1904–1986) – peasant woman deported to Siberia, who left an extensive diary about the ordeal lived.
