= Cherlenivka =

Village in Chernivtsi Oblast, Ukraine

Cerlenivka
- Village
- Location in Ukraine Cerlenivka (Ukraine)
- Coordinates: 48°17′24″N 26°24′24″E
- Country: Ukraine
- Oblast: Chernivtsi Oblast
- Raion: Chernivtsi Raion
- Elevation: 535 ft (163 m)

Population
  - Total: 2,051
- Time zone: UTC+2 (EET)
  - Summer (DST): UTC+3 (EEST)

Cherlenivka (Ukrainian: Черленівка; Romanian: Cerlina Mare) is a village in Chernivtsi Raion, Chernivtsi Oblast, Ukraine. It belongs to Vanchykivtsi rural hromada, one of the hromadas of Ukraine.

Until 18 July 2020, Cherlenivka belonged to Novoselytsia Raion. The raion was abolished in July 2020 as part of the administrative reform of Ukraine, which reduced the number of raions of Chernivtsi Oblast to three. The area of Novoselytsia Raion was split between Chernivtsi and Dniester Raions, with Cherlenivka being transferred to Chernivtsi Raion. According to the 1989 census, the number of inhabitants who declared themselves Romanians plus Moldovans was 2,023 or 96.2% (including 4 Romanians or 0.19% plus 2,019 Moldovans, or 96.01%) out of 2,103, and they represented 96.20% of the population, while 69 inhabitants (3.28%) were Ukrainians. According to the 2001 census, out of 2,236 inhabitants, 1,502 declared their language as Moldovan (67.17%), and 645 called it Romanian (28.85%), so 96.02% overall spoke Romanian, while 3.09% spoke Ukrainian. A significant minority of the population switched their declared census identities from Moldovan and Moldovan-speaking to Romanian and Romanian-speaking between the 1989 and 2001 censuses, and the process has continued ever since.

== Notable people ==
- Anatolie Moraru (1894–1969), politician
