= Novoselytsia Raion =

Former subdivision of Chernivtsi Oblast, Ukraine

Novoselytsia Raion Новоселицький район (in Ukrainian) Raionul Noua Suliță (in Romanian)
- Raion
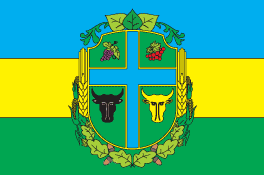
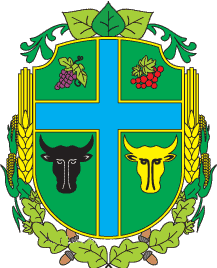
- Flag Coat of arms

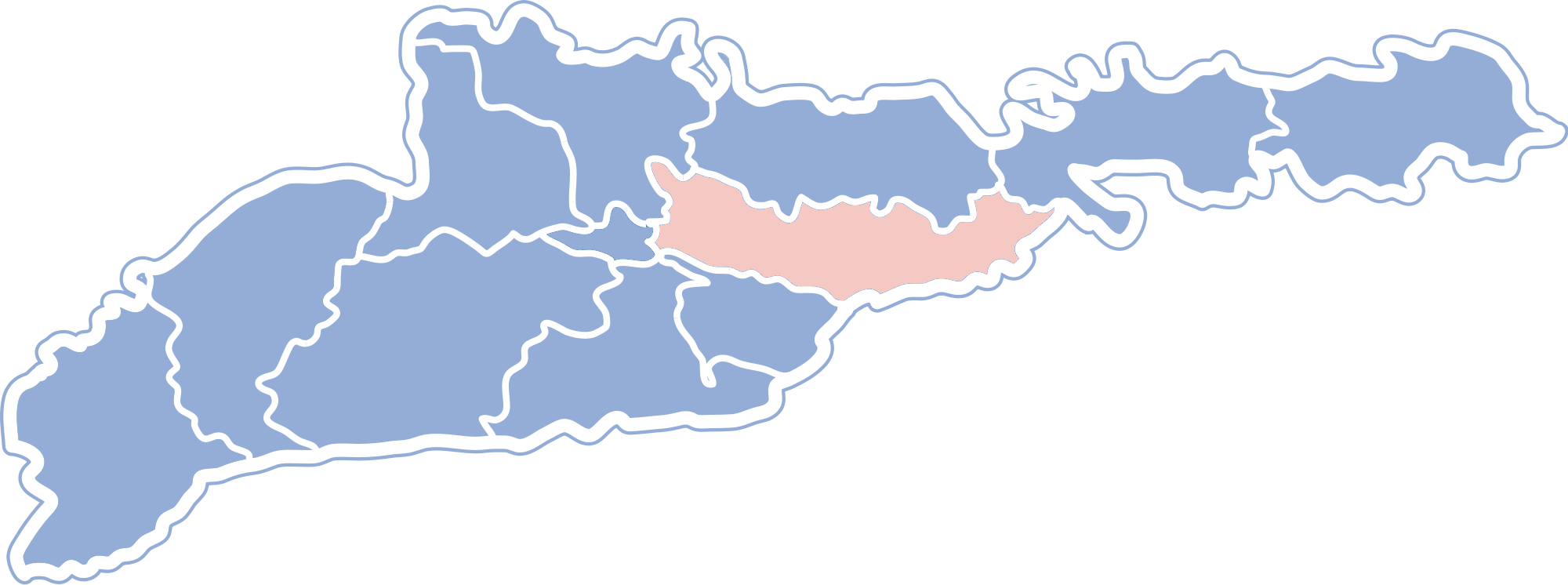
- Coordinates: 48°17′36″N 26°19′15″E
- Country: Ukraine
- Region: Chernivtsi Oblast
- Established: 1940
- Disestablished: 18 July 2020
- Admin. center: Novoselytsia
- Subdivisions: List: — city councils; — settlement councils; — rural councils; Number of localities: — cities; — urban-type settlements; 42 — villages; — rural settlements

Government
  - Governor: N/A

Area
  - Total: 734 km^{2} (283 sq mi)

Population (2020)
  - Total: 76,744
  - Density: 105/km^{2} (271/sq mi)
- Time zone: UTC+02:00 (EET)
  - Summer (DST): UTC+03:00 (EEST)
- Postal index: 604XX
- Area code: 380-3733X

Novoselytsia Raion (Ukrainian: Новоселицький район, Romanian: Raionul Noua Suliță pronounced [raˈjonul ˈnowa ˈsulit͡sə]) was a raion (administrative district) in Chernivtsi Oblast, (province) in the west of Ukraine. The western part of its territory lied in the historical region of Bukovina, the eastern part in Bessarabia, while one village (Boianivka) was part of the Hertsa region. The center of the raion was the city of Novoselytsia. The raion was abolished on 18 July 2020 as part of the administrative reform of Ukraine, which reduced the number of raions of Chernivtsi Oblast to three. The area of Novoselytsia Raion was split between Chernivtsi and Dniester Raions. The last estimate of the raion population was 76,744 (2020 est.)

== History and population ==
According to the 2001 Ukrainian Census, the raion's population was 87,241. The ethnical composition by self-identification was as follows:

Ethnicity	Ukrainians	Russians	Romanians	Moldovans	Other	Total
Population	29,703	1,235	5,904	50,329	290	87,461

In Novoselytsia Raion, among the 50,329 self-identified Moldovans (57.54%), 47,585 (54.54%) self-identified their language as Moldovan and 2,264 as Romanian (2.6%) according to the Ukrainian census of 2001; there were also 29,703 self-identified Ukrainians (35.05%), 5,904 Romanians (6.77%), 1,235 Russians (1.42%), and 290 others (0.29%). Novoselytsia raion, within its boundaries at that time, had 87,241 inhabitants in 2001, including 34.08% Ukrainian-speakers, 64% Romanian-speakers, and 1.78% Russian-speakers. In the last Soviet census of 1989, out of 86,771 inhabitants, 28,207 declared themselves Ukrainians (32.51%), 585 Romanians (0.67%), 55,669 Moldovans (64.16%), and 1,639 Russians (1.89%). The decline in the number (from 55,669 to 50,329) and proportion of self-identified Moldovans (from 64.16% to 57.54%) was explained by a switch from a census Moldovan to a census Romanian ethnic and linguistic identity, and has continued after the 2001 census. By contrast, the number of self-identified ethnic Romanians has increased (from 585 to 5,904), and so has their proportion of the population of the former raion (from 0.67% to 6.77%), and the process has continued after the 2001 census. In 2001, this was Ukraine's only raion in which an absolute majority of the population was recorded by the census as having a Moldovan identity, and one of two (the other one is the Reni Raion in the Odesa Oblast) in which those having a Moldovan identity are the largest group. In the early years of the 21st century, there was a higher birth rate in the localities with a Romanian identity population, and out-migration from most of the localities with a Moldovan identity majority, and also from the predominantly Ukrainian villages. In 2001, this was one of two raions in Ukraine that was mostly Romanian-speaking; the other one was the overwhelmingly ethnically Romanian neighboring Hertsa Raion.

Some authors have argued that many of the inhabitants of the former Novoselytsia Raion in the smaller, former Bukovinian area of the raion, who had self-identified themselves as Moldovans in 1989 self-identified themselves as Romanians in 2001. This was the case in a number of localities such as Boiany. In 2001, 92.16% of the population of 4,425 inhabitants of Boyany spoke Romanian as their native language, 4,078 people (including 2,810 who declared it as Romanian or 63.50%, and 1,268 as "Moldovan", or 28.66%), with a minority of Ukrainian speakers (6.33%). According to the 1989 Soviet census, the number of inhabitants of Boyany who declared themselves Romanian plus Moldovan was 3,764 (40 Romanians, or 0.94% plus 3,724 Moldovans, or 87.64%), representing 88.59% of the population of 4,249 inhabitants. A similar pattern could be found, for example, in the village of Ostrytsia of the Mahala urban hromada; see the article on the village of Mahala, Chernivtsi Oblast. However, in a number of other localities, such as the village of Mahala, only a large minority of the Romanian-speaking population did so by 2001. From 1991 to 2020, the village of Mahala was a part of the Noua Suliță/Novoselytsia Raion of the Chernivtsi region of independent Ukraine. According to the 1989 census, the number of inhabitants of Mahala who declared themselves Romanians plus Moldovans was 2,231 (16 + 2,215), representing 90.40% of the population. In 2001, 92.52% of the inhabitants spoke Romanian (59.91% self-identified "Moldovan" and 32.60% self-identified Romanian) as their native language, with Ukrainian (5.96%) and Russian (1.45%) speakers in the minority. In the formerly Bukovinian villages in the Boiany rural hromada and the Mahala rural hromada, made up of Bukovinian localities, where the inhabitants overwhelmingly declared their ethnic identity as Moldovan in 1989, there were 18,331 inhabitants in 2001, including 7,589 (41.4%) who declared their native language as "Moldovan", 5,690 (31.04%) who declared it to be Romanian, 4,815 (26.27%) who declared it Ukrainian, and 198 (1.08%) who declared it be Russian. The self-declared Romanian speakers were thus 42.85% of the Romanian-speaking population of this Bukovinian area, while 57.15% called their language "Moldovan". In most of the formerly Bukovinian villages of the raion, while there was typically a significant switch from a Moldovan linguistic and ethnic to a Romanian linguistic and ethnic identity from 1989 to 2001, there were still more people who claimed in 2001 that their native language was Moldovan than the number of those who called it Romanian.

Most of the Bessarabian part of the former raion is made up of the Novoselytsia urban hromada and the Vanchykivtsi rural hromada, which had 48,642 inhabitants in 2001; out of these, 29,875 (61.42%) declared themselves as "Moldovan-speakers", 15,431 as Ukrainian-speakers (31.72%), 2,114 as Romanian-speakers (4.35%) and 1,148 (2.36%) as Russian-speakers. The self-declared Romanian speakers were thus 6.61% of the Romanian-speaking population of this Bessarabian area. In a minority of the localities in the Bessarabian part of the Novoselytsia Raion of the Chernivtsi Oblast, which formed a large majority of the population of the raion, there was an increase from less than 1% self-identified ethnic Romanians, and an even lower percentage who stated that their language was Romanian (see the data for the entire raion below) in 1989 to 26-29% self-identified Romanian-speakers (as distinct from self-identified "Moldovan-speakers") in 2001, and a smaller increase in the proportion of self-identified Romanians. These include, for example, Cherlenivka and Dynivtsi.

The singer Sofia Rotaru was born in Marshyntsi, one of the Romanian speaking villages of the Raion.

The village of Tarasivtsi, located in the raion, is notable as the only place in Ukraine where the Moldovan (Romanian) language was designated as a regional language from 2012 to 2014. This occurred after Ukraine permitted regional languages to be designated in August 2012 .

== Administrative divisions ==
Novoselytsia Raion had 1 city and 30 communes:

- Novoselytsia - administrative seat
- Communes
  - Balkivtsi
  - Berestia
  - Boiany
  - Cherlenivka
  - Chornivka
  - Dovzhok
  - Dranytsia
  - Dynivtsi
  - Forosna
  - Kostychany
  - Koteleve
  - Mahala
  - Malynivka
  - Mamalyha
  - Marshyntsi
  - Nesvoia
  - Podvirne
  - Prypruttia
  - Ridkivtsi
  - Rokytne
  - Rynhach
  - Shcherbyntsi
  - Sloboda
  - Stalnivtsi
  - Strointsi
  - Tarasivtsi
  - Toporivtsi
  - Vanchykivtsi
  - Zelenyi Hai
  - Zhylivka

Of these, Boiany, Chornivka, Mahala, Sloboda, Pripruttia, Toporivtsi and Zelenyi Hai are in the historical region of Bukovina, while the remainder are in Bessarabia.

At the time of disestablishment, the raion consisted of six hromadas:

- Boiany rural hromada with the administration in the selo of Boiany, transferred to Chernivtsi Raion;
- Mahala rural hromada with the administration in the selo of Mahala, transferred to Chernivtsi Raion;
- Mamalyha rural hromada with the administration in the selo of Mamalyha, transferred to Dniester Raion;
- Novoselytsia urban hromada with the administration in Novoselytsia, transferred to Chernivtsi Raion;
- Toporivtsi rural hromada with the administration in the selo of Toporivtsi, transferred to Chernivtsi Raion;
- Vanchykivtsi rural hromada with the administration in the selo of Vanchykivtsi, transferred to Chernivtsi Raion.

Toporyvtsi rural hromada also contained three villages, Kolinkivtsi, Hrozyntsi, and Bochkivtsi, which belonged to Khotyn Raion.

In 2001, in the Boyany rural hromada (rural community) created in 2020, with a population of 7,385, 348 of the inhabitants (4.71%) spoke Ukrainian as their native language, while 6,933 (93.88%) spoke Romanian (including 3,997 who called it "Moldovan", or 54.12%, and 2,936 who called it Romanian, or 39.76%), and 77 (1.04%) spoke Russian. The Boyany rural hromada includes Boyany village, Boyanivka village, Hai village and Prypruttya village. In 2001, 92.16% of the population of 4,425 inhabitants of the village of Boiany spoke Romanian as their native language, 4,078 people (including 2,810 who declared it as Romanian or 63.50%, and 1,268 as Moldovan, or 28.66%), with a minority of Ukrainian speakers (6.33%).

In 2001, in the Mahala rural hromada (rural community) created in 2020, and which included not only the Romanian-speaking villages Mahala, Ostrytsia, Buda, and Prut, and also the overwhelmingly Ukrainian village of Ridkivtsi, with a population of 10,946, 4,467 of the inhabitants (40.81%, or 4,467 people) spoke Ukrainian as their native language, while 6,346 (57.98%, or 6,346) spoke Romanian (including 36.1%, or 3,592, who called it "Moldovan", and 25.16%, or 2,754, who called it Romanian), and 121 (1.11% or 121) spoke Russian. Ostrytsia village of the same commune had 2,368 inhabitants in 2001; out of them, 1.44% spoke Ukrainian and 98.27% spoke Romanian (38.22% called it Moldovan and 60.05% called it Romanian) and 0.25% Russian.

According to the 2001 Ukrainian census, out of 32,104 inhabitants of the Novoselytsia urban hromada, 17,697 were Romanian-speaking (55.12%), out of which 16,563 called their native language Moldovan (51.59%) and 1,134 (3.53%) called it Romanian. Moreover, 13,338 inhabitants spoke Ukrainian (41.55%) and 1,015 spoke Russian (3.16%).

In 2001, in the Vanchykovetska rural hromada (rural community) created in 2020, with a population of 16,538, 2,093 of the inhabitants (12.66%) spoke Ukrainian as their native language, while 14,292 people (86.42%) spoke Romanian (including 80.49%, or 13,312, who called it Moldovan" and 5.93%, or 980, who called it Romanian), and 133 (0.8%) spoke Russian. Therefore, four of the six hromadas included in the former raion were mostly Romanian-speaking.
