= Novoselytsia urban hromada =

Urban hromada in Chernivtsi Oblast, Ukraine

Novoselytsia urban hromada Новоселицька міська громада
- Hromada
- Interactive map of Novoselytsia urban hromada
- Country: Ukraine
- Oblast: Chernivtsi
- Raion: Chernivtsi

Area
  - Total: 220 km^{2} (85 sq mi)

Population (2021)
  - Total: 28,402
  - Density: 130/km^{2} (330/sq mi)
- Settlements: 14
- Cities: 1
- Villages: 13

Novoselytsia urban territorial hromada (Ukrainian: Новоселицька міська територіальна громада, romanized: Novoselytska miska terytorialna hromada) is a hromada of Ukraine, located in the western Chernivtsi Oblast. Its administrative centre is the city of Novoselytsia. According to the 2001 Ukrainian census, out of 32,104 inhabitants of the Novoselytsia urban hromada, 17,697 were Romanian-speaking (55.12%), out of which 16,563 called their native language Moldovan (51.59%) and 1,134 (3.53%) called it Romanian. Moreover, 13,338 inhabitants spoke Ukrainian (41.55%) and 1,015 spoke Russian (3.16%).

== Settlements ==
In addition to one city (Novoselytsia), there are 13 villages within the hromada:

- Berestia
- Dynivtsi
- Dovzhok
- Koteleve
- Malynivka
- Marshyntsi
- Revkivtsi
- Rokytne
- Rynhach
- Shyshkivtsi
- Sloboda
- Strointsi
- Zelenyi Hai
