= Dniester Raion =

Subdivision of Chernivtsi Oblast, Ukraine

Dniester Raion Дністровський район
- Raion
- Interactive map of Dniester Raion
- Country: Ukraine
- Oblast: Chernivtsi Oblast
- Established: 2020
- Admin. center: Kelmentsi
- Subdivisions: 10 hromadas

Population (2022)
  - Total: 152,208
- Time zone: UTC+02:00 (EET)
  - Summer (DST): UTC+03:00 (EEST)
- Postal index: N/A
- Website: https://dnistrovska-rda.gov.ua/

Dniester Raion (Note: Alternatively translated Dnister Raion or Dnistrovskyi Raion) (Ukrainian: Дністровський район) is a raion (district) of Chernivtsi Oblast, Ukraine. It was created on 18 July 2020 as part of the reform of administrative divisions of Ukraine. It is part of the historical region of Bessarabia. The center of the raion is the rural settlement of Kelmentsi. Three abolished raions, Kelmentsi, Khotyn, and Sokyrianys raions, part of abolished Novoselytsia Raion, as well as the city of Novodnistrovsk, which was previously incorporated as a city of oblast significance, were merged into Dniester Raion. The name of the raion is derived from the Dniester river. Population: 152,208 (2022 estimate).

On 12 June 2020, as part of a draft proposal for the administrative reform, the Cabinet of Ministers suggested expanding Khotyn Raion with its administrative center in Khotyn. However, on 1 July, a committee of the Verkhovna Rada (parliament) instead proposed relocating the center to Kelmentsi due to its central location, selecting a neutral raion name derived from the Dniester to reduce social tension. This proposal sparked opposition among Khotyn residents, who blocked the road to Ataky for over two weeks in protest, injuring one police officer. On 17 July, about 200 residents of Khotyn held a public discussion aimed at preserving the city's administrative status. The following day, the Verkhovna Rada passed the reform bill, confirming Kelmentsi as the administrative center.

== Subdivisions ==
At the time of establishment, the raion consisted of 10 hromadas:

- Kelmentsi settlement hromada with the administration in the rural settlement of Kelmentsi, transferred from Kelmentsi Raion;
- Khotyn urban hromada with the administration in the city of Khotyn, transferred from Khotyn Raion;
- Klishkivtsi rural hromada with the administration in the selo of Klishkivtsi, transferred from Khotyn Raion;
- Livyntsi rural hromada with the administration in the selo of Livyntsi, transferred from Kelmentsi Raion;
- Mamalyha rural hromada with the administration in the selo of Mamalyha, transferred from Novoselytsia Raion;
- Nedoboivtsi rural hromada with the administration in the selo of Nedoboivtsi, transferred from Khotyn Raion;
- Novodnistrovsk urban hromada with the administration in the city of Novodnistrovsk, previously incorporated as a city of oblast significance;
- Rukshyn rural hromada with the administration in the selo of Rukshyn, transferred from Khotyn Raion.
- Sokyriany urban hromada with the administration in the city of Sokyriany, transferred from Sokyriany Raion;
- Vashkivtsi rural hromada with the administration in the selo of Vashkivtsi, transferred from Sokyriany Raion.

== Villages ==
- Bilivtsi
