= Fântâna Albă massacre =

1941 mass killing of ethnic Romanians by Soviet troops at the Romanian–Soviet border

- Fântâna Albă massacre (Ukraine)
- Location: 47°58′37″N 25°53′00″E; Fântâna Albă, Ukrainian SSR, Soviet Union (now Staryi Vovchynets, Ukraine)
- Date: 1 April 1941 (CET)
- Target: ethnic Romanians attempting to cross the border from the Soviet Union into Romania
- Deaths: approx. 50 to 200
- Perpetrators: NKVD, Soviet Border Troops

The Fântâna Albă massacre took place on 1 April 1941 in Northern Bukovina when up to 200 civilians were killed by Soviet Border Troops as they attempted to cross the border from the Soviet Union to Romania near the village of Fântâna Albă, now Staryi Vovchynets in Chernivtsi Oblast, Ukraine. Although according to Soviet official reports, no more than 44 civilians were killed, but local witnesses assert a much higher toll, stating that survivors were tortured, killed, or buried in mass graves. Others were taken away to be tortured and killed at the hands of the NKVD, the Soviet secret police. Some sources have referred to the massacre as "the Romanian Katyn".

Romanian newspaper Adevărul has given death tolls for the massacre as high as 2,000 to 3,000. Moldovan historian Constantin Ungureanu noted that figures of a few thousands killed presented in press and television are exaggerated, adding that it was also inaccurate that the massacre took place on Easter as it had been stated especially on television and as Adevărul also claimed, since Eastern Orthodox Easter was on 20 April in 1941.

In 2011, the Chamber of Deputies of Romania adopted a law establishing 1 April as the National Day honoring the memory of Romanian victims of massacres at Fântâna Albă, Lunca, and other areas, of deportations, of hunger, and of other forms of repression organized by the Soviet regime in Hertsa (now Ukraine), northern Bukovina, and Bessarabia.

== Background ==
The division of Bukovina after 28 June 1940

In late June 1940, the Kingdom of Romania was forced to withdraw from a territory inhabited by 3.76 million people, submitting to an ultimatum by the Soviet Union that resulted in the Soviet occupation of Bessarabia and Northern Bukovina. The Romanian administration and military were evacuated while the Red Army and the NKVD quickly occupied the region. The rapid change in administration and redrawing of the border caught many families by surprise, leaving family members trapped on both sides. Many people therefore tried to cross the new border, with or without official permission. According to official Soviet data, in the area patrolled by the 97th Unit of the Soviet Border Troops, 471 people had crossed the border illegally from the districts of Hlyboka, Hertsa, Putila, and Storozhynets. The zone assigned to this unit extended from the border to about 7.5 km (4.7 mi) south of Chernivtsi.

From the more remote areas of Chernivtsi Oblast (the northern portion of the acquired territories that were included in the USSR), such as the districts of Vashkivtsi, Zastavna, Novoselytsia, Sadhora, and Chernivtsi-rural, 628 people crossed the border to find refuge in Romania. This phenomenon cut across all ethnic and social groups in the occupied territories. A Ukrainian scholar estimated the number of refugees to Romania during the first year of Soviet administration at 7,000.

The Soviet authorities' reaction to these mass immigrations was twofold. First, border patrol efforts were strengthened. Second, lists were made of families that had one or more members who had fled to Romania and who were thus considered "traitors to the Motherland", making them subject to deportation to labor camps. On 1 January 1941, the lists made by the 97th Unit of the Soviet Border Guards mentioned 1,085 persons. Tables for other localities included names for 1,294 people (on 7 December 1940). At this point, even people who were merely suspected of intending to flee to Romania began to be included.

On 19 November 1940, 40 families containing a total of 105 people from the village of Suceveni, also carrying 20 guns, tried to cross the frontier at Fântâna Albă. At night, a battle ensued with the Soviet border guards, during which three people were killed and two were wounded and captured by the Soviets, while the rest of the group (including five wounded) managed to arrive in Rădăuți, on the other side of the border. However, in short order, the relatives of those 105 people were all arrested and deported to Siberia.

In January 1941, over 100 villagers from Mahala, Ostrița, Horecea, and other villages successfully crossed the border and arrived in Romania. This gave confidence to other villagers. Consequently, a group of over 500 people from the villages of Mahala, Cotul Ostriței, Buda, Șirăuți, Horecea-Urbana, and Ostrița tried to cross to Romania during the night of 6 February 1941. However, they had been denounced to the authorities and were discovered by the border guards at 06:00. In the subsequent Lunca massacre, volleys of machine gun fire from multiple directions resulted in numerous dead, including the organizers N. Merticar, N. Nica, and N. Isac. About 57 people managed to reach Romania, but 44 others were arrested and tried as "members of a counter-revolutionary organization". On 14 April 1941, the Kiev Military District Tribunal sentenced 12 of them to death, while the other 32 were each sentenced to 10 years forced labor and 5 years of loss of civic rights. As had been the case before, all the family members of these "traitors to the Motherland" were also arrested and deported to Siberia.

== Massacre ==
On 26 March 1941, in Storozhynets, Vasile Luca gave a speech in front of a mass of people who were protesting the Soviet administration, calling them "spies, enemies, and diversionists"; the crowd responded with heckling. On 1 April 1941, approximately 2,000 to 2,500 or 3,000 unarmed people from several villages (Pătrăuții de Sus, Pătrăuții de Jos, Cupca, Corcești, and Suceveni), carrying a white flag and religious symbols, walked together towards the new Soviet-Romanian border. There were rumors circulating that the Soviets would now permit crossing to Romania; most Romanian and Ukrainian historians agree that such rumors had been spread by the Soviet services in order to trap Romanians and make an example out of their killing in order to instill fear in the rest of the Romanian population in Bukovina, although a smaller number of Ukrainian historians suggest such rumors were instead spread by the Romanian intelligence services. The Soviet border guards attempted to turn back the large crowd several times, issuing a final verbal warning and firing shots in the air when the people arrived at Varnystia, near the border. When the civilian convoy pressed on, the border guards began to shoot, reportedly after some of the civilians fired their own weapons. At around 7 PM, a group of about 100–120 people from Carapciu, Iordănești, and Prisăcăreni were attacked on the outskirts of Suceveni; 24 of them were killed and another 43 wounded. A partial listing of the victims which were later identified:

- From Carapciu: Nicolae Corduban, Teodor Dabâca, Cosma Opaiț, Gheorghe Opaiț, Vasile Opaiț, Cosma Tovarnițchi, Ilie Tovarnițchi, Gheorghe Tovarnițchi, Traian Tovarnițchi, Vasile Tovarnițchi.
- From Cupca: Ioan Belmega, Gheorghe Bicer, Ioan Dușceac, Ioan Gaza, Arcadie Plevan, Mihai Țugui.
- From Dimca (Trestiana): Petre Cimbru, Vasile Cimbru, Nicolae Drevariuc, Petre Jianu.
- From Iordănești: Gheorghe A. Carp, Mihai Corduban, Dumitru Halac, Ion Halac, Nicolae Halac, Dumitru Opaiț, Constantin Molnar.
- From Pătrăuții de Jos: Zaharia Boiciu, Ana Feodoran, Gheorghe Feodoran, Nicolae Feodoran, Teodor Feodoran, Maftei Gavriliuc, Simion Liciman, Ion Pătrăuceanu, Ștefan Pavel, Rahila Pojoga, Petru Popescu, Pavel Savu.
- From Pătrăuții de Sus: Constantin Cuciureanu, Gheorghe Moțoc, Arcadie Ursulean, Varvara Ursulean.
- From Petriceni: Cozma Botariu, Gheorghe Lazurca.
- From Suceveni: Dragoș Bostan, Titiana Lupăștean, Ilie Mihailovici, Gheorghe Sidoreac, Vasile Sidoreac, Constantin Sucevean.
- Other people shot and killed that day: Ion Cobliuc, Petru Costaș, Ion Hudima, Petru Palahniuc.

The exact death toll remains a matter of controversy. According to the Soviet official report, casualty figures amounted to 44 people (17 from Pătrăuții de Jos, 12 from Trestiana, 5 each from Cupca and Suceveni, 3 from Pătrăuții de Sus, and 2 from Oprișeni), although the numbers were much higher according to many survivor testimonies. Moldovan political scientist Aurelian Lavric estimates that, from the initial group of 2,000 people who came to Fântâna Albă that day, some 200 were killed directly by gunfire, and many more wounded, with an additional 24 killed and 43 wounded from a separate group of 100 persons from Carapciu, Iordănești, and Prisăcăreni. Ukrainian historian Serhiy Hakman on the other hand estimates around 50 killed and many wounded. According to eyewitness accounts, some of the wounded were caught afterwards, tied to horses, and dragged to previously excavated mass graves, where they were killed with shovels or buried alive. Other wounded were brought to the Hlyboka NKVD headquarters, where they were tortured and many died. Some of the latter, after being tortured, were taken to the city's Jewish cemetery and thrown alive into a common grave over which quicklime was poured.

An account of the events is given by one of the few surviving eyewitnesses, Gheorghe Mihailiuc (born in 1925, a retired high-school teacher), in his book Dincolo de cuvintele rostite ("Beyond spoken words"), published in 2004 by Vivacitas, in Hlyboka. Mihailiuc describes what happened at Fântâna Albă on 1 April 1941 as a "massacre", a "genocide", and a "slaughter". Ion Varta from Chișinău is of the opinion that "the Romanians from Bucovina were lured into a trap, in order to give an exemplary lesson to all those who wanted to cross the border into Romania. Horror and fear had to enter their bones, so that in the future they would no longer nurture such a desire."

After the massacre, many participants and family members were arrested and either executed, incarcerated, or deported to Siberia or Kazakhstan. The Soviet authorities accused 22 people of instigating the march to the border on 1 April 1941. Vasile Grijincu was sentenced to death, and his wife and 8 children were deported to Kazakhstan; others were sentenced by a military court to either 10 years of hard labor (Ioan Boiciuc, Constantin Coroamă, Ilie Dâca, Teodor Dâca, Teodor Comarița, Ilie Cuciureanu, Nicolae Motrescu, Vasile Onifriciuc, Gheorghe Pojoga, Nicolae Pojoga, Petru Pojoga, Simion Pojoga, Gheorghe Popescu, Ioan Popescu, and Ilie Vasca) or 8 years of hard labor (Teodor Clingher, Cosma Crâsneanu, Orest Dugan, Petru Schipor, and Vasile Zmoșu). Out of the 22 convicted persons, 19 died in the camps and only three (Teodor Dâca, Orest Dugan, and Ilie Vasca) returned home in 1961.

== Aftermath and larger context ==
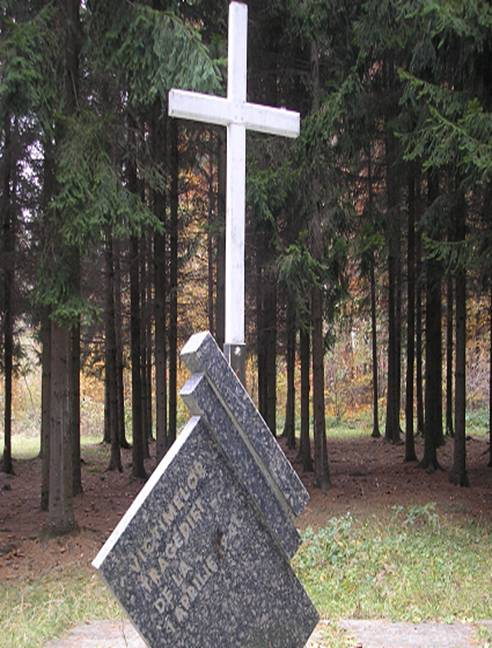
Memorial in Bila Krynytsia to the victims of the massacre

During 1940–1941, between 11,000 and 13,000 Bukovinians (mostly but not exclusively ethnic Romanians) were deported to Siberia and the Gulag, 1,421 of them dying in the camps. As a result of immigration, deportations, and killings, the Romanian population of the Chernivtsi region dropped by more than 75,000 between the Romanian 1930 census and the first Soviet census of 1959. It has been claimed that these persecutions were part of a program of deliberate extermination, planned and executed by the Soviet regime.

According to Ukrainian political scientist Marin Gherman, Soviet narratives about the Fântâna Albă massacre had two main objectives — to obscure the details of the slaughter and to present it as an action of the Romanian and German intelligence services, so as to absolve the Soviet authorities of responsibility. Gherman points out that these narratives continue to this day: in March 2021, the Facebook page of the Chernivtsi Regional State Administration published a video about the massacre, stating that only 50 people were killed, omitting the fact that these were ethnic Romanians, and labelling the action "a planned and deliberate act of defiance by the Romanian secret service against the inhabitants of Bukovina." In rebuttal, MEP Eugen Tomac stated that those who produced the video claiming that only 50 citizens were killed at Fântâna Albă were inspired by Stalin's theses, and denounced this fact as unacceptable.

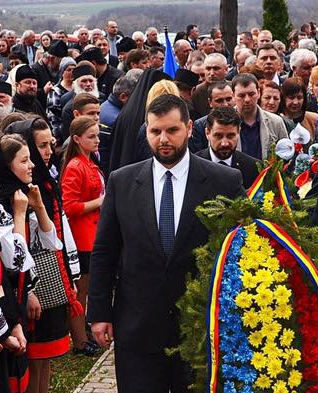
Minister delegate Dan Stoenescu commemorating the Fântâna Albă massacre in 2016

On 1 April 2016, the 75th anniversary of the massacre, a ceremony was held in Fântâna Albă, with the participation of the Governor of Chernivtsi Oblast, the abbot of Putna Monastery, and several Romanian officials, including Dan Stoenescu and Viorel Badea. In an interview, Stoenescu stated that "this tragedy of the Romanian people was followed by other retaliations as the one in 1941 when other thousands of Romanians of Bukovina, many of them being the relatives of the victims of Fântâna Albă massacre, were taken away from their houses and deported to Siberia and Kazakhstan."

In 2021, the Ukrainian authorities of Chernivtsi Oblast published a video claiming that the Fântâna Albă massacre was in fact carried out by the Romanian Secret Service, and not by the NKVD, which was met with criticism from both the Romanian authorities and from the ethnic Romanians in Ukraine.

== See also ==
- Lunca massacre
- List of massacres in the Soviet Union
- Katyn massacre
- Tatarka common graves

== References and sources ==
- (in Romanian) Vasile Ilica, "Martiri și mărturii din nordul Bucovinei (Fântâna Albă-Suceveni-Lunca-Crasna-Ijești...)", Oradea, 2003
- (in Romanian) Vasile Mănescu, "Masacrul de la Fîntîna Albă", Monitorul de Neamț, 4 April 2006
- Popescu, Ion (13 February 2005). "Crearea regiunii Cernăuți". Obsevatorul (in Romanian).
- Târâțeanu, Vasile (May 2007). "Scriitorul nu poate exista în afara cetății (interviu de Emanoil Toma)". Luceafărul Românesc (in Romanian).
