= Ilie Motrescu =

Romanian writer and publicist in Soviet Ukraine

- Born: 18 August 1941; Crasna Putnei, Romania (now Krasnoilsk, Ukraine)
- Died: 26 July 1969 (aged 27); Forests around Krasnoilsk, Ukrainian SSR, Soviet Union
- Education: Alecu Russo Pedagogical Institute
- Occupations: Writer, publicist

Ilie Motrescu (18 August 1941 – 26 July 1969) was a Romanian writer and publicist in Soviet Ukraine. Born in Crasna Putnei, he became teacher of Romanian language and literature and later editor at the Romanian-language newspaper Zorile Bucovinei following his graduation from the Alecu Russo Pedagogical Institute in Bălți in 1964. He disappeared in the summer of 1969, having reportedly been killed by the KGB, and is today a martyr among the Romanian minority in Ukraine.

== Biography ==
Ilie Motrescu was born on 18 August 1941 in Crasna Putnei, in the Kingdom of Romania (now in Ukraine). He was the son of peasants Ana (née Pleșca) and Ion Motrescu. He completed middle school in Chudei (Romanian: Ciudei) in 1959, after which he graduated from the Alecu Russo Pedagogical Institute (now the Alecu Russo State University) in Bălți in the Moldavian SSR (now Moldova) in 1964. Motrescu was then teacher of Romanian language and literature at a middle school in Krasna Ilska (Crasna Ilschi) from 1964 to 1967. After this, he was employed as a literary editor and later correspondent at the Romanian-language newspaper Zorile Bucovinei, also publishing articles and poetry in other publications such as Cultura and Tinerimea Moldovei.

Motrescu disappeared under mysterious circumstances in the summer of 1969. Ukrainian Romanian writer and activist Vasile Tărâțeanu asserted that he was likely killed by agents of the KGB, the Soviet Union's secret police, in the forests around Krasnoilsk (Crasna or Crasna-Ilschi). His body would have been thrown into the Prut river, and he was buried as an unidentified person in a cemetery in Chernivtsi (Cernăuți). Tărâțeanu gave 26 July 1969 as the date of his death. According to Ukrainian Romanian writer, translator and journalist Arcadie Suceveanu, Motrescu's disappearance served as an indirect warning by the KGB to the new generation of young Romanian poets from Northern Bukovina of the time, which "grew and formed under the spectre of the death of Ilie Motrescu". Due to his fate, Motrescu is often described as a martyr.

Motrescu's verses, including many that remained in unpublished manuscripts, were included following his death in various collections in Moldova, Romania and Ukraine. His verses were also reproduced in various publications such as Arcașul, Concordia, Cronica, Dunărea de Jos, Glasul Bucovinei, Literatura și Arta, Plai românesc, Septentrion literar and the almanac Țara Fagilor, as well as Zorile Bucovinei. According to Motrescu's former fellow Zorile Bucovinei editor Ion Țâbuleac, compiler of the poetry and prose volume Hora vieții (2001), Motrescu had his own nerve and his own way "of seeing and interpreting the facts and phenomena of life", adding that his writing represented dialogues and conversations with someone close and dear, this being portrayed in his poems Hora vieții ("The Hora of Life") and Cântecul vâslașului ("The Song of the Rower"). In one of his most substantial poems, Semn ("Mark"), Motrescu energetically expresses the dignity of his Romanian ancestry, which resisted the passage of time and emerged victorious against the times of hardship.
