= Genocide in Ukraine =

Genocide in Ukraine or Ukrainian genocide may refer to:

- Pogroms during the Russian Civil War, 1918–1920 antisemitic massacres of Jewish villages in Ukraine and southern Russia
- Holodomor, 1932–1933 man-made famine in Soviet Ukraine and its surroundings perpetrated by the Soviet Union
- The Holocaust in Ukraine, aspect of the 1941–1944 genocide of European Jews by Nazi Germany
- Instances of repression against Romanians in Soviet Ukraine:
  - Fântâna Albă massacre, 1941
  - Lunca massacre, 1941
  - Soviet deportations from Bessarabia and Northern Bukovina, 1940–1951
- Massacres of Poles in Volhynia and Eastern Galicia, 1943–1945, by the Ukrainian Insurgent Army
- Deportation of the Crimean Tatars, 1944, by the Soviet Union
- Allegations of genocide of Ukrainians in the Russo-Ukrainian War

== See also ==
- Holodomor genocide question, concerning the historical debate over the nature of the Holodomor
- List of massacres in Ukraine
- Ukraine v. Russian Federation (2022), an International Court of Justice case
- Ukrainian collaboration with Nazi Germany
