= Amihălăchioaie =

Amihălăchioaie or Amihalachioaie is a surname found in Romania and Moldova. Notable people with the surname include:

- Gheorghe Amihalachioaie (born 1949), Moldovan lawyer and politician
- Mihai Amihalachioaie (1961–2024), Moldovan accordionist and conductor
