= Aurica Bojescu =

Ukrainian Romanian lawyer, minority rights activist and politician

- Born: 6 January 1961; Karapchiv, Ukrainian SSR, Soviet Union (now Ukraine)
- Occupations: Lawyer, minority rights activist, politician
- Awards: Badge "Excellent Teacher of Ukraine"; Order of Cultural Merit in the rank of "Knight" (2025)

Aurica Bojescu (born 6 January 1961; Ukrainian: Ауріка Василівна Божеску, romanized: Aurika Vasylivna Bozhesku) is a Ukrainian lawyer, minority rights activist and politician of Romanian ethnicity. She is a representative of the Romanian community in Ukraine, being an advocate for minority rights for the ethnic minorities of the country. Bojescu also contributed to the drafting of the 1996 Constitution of Ukraine, was a member of the Chernivtsi Oblast Council during four legislatures and worked as an assistant for Verkhovna Rada (the Ukrainian parliament) members for over a decade. She is a recipient of the Excellent Teacher badge from Ukraine's education ministry as well as Romania's Order of Cultural Merit.

== Biography ==
Aurica Bojescu was born on 6 January 1961 in the village of Karapchiv (Romanian: Carapciu or Carapciu pe Siret), in the Ukrainian SSR of the Soviet Union (now Ukraine). She is an ethnic Romanian, living in the town of Hlyboka (Adâncata) as of 2026. Having completed a Master of Public Administration, Bojescu is a lawyer, being one of the specialists that participated in the redaction of the 1996 Constitution of Ukraine. Having been elected for four different legislatures, she was a member of the Chernivtsi Oblast Council from 1998 to 2014, serving affiliated to the Party of Regions from 2006 to 2014. From 2006 to 2019, she worked as an assistant consultant for members of the Verkhovna Rada (Ukraine's parliament) from Chernivtsi Oblast's constituencies, having also worked as an assistant for Odesa Oblast parliament member Eduard Matviychuk.

Bojescu is a specialist in the field of education, in particular from the perspective of the national minorities in Ukraine. Having more than 25 years of teaching experience as of 2026, she is a recipient of the Excellent Teacher badge awarded by the Ministry of Education and Science of Ukraine. In 2005, Bojescu published Situația minorităților românești din Ucraina ("Situation of the Romanian Minorities of Ukraine"), a study on the Romanians in Ukraine.

Bojescu has often acted as a representative for the Romanian minority in the region of Northern Bukovina, having represented the Romanian community in Ukraine in negotiations with the Ukrainian education ministry. She has actively protested against the deficient situation regarding the minority rights of the Ukrainian Romanians (including the Ukrainian self-declared Moldovans), particularly in Romanian media. In 2003, Bojescu was elected executive president of the Bukovinian Independent Center for Current Studies. This organization is part of the larger Romanian Community of Ukraine Interregional Union, of which she was elected executive secretary in 2005. The Romanian Community of Ukraine Interregional Union is dedicated to supporting legislation in Ukraine offering proper minority rights to national ethnic minorities.

Bojescu has held the office of deputy chairman of the Council of Representatives of Public Associations of National Minorities and Indigenous Peoples of the education ministry of Ukraine. In 2019, she was one of several participants in a meeting between the Hungarian politician Zsolt Németh and Thorbjørn Jagland, Secretary General of the Council of Europe. Several matters were discussed during the meeting, including the situation of the minority languages of Ukraine. She also met in 2022 with representatives of the Hungarian minority of Ukraine in the headquarters of the Transcarpathian Hungarian Cultural Association (KMKSZ).

Bojescu was awarded the Order of Cultural Merit in the rank of "Knight", in the F Category ("The promotion of culture"), on 6 March 2025 by the President of Romania. She received the award in appreciation of her "important contributions made to the promotion of Romanian language and literature [...] for the preservation of Romanian traditions and civilization and the promotion of Romania's image in Ukraine". Victor Micula, Romania's ambassador to Ukraine, stated that the award was a culmination of her activities carried out over decades. Bojescu and two other Ukrainian Romanian figures (writer and journalist Maria Andrieș and journalist Nicolae Șapcă, for the same reasons) received the award in a ceremony at the National Palace of the Romanians of Chernivtsi.
