= Staryi Vovchynets =

Commune in Chernivtsi Oblast, Ukraine

Staryi Vovchynets Старий Вовчинець Volcineț Старый Волчинец
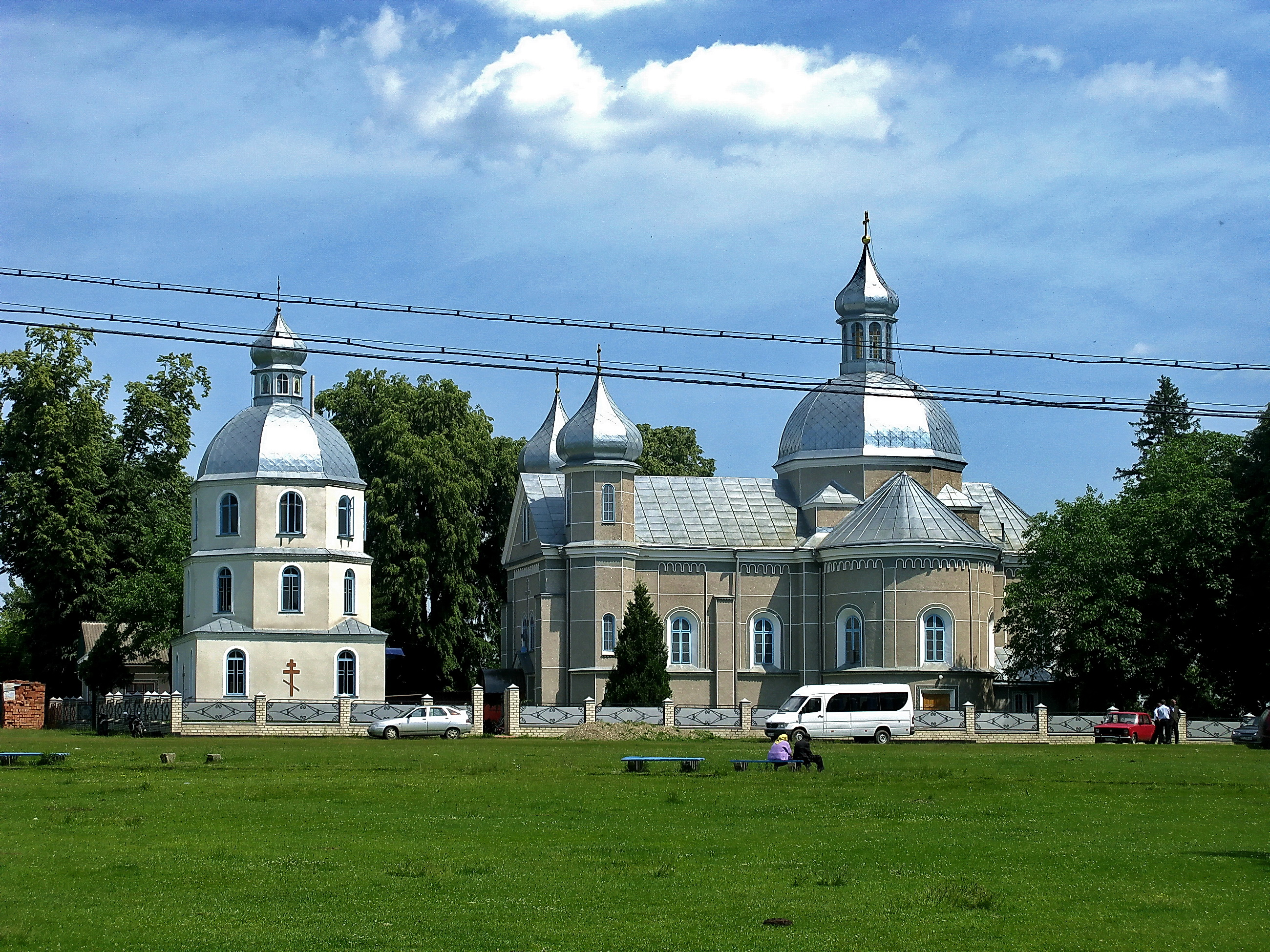
- Church of The Mother of God
- Interactive map of Staryi Vovchynets
- Location within Chernivtsi Oblast Location within Ukraine
- Coordinates: 48°0′18″N 25°56′13″E
- Country: Ukraine
- Oblast: Chernivtsi Oblast
- Raion: Chernivtsi Raion

Population (2001)
  - Total: 2,039
- Time zone: UTC+2 (EET)
  - Summer (DST): UTC+3 (EEST)
- Postal code: 60440
- Area code: +380 3734
- KOATUU: 7321086301
- KATOTTH: UA73060230040055935

Staryi Vovchynets (Ukrainian: Старий Вовчинець; Romanian: Volcineț; German: Wolczynetz) is a village in Chernivtsi Raion, Chernivtsi Oblast, Ukraine. It belongs to Kamianka rural hromada, one of the hromadas of Ukraine. The Staryi Vovchynets village council is the body of the local authority that administers the villages of Stary Vovchynets and Bila Krynytsia (Romanian: Fântâna Albă).

Until 18 July 2020, Staryi Vovchynets belonged to Hlyboka Raion. The raion was abolished in July 2020 as part of the administrative reform of Ukraine, which reduced the number of raions of Chernivtsi Oblast to three. The area of Hlyboka Raion was merged into Chernivtsi Raion.

== Fântâna Albă massacre ==
A massacre took place there on 1 April 1941, when up to 3,000 civilians were killed when their attempt to forcefully cross the border from the Soviet Union to Romania was met with open fire by the Soviet Border Troops. Although according to Soviet official reports no more than 44 civilians were killed, local witnesses assert a much higher toll stating that survivors were tortured, killed, or buried in mass graves. Other survivors were taken away to be tortured and killed at the hands of the NKVD, the Soviet secret police. Some sources refer to this massacre as "the Romanian Katyn". In 2011, the Chamber of Deputies of Romania adopted a law establishing 1 April as the National Day honoring the memory of Romanian victims of massacres at Fântâna Albă, Lunca, and other areas, of deportations, of hunger, and other forms of repression organized by the Soviet regime in Hertsa, northern Bukovina, and Bessarabia.

== Natives ==
- Florea Lupu (1863–1939), Imperial Austrian-born Romanian lawyer and politician
