= Arcadie Suceveanu =

Romanian–Moldovan poet, essayist, translator and journalist

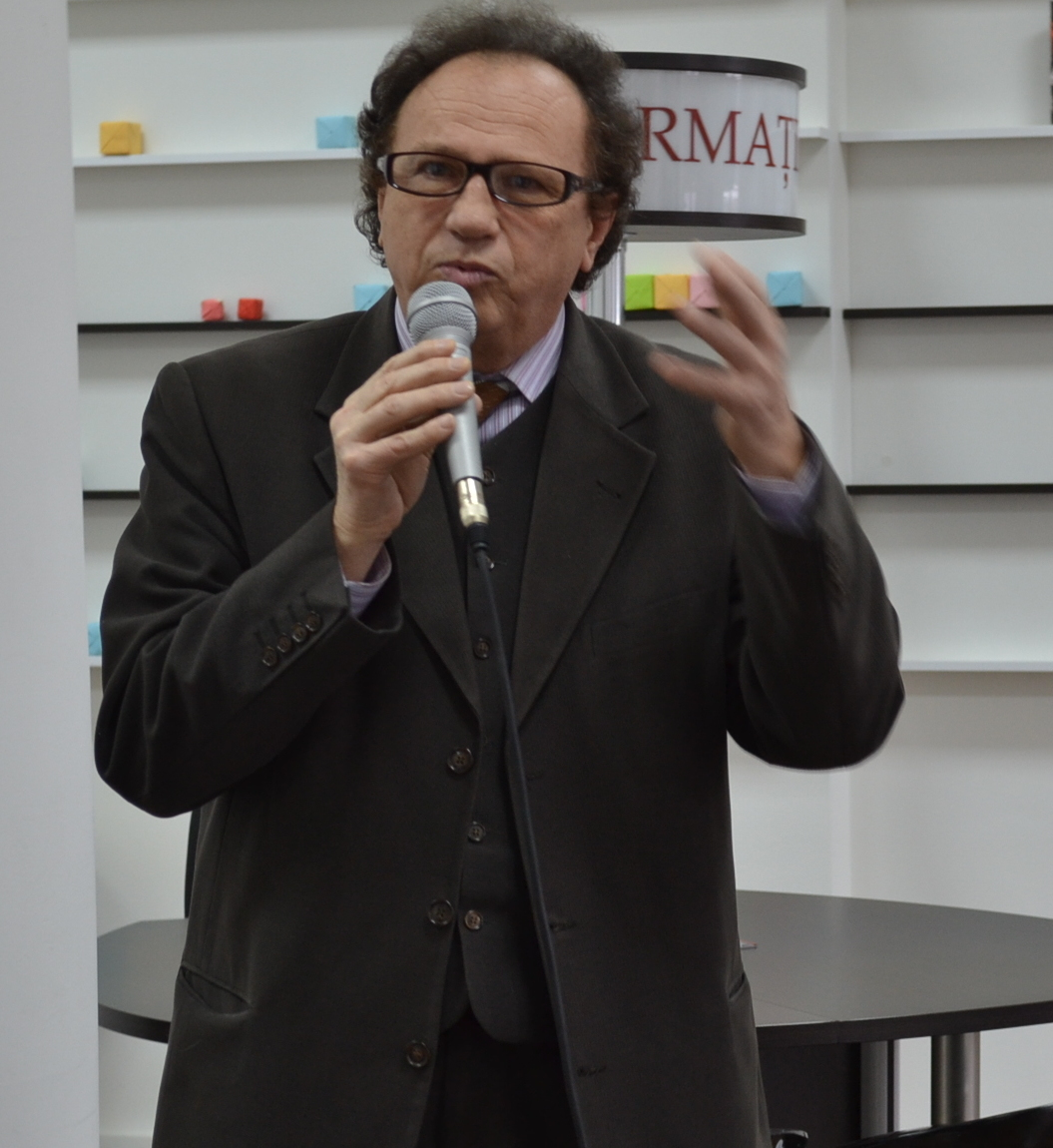
- Suceveanu in 2014
- Born: Arcadie Vasile Suceveanu; 16 November 1952 (age 73); Sucheveny, Soviet Union (now Ukraine)
- Education: Chernivtsi University
- Occupations: Poet, essayist, translator, journalist

Arcadie Vasile Suceveanu (born 16 November 1952) is a Soviet Ukrainian-born Romanian poet, essayist, translator and journalist in Moldova. Suceveanu was born in Sucheveny (Romanian: Suceveni), in the Ukrainian SSR in the Soviet Union (now Ukraine). He completed his secondary education in Karapchiv (Carapciu or Carapciu pe Siret) in 1969, after which he entered Chernivtsi University, studying in the Romanian Language and Literature section of the Faculty of Philology.

Suceveanu debuted as a poet in 1968 in Zorile Bucovinei, a Romanian-language newspaper in Ukraine. He became executive vice president of the Moldovan Writers' Union after 1990, later becoming its president in 2010. He also became secretary and president of the Writers' Union of Romania's branch in Chișinău in 2005. Suceveanu is a founding member of PEN Moldova, the Moldovan branch of PEN International. He has received numerous awards, including an award from the Romanian Academy in 1997, a Moldovan national award in 1998 and numerous awards from the Moldovan Writers' Union in 1987, 1995, 1999, 2000 and 2002.
