= Lunca massacre =

1941 mass shooting by Soviet troops

- Lunca massacre (Ukraine)
- Location: 48°10′50″N 26°19′40″E; Lunca, Ukrainian SSR, Soviet Union (now Lunka, Ukraine)
- Date: 7 February 1941 (CET)
- Target: ethnic Romanians attempting to cross the border from the Soviet Union into Romania
- Victim: Hundreds
- Perpetrator: Soviet Border Troops

Hundreds of civilians (mostly ethnic Romanians) were massacred on 7 February 1941 when Soviet Border troops opened fire on them while they were attempting to forcefully cross the border from the Soviet Union to Romania, near the village of Lunca, now Lunka in Chernivtsi Oblast, Ukraine. Although there are no official statistics, it is estimated that about 600 people were killed.

== Background ==
The division of Bukovina after 28 June 1940

In late June 1940, Romania was forced to withdraw from a territory inhabited by 3.76 million people, submitting to an ultimatum by the Soviet Union. The Romanian administration and military were evacuated, while the Red Army and the NKVD quickly occupied the land. Many families were caught by surprise by the rapid sequence of events, and had members on both sides of the new border. Therefore, many tried to cross the border, with or without official permission. According to official Soviet data, in the area patrolled by the 97th Unit of Soviet Border Troops, 471 people had crossed the border illegally from the districts of Hlyboka, Hertsa, Putila, and Storozhynets. The zone assigned to this unit extended from the border to about 7.5 km (4.7 mi) south of Chernivtsi.

From the more remote areas of Chernivtsi Oblast (the northern portion of the acquired territories that were included in the USSR), such as the districts of Vashkivtsi, Zastavna, Novoselytsia, Sadhora, and Chernivtsi-rural, 628 people crossed the border to find refuge in Romania. This phenomenon cut across all ethnic and social groups in the occupied territories. A Ukrainian scholar estimated the number of refugees to Romania during the first year of Soviet administration at 7,000.

The Soviet authorities' reaction to this phenomenon was twofold. First, border patrol efforts were strengthened. Second, lists were made of families that had one or more members which had fled to Romania, and thus were considered "traitors of the Motherland", therefore subject to labor camp deportation. On 1 January 1941, the lists made by the 97th Unit of the Soviet Border Guards mentioned 1,085 persons. Tables for other localities included names for 1,294 people (on 7 December 1940). At this point, even people who were merely suspected of intending to flee to Romania began to be included.

On 19 November 1940, 40 families (a total of 105 people) from the village of Suceveni, also carrying 20 guns, tried to cross the frontier at Fântâna Albă. At night, a battle ensued with the Soviet border guards, during which three people were killed, two were wounded and captured by the Soviets, while the rest of the group (including five wounded) managed to arrive in Rădăuți, on the other side of the border. However, in short order, the relatives of those 105 people were all arrested and deported to Siberia.

== Massacre ==
In January 1941, over 100 villagers from Mahala, Ostrița, Horecea and other villages successfully crossed the border and arrived in Romania. This gave confidence to other villagers. Consequently, a group of villagers from Mahala, Cotul Ostriței, Buda, Șirăuți, Horecea-Urbana, and Ostrița tried to cross to Romania during the night of 6 February 1941, near the village of Lunca, on the right bank of the river Prut. However, they had been denounced to the authorities and were discovered by the border guards at 06:00. Volleys of machine gun fire from multiple directions resulted in numerous dead (hundreds), including the organizers N. Merticar, N. Nica, and N. Isac. About 57 people managed to reach Romania, but 44 others were arrested and tried as "members of a counter-revolutionary organization".

The exact number of deaths is unknown, but it is estimated that it would be over 600. According to the testimony of Mihai Crăiuț, one of the survivors of the Lunca massacre, approximately 300 young men and boys were buried in three mass graves, not far from the Prut River.

On 14 April 1941, the Kiev Military District Tribunal sentenced 12 of those people to death, while the other 32 were sentenced to ten years forced labor and five years of loss of civic rights each. Petru Grior, director of the Center for Historical and Cultural Research in Chernivtsi, lists the 12 people sentenced to death as Ion Boiciuc, Florea Bujeniță, Ion Cudla, Toader Eremie, Ștefan Guraliuc, Petru Guzma, Grigore Medvidi, Vasile Moraru, Vasile Morărean, Vasile Tihon, Ion Toderean, and Ilie Voronca. All the family members of these "traitors to the Motherland" were also arrested and deported to Siberia.

== Aftermath and larger context ==
This was not the only massacre carried out by the Soviet authorities against the Bessarabian and the Bukovinian Romanians. The most famous is the Fântâna Albă massacre, in which approximately 50-200 Romanians were killed.

During 1940–1941, between 11,000 and 13,000 Bukovinians (mostly, but not only ethnic Romanians) were deported to Siberia and the Gulag, 1,421 of them dying in the camps. As a result of immigration, deportations, and killings, the Romanian population of the Chernivtsi region dropped by more than 75,000 between the Romanian 1930 census and the first Soviet census of 1959. It has been claimed that these persecutions were part of a program of deliberate extermination, planned and executed by the Soviet regime.

After the snow melted, the Prut flooded the area where the dead at Lunca were buried, so that in the summer of 1941, when Romanian troops reoccupied the area, only one mass grave could be found, in which the bodies of 107 victims were discovered. They were exhumed and buried in the cemetery of the village of Mahala.

In 2011, the Chamber of Deputies of Romania adopted a law establishing April 1 as the National Day honoring the memory of Romanian victims of massacres at Lunca, Fântâna Albă, and other areas, of deportations, of hunger, and other forms of repression organized by the Soviet regime in Hertsa, northern Bukovina, and Bessarabia. The massacre is commemorated annually both in Romania and in the Chernivtsi Oblast of Ukraine.

== See also ==
- Fântâna Albă massacre
- List of massacres in the Soviet Union
- Katyn massacre
- Tatarka common graves

== References and sources ==
- (in Romanian) Vasile Ilica, "Martiri și mărturii din nordul Bucovinei (Fântâna Albă-Suceveni-Lunca-Crasna-Ijești...)", Oradea, 2003
- (in Romanian) Vasile Mănescu, "Masacrul de la Fîntîna Albă", Monitorul de Neamț, 4 April 2006
- Popescu, Ion (13 February 2005). "Crearea regiunii Cernăuți". Obsevatorul (in Romanian).
- Târâțeanu, Vasile (May 2007). "Scriitorul nu poate exista în afara cetății (interviu de Emanoil Toma)". Luceafărul Românesc (in Romanian).
- Lenz, Hélène (31 December 2015). "Déportation d'une famille paysanne roumaine en Sibérie (1941–1945)" [Deportation in Siberia of a Rumanian Peasant Family (1941–1945)]. Cahiers balkaniques (in French). 43. doi:10.4000/ceb.8120. ISSN 0290-7402.
