= Korchivtsi =

Commune in Chernivtsi Oblast, Ukraine

Korchivtsi Корчівці
- Village
- Interactive map of Korchivtsi
- Coordinates: 48°00′44″N 25°45′57″E
- Country: Ukraine
- Oblast: Chernivtsi Oblast
- Raion: Chernivtsi Raion
- Hromada: Suchevena rural hromada
- Founded: 1654
- Elevation: 370 m (1,210 ft)

Population
  - Total: 1,733
- Postal code: 60426
- Area code: +380 3734
- KATOTTH: UA73060510020054961

Korchivtsi (Ukrainian: Корчівці; Romanian: Corcești; German: Korczestie) is a commune (selsoviet) in Chernivtsi Raion, Chernivtsi Oblast, Ukraine. It is composed of a single village, Korchivtsi. It belongs to Sucheveny rural hromada, one of the hromadas of Ukraine.

Until 18 July 2020, Korchivtsi belonged to Hlyboka Raion. The raion was abolished in July 2020 as part of the administrative reform of Ukraine, which reduced the number of raions of Chernivtsi Oblast to three. The area of Hlyboka Raion was merged into Chernivtsi Raion. In 2001, 66.59% of the inhabitants spoke Ukrainian as their native language, while 32.2% spoke Romanian.

== Name ==
The village's name is Korchivtsi, but at various times under different authorities it was called Korcheşti, Korchovtsi and Korchevtsy. The published results of the Austro-Hungarian censuses of 1900 and 1910 give three names for the village, in this order: Korczestie in German (the state language), Korcziwci in Ukrainian (the main language of the village), and Corcesti in Romanian (the language of the then authorities of Bukovina).

Opinions differ on the origin of the name. Most believe it comes from the name of the river Korchiaska, which in turn is linked to the many tree stumps (korchi) on its bank. H. Kramariuk, in his monograph, connects the name with the Romanian boyar Simicorci, who owned the village of Korcheşti on the Cozanţa and, in his view, gave it its name. However, there is irrefutable evidence that even Korcheşti on the Cozanţa bore this name before it passed into Simicorci's ownership. A charter of the Moldavian ruler Alexander, who reigned in 1399–1432, records the gift of the village of Korcheşti on the Cozanţa by the logofăt Toder Boboioh to Humor Monastery. Only later did it pass into Simicorci's ownership.

== Geography ==
The river Korcheshka, a right tributary of the Mali Seret, flows through the village. To the south lies the Petrivtsi Nature Reserve, and to the southeast the botanical natural monument "Berna".

As of 1 January 2017, the territory within the village's boundaries is 4,141 hectares, of which 665 hectares are purely land under roads, buildings and household plots. As of 31 December 1900, by contrast, the village's territory was recorded as 1,052 hectares: 696 ha of arable land, 719 ha of forest, 195 ha of meadows and 131 ha of pastures, slopes and ravines. According to preliminary data, the large increase occurred in the 1950s during the administrative-territorial reform carried out by the Soviet authorities. In particular, the so-called "Petrivske", the slope from the road down to the river (shown on the map as Pereuts, and now forming the boundary between Korchivtsi and Nyzhni Petrivtsi in Storozhynets Raion), was legally included in Korchivtsi. In addition, half of a field (lan) was officially assigned to Korchivtsi.

The history of how Korchivtsi's boundaries were formed still needs to be studied, as only fragmentary data have been obtained. H. Kramariuk, in his monograph on the village's history, mentions an attempt by the Austrian authorities on 15 October 1762 to establish the boundaries of the villages of Kupka, Korchivtsi and Petrivtsi. He records: "One of the elder peasants, 70-year-old Ilie Tarițe from Kupka, testified that he knew where the old boundaries between these two villages ran (meaning Kupka and Petrivtsi — note by the authors) and led the said gentlemen to the place where two high burial mounds stood, declaring that the boundary between Kupka and Korcheşti ran right here. Then he showed the old boundary of Petrivtsi, which ran along the 'Cossack Glade' and the 'commons'." It has not yet been possible to establish where the Cossack Glade and the commons were. Apparently, part of the present boundary between Kupka and Korchivtsi, on land on the right side of the Korchiaska, has remained as it was in the 18th century — between two high mounds.

Part of the forest belonging to the village territory lies within the Petrivtsi Nature Reserve, a landscape reserve of national significance in the southwest of Hlyboka Raion, south of Korchivtsi. It covers 170 ha and was established in 1983.

== Population ==
The village has a mixed ethnic composition, though the question is highly debatable. At the beginning of the 21st century Romanians formally predominate, because during the period of Romanian rule in 1918–1940 the authorities forcibly registered everyone as Romanian. But, as the documents of the official Austro-Hungarian census of December 1900 show, more than 1,095 villagers identified as Ukrainians and only 153 as Romanians, with another 62 being Germans and Jews.[1] The surnames of most native residents are Ukrainian: Tkachuk, Savchuk, Shpak, Kramariuk, Berezovskyi, Hutsuliak, Dzhuriuk, Kozachuk, Chykivchuk, Druchuk, Kostiuk, Bodnariuk, Duhan, Belmeha, Vintoniak, Ovachuk, and so on. Such surnames are characteristic of the Bukovinian Carpathians, Pokuttia and Podillia.

Historians have noted a phenomenon that occurred with three Bukovinian villages that were regarded as Ukrainian before the First World War and as Romanian after the Second World War. Korchivtsi is among them. Scholars explain it by the fact that the residents of these villages had suffered serious repression from the Romanian authorities because of their nationality and, after the village was incorporated into the USSR, believing that the Romanians might return, chose to remain within the conditions laid down by Romania. One should also not ignore the fact that in the second half of the 20th century there was an active outflow of young people from the village, since study in a Ukrainian school gave children from Korchivtsi better chances to get an education and a profession and settle in cities than children from the surrounding Romanian villages had. And in place of the young people who built their lives outside the village came young people from Kupka and Petrivtsi, who married among themselves.

== Education ==
The Korchivtsi elementary public school (Volksschule) was founded on 19 October 1884 by decision No. 1458 of the administration of the Bukovinian regional education authority. Its opening was connected with the implementation of the Austrian (14 May 1869) and Bukovinian (30 January 1873) education laws, which made elementary education compulsory for children aged 7 to 13. Parents whose children avoided school were punished with fines and arrest.

In October 1884 there was no dedicated building for the school in Korchivtsi, so at first it was housed in a private home. Soon, at the community's expense, construction of a separate school building began and was completed in 1887: a one-storey wooden building in the centre of the village, by the road, on the site where the school garden is today. Instruction officially began on 1 September 1887. Among the first teachers were Dmytro Tkachuk, Yevhen Yakubovskyi and Volodymyr Iliuk. The population received the school's opening without much enthusiasm. Moreover, despite compulsory education, at first it was attended by no more than 2–3 pupils.

Things changed only after Vasyl Zavaduk, a qualified teacher and organizer, was appointed director in 1889. In 1889–1890 the school was already attended by 57 children, and the number grew each following year. According to official statistics, as of July 1894 there were 181 school-age children living in Korchivtsi.

The director at that time was Stepan Sorochan. Each year the number of residents grew, and with it the number of pupils, so a new school became necessary. As early as March 1905, some villagers appealed to the authorities to allocate a plot of land and funds and begin building a new school.

In 1907 two separate schools began operating in Korchivtsi: a Ukrainian one (director Orest Kaziievych, teachers Dmytro Antoniuk and Sydir Semaka) and a Romanian one (director Hryhorii Isar, teachers Teodor Tkachuk and Ivan Onchul). Teaching in both followed a single scheme, with a five-year course. The subjects were German, Ukrainian language and literature (in the Romanian school, Romanian language and literature), mathematics, geography, history, religion, singing and handicrafts. One teacher taught all subjects in a given class. The Ukrainian school had certain problems, especially while Orest Kaziievych was director (1907–1911).

The situation improved with the appointment of Danylo Kharoviuk as director of the Ukrainian school in February 1911. His wife Iryna also worked there as a teacher. During their time, the authority of the Ukrainian school was raised to a proper level, and many varied patriotic events were held with their participation.

On 14 October 1916, D. Kharoviuk died at the age of 32 in a military hospital in the town of Telyn in Silesia (then Czechoslovakia).

In the second half of 1914 the First World War disrupted the measured rhythm of village life. A significant part of the adult male population was mobilized, and school attendance and pupils' diligence dropped sharply. In November 1918 Bukovina came under the rule of the Kingdom of Romania.

In 1932 a school building was erected in which pupils studied for 60 years. Witnesses of its opening remember that a wreath of linden was made with an inscription of the year of construction. In the post-war years teachers came to the village "from Ukraine," as people said then. They started families, raised children, and the village became home to them: Halyna Ilarionivna Bohova, Kateryna Vasylivna Blysenko, Vira Ivanivna Poperechna and Mariia Trokhymivna Karpiak. They first taught the children to speak Ukrainian, giving them their intellect, heart, thought and health.

The present school building was erected in 1992 by builders of the Hlyboka inter-collective-farm construction organization, with much work contributed by the school director, teachers, parents and children. On 31 August the school grounds were filled with villagers, children and guests, and the new building drew admiration.

In the 2019–2020 school year the school has 309 pupils in 14 classes: 127 pupils in grades 1–4 and 182 in grades 5–11.

== History ==
The village of Korchivtsi in the Hlyboka area lies on the border between Northern and Southern Bukovina. On 22–23 March 1654 the ruler of Moldavia, Gheorghe Ştefan, issued a deed of ownership for Dragomirna Monastery. Among other villages, it mentions Korchivtsi. From these dates onward, present-day Korchivtsi appears in historical documents as a separate village. The deed was issued because all earlier deeds attesting ownership, sale, purchase and donation had been destroyed during the military campaigns of the Cossack-Moldavian army of Voivode Vasile Lupu and acting hetman Tymish Khmelnytskyi against the claimant to the Moldavian throne Gheorghe Ştefan and the Wallachian troops of ruler Matei Basarab, supported by Transylvanian, Polish and Serbian mercenaries.

There is an erroneous conclusion about the first mention of the village. The History of Towns and Villages of the Ukrainian SSR (Kyiv, 1969) states that the village was supposedly first mentioned in historical documents in 1462. The mistake traces to a note compiled in 1965 by three local activists of the time, who referred to a native of the village, Gheorghe Kramariuk, but either misunderstood or distorted his conclusions. In his monograph on the village's history, Kramariuk describes how the ruler of Moldavia, Stephen the Great, in 1462 gave the boyar Simicorci the village of "Korcheşti pe Cozanţa" (Korchivtsi on the Cozanţa river). The monograph also describes how this village passed to Simicorci's descendants, was then sold to the landowner Toader, and in 1539 was donated by him to Humor Monastery.

But Kramariuk convincingly proves that these events concerned not the village of Korchivtsi (which at that time was called "Korcheşti pe Korcheska", Korchivtsi on the Korcheska river), but an entirely different settlement, "Korcheşti pe Cozanţa". The latter was located in Botoşani County, on the Cozanţa river, in the commune of Gârgăț, not far from the villages of Albești, Soldănești, Stănești and Slatina. Other historical documents confirm this.

Thus the first currently known written mention of Korchivtsi dates from 22–23 March 1654.

Life was already bustling on the village's territory earlier, and many events took place. This is evidenced, in particular, by the remains of a fortress and settlement (a hillfort) on its territory, established during the 1st millennium AD. It lies seven kilometres southwest of the village centre, in a forest, on a promontory, in the Chytate tract. Its platform measures 300 by 300 metres and is bounded by a rampart on the land side. South of the hillfort is a group of burial mounds.

Aerospace imaging of the oblast revealed an archaeoastronomical object: an earthen observatory in the primeval forest near Korchivtsi, which was discussed at the scientific conference "Exploring the Universe: Past, Present, Future" held in Chernivtsi in November 2011. These sites still await study.

It is known that both in 1654 and during the following 130 years the village was uninhabited. This requires further research to establish where the people who had lived there went; an uninhabited place could hardly have been given village status, which is further confirmation that people lived on the territory long before the first written mention. Archival documents from 1762 and 1774 note that Korchivtsi's lands were used as pasture and leased by the brothers Luka and Heorhii, natives of Galicia, Armenian by nationality and Catholic by religion. There was no permanent population at that time. The 1783 record of monastery holdings also states that Korchivtsi's lands belonged to Dragomirna Monastery, were independent, brought an annual income of 100 florins, and were leased by Lorzei Codrescu, a native of Rădăuți.

The Austrian authorities took active measures to settle Korchivtsi. First it was proposed that Lipovans (Russian Old Believers, as they are called here) settle there. After inspecting the area on 22 April 1784 they refused, because the land was hilly, covered with forest and bushes, and therefore unsuitable for cultivation. They went on to found the present village of Bila Krynytsia in another place, called Varnytsia. In March 1785 the Bukovinian administration proposed that 18 families of Rusyns (Ukrainians), who had settled a year earlier in Bălcăuți (now a village in Suceava County, Romania), move to Korchivtsi. There is evidence that they too refused, but it is likely that these Slavic families became the first permanent settlers.

This is supported by the record of church property registration compiled by Bishop of Bukovina Dolişco and considered by Emperor Joseph II on 29 April 1786, which states that 75 families and one priest, Petro Ioanovych, lived in Kupka and Korchivtsi. The separate number of families in each village is not given, but according to official data 59 families lived in Kupka in 1784. It follows that during 1785, 17–18 families settled in Korchivtsi and attended church in Kupka, which led the author of the record to list Korchivtsi as an appendage of Kupka.

However, as early as 1807 the residents of Korchivtsi built their own church, consecrated on 1 January 1808. Built to an original design and beautifully decorated in the style of Ukrainian (Cossack) Baroque, the wooden church has survived to the present day. The church in the village was always purely Orthodox. This may indicate that the settlers were not, after all, Galicians, at least in the main, since Galicia had by then lived for more than a hundred years under the Union of Brest and its inhabitants were Greek Catholics. The question of conversion to Greek Catholicism never arose in the village, although in the early 19th century the Austrian authorities encouraged it and there were such churches in Chernivtsi. As the population grew over the last hundred years, the small church could no longer meet the community's needs, so in 1992–1993 construction of a new church, also of St. Basil, was begun; it was completed in 1996. Villagers still preserve the memory of their old church.

As a result of research, it was possible to find the results of the 5 latest censuses conducted in Austria-Hungary.

According to official data from the census conducted by the Austro-Hungarian government in 1869, the village had 996 residents and 223 households. As of 31 December 1880 the population was 973, grouped into 262 households. The 1890 census recorded 1,126 residents and 253 households. The 1900 census is given above. The next census was conducted by the Austrian authorities in December 1910, and as of 31 December of that year 1,470 people lived in the village.

Over four decades the population thus grew by almost 500. A review of church registers shows that in 1890–1900 an average of 45–47 children were born in the village each year, while fewer people died, yet one cannot speak of natural increase. An analysis of documents in the Chernivtsi regional archive showed that many new surnames characteristic of the Bukovinian Carpathians appeared in the village in this period, which may indicate that the growth was largely the result of migration of Hutsuls.

== Memorable dates and holidays ==
14 January — the church feast in honour of the consecration of the Church of St. Basil the Great on 14 January 1808.

Green Holidays (Pentecost) — the feast of the church established in the 1930s at the consecration of the new school.

22 March — the day of the first written mention of the village.

19 October — the day the school in the village was founded.

These dates are confirmed primarily by the monographs of a native of Korchivtsi, Gheorghe Kramariuk, a former member of the Supreme Court of the Kingdom of Romania: From Bukovinian Villages: "Korchivtsi of Storozhynets County" (1931) and The Church in Korchivtsi (1939), as well as by archival documents of the regional state archive, data from the digital library of Upper Austria, and the recollections of the village's long-lived residents.

== Notable natives ==
Heorhii Vasylovych Berezovskyi — Hero of Ukraine. Born 6 February 1935 in Korchivtsi (now in Hlyboka Raion). Director of the Storozhynets agricultural cooperative "Kolos." Deputy of five convocations of the Chernivtsi Oblast council and of 28 convocations of village and district councils. For his work in production and for charitable activity he was awarded the Order "For Merit" 3rd class and the "Badge of Honour"; certificates of honour from the Verkhovna Rada and the Cabinet of Ministers of Ukraine; the jubilee medal "For Valiant Labour"; the certificate of honour "For Services to the Ukrainian People"; and the honorary distinction "Bukovyna." On 21 August 2007 President Viktor Yushchenko signed a decree conferring on him the title "Hero of Ukraine" with the Order of the State. He died in January 2025 in Storozhynets and is buried in Korchivtsi beside his parents.

== Sources ==
- H. Kramariuk, About Bukovinian Villages: The Village of Korcheşti. Bucharest, 1931.
- H. Kramariuk, The Church in Korcheşti. Bucharest, 1939.
- Königreiche und Länder. Vienna, 1882. Upper Austria State Library (archived 15 July 2017, Wayback Machine).
- Alphabetisches Namensverzeichnis. Vienna, 1915. Upper Austria State Library (archived 15 July 2017, Wayback Machine).
- Website of Korchivtsi secondary school.

== Notes ==
1. Gemeindelexikon der im Reichsrate vertretenen Königreiche und Länder, bearbeitet auf Grund der Ergebnisse der Volkszählung vom 31. Dezember 1900, XIII. Bukowina. Vienna (online).
