= Zorile Bucovinei =

Romanian newspaper in Ukraine

- Editor-in-chief: Nicolae Toma
- Founded: 1941
- Language: Romanian
- Headquarters: Chernivtsi
- Website: Official website

Zorile Bucovinei ("Bukovina's Sunrises" in Romanian; Ukrainian Cyrillic: Зоріле Буковінєй) is a Romanian-language newspaper published in Chernivtsi (Cernăuți), Ukraine. It is one of the oldest Romanian publications in Chernivtsi Oblast.

Its first issue was published on 15 February 1941 in the Ukrainian language. The newspaper's first Romanian-language issue was published on 1 April 1967, "in good time" as an editorial note said. As of 11 December 2018, the newspaper was publishing its issue number 14,563 and employed only six journalists. These included the decades-long editor-in-chief Nicolae Toma, his wife Felicia and their daughter Diana.

In 2016, the newspaper celebrated the 75th anniversary of its founding. The entire diplomatic corps of the Romanian consulate general in Chernivtsi participated in the event, including consul general Eleonora Moldovan. Leaders of Romanian cultural associations, writers, priests and other Romanian cultural figures also participated. The newspaper has also organized celebrations to commemorate Bukovina Day. This holiday takes place every 28 November and celebrates the 1918 unification of Bukovina with Romania.

Among the people who have written for the newspaper are the journalist, poet and translator Ion Chilaru, the historian, poet and writer Dumitru Covalciuc, the activist and poet Simion Gociu, the writer and publicist Ilie Motrescu, the translator and writer Vlad Pohilă, the poet, essayist, translator and journalist Arcadie Suceveanu and the activist and poet Vasile Tărâțeanu.

== See also ==
- List of newspapers in Ukraine
