= Krasnoilsk =

Rural locality in Chernivtsi Oblast, Ukraine

Krasnoilsk Красноїльськ Crasna / Crasna-Ilschi
- Rural settlement
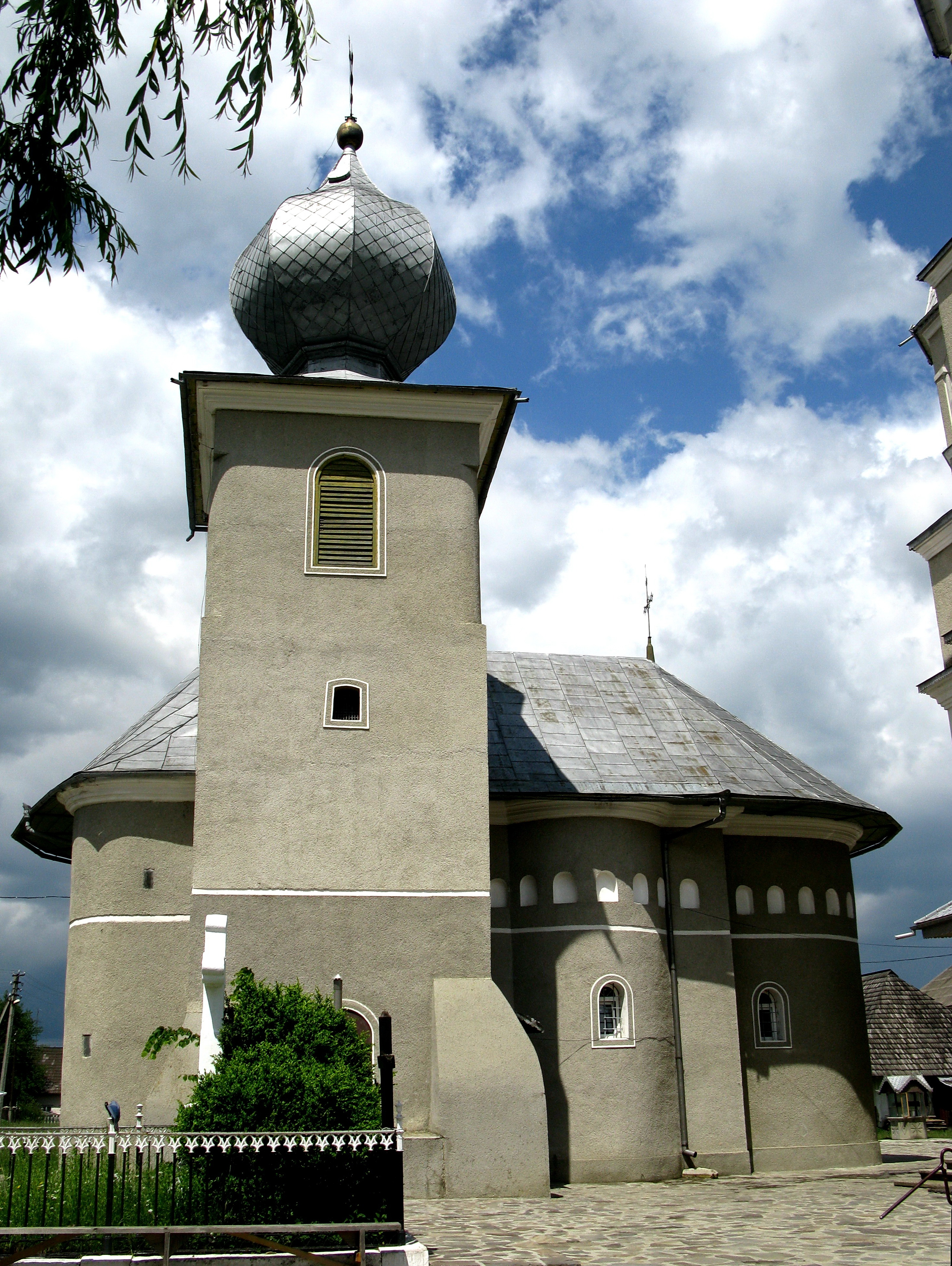
- Church of St. John the Baptist, built in 1792 by the Moldavian boyar Alexandru Ilschi

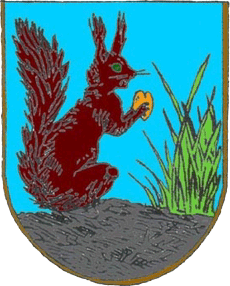
- Coat of arms
- Interactive map of Krasnoilsk
- Location of Krasnoilsk Krasnoilsk (Ukraine)
- Coordinates: 48°00′53″N 25°35′14″E
- Country: Ukraine
- Oblast: Chernivtsi Oblast
- Raion: Chernivtsi Raion
- Hromada: Krasnoilsk settlement hromada
- First mentioned: 1431
- Urban status since: 1968

Government
  - Type: Mayor-council government
  - Mayor: Taras Ionescu
- Elevation: 409 m (1,342 ft)

Population (2022)
  - Total: 10,444
- Time zone: UTC+2 (EET)
  - Summer (DST): UTC+3 (EEST)
- Postal code: 59022
- Area code: +380 3735
- KOATUU: 7324555400

Krasnoilsk (Ukrainian: Красноїльськ; Romanian: Crasna or Crasna-Ilschi; German: Krasnojilsk or Krasna Ilski or Krasna Putna) is a rural settlement in Chernivtsi Raion, Chernivtsi Oblast, western Ukraine. It hosts the administration of Krasnoilsk settlement hromada, one of the hromadas of Ukraine. Population: 10,444 (2022 estimate).

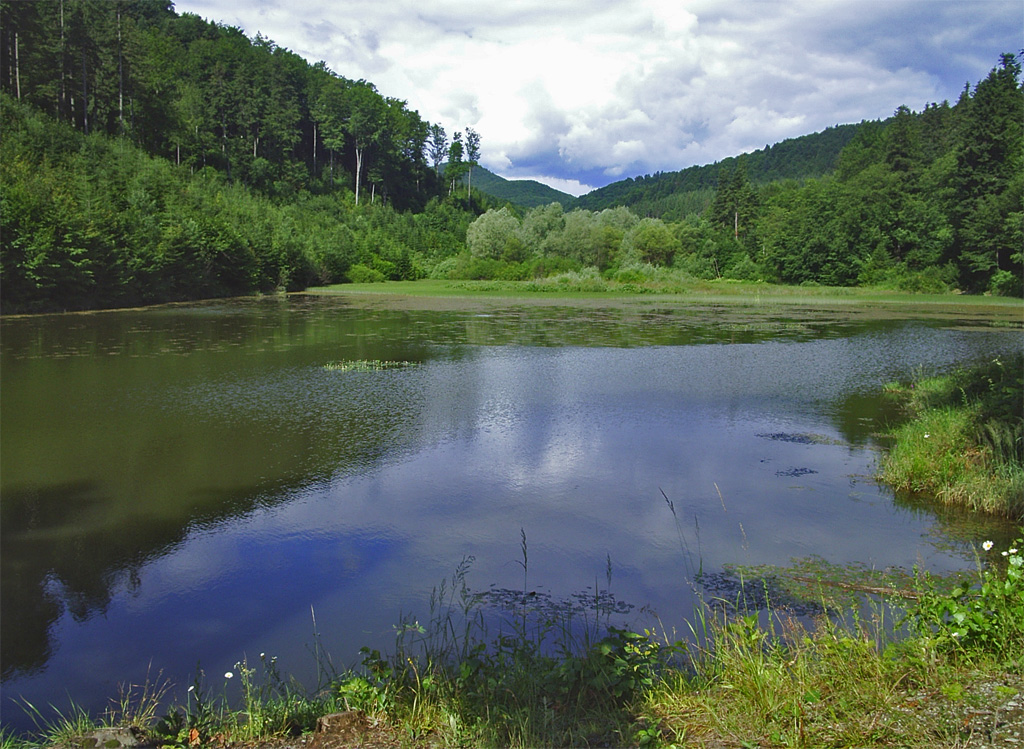
A landscape near Krasnoilsk

Krasnoilsk is located 8 kilometres (5 mi) from the Ukrainian border with Romania and according to the 2001 Ukrainian census, the settlement had 9,122 people, out of which almost all are ethnic Romanians. According to the 2001 Ukrainian census, the majority of the population of the urban settlement of Krasnoilsk was Romanian -speaking (92.64%), with Ukrainian (5.49%) and Russian (1.45%) speakers in the minority.

== History ==
Starting in 1968, Krasnoilsk was designated an urban-type settlement.

Until 18 July 2020, Krasnoilsk belonged to Storozhynets Raion. The raion was abolished in July 2020 as part of the administrative reform of Ukraine, which reduced the number of raions of Chernivtsi Oblast to three. The area of Storozhynets Raion was merged into Chernivtsi Raion.

On 26 January 2024, a new law entered into force which abolished the status of urban-type settlement for the locality, and Krasnoilsk became a rural settlement.

== Culture ==
The settlement is known for its traditional Malanka celebrations, which attract numerous tourists.

== Notable people ==
- Maria Iliuț (born 1955), Moldovan singer of Romanian folk music
- Ilie Motrescu (1941–1969), Romanian writer and publicist
- Vera Atkins (1908-2000), Romanian-born British intelligence officer
