= Bila Krynytsia =

Bila Krynytsia (Ukrainian: Біла Криниця) is an inhabited locality in Ukraine and it may stand for:

== Urban-type settlements ==
- Bila Krynytsia in Kherson Oblast, Velyka Oleksandrivka Raion
- Bila Krynytsia in Zhytomyr Oblast, Radomyshl Raion

== Villages ==
- Bila Krynytsia, Chernivtsi Oblast in Chernivtsi Oblast, Hlyboka Raion
- Bila Krynytsia, Mykolaiv Oblast in Mykolaiv Oblast, Bereznehuvate Raion
- Bila Krynytsia, Rivne Oblast in Rivne Oblast, Rivne Raion
- Bila Krynytsia, Ternopil Oblast in Ternopil Oblast, Kremenets Raion
