= Verkhni Synivtsi =

Village in Chernivtsi Oblast, Ukraine

- Village
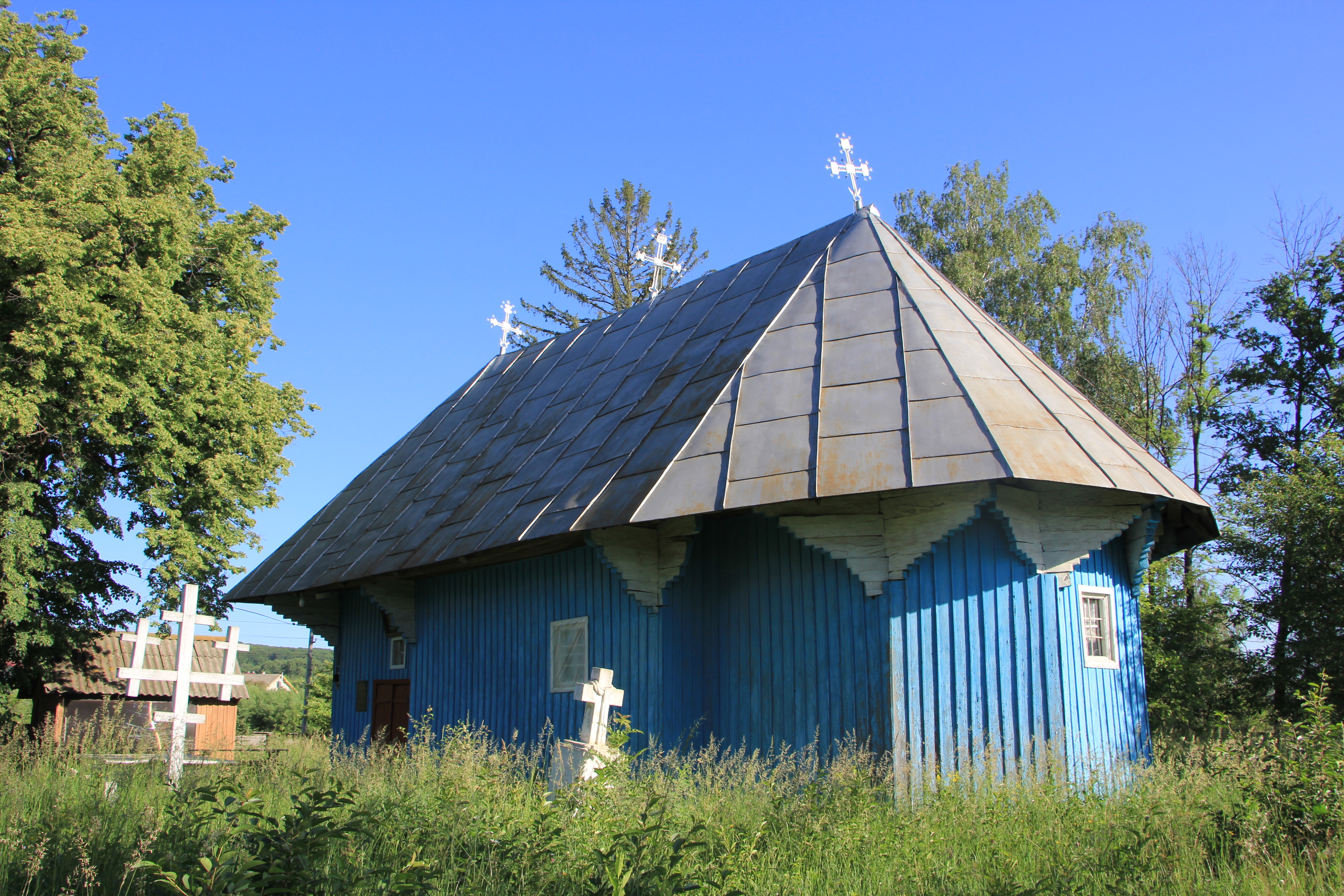
- Wooden church of the Holy Cross (1790)

- Location in Ukraine Verkhni Synivtsi (Chernivtsi Oblast)
- Coordinates: 48°01′12″N 26°06′36″E
- Country: Ukraine
- Oblasts: Chernivtsi Oblast
- Raion: Chernivtsi Raion
- Time zone: UTC+2 (EET)
  - Summer (DST): UTC+3 (EEST)

Verkhni Synivtsi (Ukrainian: Верхні Синівці; Romanian: Sinăuții de Sus; German: Ober Synoutz) is a village in Chernivtsi Raion, Chernivtsi Oblast, Ukraine.

It is composed of two villages, Verkhni Synivtsi and Nyzhni Synivtsi (Ukrainian: Нижні Синівці; Romanian: Sinăuții de Jos; German: Unter Synoutz). It belongs to Terebleche rural hromada, one of the hromadas of Ukraine.

Until 18 July 2020, Verkhni Synivtsi belonged to Hlyboka Raion. The raion was abolished in July 2020 as part of the administrative reform of Ukraine, which reduced the number of raions of Chernivtsi Oblast to three. The area of Hlyboka Raion was merged into Chernivtsi Raion. In 2001, 94.36% of the inhabitants spoke Romanian as their native language, while 5.64% spoke Ukrainian.

== Notable people ==
- Vasile Tărâțeanu (1945–2022), Ukrainian Romanian writer and activist
