= Maria Iliuț =

Moldovan folk singer (born 1955)

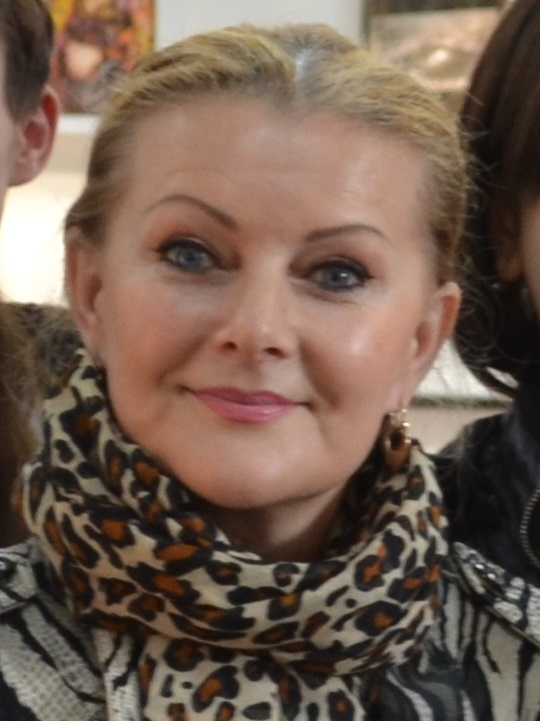
- Iliuț in a group photo
- Born: 23 February 1955 (age 71); Krasnoilsk, Ukrainian SSR, Soviet Union
- Occupation: Singer
- Musical career
- Genres: Muzică populară

Maria Iliuț (born 23 February 1955) is a Moldovan singer of muzică populară.

== Early life and education ==
As a child, Iliuț used to go grazing with cattle and sheep. She dreamed of becoming a dancer. She entered the dance department of the College of Cultural Enlightenment in Chernivtsi, but soon transferred to the department of folk instruments. She attended the Institute of Arts "Gavriil Musicescu" (today Academia de Muzică, Teatru şi Arte Plastice) in Chișinău with a focus on choral conducting and singing.

== Career ==
During her studies, Iliuț was discovered by ethnomusicologist Andrei Tamazlâcaru. Since 1983, she has been a soloist in the ethnofolk ensemble "Tălăncuța", and Chișinău-based bands "Ștefan Vodă" and "Busuioc moldovenesc". Since 1987, she has been a professor at the Children's Creation Palace in Chișinău, and more recently is a senior lecturer at the Faculty of Fine Arts of Moldova State University. Iliuț collaborated with Mihai Amihalachioaie, Gheorghe Banariuc, Petre Neamțu, Nelu Laiu and other musicians. She recorded several folk songs on Radio Moldova, such as Scumpa mea și a noastră fată, Iertăciune, Bătuta ca la Crasna, Bătrâneasca, Busuioace nu te-i coace, Cântă, cuce, că ți-i bine, Pierderea ciobănașului, Sus pe munte cade bruma, Doamne, doamne, greu e dorul, Mamă, câte fete ai, etc.

Iliuț won the Festival-International Competition of Romanian Singers Everywhere in Drobeta-Turnu Severin (1989), the "Sing with Us" contest in Chișinău (1989), the National Folk Festival "Sitting" in Fălticeni (1992) and the Festival Concurs Internațional al Cântecului Păstoresc in Târgoviște with the song "Miorița" (1996). She has undertaken several tours abroad. She was also awarded the Diploma of the Ministry of Education of the Republic of Moldova and the Diploma of Excellence of the Consulate General of Romania in Chernivtsi. She is a member of the Union of Musicians of Moldova and of the Bucharest-Chisinau Cultural Society.

== Personal life ==
Iliuț married instrumentalist Pavel Tamazlâcaru at the age of 24, but divorced after 3 years. She has a son, Marin and is a grandmother.

== Discography ==
- Numai cânt și dor de Bucovina (2004)
