= Maximilian Hacman =

Romanian jurist (1877-1961)

Maximilian Hacman (August 25 [O.S. August 13] 1877 – October 11, 1961) was an Austro-Hungarian-born Romanian jurist.

== Biography ==
=== Early life and Bukovina union role ===
Born in Oprișeni, in Austrian-ruled Bukovina, his uncle was Romanian Orthodox metropolitan Eugenie Hacman, while his father Vasile served as the village priest from 1857 to 1879. After attending primary school in Oprișeni, he went to high school in Czernowitz (Cernăuți). He then enrolled in Czernowitz University, studying at the law faculty and becoming a jurist specialized in commercial and trade law. He took his doctorate in 1904 and, esteemed by his professors, was sent to complete his studies at Berlin and Zurich from 1909 to 1910.

Becoming a political activist on behalf of the region's Romanians, he entered Societatea Academică Junimea and served as its president in 1901. After returning home from Berlin, he continued his involvement with Romanian organizations, holding conferences on various topics. The first of these came in 1911, when Hacman addressed the subject of the family among early Romanians from a juridical standpoint. During this period, he began writing for Călindarul Bucovinei.

Near the end of World War I, Hacman became involved in efforts to join Bukovina with the Romanian Old Kingdom. He was one of fourteen founders and five editors of the pro-union organ Glasul Bucovinei, led by Sextil Pușcariu, and co-signed a programmatic article that appeared in the first number on October 22, 1918. Joining the Romanian National Council, he attended the general congress of Bukovina and, on November 28, voted for union with Romania. Subsequently, within the provisional government, he led the secretariat for commerce and industry. In 1921, on an interim basis, he headed the internal affairs secretariat; a year later, he became general director of the entire department. In September 1919, after being invited by Ion Nistor, he joined the Democratic Union Party. During this period, in his personal papers, he expressed discontent with the heavy-handed approach toward administrative standardization being taken by the central authorities in Bucharest.

=== Interwar activities ===
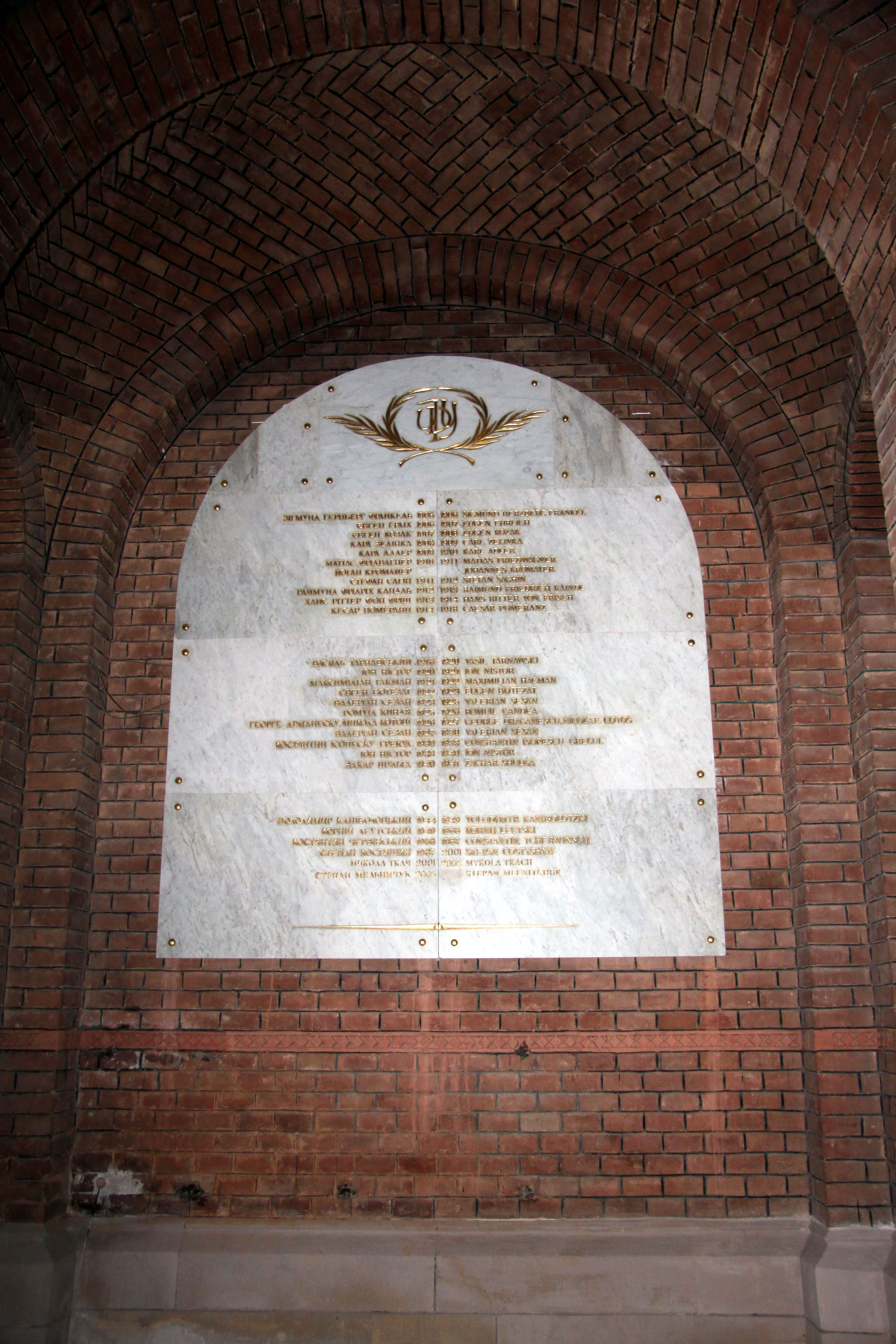
Plaque dedicated to the rectors of the University of Chernivtsi, also mentioning Maximilian Hacman

In 1919, Hacman became a professor at the Cernăuți law faculty, and in this capacity laid the foundations for a commercial studies academy in 1920. He was faculty dean in 1919-1921 and university rector for 1921-1922. A member of the university senate, he was elected to the city's chamber of commerce and industry in 1925. An admirer of German order, he published numerous articles and studies referencing German law. His interests included public and private international law, commercial and trade law; his writings appeared in several important Romanian reviews. He was made a commander of the Order of the Crown and of the Order of the Star of Romania. The vice president of the Bukovina society for Romanian culture and literature, he and took part in numerous activities undertaken by the society at the university. He was involved with the 1922 transformation of the local German theatre into a National Theatre. He authored several books: Reforma studiului de drept (1921), Tratat elementar de drept cambial. Manual (1921), Drept internațional public și privat (1924), Drept comercial comparat (vol. I-II, 1930-1932) and Tratat de drept internațional public și privat (1935).

Following Nistor's lead, Hacman was involved with the university's Romanianization, which he considered "a necessity of major national importance". He objected to the nomination of German speaker Eugen Ehrlich as law professor, claiming this would "profoundly disparage" the university's "prestige, autonomy and national character". His role in integrating new professors did not account for the university's traditions, and, as his interests dictated, was carried out using both old Austrian legislation and Romanian law, which had not yet been extended to the province. He advocated for legal unification and liquidating the last vestiges of the Austrian academic tradition. Privately, however, he lamented the extremely rapid introduction of Romanian law by decree and without accounting for local circumstances.

=== Soviet occupation and aftermath ===
In 1940, during the Soviet occupation of Bukovina, Hacman fled into unoccupied Romania with his papers, which eventually ended up at the Iași chapter of the National Archives. Initially staying with his wife's parents in Focșani, he then moved to Bucharest, where he was a member of the inter-university council. As a member of the Senate for the sole ruling party, the Party of the Nation, and representative for Bukovina, he advocated for a declaration expressing the country's willingness to fight and regain the occupied territories. He addressed a petition to King Carol II expressing the inhabitants' outrage over the occupation. Meanwhile, he took part in the final operations of the Cernăuți law faculty, which had taken refuge at Bucharest. In autumn, he obtained approval from Education Minister Traian Brăileanu, himself a Bukovina refugee, for himself and his former colleagues to transfer to the law faculty of the University of Bucharest.

In October 1940, he accompanied Pușcariu to Berlin, in Nazi Germany, where the latter headed the recently founded Romanian Institute. Working there until July 1941, Hacman was responsible for advising Romanian students and maintaining relations with German universities. After Romania regained control of Northern Bukovina in 1941, he returned there and held numerous conferences under the cultural society's auspices. He was society president in 1943-1944, but then had to seek refuge a second time when the Soviets retook the area. Having found a home in Turda, he founded and became the first president of the association of refugees from Moldavia, Bukovina and Bessarabia in July 1944. After World War II, he retired from public life and died in Turda in 1961.
