= Molnytsia =

Commune in Chernivtsi Oblast, Ukraine

Coordinates: 48.1942°N 26.2253°E

Molnytsia (Ukrainian: Молниця; Romanian: Molnița) is a commune (selsoviet) in Chernivtsi Raion, Chernivtsi Oblast, Ukraine. It is composed of a single village, Molnytsia, and belongs to Hertsa urban hromada, one of the hromadas of Ukraine.

Until 18 July 2020, Molnytsia belonged to Hertsa Raion. The raion was abolished in July 2020 as part of the administrative reform of Ukraine, which reduced the number of raions of Chernivtsi Oblast to three. The area of Hertsa Raion was merged into Chernivtsi Raion. In 2001, 96.97% of the inhabitants spoke Romanian as their native language, while 2,32% spoke Ukrainian.

== Natives ==
- Gheorghe Amihalachioaie (born 1949), Moldovan lawyer and politician
- Mihai Amihalachioaie (1961–2024), Moldovan accordionist and conductor
- Ion Chilaru (1937–1994), journalist, poet and translator
- Simion Gociu (born 1948), activist and poet

== See also ==
- Hertsa region
- Dorohoi County
- Hertsa raion
- Romanians in Ukraine
