= Gheorghe Amihalachioaie =

Moldovan lawyer and politician

Gheorghe Amihalachioaie OR

Member of the Moldovan Parliament
- In office 10 March 1990 – 27 February 1994
- Constituency: Chișinău

Personal details
- Born: June 1, 1949 (age 77) Molnița, Ukrainian SSR, Soviet Union
- Party: Liberal Democratic Party of Moldova
- Other political affiliations: Popular Front of Moldova
- Education: Moldova State University
- Awards: Order of the Republic (Moldova); Order of Honour (Moldova)

Gheorghe Amihalachioaie (born 1 June 1949) is a Moldovan lawyer and politician who served as member of the Parliament of Moldova from 1990 to 1994, a signatory of the Declaration of Independence of the Republic of Moldova.

He was born in Molnița, Hertsa Raion, Ukrainian SSR, Soviet Union, currently Molnytsia, Chernivtsi Raion, Chernivtsi Oblast, Ukraine. In 1996 he was elected President of the Bar Association, and in 1999 he was president of the Union of Lawyers in Moldova. Since 2002 he has been chairman of the Bar Council of the Republic of Moldova. In 2004 he became vice-president of the Centrist Union of Moldova.

After the elections of 29 July 2009, he left the Centrist Union and, together with about 40 MPs from the first Parliament (1990–1994), joined the Liberal Democratic Party of Moldova. He is known for defending his own case at the ECHR, which, on April 20, 2004, won him the case in the "Amihalachioaie vs. Republic of Moldova" file after the Constitutional Court of the Republic of Moldova decided the imposition of a fine because he has made public his critical position towards a court ruling.

In 2011, Amihalachioaie was awarded the Order of Honour, while in 2012 he was awarded the Order of the Republic.
