= Oprysheny =

Village in Chernivtsi Oblast, Ukraine

Coordinates: 48°03′N 26°02′E

Oprysheny (Ukrainian: Опришени; Romanian: Oprișeni; German: Oprischeny) is a village in Chernivtsi Raion, Chernivtsi Oblast, Ukraine. It belongs to Hlyboka settlement hromada, one of the hromadas of Ukraine. Population: 9,376 (2020 est.)

Until 18 July 2020, Oprysheny belonged to Hlyboka Raion. The raion was abolished in July 2020 as part of the administrative reform of Ukraine, which reduced the number of raions of Chernivtsi Oblast to three. The area of Hlyboka Raion was merged into Chernivtsi Raion. In 2001, 95.51% of the inhabitants spoke Romanian as their native language, while 4.07% spoke Ukrainian.

== Natives ==
- Maximilian Hacman (1877–1961), Austro-Hungarian-born Romanian jurist
