= Vasile Tărâțeanu =

Ukrainian journalist (1945–2022)

- Born: 27 September 1945; Verkhni Synivtsi, Chernivtsi Oblast, Ukrainian SSR, USSR
- Died: 8 August 2022 (aged 76); Chernivtsi, Chernivtsi Oblast, Ukraine
- Education: Chernivtsi University
- Parents: Dumitru Tărâțeanu (father); Elena Tărâțeanu (mother)

Vasile Tărâțeanu (Ukrainian: Василь Дмитрович Терицану; 27 September 1945 – 8 August 2022) was a Ukrainian writer and activist of Romanian ethnicity.

== Biography ==
Vasile Tărâțeanu was born to Elena and Dumitru Tărâțeanu on 27 September 1945. He graduated from the Chernivtsi University in 1972. Tărâțeanu worked for the Romanian-language newspaper Zorile Bucovinei (1969–1981) and for Radio Kiev (1981–1991).

In 1989, he founded the Mihai Eminescu Society for Romanian Culture and in 2000, he became the president of the House of the Romanian Language Cultural Foundation in Chernivtsi (Cernăuți). He was editor-in-chief of Plai românesc (1990–1994), Arcașul, Curierul de Cernăuți and Junimea.

Tărâțeanu was a leader of the Democratic Forum of Romanians in Moldova. He died on 8 August 2022, at the age of 76.

== Awards ==
- Premiul revistei "Poesis" (1994; 2000).
- Premiul Societății Scriitorilor Bucovineni (2001).
- Prize of The Moldovan Writers' Union (Premiul Uniunii Scriitorilor din Republica Moldova) (2003).

== Works ==
- Harpele ploii, 1981
- Dreptul la neliniște (Uzhhorod, 1984);
- Linia vieții (Uzhhorod, 1988);
- Teama de înstrăinare (Chișinău, 1990);
- Litanii din Țara de Sus (Timișoara, Ed. Augusta, 1995);
- Litanii (Iași, 1996);
- Pământ în retragere (Timișoara, Editura Augusta, 1999);
- Și ne izbăveşte pre noi (Timișoara, Editura Helicon, 1999);
- Dinafară (Timişoara, Editura Augusta, 2003) etc.
- Ochean cu cioburi sângerânde (Cluj-Napoca, Editura Dacia, 2005);
- Infern personal, ediție bilingvă: în română și în franceză (Iași, Editura Danaster, 2005);
- Crucificat pe harta țării, Vasile Tărâțeanu – 60, volum omagial, (București, Editura Semne, 2005);
- Aruncarea zarurilor, in Colecția Biblioteca Revistei "Convorbiri literare" (Iași, Editura Timpul, 2005);
- Orizonturi decapitate (Timișoara, Editura Augusta, 2005);
- Degețelul salvator, versuri pentru copii, în colecția "Biblioteca revistei Făgurel (Cernauți, Editura Zoloti Lytavry, 2006);
- Cimitir ambulant (Râmnicu Sărat, Editura RaFet, 2008).
- Iluzii și lanțuri (Craiova, Editura Scrisul Românesc, 2001)
- Stâlpul de foc (Craiova, Editura Scrisul Românesc, 2007).
