= Dymka =

Commune in Chernivtsi Oblast, Ukraine

Dymka Димка Dimca (in Romanian)
- Village
- Interactive map of Dymka
- Location in Chernivtsi Oblast Location in Ukraine
- Coordinates: 48°05′50″N 25°58′31″E
- Country: Ukraine
- Oblast: Chernivtsi Oblast
- Raion: Chernivtsi Raion
- Hromada: Hlyboka settlement hromada

Population (2020)
  - Total: 9,376
- Time zone: UTC+2 (EET)
  - Summer (DST): UTC+3 (EEST)
- Postal code: 60407
- Area code: +380 3734
- KOATUU: 7321081901

Dymka (Ukrainian: Димка; Romanian: Dimca or Trestiana) is a commune (selsoviet) in Chernivtsi Raion, Chernivtsi Oblast, Ukraine. It is composed of a single village, Dymka. It belongs to Hlyboka settlement hromada, one of the hromadas of Ukraine. Population: 9,376 (2020 est.)

Until 18 July 2020, Dymka belonged to Hlyboka Raion. The raion was abolished in July 2020 as part of the administrative reform of Ukraine, which reduced the number of raions of Chernivtsi Oblast to three. The area of Hlyboka Raion was merged into Chernivtsi Raion.
