= Nyzhni Petrivtsi =

Village in Chernivtsi Oblast, Ukraine

Nyzhni Petrivtsi Нижні Петрівці Pătrăuții de Jos
- Village
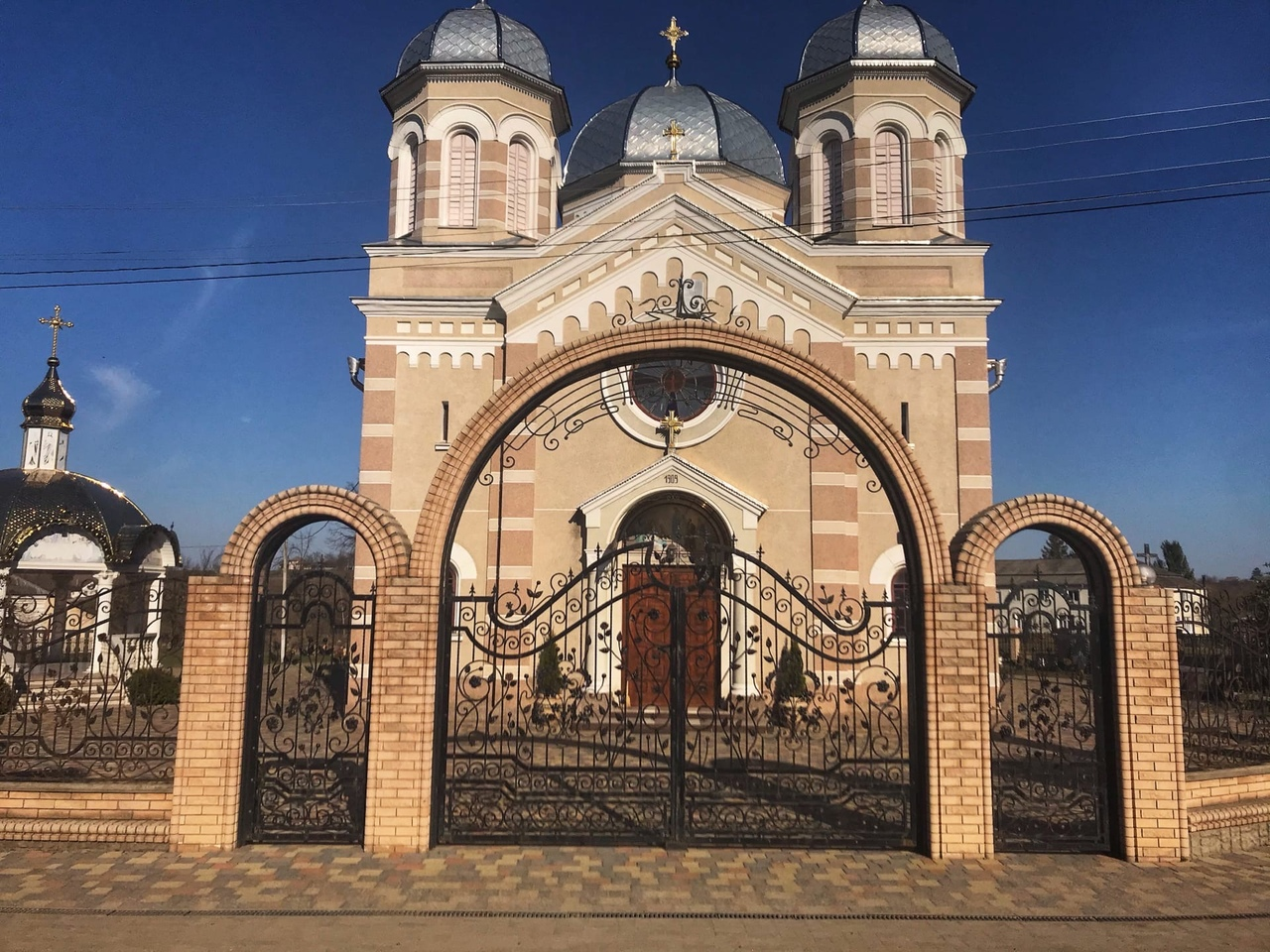
- Church of the Assumption of St. Mother of God in Nyzhni Petrivtsi

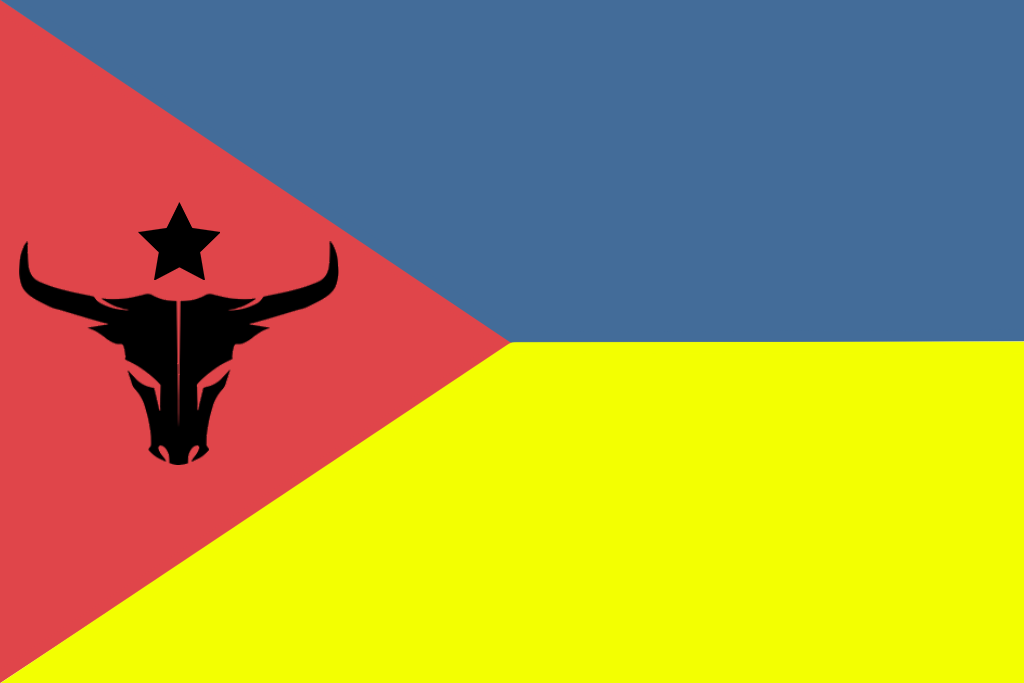
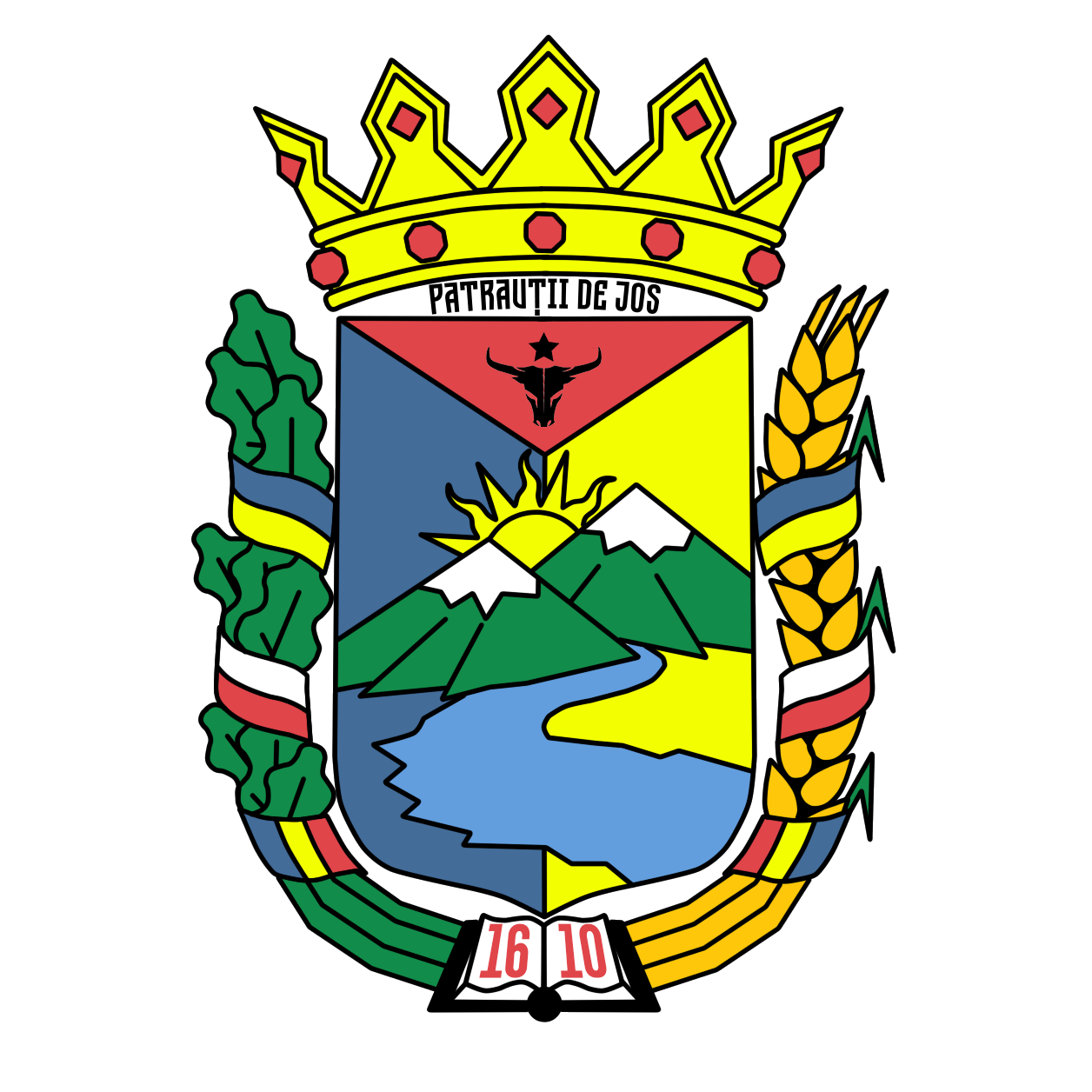
- Flag Coat of arms
- Interactive map of Nyzhni Petrivtsi
- Location in Chernivtsi Oblast Location in Ukraine
- Coordinates: 48°1′52″N 25°43′3″E
- Country: Ukraine
- Oblast: Chernivtsi Oblast
- Raion: Chernivtsi Raion
- Hromada: Petrivtsi rural hromada
- Elevation: 412 m (1,352 ft)

Population
  - Total: 3,004
- Time zone: UTC+2 (EET)
  - Summer (DST): UTC+3 (EEST)
- Postal code: 59035
- Area code: +380 3735
- KOATUU: 7324587001
- KATOTTH: UA73060450030053836

Nyzhni Petrivtsi (Ukrainian: Нижні Петрівці; Romanian: Pătrăuții de Jos; German: Unterpetroutz) is a village in Chernivtsi Raion, Chernivtsi Oblast, Ukraine. It belongs to Petrivtsi rural hromada, one of the hromadas of Ukraine.

Until 18 July 2020, Nyzhni Petrivtsi belonged to Storozhynets Raion. The raion was abolished in July 2020 as part of the administrative reform of Ukraine, which reduced the number of raions of Chernivtsi Oblast to three. The area of Storozhynets Raion was merged into Chernivtsi Raion. In 2001, 96.18% of the inhabitants spoke Romanian as their native language, while 2.36% spoke Ukrainian.
