= Mihai Amihălăchioaie =

Moldovan accordionist and conductor (1961–2024)

- Born: 23 February 1961; Molnytsia, Ukrainian SSR, Soviet Union
- Died: 11 February 2024 (aged 62)
- Education: Academy of Music, Theater and Fine Arts
- Occupations: Accordionist, conductor
- Years active: 1985–2024
- Honours: Master of Art of Moldova

Mihai Amihălăchioaie (23 February 1961 – 11 February 2024) was a Moldovan accordionist and conductor.

== Early life and education ==
Amihălăchioaie was born on 23 February 1961, in Molnytsia. He started his musical education at Hertsa Music School and completed it at the Ștefan Neaga College of Music, located in Chișinău. He then studied piano, accordion and folk orchestra conducting at the Gavriil Musicescu State Conservatory (present-day Academy of Music, Theater and Fine Arts), also in Chișinău, graduating in 1985. In 1997, he graduated from a second faculty at the same university, this time in conducting symphonic and opera music.

== Career ==
In 1985, he started his career as an accordionist and the folk music conductor of the Busuioc Moldovenesc Ensemble, a band disbanded in 2001 due to financial issues, but returned in November 2011.

In 1998, he started working as a conductor at the "Serghei Lunchevici" National Philharmonic, the National Chamber Orchestra of Moldova, and the Chisinau Radio-TV Symphony Orchestra, places he worked at until his death. He was also an employee of the Maria Bieșu National Opera and Ballet Theatre.

He also collaborated with the Romanian group Provincialii. Between 2001 and 2002, he worked with Antoni Ros-Marbà, with whom he improved his mastery greatly. Maria Iliuț, the popular music singer, was among those with whom he collaborated.

Amihalachioaie performed artistic tours in many countries, including Romania, Spain, Bulgaria, Germany, France, Italy and the United Kingdom. He held his last concert in Vienna.

In 2001, he was awarded the "Master of Art of Moldova" (See also: Category:People with the honorary title Master of Art of Moldova) honorary title, and from 2021 until his death, he was the leader and conductor of the Municipal Chamber Orchestra Camerata Chisinau, an orchestra created in 2000 which gave its first concert in 2021.

== Illness and death ==
In 2023, he was diagnosed with liver cancer. In July 2023, Amihălăchioaie went to Istanbul, where he underwent a liver transplant operation a month later in August. The donor was his son Petru.

Amihălăchioaie died on the night of 11 February 2024, at the age of 62. A minute of silence was held for him on 13 February. He was buried at Chișinău Central Cemetery on 14 February 2024, after a funeral held at the Nicolae Sulac National Palace.
