= Kupka, Chernivtsi Oblast =

Commune in Chernivtsi Oblast, Ukraine

Kupka Купка
- Village
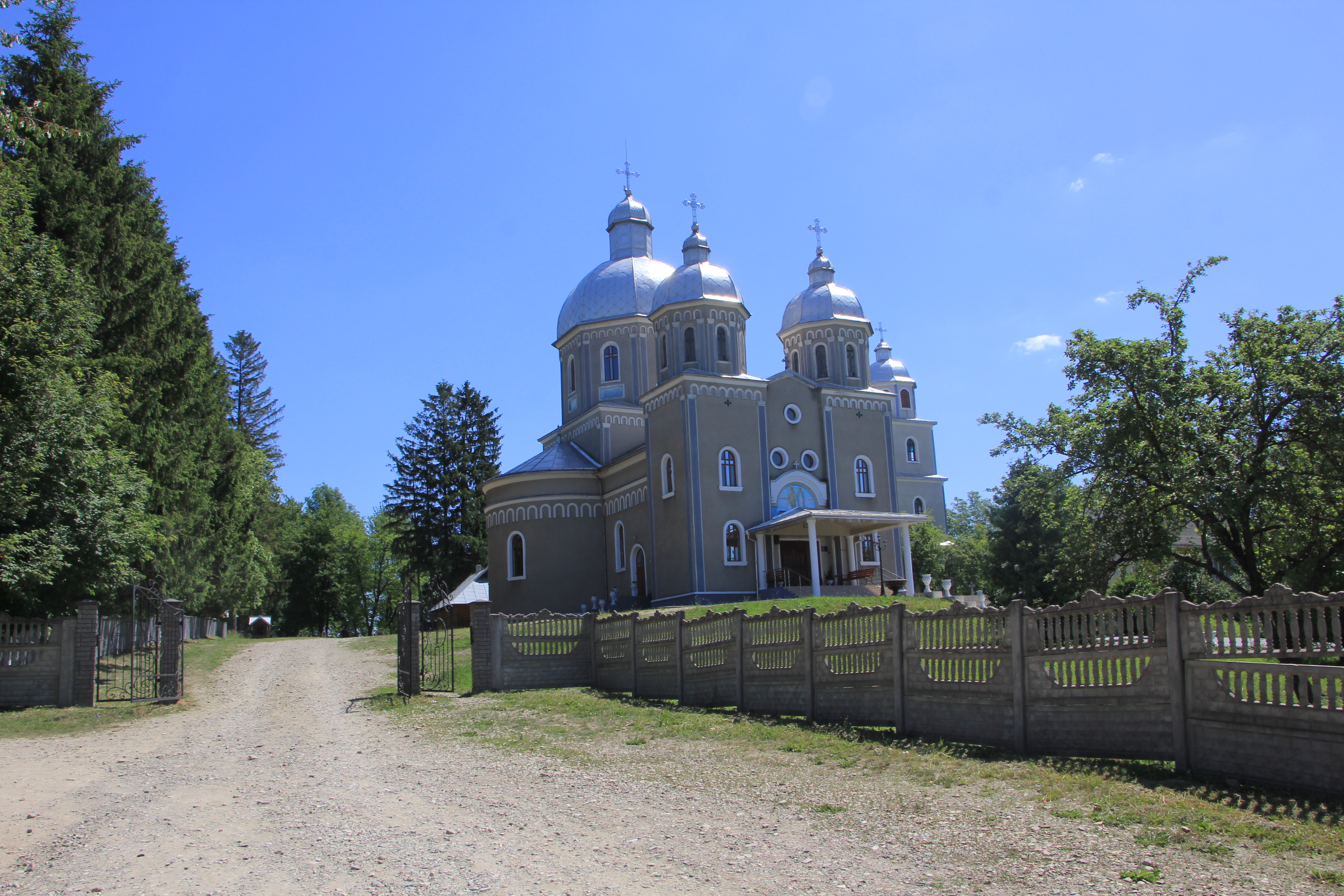

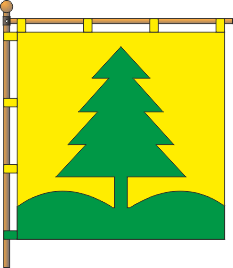
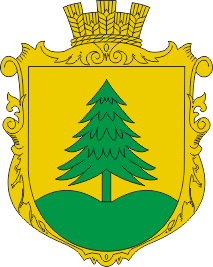
- Flag Coat of arms

- Location within Chernivtsi Oblast Location within Ukraine
- Country: Ukraine
- Oblast: Chernivtsi Oblast
- Raion: Chernivtsi Raion
- Hromada: Sucheveny rural hromada
- Elevation: 365 m (1,198 ft)

Population
  - Total: 2,671
- Postal code: 60425

Kupka (Ukrainian: Купка; Romanian: Cupca) is a village in Chernivtsi Raion, Chernivtsi Oblast, Ukraine. It belongs to Sucheveny rural hromada, one of the hromadas of Ukraine. The language of communication of the population is Romanian and Ukrainian.

Until 18 July 2020, Kupka belonged to Hlyboka Raion. The raion was abolished in July 2020 as part of the administrative reform of Ukraine, which reduced the number of raions of Chernivtsi Oblast to three. The area of Hlyboka Raion was merged into Chernivtsi Raion. In 2001, 97.23% of the inhabitants spoke Romanian as their native language, while 2.06% spoke Ukrainian.

A report by HotNews published on 24 February 2024 showed that, by that date, two inhabitants of Kupka had died fighting in the war against Russia. One of them, Todor Schipor Bobu, died on 16 January 2023 during the battle of Bakhmut. He received the Order for Courage for his actions on the frontline. According to the mayor of Kupka, Lilia Tovarnițca, some eight or nine inhabitants of the village, including the two that had died, had voluntarily gone to the front by that time. Kupka was found to be depleted of men, with many having left the village to work abroad even before the start of the war and others having left once the war started often with the help of their Romanian passports.
