= Chernivtsi Oblast Council =

Legislature of Chernivtsi Oblast, Ukraine

Type
- Type: Unicameral
- Houses: 1

Leadership
- Speaker: Oleksiy Boyko

Structure
- Seats: 64
- Political groups: 12 Servant of the People; 9 Fatherland; 9 United Alternative; 9 European Solidarity; 7 Agrarian Party; 6 People's Control; 6 Opposition Platform — For Life; 6 For the Future

Elections
- Last election: 25 October 2020

Meeting place
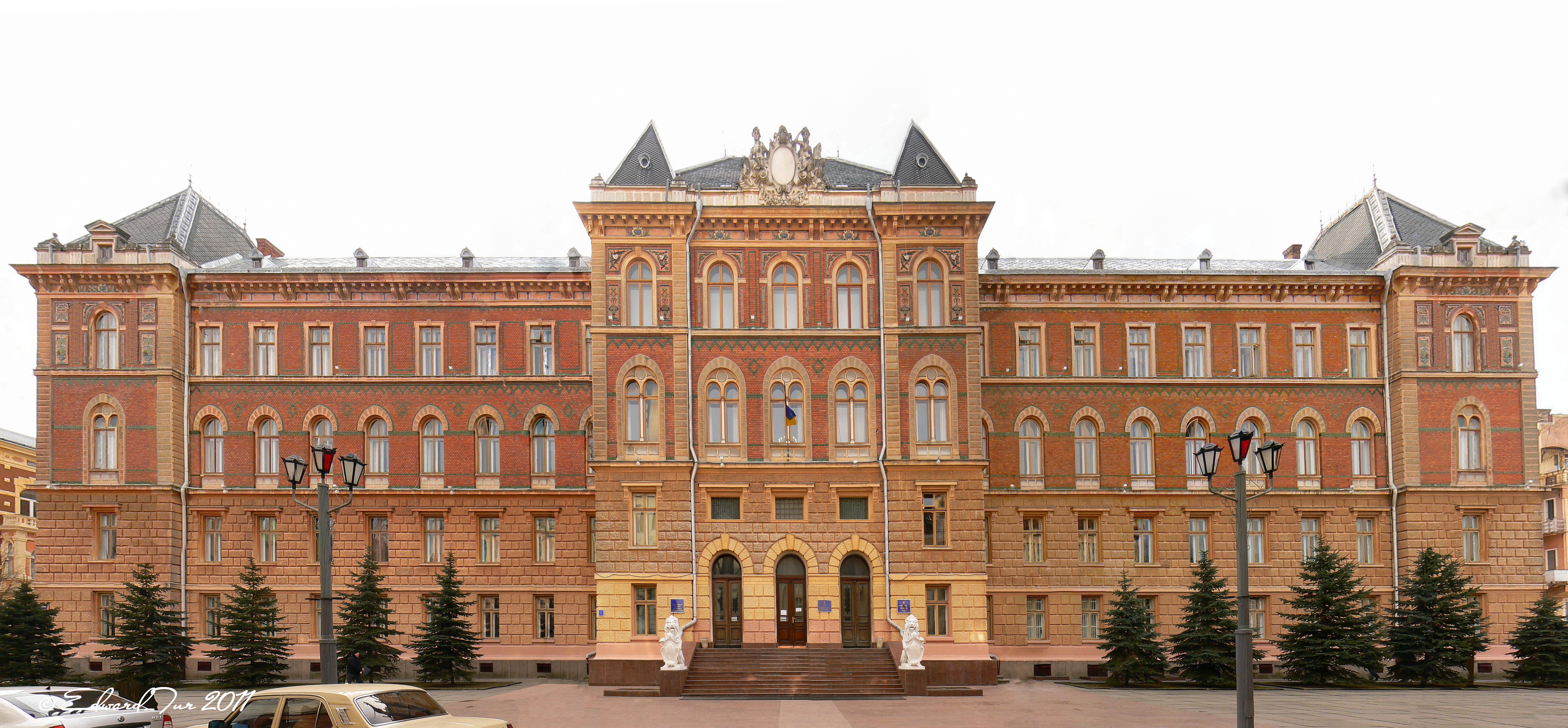
- Chernivtsi, Chernivtsi Oblast

Website
- http://oblrada.cv.ua/

The Chernivtsi Oblast Council (Ukrainian: Чернівецька обласна рада) is the regional oblast council (parliament) of the Chernivtsi Oblast (province) located in western Ukraine.

Council members are elected for five year terms. In order to gain representation in the council, a party must gain more than 5 percent of the total vote.

== Recent elections ==
=== 2020 ===
Distribution of seats after the 2020 Ukrainian local elections

- 12 Servant of the People
- 9 Fatherland
- 9 United Alternative
- 9 European Solidarity
- 7 Agrarian Party
- 6 People's Control
- 6 Opposition Platform — For Life
- 6 For the Future

Election date was 25 October 2020

=== 2015 ===
Distribution of seats after the 2015 Ukrainian local elections

- 15 Solidarity
- 12 Fatherland
- 7 Agrarian Party
- 5 Self Reliance
- 5 Radical Party
- 4 People's Movement "People's Control"
- 4 Svoboda
- 4 Our Land
- 4 Opposition Bloc
- 4 UKROP

Election date was 25 October 2015

== Chairmen ==
=== Regional executive committee ===
- Vladimir Ocheretyany (July 4, 1940–August 20, 1940)
- Alexei Kolikov (August 20, 1940–August 13, 1948)
- Roman Buldovich (August 13, 1948–May 20, 1950)
- Mikhail Markin (May 1950–January 5, 1953)
- Grigory Chaly (March 10, 1953–October 24, 1955)
- Alexander Botvinov (October 25, 1955–May 12, 1956)
- Alexei Bodyukh (July 3, 1956–August 7, 1960)
- Fyodor Matsidonsky (September 20, 1960–November 18, 1963)
- Dmitry Arshinov (November 18, 1963–August 25, 1965)
- Ivan Musienko (December 6, 1965–June 17, 1973)
- Viktor Lenchinsky (June 22, 1973–January 1990)
- Ivan Hnatyshyn (January 1990–April 1992)

=== Regional council ===
- Yevhen Dmitriev (April 1990–June 1991)
- Ivan Hnatyshyn (June 1991–April 1992)
- Vasyl Kovbas (April 17, 1992–July 1994)
- Ivan Hnatyshyn (July 1994–November 28, 1996)
- Ivan Shilepnytsky (November 28, 1996–April 20, 2002)
- Teofil Bauer (April 20, 2002–August 29, 2002)
- Oleksandr Smotr (August 29, 2002–June 16, 2005)
- Oleksandr Hrushko (June 23, 2005–May 4, 2006)
- Ivan Shilepnytskyi (May 4, 2006–November 19, 2010)
- Vasyl Vatamanyuk (November 19, 2010–February 15, 2011)
- Valentyn Manilich (2011–2012, acting)
- Mykhailo Hainicheru (March 16, 2012–December 1, 2015)
- Ivan Muntyan (December 1, 2015–December 17, 2020)
- Oleksiy Boyko (December 17, 2020–)
