= Yordaneshty =

Commune in Chernivtsi Oblast, Ukraine

Coordinates: 48.0978°N 25.8064°E

Yordaneshty (Ukrainian: Йорданешти; Romanian: Iordănești or Ordanesti or Ordinestie or Ardănești; German: Jordanestie) is a village in Chernivtsi Raion, Chernivtsi Oblast, Ukraine. It hosts the administration of Karapchiv rural hromada, one of the hromadas of Ukraine. Between the years 1946 and 1995 the town was known as Pidlisne (Ukrainian: Підлісне).

Until 18 July 2020, Yordaneshty belonged to Hlyboka Raion. The raion was abolished in July 2020 as part of the administrative reform of Ukraine, which reduced the number of raions of Chernivtsi Oblast to three. The area of Hlyboka Raion was merged into Chernivtsi Raion. In 2001, 96.15% of the inhabitants spoke Romanian as their native language, while 3.36% spoke Ukrainian.

== Notable people ==
- Mircea Lutic (1939–2020), Ukrainian Romanian teacher, poet, translator and publicist
