= Sucheveny =

Village in Chernivtsi Oblast, Ukraine

Coordinates: 48°03′N 25°50′E

Sucheveny (Ukrainian: Сучевени; Romanian: Suceveni; German: Suczaweny or Suczaweni) is a village in Chernivtsi Raion, Chernivtsi Oblast, Ukraine. It hosts the administration of Sucheveny rural hromada, one of the hromadas of Ukraine.

Until 18 July 2020, Sucheveny belonged to Hlyboka Raion. The raion was abolished in July 2020 as part of the administrative reform of Ukraine, which reduced the number of raions of Chernivtsi Oblast to three. The area of Hlyboka Raion was merged into Chernivtsi Raion. In 2001, 88.08% of the inhabitants spoke Romanian as their native language, while 11.08% spoke Ukrainian.

== Notable people ==
- Arcadie Suceveanu (born 1952), poet, essayist, translator and journalist in Moldova
