= Karapchiv, Chernivtsi Raion, Chernivtsi Oblast =

Village in Chernivtsi Oblast, Ukraine

Coordinates: 48.0903°N 25.8472°E

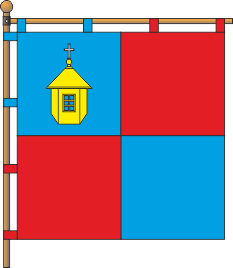

Karapchiv (Ukrainian: Карапчів; Romanian: Carapciu or Carapciu pe Siret; German: Karapcziu or Karapczin) is a village in Chernivtsi Raion, Chernivtsi Oblast, Ukraine. It belongs to Karapchiv rural hromada, one of the hromadas of Ukraine.

Until 18 July 2020, Karapchiv belonged to Hlyboka Raion. The raion was abolished in July 2020 as part of the administrative reform of Ukraine, which reduced the number of raions of Chernivtsi Oblast to three. The area of Hlyboka Raion was merged into Chernivtsi Raion. In 2001, 91.11% of the inhabitants spoke Romanian as their native language, while 8.27% spoke Ukrainian.

== Notable people ==
- Aurica Bojescu (born 1961), lawyer, minority rights activist and politician
- Vasile Levițchi (1921–1997), poet, publicist, translator and teacher
