= Bila Krynytsia, Chernivtsi Oblast =

Bila Krynytsia Біла Криниця Fântâna Albă Белая Криница
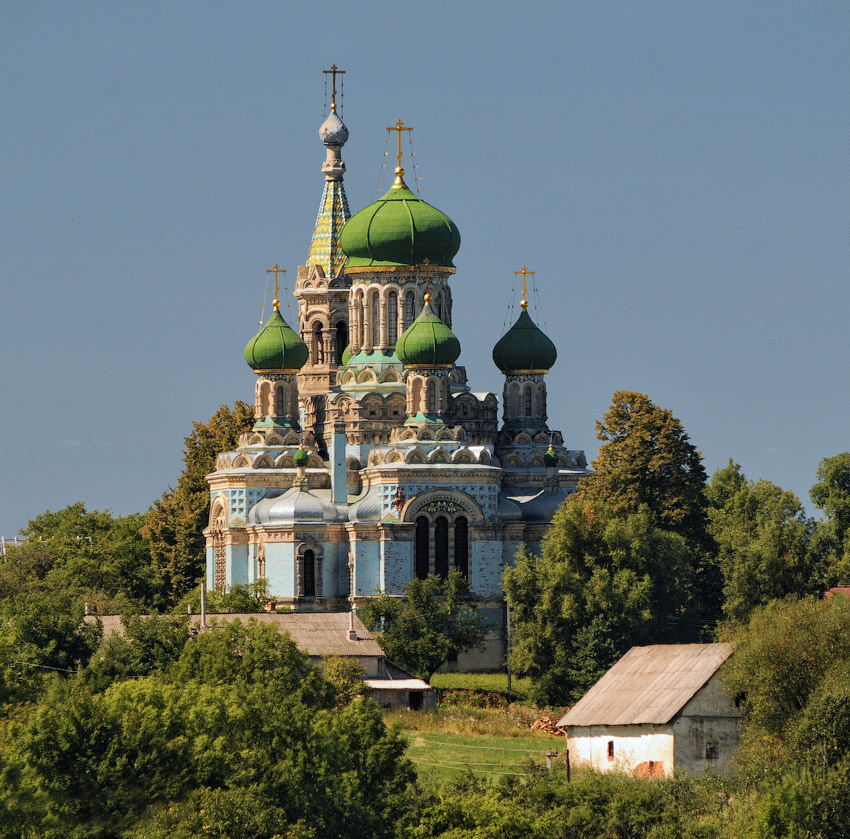
- Dormition Cathedral of the Old Believers
- Interactive map of Bila Krynytsia
- Location within Chernivtsi Oblast Location within Ukraine
- Coordinates: 47°58′37″N 25°53′0″E
- Country: Ukraine
- Oblast: Chernivtsi Oblast
- Raion: Chernivtsi Raion
- Elevation: 450 m (1,480 ft)

Population
  - Total: 169
- Time zone: UTC+2 (EET)
  - Summer (DST): UTC+3 (EEST)
- Postal code: 60440
- Area code: +380 3734
- KOATUU: 7321086303

Bila Krynytsia (Ukrainian: Біла Криниця; Russian: Белая Криница, romanized: Belaya Krinitsa; Romanian: Fântâna Albă) is a village in Ukraine, administered by the village Staryi Vovchynets in the Kamianka rural hromada of the Chernivtsi Raion in the Chernivtsi Oblast. It is located 45 km from the district center, near the border crossing into Romania 'Bila Krynytsia–Climăuți'.

The village is located in the historical region of Bukovina. The time of the founding of the village is unknown. In January 1775, it became part of the Habsburg Empire. The name of the village comes from the whitish color of the water in some local wells caused by the presence of chalk rocks in the soil.

On 28 November 1918, the village of Bila Krynytsia became part of Kingdom of Romania (Rădăuți County). At that time, most of the population was made up of Lipovans.

The village was the seat of the first hierarch within the Belokrinitskaya Hierarchy from 1846 to 1940. Afterwards, due to the Soviet occupation of Northern Bukovina, it moved to Brăila for two reasons: fear of persecution by the Soviet authorities and the fact that it was the only Lipovan village in Northern Bukovina. All other vicariates in its territory were located either in Southern Bukovina, which remained in Romania, or in other parts of Romania.

In 1941, the village was the site of the Fântâna Albă massacre.
