= Administrative divisions of Chernivtsi Oblast =

Chernivtsi Oblast is subdivided into districts (raions) which are further subdivided into territorial communities (hromadas).

== Current ==
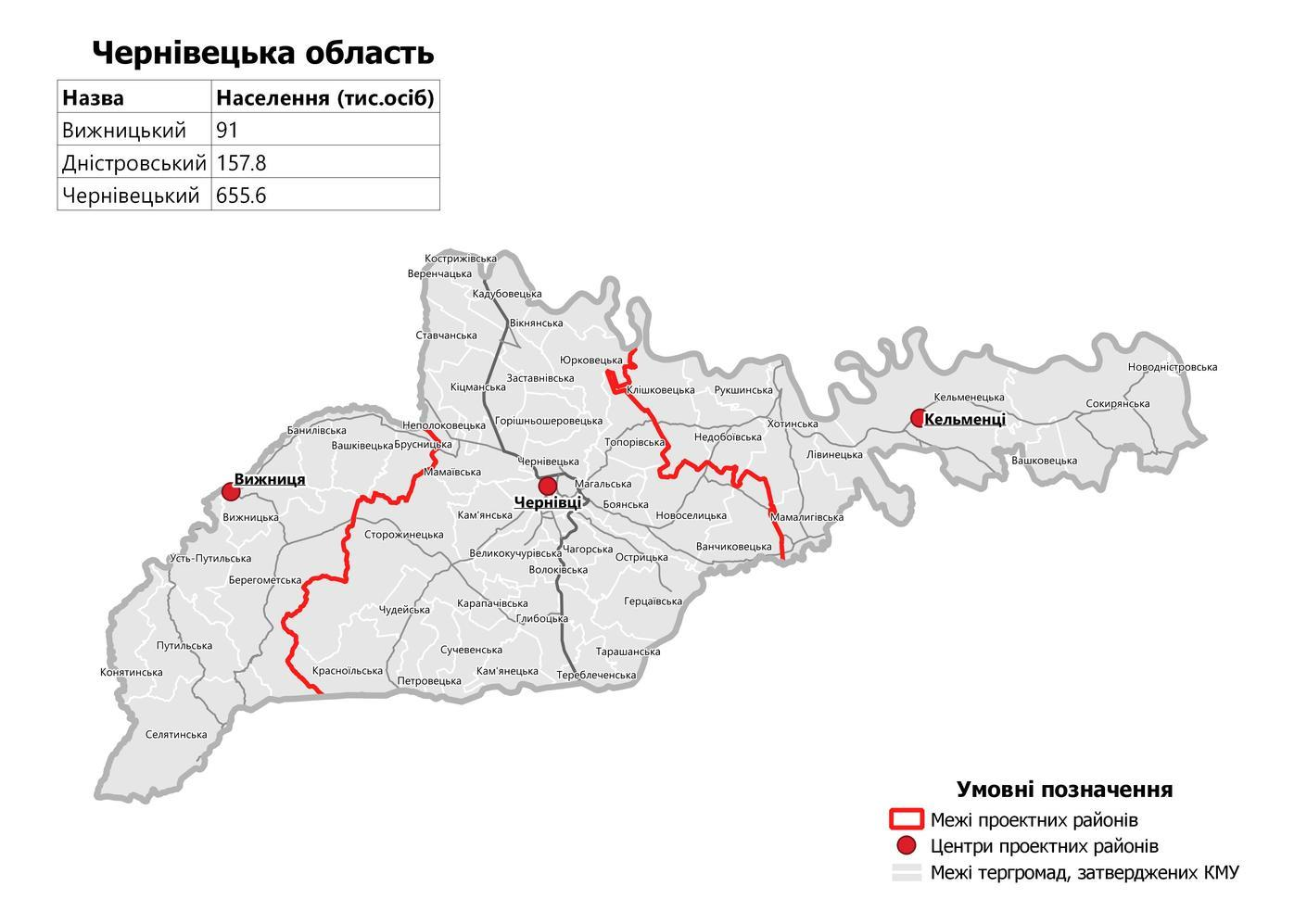
Administrative divisions of Chernivtsi Oblast as of August 2020

On 18 July 2020, the number of districts was reduced to three. These are:

1. Chernivtsi (Чернівецький район), the center is in the city of Chernivtsi;
2. Dniester (Дністровський район), the center is in the rural settlement of Kelmentsi;
3. Vyzhnytsia (Вижницький район), the center is in the city of Vyzhnytsia.

**Chernivtsi Oblast**
As of January 1, 2022
Number of districts (райони)	3
Number of hromadas (громади)	52

=== Communities (hromadas) per District (raion) ===
In bold are communities (hromadas) with cities

Chernivtsi Raion

- Boyany
- Chahor
- **Chernivtsi**
- Chudei
- **Hertsa**
- Hlyboka
- Horishni Sherivtsi
- Kadubivtsi
- Kamyana
- Kamyanka
- Karapchiv
- **Kitsman**
- Kostryzhivka
- Krasnoyilsk
- Mahala
- Mamayivtsi
- Nepolokivtsi
- **Novoselytsia**
- Ostrytsia
- Petrivtsi
- Stavchany
- **Storozhynets**
- Sucheveny
- Tarashany
- Terebleche
- Toporivtsi
- Vanchykivtsi
- Velykyi Kuchuriv
- Verenchanka
- Vikno
- Voloka
- Yurkivtsi
- **Zastavna**

Dniester Raion

- Kelmentsi
- **Khotyn**
- Klishkivtsi
- Livyntsi
- Mamalyha
- Nedoboyivtsi
- **Novodnistrovsk**
- Rukshyn
- **Sokyriany**
- Vashkivtsi

Vyzhnytsia Raion

- Banyliv
- Berehomet
- Brusnytsia
- Koniatyn
- Putyla
- Seliatyn
- Ust-Putyla
- **Vashkivtsi**
- **Vyzhnytsia**

== Administrative divisions until 2020 ==
Raions of Chernivtsi Oblast as of June 2020. The city of Chernivtsi is shown in dark blue.

Before July 2020, Chernivtsi Oblast was subdivided into 13 regions: 11 districts (raions) and 2 city municipalities (mis'krada or misto), officially known as territories governed by city councils.

- Cities under the oblast's jurisdiction:
  - Chernivtsi (Чернівці), the administrative center of the oblast
  - Novodnistrovsk (Новодністровськ)
- Districts (raions):
  - Hertsa (Герцаївський район)
    - Cities under the district's jurisdiction:
      - Hertsa (Герца)
  - Hlyboka (Глибоцький район)
    - Urban-type settlements under the district's jurisdiction:
      - Hlyboka (Глибока)
  - Kelmentsi (Кельменецький район)
    - Urban-type settlements under the district's jurisdiction:
      - Kelmentsi (Кельменці)
  - Khotyn (Хотинський район)
    - Cities under the district's jurisdiction:
      - Khotyn (Хотин)
  - Kitsman (Кіцманський район)
    - Cities under the district's jurisdiction:
      - Kitsman (Кіцмань)
    - Urban-type settlements under the district's jurisdiction:
      - Luzhany (Лужани)
      - Nepolokivtsi (Неполоківці)
  - Novoselytsia (Новоселицький район)
    - Cities under the district's jurisdiction:
      - Novoselytsia (Новоселиця)
  - Putyla (Путильський район)
    - Urban-type settlements under the district's jurisdiction:
      - Putyla (Путила)
  - Sokyriany (Сокирянський район)
    - Cities under the district's jurisdiction:
      - Sokyriany (Сокиряни)
  - Storozhynets (Сторожинецький район)
    - Cities under the district's jurisdiction:
      - Storozhynets (Сторожинець)
    - Urban-type settlements under the district's jurisdiction:
      - Krasnoilsk (Красноїльськ)
  - Vyzhnytsia (Вижницький район)
    - Cities under the district's jurisdiction:
      - Vashkivtsi (Вашківці)
      - Vyzhnytsia (Вижниця)
    - Urban-type settlements under the district's jurisdiction:
      - Berehomet (Берегомет)
  - Zastavna (Заставнівський район)
    - Cities under the district's jurisdiction:
      - Zastavna (Заставна)
    - Urban-type settlements under the district's jurisdiction:
      - Kostryzhivka (Кострижівка)
