= List of cities in Chernivtsi Oblast =

Location of cities in Chernivtsi Oblast

There are 11 populated places in Chernivtsi Oblast, Ukraine, that have been officially granted city status (Ukrainian: місто, romanized: misto) by the Verkhovna Rada, the country's parliament. Settlements with more than 10,000 people are eligible for city status, although the status is typically also granted to settlements of historical or regional importance. As of 5 December 2001, the date of the first and only official census in the country since independence, (Note: As of 11 July 2023) the most populous city in the oblast was the regional capital, Chernivtsi, with a population of 240,621 people, while the least populous city was Hertsa, with 2,068 people. The Residence of Bukovinian and Dalmatian Metropolitans, a historical building complex recognized as one of Ukraine's eight World Heritage Sites and currently serving as part of Chernivtsi University, is located in Chernivtsi.

From independence in 1991 to 2020, two cities in the oblast were designated as cities of regional significance (municipalities), which had self-government under city councils, while the oblast's remaining nine cities were located amongst eleven raions (districts) as cities of district significance, which are subordinated to the governments of the raions. On 18 July 2020, an administrative reform abolished and merged the oblast's raions and cities of regional significance into three new, expanded raions. The three raions that make up the oblast are Chernivtsi, Dniester, and Vyzhnytsia.

== List of cities ==
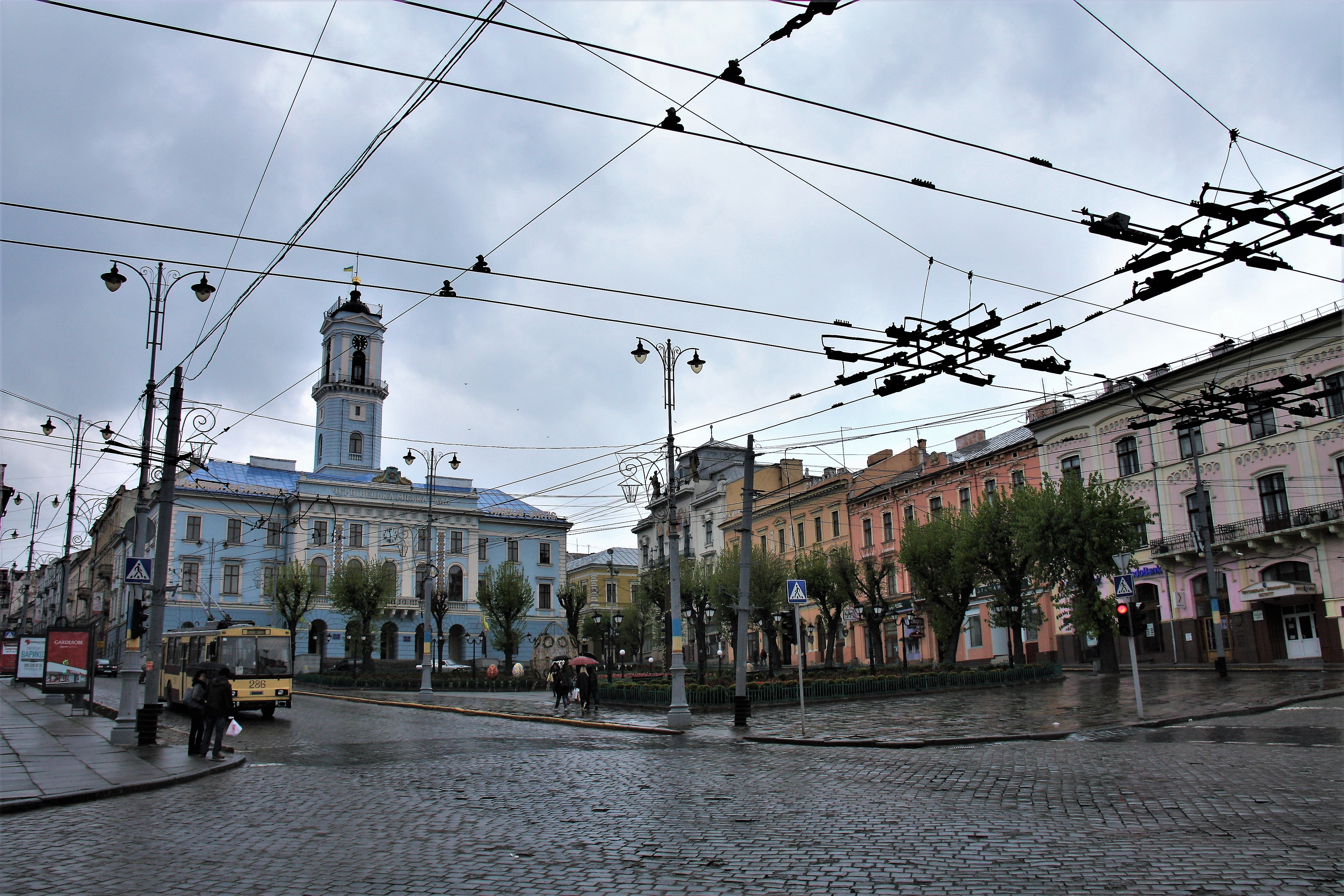
Chernivtsi, capital and most populous city in Chernivtsi Oblast

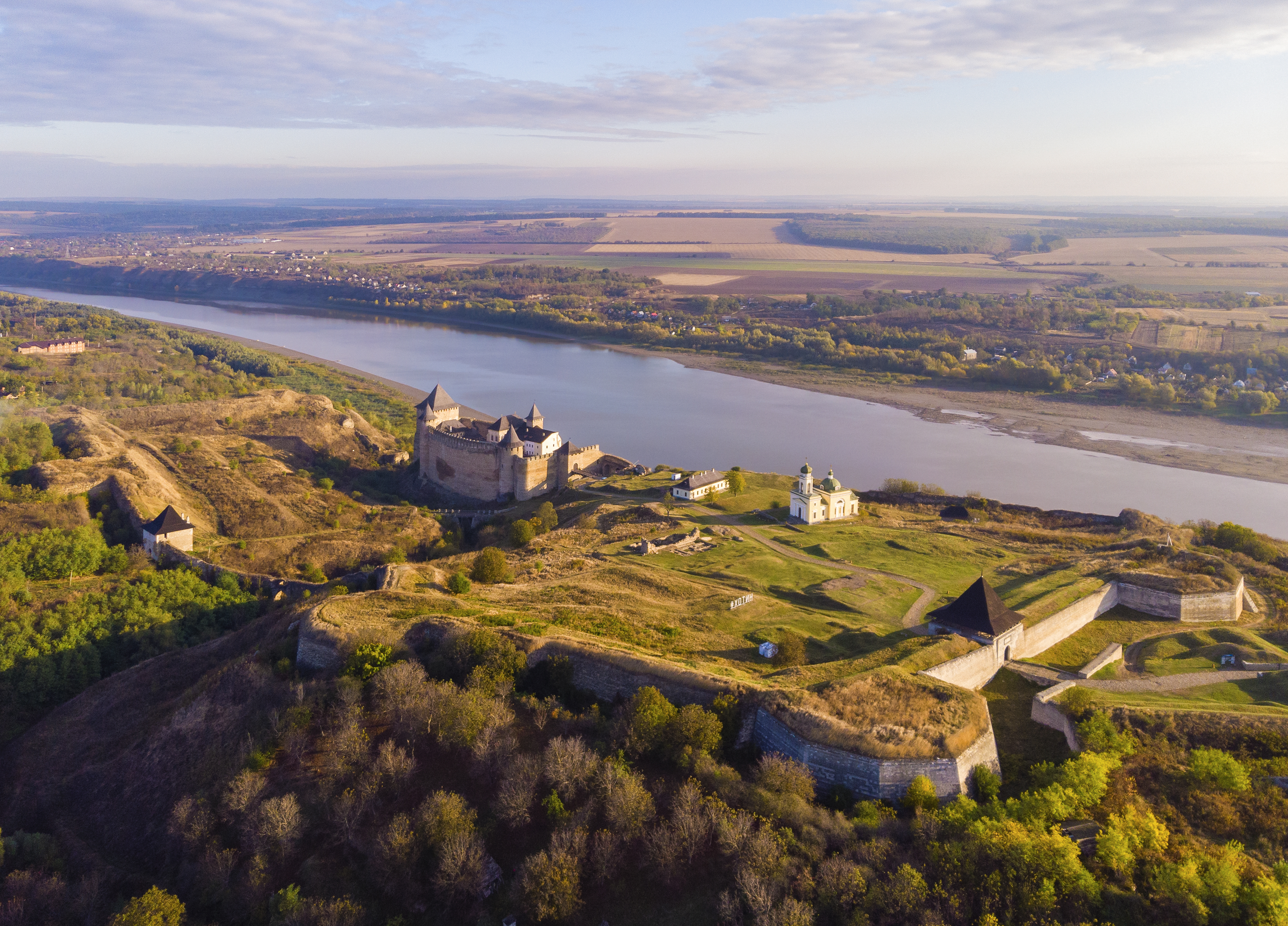
Khotyn, third largest city in the oblast known for its fortress complex

Cities in Chernivtsi Oblast
Name	Name (in Ukrainian) (Note: Links to the Ukrainian Wikipedia articles for each city)	Raion (district)	Population (2022 estimates)	Population (2001 census)	Population change
Chernivtsi	Чернівці	Chernivtsi	264,298	240,621	+9.84%
Hertsa	Герца	Chernivtsi	2,097	2,068	+1.40%
Kitsman	Кіцмань	Chernivtsi	6,049	7,608	−20.49%
Khotyn	Хотин	Dniester	8,936	11,216	−20.33%
Novodnistrovsk	Новодністровськ	Dniester	10,463	10,342	+1.17%
Novoselytsia	Новоселиця	Chernivtsi	7,399	8,400	−11.92%
Sokyriany	Сокиряни	Dniester	8,547	10,258	−16.68%
Storozhynets	Сторожинець	Chernivtsi	14,077	14,693	−4.19%
Vashkivtsi	Вашківці	Vyzhnytsia	5,215	5,987	−12.89%
Vyzhnytsia	Вижниця	Vyzhnytsia	3,803	5,021	−24.26%
Zastavna	Заставна	Chernivtsi	7,750	8,866	−12.59%

== See also ==
- List of cities in Ukraine
