= Krokva =

Village in Dniester Raion, Chernivtsi Oblast, Ukraine

Krokva Кроква Crocva
- Location of Krokva Krokva (Ukraine)
- Coordinates: 48°25′23″N 26°36′20″E
- Country: Ukraine
- Oblast: Chernivtsi Oblast
- Raion: Dniester Raion
- Elevation: 182 m (597 ft)

Population (2001)
  - Total: 221
- Time zone: UTC+2 (EET)
  - Summer (DST): UTC+3 (EEST)
- Postal code: 60124
- Area code: +380 3732

Krokva (Ukrainian: Кроква; Romanian: Crocva) is a village in Dniester Raion, Chernivtsi Oblast, Ukraine. It is part of Livyntsi rural hromada, one of the hromadas of Ukraine.

Until 18 July 2020, Krokva was located in Kelmentsi Raion. The raion was abolished in July 2020 as part of the administrative reform of Ukraine, which reduced the number of raions of Chernivtsi Oblast to three. The area of Kelmentsi Raion was merged into Dniester Raion.

== Demographics ==
According to the 1989 census, the population of Krokva was 262 people, of whom 114 were men and 148 women.
