= Dniester Pumped Storage Power Station =

Dam in Chernivtsyi Oblast, Ukraine

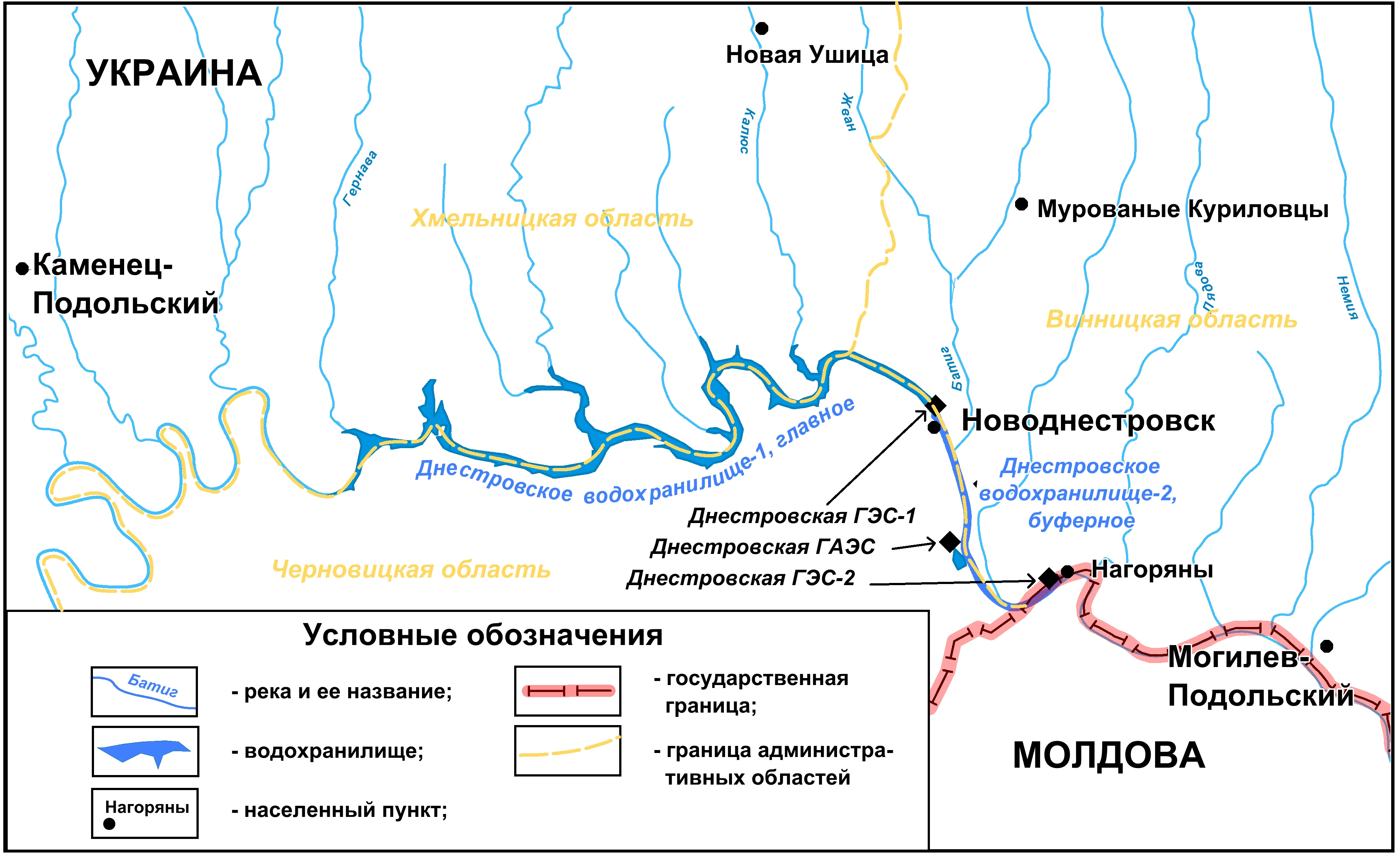
- Dniester reservoir
- Interactive map of Dniester Pumped Storage Power Station
- Country: Ukraine
- Location: Sokyriany
- Coordinates: 48°30′49″N 27°28′24″E
- Status: Partially operational
- Construction began: 1983
- Opening date: 2009–2028
- Owner: Government of Ukraine
- Operator: Ukrhydroenergo

Upper reservoir
- Creates: Dniester Upper
- Total capacity: 38,800,000 m^{3} (31,456 acre⋅ft)

Lower reservoir
- Creates: Dniester HPP-I Dam
- Total capacity: 70,000,000 m^{3} (56,750 acre⋅ft)

Power Station
- Hydraulic head: 38.7 m (127 ft)
- Turbines: 7 x 324 MW reversible Francis turbines
- Installed capacity: 1296 MW
- Website https://uhe.gov.ua/

The Dniester Pumped Storage Power Station is a pumped storage hydroelectric scheme that uses the Dniester River 8 kilometres (5.0 mi) northeast of Sokyriany in Chernivtsi Oblast, Ukraine. Currently, four of seven 324-megawatt (434,000 hp) generators are operational and when complete in 2028, the power station will have an installed capacity of 2,268 megawatts (3,041,000 hp).

== Background ==
As part of the Dniester Hydro Power Complex, the pumped storage power station (PSPS) was planned in the 1970s along with two dams (Dniester I & II) and a nuclear power plant. In 1983, Dniester II, a dam which creates the PSPS's lower reservoir, was completed. The PSPS was approved by 1988 and construction began that same year. Three years later in 1991 though, construction was suspended due to a funding fallout from the dissolution of the Soviet Union. The project was re-approved in 1993 and construction commenced again in 2001. Project costs increased due to the poor state of the existing facilities which were not maintained while the project was suspended. On December 22, 2009, the PSP's first generator was commissioned. The second generator was commissioned in December 2013. The third generator was commissioned on 21 December 2015. Fourth generator was commissioned in December 2021.

Ukraine's problems funding the project have been compounded by controversy surrounding the project's transparency and impacts on the environment and water flow to Moldova downstream. Ukraine had sought funding from the World Bank who, in 2007, only funded US$29.6 million towards the PSP's electrical transmission system. Industry experts believe Ukraine will be able to complete the project independently. The power station is expected to be fully operational in 2020s.

== Design and operation ==
The power station begins operation by using reversible turbines to pump water, during low energy demand periods, from the lower reservoir which is created by the Dniester HPP-II Dam, located 7.5 kilometres (5 mi) to the southeast near the border with Moldova at 48°29′16″N 27°34′07″E. The lower reservoir has a storage capacity of 70,000,000 m^{3} (56,750 acre⋅ft). Water pumped from this reservoir is placed in the upper reservoir which is formed by a 360° "liver"-shaped embankment dam. The upper reservoir has a 38,800,000 m^{3} (31,456 acre⋅ft) storage capacity. During periods of high energy demand, water is released from the upper reservoir back to the power station for generation. This process is routinely repeated and helps balance loads. The difference in the two reservoirs affords a hydraulic head of 135 m (443 ft).

While only 4 are currently operational, the power station will contain 7 324 MW reversible Francis turbine generators. Its installed capacity will be 2,268 MW when generating and during pumping, the power station will consume a maximum of 2,947 MW. Regulating flows into the lower reservoir is the Dniester HPP-I Dam which is located upstream, 9 kilometres (5.6 mi) north of the power plant at 48°35′37″N 27°27′10″E. HPP-I has its own power plant with an installed capacity of 702 MW and a storage capacity of 3,000,000,000 m^{3} (2,432,140 acre⋅ft). HPP-II has an installed capacity of 40.8 MW.

== See also ==
- Hydroelectricity in Ukraine
- List of power stations in Ukraine
- List of pumped-storage power stations
