= Dniester Hydroelectric Station =

Dnister Hydroelectric Station
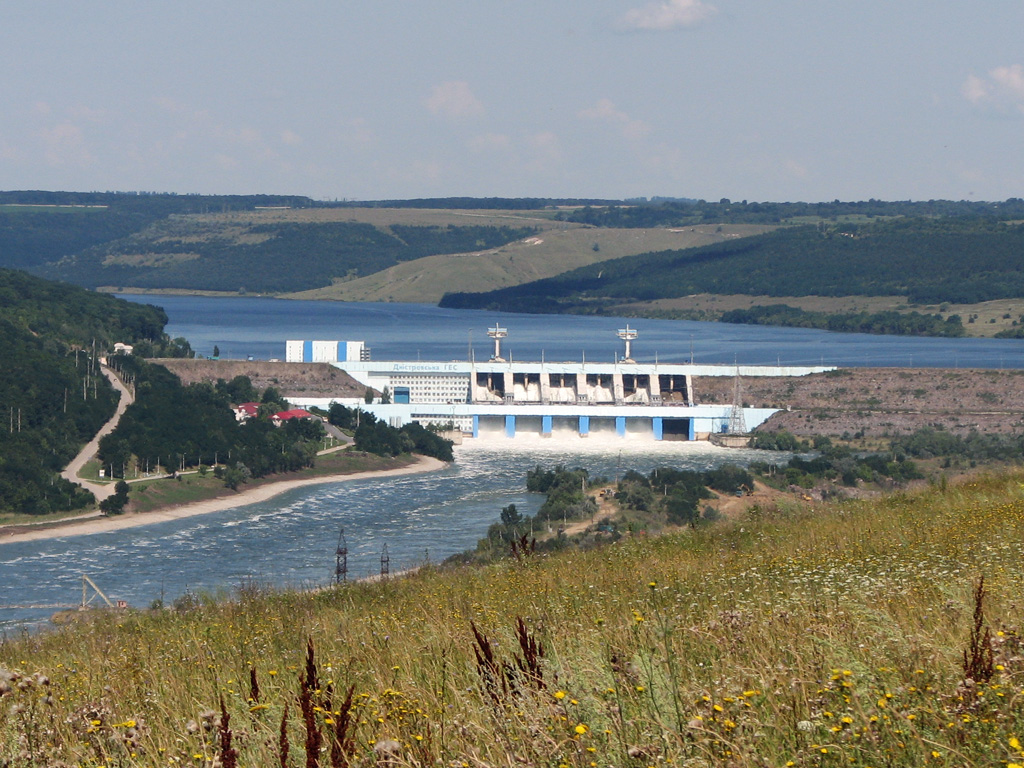

- Location of the Dnister Hydroelectric Station in Ukraine
- Official name: Дністровська ГЕС
- Country: Ukraine
- Location: Chernivtsi Oblast
- Coordinates: 48°35′36″N 27°27′18″E
- Status: Operational
- Construction began: 1973
- Opening date: 1981
- Owner: Government of Ukraine

Dam and spillways
- Type of dam: Gravity dam
- Impounds: Dnister River
- Height: 60 m (200 ft)
- Length: 870 m (2,850 ft)
- Spillways: 6
- Spillway capacity: 13,260 m^{3}/s (468,000 cu ft/s)

Reservoir
- Creates: Dnister reservoir
- Total capacity: 3 km^{3} (0.72 mi^{3})
- Surface area: 142 km^{2} (55 sq mi)
- Maximum water depth: 54 m (177 ft)

Power Station
- Operator: Ukrhydroenergo
- Commission date: 1981-1983
- Type: Conventional
- Turbines: 6 X 117 MW Kaplan-type
- Installed capacity: 702 MW

The Dnister HES (Ukrainian: Дністровська ГЕС, romanized: Dnistrovska HES) is a 702 MW hydroelectric power station at the Dnister near Novodnistrovsk, Ukraine. It was launched in commercial operation 1981. Both Dnister Hydroelectric Station and Dniester Pumped Storage Power Station are operated by Ukrhydroenergo and compose the Dnister Cascade of power stations. Dnister HES-2 is located downstream and has a 40.8 MW capacity.

== History ==
The decision to build a power plant was adopted by the Soviet Government in 1972. The following year, preparatory work started, and the main structures of the hydrocomplex began to be erected in 1975. The six turbines were commissioned in 1981–1983, two in each year. The building of the power plant led to the creation of a new town, Novodnistrovsk.

The power plant was renovated in 1998 with funding provided by the European Bank for Reconstruction and Development. Another round of renovations happened in 2006–2011.

The plant was attacked multiple times during the Russo-Ukrainian War. On the morning of 31 October 2022, Russian forces launched a massive missile strike on Ukraine's critical infrastructure, including a confirmed missile hit on the territory of the Dniester Hydroelectric Power Plant. More attacks took place in 2024 and 2026. The last attack resulted in Moldova declaring a 15-day environmental alert in the Dniester River basin after it caused an oil leakage that threatened the country's water supplies.

== Technical specifications ==
The length of the dam is 870 m (2,850 ft), the height is 60 m (200 ft), and the spillway capacity is 13,260 m^{3}/s (468,000 cu ft/s). The electricity is generated by six Kaplan turbines, each having a power of 117 MW, with the total being 702 MW. The annual generation of electricity is 865 GWh.

== Reservoir ==
The Dniester reservoir was created in 1981. It has a water surface area of 142 square kilometres (55 sq mi), a length of 194 km (121 mi), an average depth of 21 m (69 ft), and a maximum depth of 54 m (177 ft). The total volume of the reservoir is 3 km^{3} (0.72 cu mi), while the usable volume is 2 km^{3} (0.48 cu mi).

== Dniester HES-2 ==
The Dniester HES-2 is another power plant that belongs to the same integrated hydrocomplex as Dniester HES-1. Its construction started in 1982, the first turbine became operational in 1999, and the last one in 2002. Together, the three Kaplan turbines have 40.8 MW of power and produce 50 GWh of electricity yearly. The volume of its reservoir is 23.4 km^{3} (5.6 cu mi) and its surface area is 3.09 km^{2} (1.19 sq mi)

== See also ==
- Hydroelectricity in Ukraine
- Dubăsari Hydroelectric Power Plant – located downstream
- List of power stations in Ukraine
