= Livyntsi =

Village in Dniester Raion, Chernivtsi Oblast, Ukraine

Livyntsi Лівинці Levinți
- Location of Livyntsi Livyntsi (Ukraine)
- Coordinates: 48°24′29″N 26°36′29″E
- Country: Ukraine
- Oblast: Chernivtsi Oblast
- Raion: Dniester Raion
- Elevation: 185 m (607 ft)

Population (2001)
  - Total: 1,452
- Time zone: UTC+2 (EET)
  - Summer (DST): UTC+3 (EEST)
- Postal code: 60125
- Area code: +380 3732

Livyntsi (Ukrainian: Лівинці; Romanian: Levinți) is a village in Dniester Raion, Chernivtsi Oblast, Ukraine. It is the administrative centre of Livyntsi rural hromada, one of the hromadas of Ukraine.

Until 18 July 2020, Livyntsi was located in Kelmentsi Raion. The raion was abolished in July 2020 as part of the administrative reform of Ukraine, which reduced the number of raions of Chernivtsi Oblast to three. The area of Kelmentsi Raion was merged into Dniester Raion.

== Demographics ==
According to the 1989 census, the population of Livyntsi was 1,455 people, of whom 629 were men and 826 women.

Native language as of the Ukrainian Census of 2001:

- Ukrainian 98.76%
- Russian 0.76%
- Moldovan (Romanian) 0.41%
- Belarusian 0.07%
