= Vovchynets, Dniester Raion, Chernivtsi Oblast =

Commune in Chernivtsi Oblast, Ukraine

Coordinates: 48.4528°N 26.9128°E

Vovchynets (Ukrainian: Вовчинець; Romanian: Volcineți) is a village in Dniester Raion, Chernivtsi Oblast, Ukraine. It belongs to Kelmentsi settlement hromada, one of the hromadas of Ukraine.

Until 18 July 2020, Vovchynets belonged to Kelmentsi Raion. The raion was abolished in July 2020 as part of the administrative reform of Ukraine, which reduced the number of raions of Chernivtsi Oblast to four. The area of Kelmentsi Raion was merged into Dniester Raion.
