= Vashkivtsi, Dniester Raion, Chernivtsi Oblast =

Village in Dniester Raion, Chernivtsi Oblast, Ukraine

Vashkivtsi Вашківці Vășcăuți
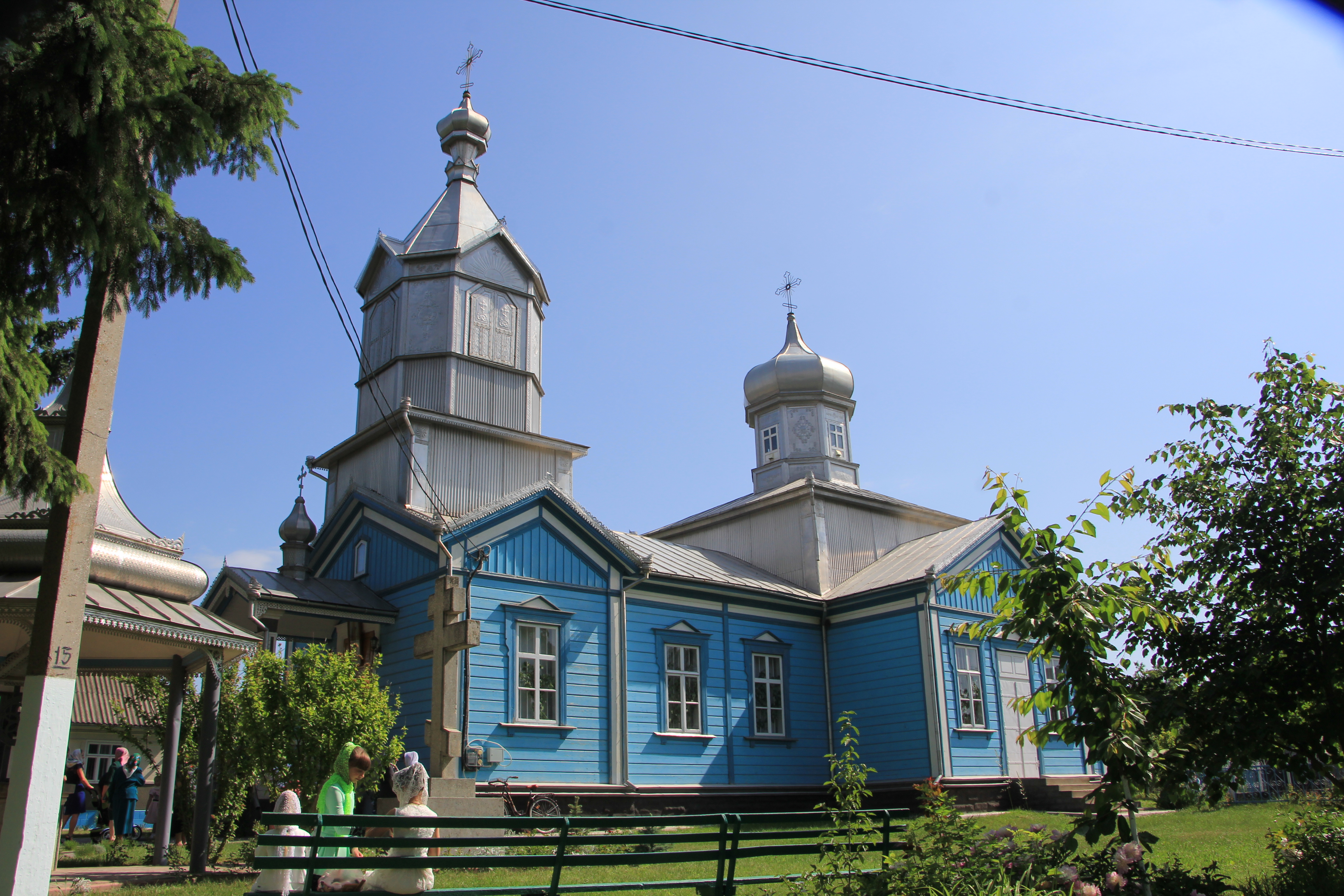
- A monument located in Vashkivtsi, Ukraine

- Location of Vashkivtsi Vashkivtsi (Ukraine)
- Coordinates: 48°24′21″N 27°07′37″E
- Country: Ukraine
- Oblast: Chernivtsi Oblast
- Raion: Dniester Raion
- Founded: 1651
- Elevation: 252 m (827 ft)

Population (2001)
  - Total: 3,577
- Time zone: UTC+2 (EET)
  - Summer (DST): UTC+3 (EEST)
- Postal code: 60222
- Area code: +380 3739

Vashkivtsi (Ukrainian: Вашківці; Romanian: Vășcăuți) is a village in Dniester Raion, Chernivtsi Oblast, Ukraine. It hosts the administration of Vashkivtsi rural hromada, one of the hromadas of Ukraine.

Until 18 July 2020, Vashkivtsi belonged to Sokyriany Raion. The raion was abolished in July 2020 as part of the administrative reform of Ukraine, which reduced the number of raions of Chernivtsi Oblast to three. The area of Sokyriany Raion was merged into Dniester Raion.

== Demographics ==
According to the 1989 census, the population of Vashkivtsi was 3,680 people, of whom 1,718 were men and 1,962 women.

Native language as of the Ukrainian Census of 2001:

- Ukrainian 97.18%
- Moldovan (Romanian) 1.62%
- Russian 1.12%
- Belarusian 0.06%
- Romanian 0.03%
