= Vovchynets =

Vovchynets may refer to several places in Ukraine:

- Vovchynets, Ivano-Frankivsk Oblast
- Vovchynets, Dniester Raion, Chernivtsi Oblast
- Vovchynets, Khmilnyk Raion
- Vovchynets, Vyzhnytsia Raion
