= N. M. Seedo =

Yiddish writer in London

Sonia Husid, known by her pen name N. M. Seedo, (1906 – 1985, also known as Sonya Khosid) was a Bessarabian-born Jewish writer and political activist, also known as the subject of a number of portraits by Leon Kossoff, painted during the course of a friendship lasting several decades in London after the Second World War. Her fictionalised autobiography In The Beginning Was Fear (1964) contains passages about Kossoff, although he is not named.

== Biography ==
Husid was born in 1906 in Secureni in the Governorate of Bessarabia, a province of the Russian Empire, now in Ukraine. Her brother was the poet and story-writer Mordecai Husid. She was educated at a Yiddish school, and later moved to Vienna, where she studied at a Hebrew pedagogical institute. She was a member of Hashomer Hatsair (The Young Guard), a secular Zionist youth movement. She later joined the Romanian Communist Party, then an illegal organisation, after returning to Bessarabia following the death of her father. Working underground as a Communist activist, she was detained and tortured by the Romanian army, after she tried to cross the border into the USSR. Following her release, she moved to London in 1930.

She contributed to several Yiddish periodicals, writing mainly on psychology and literature. In 1935, she married Yehuda Isamar Fuchs, who wrote novels under the pen name I. A. Lisky. In 1938/39, she was a member of the editorial team of the short-lived magazine Yiddish London, which only published two issues before the outbreak of the Second World War. In 1941, she published Di dialektik fun gefil un gedank (The Dialectic of Feeling and Thought), a full-length philosophical work in Yiddish, drawing on Jungian and Marxist theory to analyse the relationship between aesthetics and politics.

After the war, Husid published in English, including the fictionalised memoir In The Beginning Was Fear (1964), a novel based closely on her own life They Sacrifice To Moloch (1967), and a dialectical play, At The Teach-in. During this period, she was an important model for Kossoff. She and Lisky divorced, but the couple remarried in 1970.

According to the American scholar of Yiddish Dovid Katz, who was Lisky’s lodger in North London in the mid-1970s, Husid remained a Stalinist to the end of her life: “All the old Yiddish Leftists I had ever met were staunch anti-Stalinists. Not Seedo. She explained to me over hours that true revolutionaries must sadly disrupt all sorts of innocents in the course of reaching the better world”. Katz also recalls that Husid would argue fiercely with Lisky, who had once been firmly left-wing, but was by the 1970s a staunch Zionist. “After a few moments of civil discourse, she would start repeating: ‘Enoch Powell’. Lisky would respond: ‘Arafat!’ Then came the fight: She'd call him ‘Fashíst’, and he'd call her "Komuníst". After many hours they'd meet for a friendly evening drink with no politics mentioned.”

Husid died in 1985

== Works ==
- 1941: Di dialektik fun gefil un gedank (The Dialectic of Feeling and Thought), Israel Narodiczky & Sons, London, 1941
- 1964: In The Beginning Was Fear, Narod Press, London, 1964
- 1967: They Sacrifice to Moloch, Narod Press, London, 1967
- 1975: At The Teach-in: An Epistemological Play in Four Acts, Narod Press, London, 1975
