= Sokyriany Raion =

Former subdivision of Chernivtsi Oblast, Ukraine

Sokyriany Raion Сокирянський район
- Raion
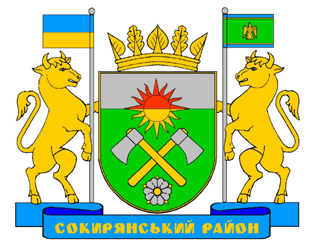
- Flag Coat of arms

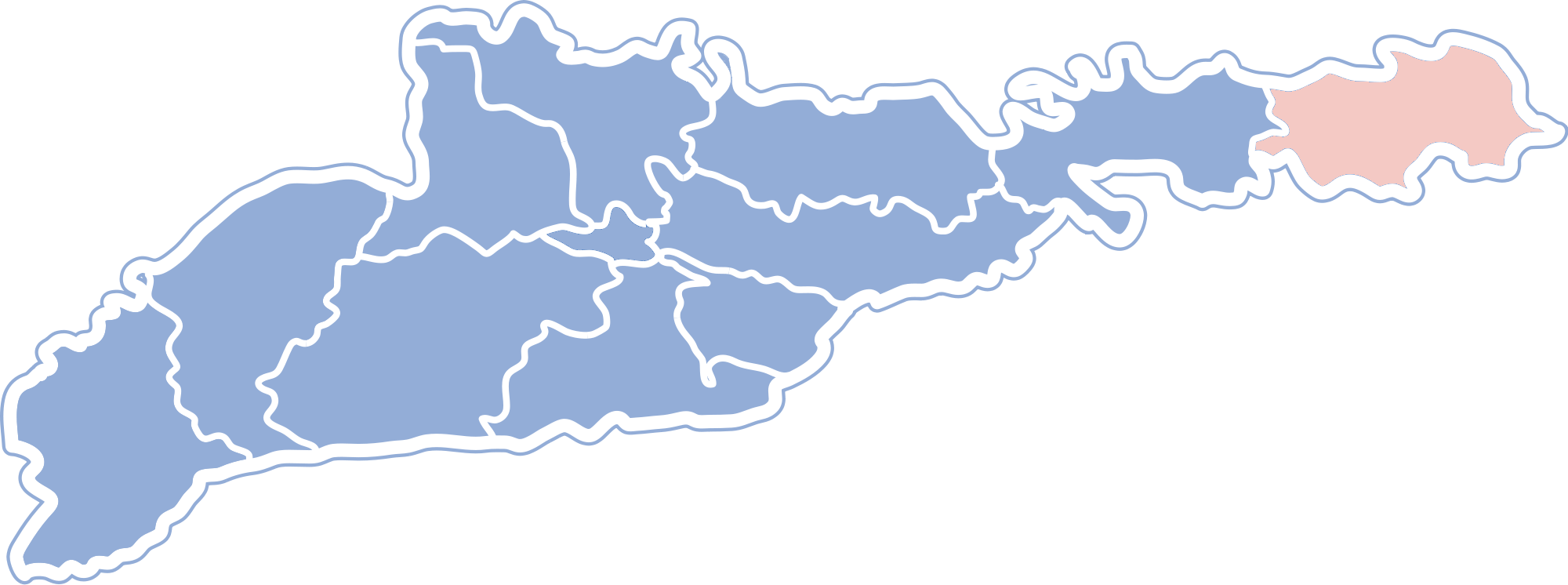
- Coordinates: 48°29′52″N 27°16′6″E
- Country: Ukraine
- Region: Chernivtsi Oblast
- Established: 1966
- Disestablished: 18 July 2020
- Admin. center: Sokyriany
- Subdivisions: List: — city councils; — settlement councils; — rural councils; Number of localities: — cities; — urban-type settlements; 28 — villages; — rural settlements

Area
  - Total: 661 km^{2} (255 sq mi)

Population (2020)
  - Total: 41,686
  - Density: 63.1/km^{2} (163/sq mi)
- Time zone: UTC+02:00 (EET)
  - Summer (DST): UTC+03:00 (EEST)
- Postal index: 602xx
- Area code: 380 3739
- Website: http://rda.cv.ua

Sokyriany Raion (Ukrainian: Сокирянський район) was an administrative raion (district) in the southern part of Chernivtsi Oblast in western Ukraine, on the Romanian border. It was part of the historical region of Bessarabia. The region had an area of 661 square kilometres (255 mi^{2}) and centers on the city of Sokyriany. The raion was abolished on 18 July 2020 as part of the administrative reform of Ukraine, which reduced the number of raions of Chernivtsi Oblast to three. The area of Sokyriany Raion was merged into Dniester Raion. The last estimate of the raion population was 41,686 (2020 est.)

At the time of disestablishment, the raion consisted of two hromadas, Sokyriany urban hromada with the administration in Sokyriany and Vashkivtsi rural hromada with the administration in the selo of Vashkivtsi.

== See also ==
- Subdivisions of Ukraine
