= List of Ukrainian oblasts and territories by population =

An estimate of the population of all Ukrainian oblasts and other territories was recorded in 2012. The war in Donbas, beginning in the spring of 2014, caused an estimated 1.5 million people from Donetsk Oblast and Luhansk Oblast to flee to Russia or other parts of Ukraine. Since the annexation of Crimea by the Russian Federation in March 2014, Crimea and Sevastopol have been disputed between Russia and Ukraine, with Russia signing a treaty of accession on 18 March 2014 with the self-declared independent Republic of Crimea, absorbing it into Russia, though this is not recognised by Ukraine or most of the international community.

Ranking	Oblast	Population (2022)	Population (2012)	Urban population (2012)	Rural population (2012)
1	Donetsk Oblast	4,059,372	4,387,702	3,973,317	414,385
2	Dnipropetrovsk Oblast	3,096,485	3,258,705	2,724,872	533,833
3	Kyiv	2,952,301	2,900,920	2,900,920	N/A
4	Kharkiv Oblast	2,598,961	2,720,342	2,193,027	527,315
5	Lviv Oblast	2,478,133	2,535,476	1,545,628	989,848
6	Odesa Oblast	2,351,392	2,387,282	1,592,602	794,680
7	Luhansk Oblast	2,102,921	2,263,676	1,963,808	299,868
8	Autonomous Republic of Crimea		1,963,770	1,231,648	732,122
9	Zaporizhzhia Oblast	1,638,462	1,755,663	1,355,126	400,537
10	Kyiv Oblast	1,795,079	1,731,673	1,077,600	654,073
11	Vinnytsia Oblast	1,509,515	1,604,270	813,906	790,364
12	Poltava Oblast	1,352,283	1,440,684	892,177	548,507
13	Ivano-Frankivsk Oblast	1,351,822	1,382,721	603,858	778,863
14	Khmelnytskyi Oblast	1,228,829	1,296,103	729,963	566,140
15	Zakarpattia Oblast	1,244,476	1,259,497	466,985	792,512
16	Zhytomyr Oblast	1,179,032	1,249,225	734,462	514,763
17	Cherkasy Oblast	1,160,744	1,246,166	707,539	538,627
18	Rivne Oblast	1,141,784	1,162,049	553,247	608,802
19	Mykolaiv Oblast	1,091,821	1,159,634	791,227	368,407
20	Sumy Oblast	1,035,772	1,115,051	764,436	350,615
21	Ternopil Oblast	1,021,713	1,066,523	475,443	591,080
22	Kherson Oblast	1,001,598	1,063,803	651,241	412,562
23	Chernihiv Oblast	959,315	1,047,023	676,001	371,022
24	Volyn Oblast	1,021,356	1,042,855	545,568	497,287
25	Kirovohrad Oblast	903,712	974,724	612,237	362,487
26	Chernivtsi Oblast	890,457	910,001	391,491	518,510
27	Sevastopol		509,992	509,992	N/A

== See also ==
- Subdivisions of Ukraine
- List of cities in Ukraine
