= Sokyriany urban hromada =

Urban hromada in Chernivtsi Oblast, Ukraine

Coordinates: 48°30′N 27°17′E

Sokyriany urban hromada Сокирянська міська громада
- Hromada
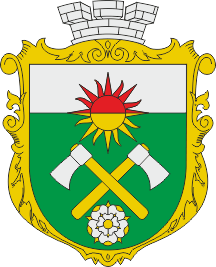
- Seal
- Interactive map of Sokyriany urban hromada
- Country: Ukraine
- Oblast: Chernivtsi
- Raion: Dniester

Area
  - Total: 82.16 km^{2} (31.72 sq mi)

Population (2018)
  - Total: 10,987
  - Density: 133.7/km^{2} (346.4/sq mi)
- Settlements: 25
- Cities: 1
- Villages: 24

Sokyriany urban territorial hromada (Ukrainian: Сокирянська міська територіальна громада, romanized: Sokyrianska miska terytorialna hromada) is a hromada of Ukraine, located in the country's western Chernivtsi Oblast. Its capital is the city of Sokyriany.

== Settlements ==
In addition to one city (Sokyriany), there are 24 villages within the hromada:

- Bilousivka
- Bratanivka
- Halytsia
- Hrubna
- Hvizdivtsi
- Kobolchyn
- Korman
- Kulishivka
- Lomachyntsi
- Lopativ
- Mykhalkove
- Neporotove
- Novooleksiivka
- Ozheve
- Oleksiivka
- Pokrovka
- Rozkopyntsi
- Romankivtsi
- Selyshche
- Serbychany
- Shebutyntsi
- Vasylivka
- Vitrianka
- Voloshkove
