= Kelmentsi settlement hromada =

Settlement hromada in Chernivtsi Oblast, Ukraine

Kelmentsi settlement hromada Кельменецька селищна громада
- Hromada
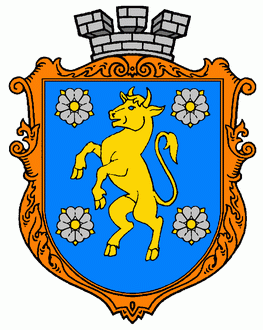
- Seal
- Interactive map of Kelmentsi settlement hromada
- Country: Ukraine
- Oblast: Chernivtsi
- Raion: Dniester

Area
  - Total: 540.6 km^{2} (208.7 sq mi)

Population (2023)
  - Total: 32,058
  - Density: 59.30/km^{2} (153.6/sq mi)
- Settlements: 26
- Villages: 25
- Towns: 1

Kelmentsi settlement territorial hromada (Ukrainian: Кельменецька селищна територіальна громада, romanized: Kelmenetska selyshchna terytorialna hromada) is a hromada of Ukraine, located in the country's western Chernivtsi Oblast. Its capital is the urban-type settlement of Kelmentsi.

Kelmentsi settlement hromada has an area of 540.6 km^{2} (208.7 mi^{2}). The population of the hromada is 30,275 (as of 2025).

== Settlements ==
In addition to one urban-type settlement (Kelmentsi), there are 25 villages within the hromada:

- Babyn
- Bernove
- Brayilivka
- Buzovytsia
- Burdiuh
- Vartykivtsi
- Vovchynets
- Voronovytsia
- Hrushivtsi
- Dnistrivka
- Ivanivtsi
- Komariv
- Konovka
- Lenkivtsi
- Lukachivka
- Maiorka
- Makarivka
- Moshanets
- Nahoriany
- Nelypivtsi
- Novoselytsia
- Perkivtsi
- Putryne
- Rososhany
- Slobidka
