= Kelmentsi =

Rural locality in Chernivtsi Oblast, Ukraine

Kelmentsi Кельменці Chelmenți (in Romanian)
- Rural settlement
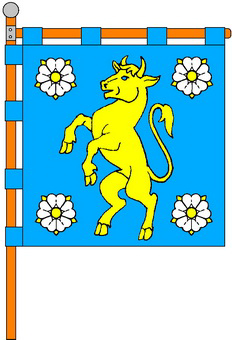
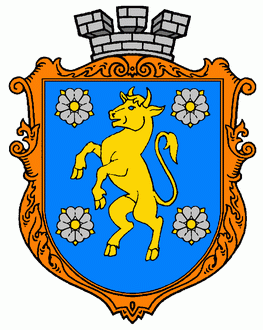
- Flag Coat of arms
- Interactive map of Kelmentsi
- Location of Kelmentsi in Ukraine Kelmentsi (Ukraine)
- Coordinates: 48°27′48″N 26°49′45″E
- Country: Ukraine
- Oblast: Chernivtsi Oblast
- Raion: Dniester Raion
- Hromada: Kelmentsi settlement hromada
- Founded: 1559
- Town status: 1960

Government
  - Mayor: Valentyn Tverdokhlib

Area
  - Total: 6.42 km^{2} (2.48 sq mi)

Population (2022)
  - Total: 6,985
  - Density: 1,090/km^{2} (2,820/sq mi)
- Time zone: UTC+2 (EET)
  - Summer (DST): UTC+3 (EEST)
- Postal code: 60100
- Area code: +380 3732

Kelmentsi (Ukrainian: Кельменці, IPA: [ˈkɛlʲments⁽ʲ⁾i]; Romanian: Chelmenți) is a rural settlement in Chernivtsi Oblast, western Ukraine. It serves as the administrative center of Dniester Raion, housing the local district administration buildings. It hosts the administration of Kelmentsi settlement hromada, one of the hromadas of Ukraine. Population: 6,985 (2022 estimate).

At the 2001 census, the town's population was 8,007, which consisted mostly of ethnic Ukrainians. Kelmentsi itself is located in close proximity to the border with Moldova.

== History ==
The settlement belongs to the historical region of Northern Bessarabia.

Starting in 1960, Kelmentsi was designated an urban-type settlement.

Until 18 July 2020, Kelmentsi served as an administrative center of Kelmentsi Raion. The raion was abolished in July 2020 as part of the administrative reform of Ukraine, which reduced the number of raions of Chernivtsi Oblast to three. The area of Kelmentsi Raion was merged into Dniester Raion.

On 26 January 2024, a new law entered into force which abolished the status of urban-type settlement, and Kelmentsi became a rural settlement.

== Notable people ==
- Nicolae Dan Cristescu (1929–2020), Romanian mathematician, member of the Romanian Academy (since 1992)
- Igor Plotnitsky (born 1964), Ukrainian separatist leader
- Yuriy Tkachuk (born 1995), footballer
