= Kelmentsi Raion =

Former subdivision of Chernivtsi Oblast, Ukraine

Kelmentsi Raion Кельменецький район
- Raion
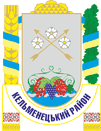
- Flag Coat of arms

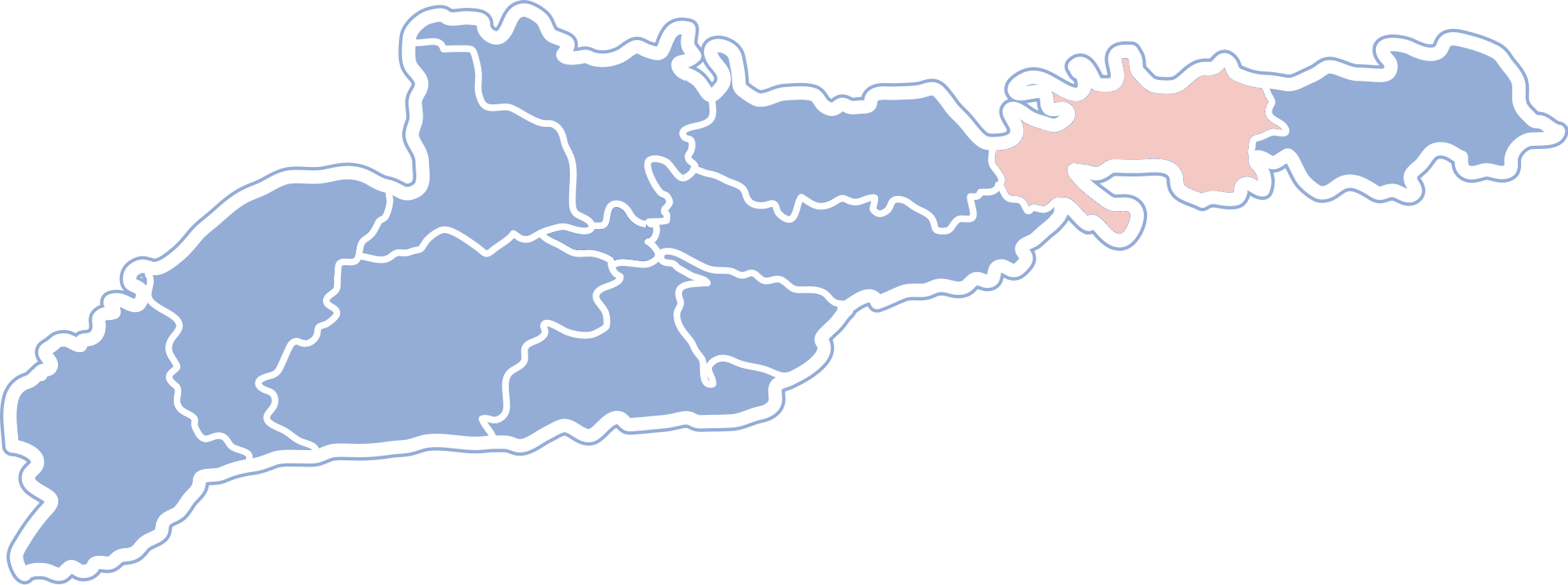
- Coordinates: 48°27′35″N 26°49′38″E
- Country: Ukraine
- Region: Chernivtsi Oblast
- Established: 1960
- Disestablished: 18 July 2020
- Admin. center: Kelmentsi
- Subdivisions: List: — city councils; — settlement councils; — rural councils; Number of localities: — cities; — urban-type settlements; 32 — villages; — rural settlements

Area
  - Total: 670 km^{2} (260 sq mi)

Population (2020)
  - Total: 39,157
  - Density: 58/km^{2} (150/sq mi)
- Time zone: UTC+02:00 (EET)
  - Summer (DST): UTC+03:00 (EEST)
- Postal index: 601xx
- Area code: 380 3732

Kelmentsi Raion (Ukrainian: Кельменецький район) was an administrative raion (district) in the southern part of Chernivtsi Oblast in western Ukraine, on the Romanian border, part of the historical region of Bessarabia. The administrative center was the urban-type settlement of Kelmentsi. The region had an area of 670 square kilometres (260 mi^{2}). The raion was abolished on 18 July 2020 as part of the administrative reform of Ukraine, which reduced the number of raions of Chernivtsi Oblast to three. The area of Kelmentsi Raion was merged into Dniester Raion. The last estimate of the raion population was 39,157 (2020 est.)

At the time of disestablishment, the raion consisted of two hromadas, Kelmentsi settlement hromada with the administration in Kelmentsi and Livyntsi rural hromada with the administration in the selo of Livyntsi.

== See also ==
- Subdivisions of Ukraine
