= Novodnistrovsk =

City in Chernivtsi Oblast, Ukraine

Novodnistrovsk Новодністровськ
- City
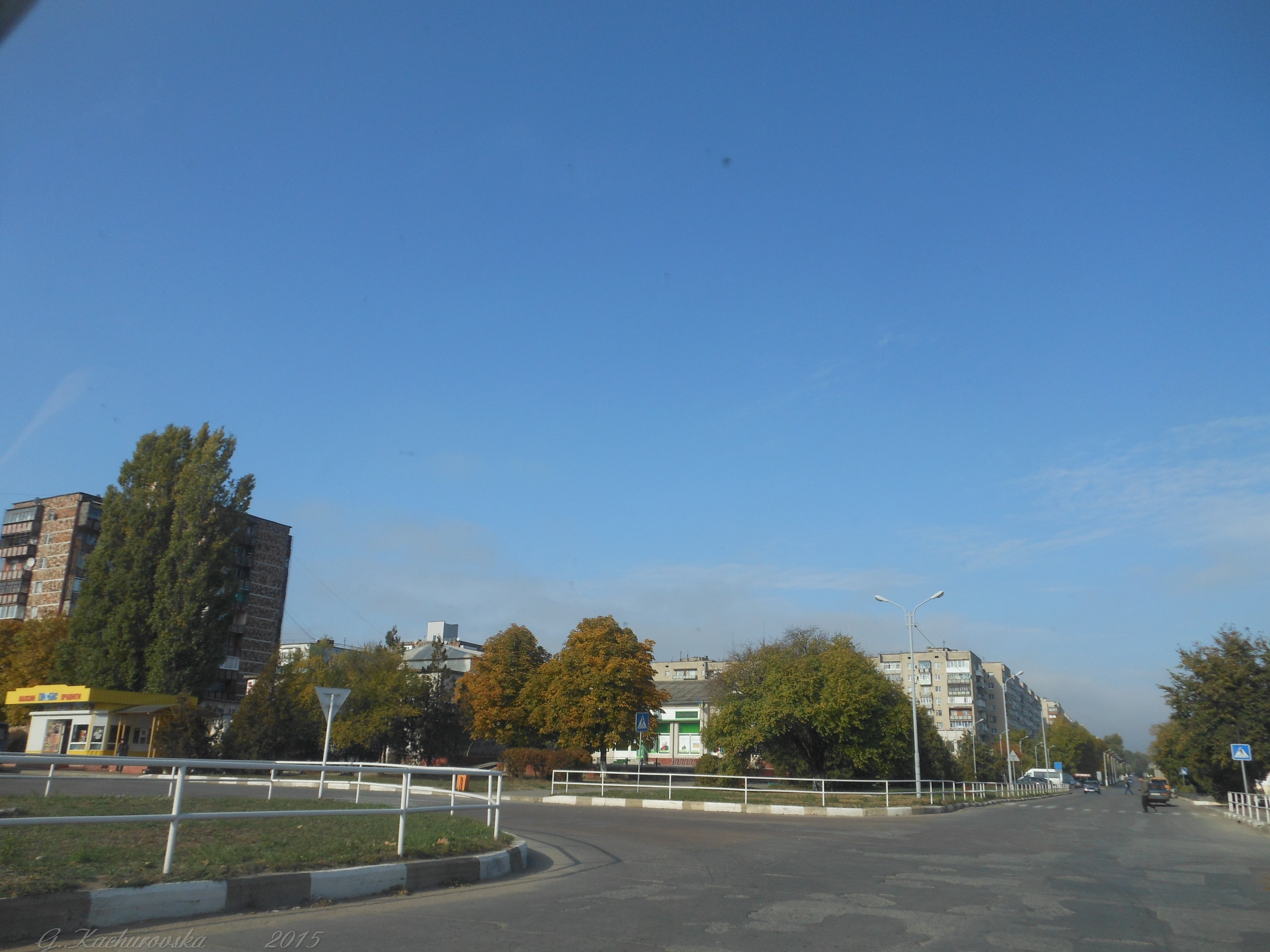
- A street in Novodnistrovsk

- Flag Coat of arms

- Location of Novodnistrovsk Novodnistrovsk (Ukraine)
- Coordinates: 48°34′40″N 27°26′29″E
- Country: Ukraine
- Oblast: Chernivtsi Oblast
- Raion: Dniester Raion
- Hromada: Novodnistrovsk urban hromada
- Established: 1973

Government
  - Mayor: Natalya Tsymbalyuk

Area
  - Total: 7.09 km^{2} (2.74 sq mi)

Population (2022)
  - Total: 10,463
  - Density: 1,480/km^{2} (3,820/sq mi)
- Time zone: UTC+2 (EET)
  - Summer (DST): UTC+3 (EEST)
- Postal code: 60236
- Area code: +380 3741
- Website: https://novod-rada.gov.ua/

Novodnistrovsk (Ukrainian: Новодністровськ, IPA: [ˌnɔwod⁽ʲ⁾n⁽ʲ⁾isˈtrɔu̯sʲk]) is a city in Dniester Raion, Chernivtsi Oblast (province) of Ukraine. Novodnistrovsk is located in the historical region of Bessarabia. Population: 10,463 (2022 estimate).

It is the center of Novodnistrovsk urban hromada.

== History ==
An urban-type settlement was founded on 6 April 1973.

In January 1989 the population was 10 511 people.

City since July 1993.

Until 18 July 2020, Novodnistrovsk was designated as a city of oblast significance and did not belong to any raion. As part of the administrative reform of Ukraine, which reduced the number of raions of Chernivtsi Oblast to three, the city was merged into Dniester Raion.

Novodnistrovsk hosts the Novodnistrovsk Hydroelectric Power Plant, which between 7 and 12 March 2026 were targeted by a series of Russian aerial attacks. The attacks caused contamination of Dniester which supplies majority of drinking water to Moldova downstream, which resulted in a diplomatic scandal between Moldova and Russia.
