= Sokyriany =

City in Chernivtsi Oblast, Ukraine

Sokyriany Сокиряни
- City
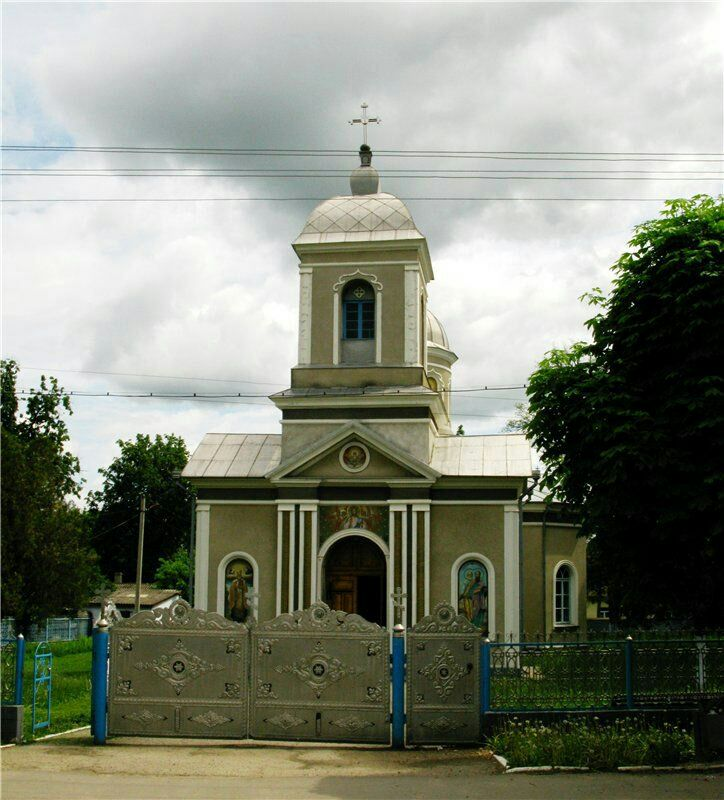
- Church of the Dormition of Theotokos

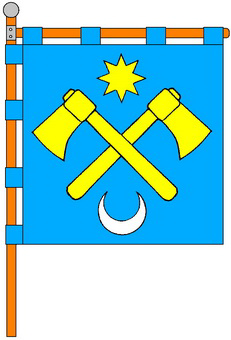
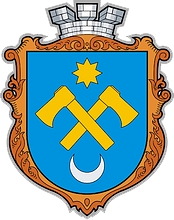
- Flag Coat of arms

- Location in Ukraine Sokyriany (Ukraine)
- Coordinates: 48°27′N 27°22′E
- Country: Ukraine
- Oblast: Chernivtsi Oblast
- Raion: Dniester Raion
- Hromada: Sokyriany urban hromada
- First mentioned: 1666
- City status: 1966

Government
  - Mayor: Vasyl Kozak

Area
  - Total: 57 sq mi (148 km^{2})

Population (2022)
  - Total: 8,547
  - Density: 150/sq mi (57.8/km^{2})
- Time zone: UTC+2 (EET)
  - Summer (DST): UTC+3 (EEST)
- Post code: 60200-07
- Area code: +380-3739

Sokyriany (Ukrainian: Сокиряни, IPA: [sokɪˈrʲɑnɪ]; Romanian: Târgu Secureni) is a small city in Dniester Raion, Chernivtsi Oblast (province) of Ukraine, Northern Bessarabia. It hosts the administration of Sokyriany urban hromada, one of the hromadas of Ukraine. Population: 8,547 (2022 estimate).

== History ==
Historical affiliations

Moldavia 1666–1711
Ottoman Empire 1711–1812
Russian Empire 1812–1917
Moldavian Democratic Republic 1917–1918
Kingdom of Romania 1918–1940
Soviet Union (Ukrainian SSR) 1940–1941
Kingdom of Romania 1941–1944
Soviet Union (Ukrainian SSR) 1944–1991
Ukraine 1991–present

The oldest written mention of Sokyriany dates back to 1666, when the Ottoman troops conquered Moldova and Bukovina. In the Middle Ages, Sokyriany were part of the Moldavian principality.

In January 1918, Soviet power was proclaimed in Sokyrian Oblast, and the confiscation of landlord lands began. In November 1918, Bessarabia, including the Sokiryan region, was occupied by Austro-German troops, thus royal Romania. After joining the USSR on November 12, 1940, the Bukovina Krai was formed Sokyryansky district.

In the 1960s, the territory of the Sokyrian region was part of the Kelmenets district. In the mid-1960s, Sokyryan district was restored within its previous administrative boundaries. City since 1966.

In January 1989, the population was 11 819 people.

In January 2013, the population was 9462 people.

Until 18 July 2020, Sokyriany served as an administrative center of Sokyriany Raion. The raion was abolished in July 2020 as part of the administrative reform of Ukraine, which reduced the number of raions of Chernivtsi Oblast to three. The area of Sokyriany Raion was merged into Dniester Raion.

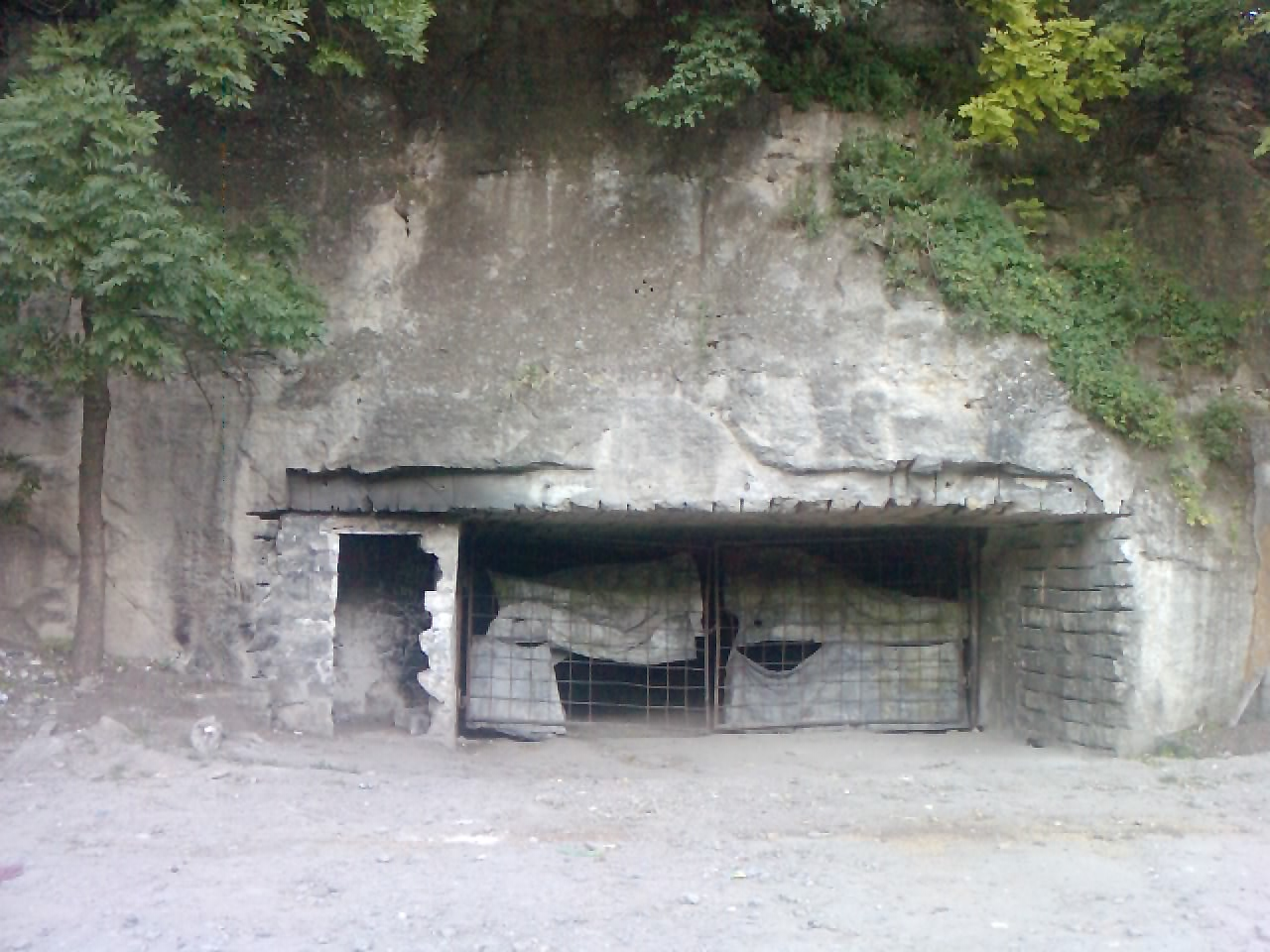
Sokyriany quarry
