= Chernivtsi Oblast =

Oblast (region) of Ukraine

Chernivtsi Oblast Чернівецька область
- Oblast
- Chernivetska oblast
- Flag Coat of arms
- Nickname: Bukovyna
- Coordinates: 48.28°N 26.01°E
- Country: Ukraine
- Established: August 9, 1940
- Administrative center: Chernivtsi
- Largest cities: Chernivtsi, Storozhynets, Novodnistrovsk

Government
  - Governor: Ruslan Osypenko
  - Oblast council: 64 seats
  - Chairperson: Mykola Guytor (acting)

Area
  - Total: 8,097 km^{2} (3,126 sq mi)
  - Rank: Ranked 25th

Population (2022)
  - Total: 890,457 ▼
  - Rank: Ranked 26th
  - Density: 110.0/km^{2} (284.8/sq mi)
  - Annual growth: −0.4%

GDP
  - Total: ₴ 55 billion (€1.4 billion)
  - Per capita: ₴ 61,088 (€1,600)
- Time zone: UTC+2 (EET)
  - Summer (DST): UTC+3 (EEST)
- Postal code: 58-60xxx
- Area code: +380-37
- ISO 3166 code: UA-77
- Vehicle registration: СЕ
- Raions: 11
- Cities: 11
- Settlements: 8
- Villages: 398
- HDI (2022): 0.722 high
- FIPS 10-4: UP03
- NUTS statistical regions of Ukraine: UA74
- Website: bukoda.gov.ua oblrada.cv.ua

Chernivtsi Oblast (Ukrainian: Чернівецька область, romanized: Chernivetska oblast), also referred to as Chernivechchyna (Чернівеччина), is an oblast (province) in western Ukraine, consisting of the northern parts of the historical regions of Bukovina and Bessarabia. It has an international border with Romania and Moldova. The region spans 8,100 square kilometres (3,100 sq mi). The oblast is the smallest in Ukraine both by area and population. It has a population of 890,457 (2022 estimate), and its administrative center is the city of Chernivtsi.

In 1408, Chernivtsi was a town in Moldavia and the chief centre of the area known as Bukovina. Chernivtsi later passed to the Turks and then in 1774 to the Habsburg monarchy. After World War I, it was ceded to Romania, and in 1940, the town was acquired by the Ukrainian SSR.

The oblast has a large variety of landforms: the Carpathian Mountains and picturesque hills at the foot of the mountains gradually change to a broad partly forested plain situated between the Dniester and Prut rivers.

== Geography ==
Chernivtsi Oblast covers an area of 8,097 km^{2} (3,126 sq mi). It is the smallest oblast in Ukraine, representing 1.3% of Ukrainian territory, and is only larger than the city of Kyiv itself.

In the oblast there are 75 rivers longer than 10 kilometers. The largest rivers are the Dniester (290 km, in the oblast), Prut (128 km, in the oblast) and Siret (113 km, in the oblast).

The oblast covers three geographic zones: a forest steppe region between Prut and Dnister rivers, a foothill region between the Carpathian Mountains and Prut river, and a mountain region known as the Bukovinian part of the Carpathian Mountains.

Chernivtsi Oblast is bordered by Ivano-Frankivsk Oblast, Ternopil Oblast, Khmelnytskyi Oblast, Vinnytsia Oblast, Romania, and Moldova. Within the oblast the national border of Ukraine with Romania extends 226 km, and with Moldova 198 km (123 mi).

== History ==
Chernivtsi oblast was created on August 7, 1940, in the wake of the Soviet occupation of Bessarabia and Northern Bukovina. The oblast was organized out of the northeast part of Ținutul Suceava of Kingdom of Romania, joining parts of three historical regions: northern half of Bukovina, northern half of the Hotin County county of Bessarabia, and Hertsa region, which was part of the Dorohoi county (presently Botoșani County) of proper Moldavia.

Archaeological sites in the region date back to 43,000–45,000 BC, with finds including a mammoth bone dwelling from the Middle Paleolithic. The Cucuteni-Trypillian culture flourished in the area. In the Middle Ages, the region was inhabited by East Slavic tribes White Croats and Tivertsi. From the end of the 10th century, it became a part of the Kievan Rus', then Principality of Halych, and in the mid-14th century of the Principality of Moldavia (which in the 16th century became a vassal of the Ottoman Empire). In 1775, two counties of Moldavia, since then known as Bukovina, were annexed by the Habsburg monarchy as part of the Austrian Empire and its final iteration Austria-Hungary. In 1812, one half of Moldavia, since then known as Bessarabia, was annexed by the Russian Empire. Hertsa region remained in Moldavia until its union with Wallachia in 1859, a union which in 1881 became the Kingdom of Romania. In 1918 both provinces of Bukovina and Bessarabia united with the Kingdom of Romania.

The Soviet occupation began on June 28, 1940. In addition to Bessarabia, the USSR demanded Northern Bukovina as compensation for the occupation of Bessarabia by Romania from 1918 to 1940. Hertsa region was not included in the demands that the Soviet Union addressed to Romania, but was occupied at the same time. Most of the occupied territories were organized on August 2, 1940, as the Moldavian Soviet Socialist Republic, while the remainder, including the Chernivtsi Oblast, which was formed on August 7, 1940, were included in the Ukrainian Soviet Socialist Republic.

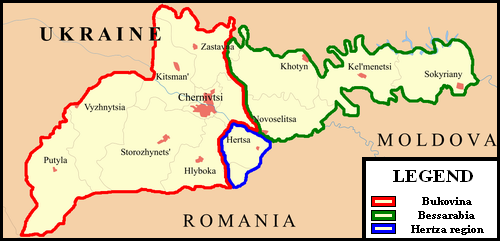
Historical regions outlined: red: Northern Bukovina, blue: Hertsa region, green: Northern Bessarabia

Throughout 1940–1941 several tens of thousands of Bukovinians were deported to Siberia and Kazakhstan, some 13,000 of them on June 13, 1941, alone. The total number of deportees from Soviet Moldova to Siberia in June 1941 and of people eligible for deportation who were not deported was 31,699, while 8,374 were deported or eligible for deportation from the Chernivtsi oblast of Ukraine and 3,767 from the Izmail oblast of Ukraine (southern Bessarabia); the total was 43,840. According to Bougai, 22,643 individuals from Soviet Moldova were deported in September 1941. The number of inhabitants deported during the night of June 12/13, 1941, from the Chernivtsi Oblast was 7,720. Only 1,136 of those deported from the Izmail oblast were still alive in Western Siberia, in the Tomsk region, in 1951, but others were sent to other places. The number of deportees to the Soviet north and east from the Hertsa raion in its boundaries from early 2020 of the Chernivtsi oblast on June 13, 1941, was 1,373; 219 (15.95%) of them would later die in Siberia and Kazakhstan. Among the 1,373 deportees from Hertsa Raion, 120 were of unknown nationality; among the 1,253 people whose nationality was known, 1090 (86.99%) were ethnic Romanians, 125 were ethnic Jews (9.98%), 31 were ethnic Ukrainians (2.474%), 4 were ethnic Russians (0.32%), 2 were ethnic Germans (0.02%) and 1 was ethnically Polish (0.08%). The number of inhabitants of the Chernivtsi Oblast who were deported to Siberia and Kazakhstan was 7,720 (2,279 families). According to some sources, most of the deportees of June 1941 from the Chernivtsi oblast, who were of many ethnicities, did not return from the Soviet east. However, the fragmentary, locality-by-locality, evidence indicates that most of the deportees from 1941 survived. According to Dr. Avigdor Schachan, who wrote a book about the Transnistrian ghettos, and was himself brought up in the Bessarabian part of the present-day Chernivtsi Oblast of Ukraine, about 2,000 northern Bukovinian and 4,000 Bessarabian Jews were deported to the Soviet east. About half of the Jews deported from Bessarabia to the Soviet east survived and returned to Bessarabia, and the rest did not return, according to a source mentioned by Jean Ancel (Matathias Carp), the specialist on the Holocaust in Romania and Transnistria; however, Carp's estimate is not confirmed by other sources. This and later deportations were primarily based on social class difference, it targeted intellectuals, people employed previously by the state, businessmen, clergymen, students, railworkers. In the winter and spring of 1941, the Soviet troops (NKVD) opened fire on many groups of locals trying to cross the border into Romania. Between September 17 and November 17, 1940, by a mutual agreement between USSR and Germany, 43,641 "ethnic Germans" from the Chernivtsi region were moved to Germany, although the total ethnic German population was only 34,500, and of these some 3,500 did not go to Germany.

Beginning with 1941, when the region returned under the control of the Romanian administration, the Jewish community of the area was largely destroyed by the deportations to Transnistria, where about 60% of the Jewish deportees from the area died. About 60% of the Jewish deportees to Transnistria from the city of Chernivtsi in 1941 and 1942 died there according to the Jewish Virtual Library. According to Gali Mir-Tibon, most of the Jews deported from the city of Chernivtsi, and northern Bukovina in general, to Transnistria did not survive. Despite the anti-Semitic policies of the Ion Antonescu's government of Romania, the mayor of Cernăuți, Traian Popovici, now honored by Israel's Yad Vashem memorial as one of the Righteous Among the Nations, saved approximately 20,000 Jews.

In 1944, when the Soviet troops returned to Bukovina, many inhabitants fled to Romania, and Soviet persecutions resumed. In demographic terms, these war-time and post-war-time factors changed the region's ethnic composition. Today the number of Jews, Germans and Poles is negligible, while the number of Romanians has decreased substantially. In March 1945, 3,967 Romanian citizens from Ukraine (excluding Jews), mostly from the Chernivtsi Oblast, were sent to the Soviet east. According to Nikolai Bougai, in March 1945, 12,852 Jews from 5,420 families with both Romanian and Soviet passports living in Ukraine, mostly originating from the Chernivtsi oblast, were relocated (as Jews) by the NKVD to the Soviet north and east.

On October 11, 1942, the (Soviet) State Committee on Defense decided to extend the decrees on "the mobilization of the NKVD labour columns, German men, able to work, 17–50 years old – to the persons of other nations, being in war with USSR-Romanians, Hungarians, Italians, Finns."; the order was signed by Stalin. As a result, in May 1944, in the village of Molodiia and some other northern Bukovinian localities, those men who declared a "Moldovan" nationality were incorporated into the Soviet army, while those who declared a "Romanian" nationality were sent to the work camps in the area of Lake Onega, where most of them died. The Soviet era dominance of the "Moldovan" identity in parts of northern Bukovina was due to the fact that the inhabitants of the Chernivtsi and Sadagura rural raions, and of the Bukovinian part of the Novoselytsia raion, were pressured in 1944 to adopt a "Moldovan" national/ethnic identity. In March 1945, 3,967 ethnic Romanians from Ukraine, mostly from the Chernivtsi Oblast, were sent to the Soviet east.

Ruthenian communities in Bukovina date back to at least 16th century. In 1775, Ukrainians (Ruthenians) represented some 8,000 out of a 75,000 population of Bukovina. By 1918, as a result of immigration of Ukrainian peasants from nearby villages in Galicia and Podolia, there were over 200,000 Ukrainians, out of a total of 730,000. Most of Ukrainians settled in the northern parts of Bukovina. Their number was especially large in the area between the Dniester and Prut rivers, where they became a majority. A similar process occurred in Northern Bessarabia. Throughout the history of the region, there were no inter-ethnic clashes, while the city of Chernivtsi was known for its German-style architecture, for a highly cultivated society, and for ethnic tolerance. Small ethnic disputes were, however, present on occasion. In 1918, many Ukrainians in Bukovina wanted to join an independent Ukrainian state. After an initial period of free education in Ukrainian language, in late 1920s Romanian authorities attempted to switch all education to the Romanian language. After 1944 Ukrainian anti-Soviet resistance rose up, Romanians and Ukrainians fought alongside against NKVD.

Many Ukrainians in the south-western mountain area of the Chernivtsi region belong to the Hutsul ethnic sub-group, a sophisticated cultural community inhabiting an area in the Carpathian Mountains in both Ukraine and Romania.

When the Soviet Union collapsed, Chernivtsi Oblast, then part of the Ukrainian SSR, became part of the newly independent (August 24, 1991) Ukraine. It has a Ukrainian ethnic majority. In the referendum on December 1, 1991, 92% of the oblast's residents supported the independence of Ukraine, with wide support from both Ukrainians and Romanians.

== Subdivisions ==
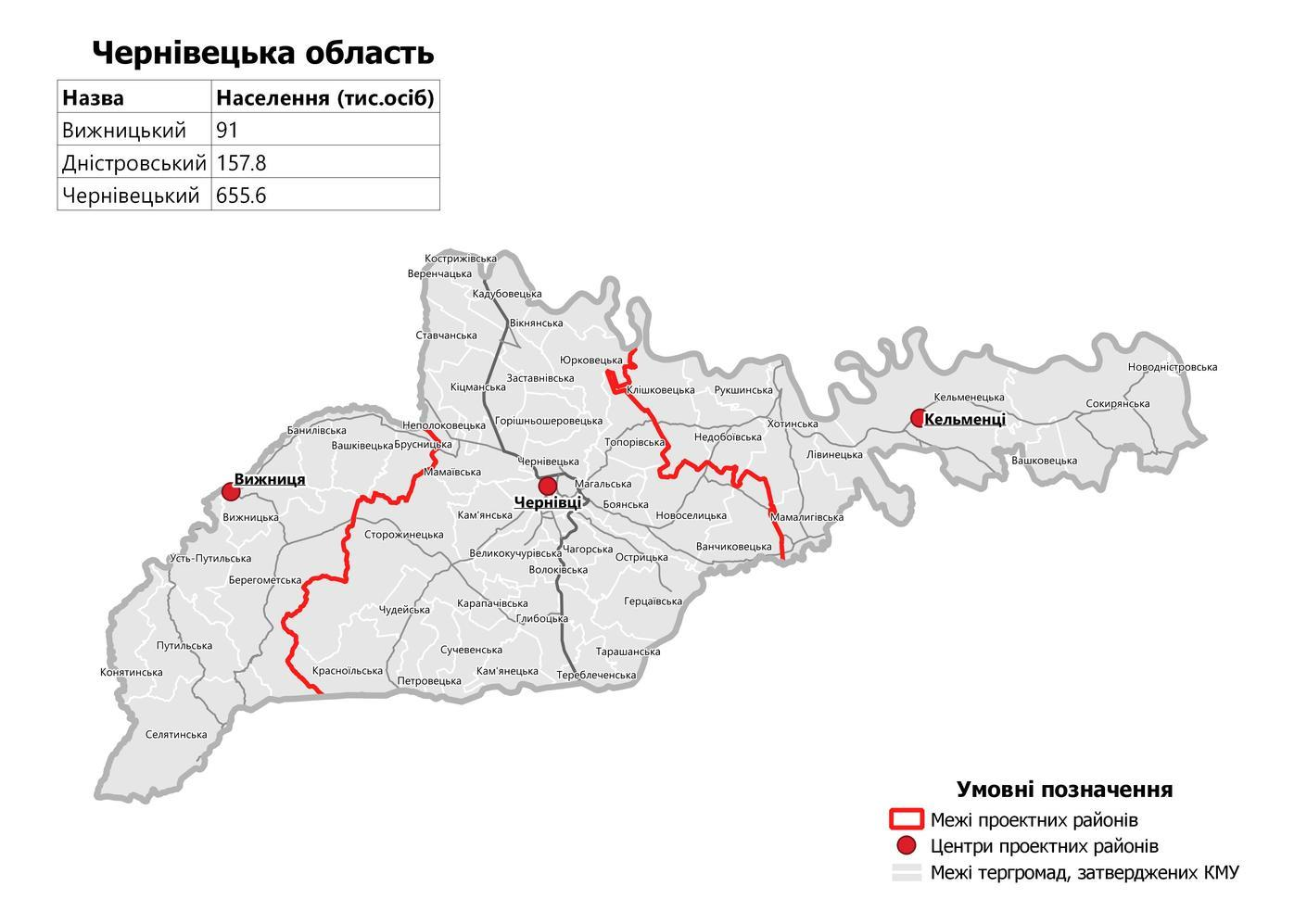
Map of Chernivtsi Oblast

Since July 2020, Chernivtsi Oblast is administratively subdivided into 3 raions (districts). These are

- Chernivtsi Raion;
- Dniester Raion;
- Vyzhnytsia Raion.

At the locality level, the territory of the oblast is divided among 11 cities, 8 urban-type settlements, and 252 communes.

== Population and demographics ==
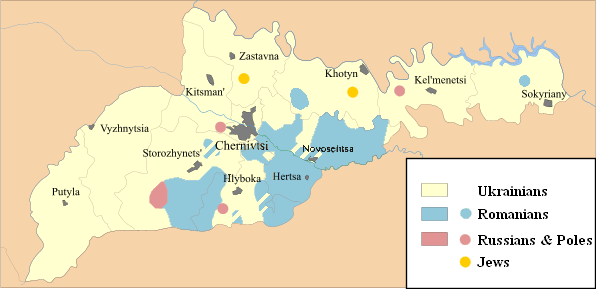
Ethnic divisions in Chernivtsi Oblast at the end of the Soviet Period , with Ukrainians, Romanians, Russians and Jewish areas depicted in white, blue, red, and yellow respectively. Note that the Moldovans, which represented 9% of the region's population according to the last Soviet census (1989), are shown as Romanians.

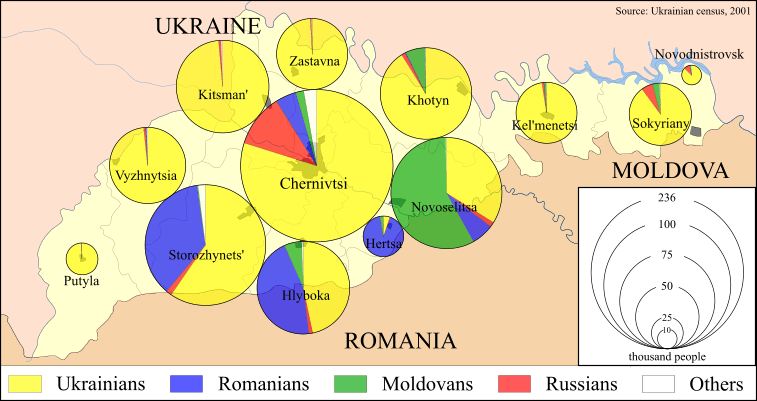
Ethnic division of the Chernivtsi Oblast according to the latest 2001 Ukrainian census results. Areas inhabited by Ukrainians, Romanians, Moldovans, Russians, and other ethnicities are depicted in yellow, blue, green, red, and white respectively. Circle sizes represent total population size in each area. Romanians and Moldovans form a single ethnic group.

Largest settlements in the region
#	City	Population
1	Chernivtsi	240,621 (2001)
2	Storozhynets	14,693 (2001)
3	Khotyn	11,216 (2001)
4	Novodnistrovsk	10,342 (2001)
5	Sokyriany	10,258 (2001)

According to the latest Ukrainian Census (2001), Ukrainians represent 74.98% (689,056) of the population of Chernivtsi Oblast out of 919,028 inhabitants. Moreover, 12.46% (114,555) reported themselves as Romanians, 7.31% (67,225) as Moldovans, and 4.12% (37,881) as Russians. The other nationalities, such as Poles, Belarusians, and Jews sum up to 1.2%. According to the 2001 census, the majority of the population of the Chernivtsi region was Ukrainian-speaking (75.57%), and there were also Romanian (18.64%) and Russian (5.27%) speakers. In the last Soviet census of 1989, out of 940,801 inhabitants, 666,095 declared themselves Ukrainians (70.8%), 100,317 Romanians (10.66%), 84,519 Moldovans (8.98%), and 63,066 Russians (6.7%). The decline in the number (from 84,519 to 67,225) and proportion of Moldovans (from 8.98% to 7.31%) was explained by a switch from a census Moldovan to a census Romanian ethnic identity, and has continued after the 2001 census. By contrast, the number of self-identified ethnic Romanians has increased and so has their proportion of the population of the oblast (from 10.66% to 12.46%), and the process has continued after the 2001 census.

A 2015 survey found that 86% of respondents ascribed to the Orthodox church while 2% ascribed to Greek Catholic. Another 5% was "unspecified Christian."

The use of separate categories for the Moldovans and Romanians, as well as for the Moldovan and Romanian languages in the Ukrainian census has been criticized by various Romanian organizations in Ukraine, including the Romanian Community of Ukraine Interregional Union. Furthermore, it was alleged that individuals, especially, but not exclusively, in the Odessa region were threatened with dismissal from their jobs if they declared that they were "Romanians" rather than "Moldovans", and it was also claimed that the ethnicity of some individuals was listed arbitrarily by census-takers who did not even ask those individuals what their ethnicity was. Nevertheless, all census respondents had to write in their ethnicity (no predetermined set of choices existed), and could respond or not to any particular census question, or not answer any questions at all.

According to Kateryna Sheshtakova, a professor at the Pomeranian University of Slutsk in Poland who did field research among 15 self-identified Romanians and self-identified Moldovans in the Chernivtsi region of Ukraine, 'Some Moldovans use both names of the mother tongue (Moldovan or Romanian) and accordingly declare two ethnic affiliations.' Opinion polling from the Chernivtsi oblast, as well as the discussions of the delegates of the Meeting of the Leaders of the Romanophone Organizations from Ukraine of December 6, 1996, indicated that many of the self-identified Moldovans believed that the Moldovan and Romanian languages were identical. Shestakova suggests that those self-identified Moldovans who see differences between Moldovan and Romanian tend to be from "the older generation". More information on the Romanian identity population and Moldovan identity population in Ukraine, including in the Chernivtsi oblast, and including detailed statistical data, may be found in the articles Romanians in Ukraine, Moldovans in Ukraine and Moldovenism.

According to the Romanian census of 1930, the territory of the future Chernivtsi Oblast had 805,642 inhabitants in that year, out of which 47.6% were Ukrainians, and 28.2% were Romanians. The rest of the population was 88,772 Jews, 46,946 Russians (among them an important community of Lipovans), around 35,000 Germans, 10,000 Poles, and 10,000 Hungarians.

During the inter-war period, Cernăuți County had a population of 306,975, of which 136,380 were Ukrainians, and 78,589 were Romanians. Storojineţ County had 77,382 Ukrainians and 57,595 Romanians. (The three other counties of Bukovina, which remained in Romania, had a total of 22,368 Ukrainians). The northern part of the Hotin County had approximately 70% Ukrainians and 25% Romanians. The Hertsa region, smaller by area and population, was virtually 100% Romanian.

Major demographic changes occurred during the Second World War. Immediate after the Soviet takeover of the region in 1940 the Soviet government deported or killed about 41,000 Romanians (see Fântâna Albă massacre), while at the same time further encouraging an influx of Ukrainians from the Ukrainian SSR. Most Poles were deported by the Soviet authorities, while most Germans forcibly returned to Germany. After the Kingdom of Romania took control of the region during the war (1941–1944), the Jewish community of the area was largely destroyed by the deportations to ghettos and concentration camps.

The languages of the population closely reflect the ethnic composition with over 90% within each of the major ethnic groups declaring their national language as the mother tongue.

National Structure of Chernivtsi Oblast (2001 Census)
Raions/Cities	Total	Ukrainians	Russians	Romanians	Moldovans	Other
Hertsa Raion	32,316	1,616	299	29,554	756	91
Hlyboka Raion	72,676	34,025	877	32,923	4,425	426
Kelmentsi Raion	48,468	47,261	607	25	477	98
Khotyn Raion	72,398	66,060	927	59	5,102	250
Kitsman Raion	72,884	71,805	674	116	88	201
Novoselytsia Raion	87,461	29,703	1,235	5,904	50,329	290
Putyla Raion	25,352	25,182	98	19	20	33
Sokyriany Raion	48,889	43,927	3,044	43	1,681	194
Storozhynets Raion	95,295	56,786	1,367	35,095	307	1,740
Vyzhnytsia Raion	59,993	58,924	631	196	58	184
Zastavna Raion	56,261	55,733	335	38	55	100
city of Chernivtsi	236,691	189,021	26,733	10,553	3,829	6,555
city of Novodnistrovsk	10,344	9,013	1,054	30	98	149
Total	919,028	689,056	37,881	114,555	67,225	10,311

=== Age structure ===
0–14 years: 16.7% ▲ (male 77,507/female 73,270)
15–64 years: 69.7% (male 304,793/female 325,677)
65 years and over: 13.6% ▼ (male 41,980/female 80,871) (2013 official)

=== Median age ===
total: 36.9 years ▲
male: 34.5 years ▲
female: 39.4 years ▲ (2013 official)

== Attractions ==
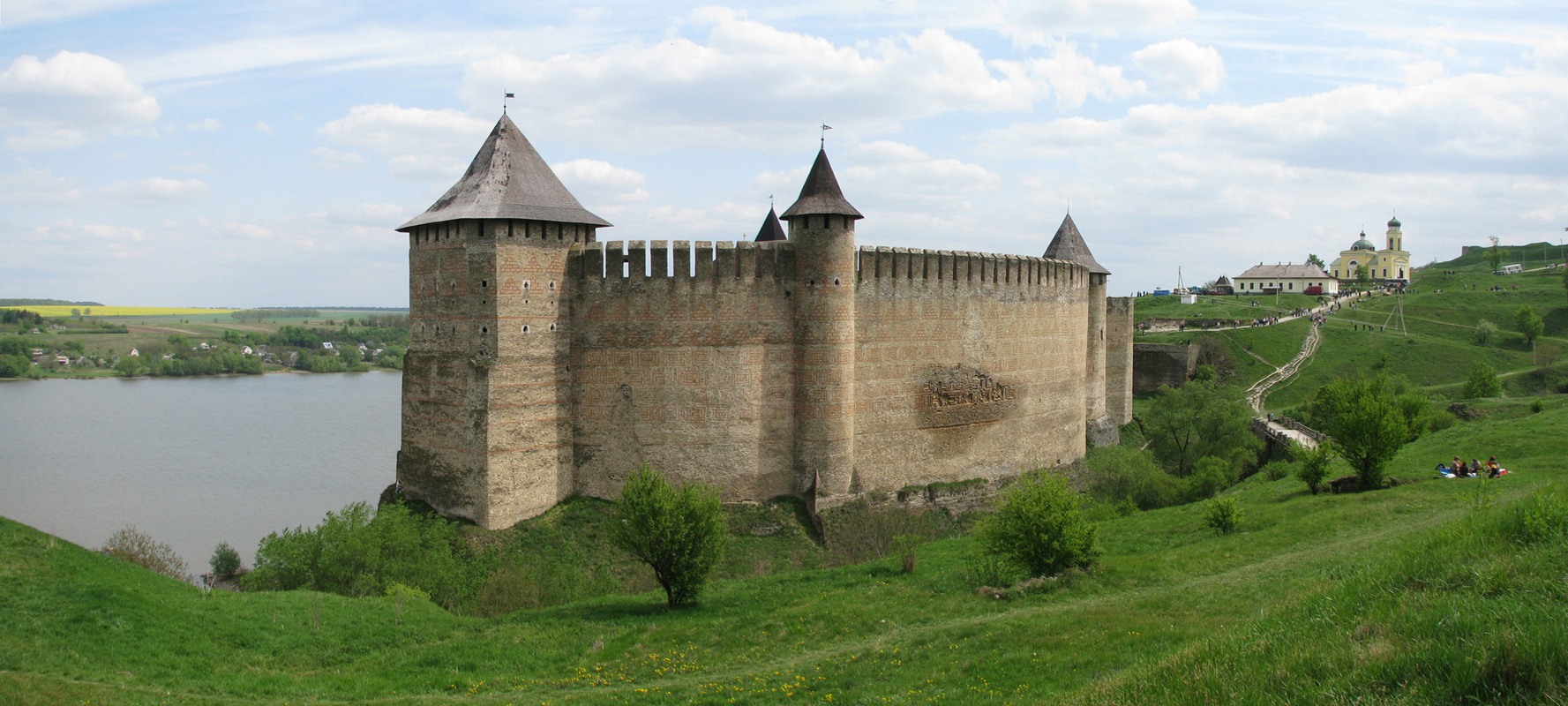
Khotyn Fortress

On the territory of the Chernivtsi Oblast there are 836 archaeological monuments (of which 18 are nationally significant), 586 historic monuments (2 national), 779 monuments of architecture and urban planning (112 national), and 42 monuments of monumental art. There are 110 monuments of national significance in Chernivtsi Oblast.

- Residence of Bukovinian and Dalmatian Metropolitans, UNESCO World Heritage Site
- Khotyn Fortress State Historic and Architectural Reserve
- Chernivtsi architectural complex of Olha Kobylianska Street
- Several archaeological sites of Trajan's Wall

== Gallery ==
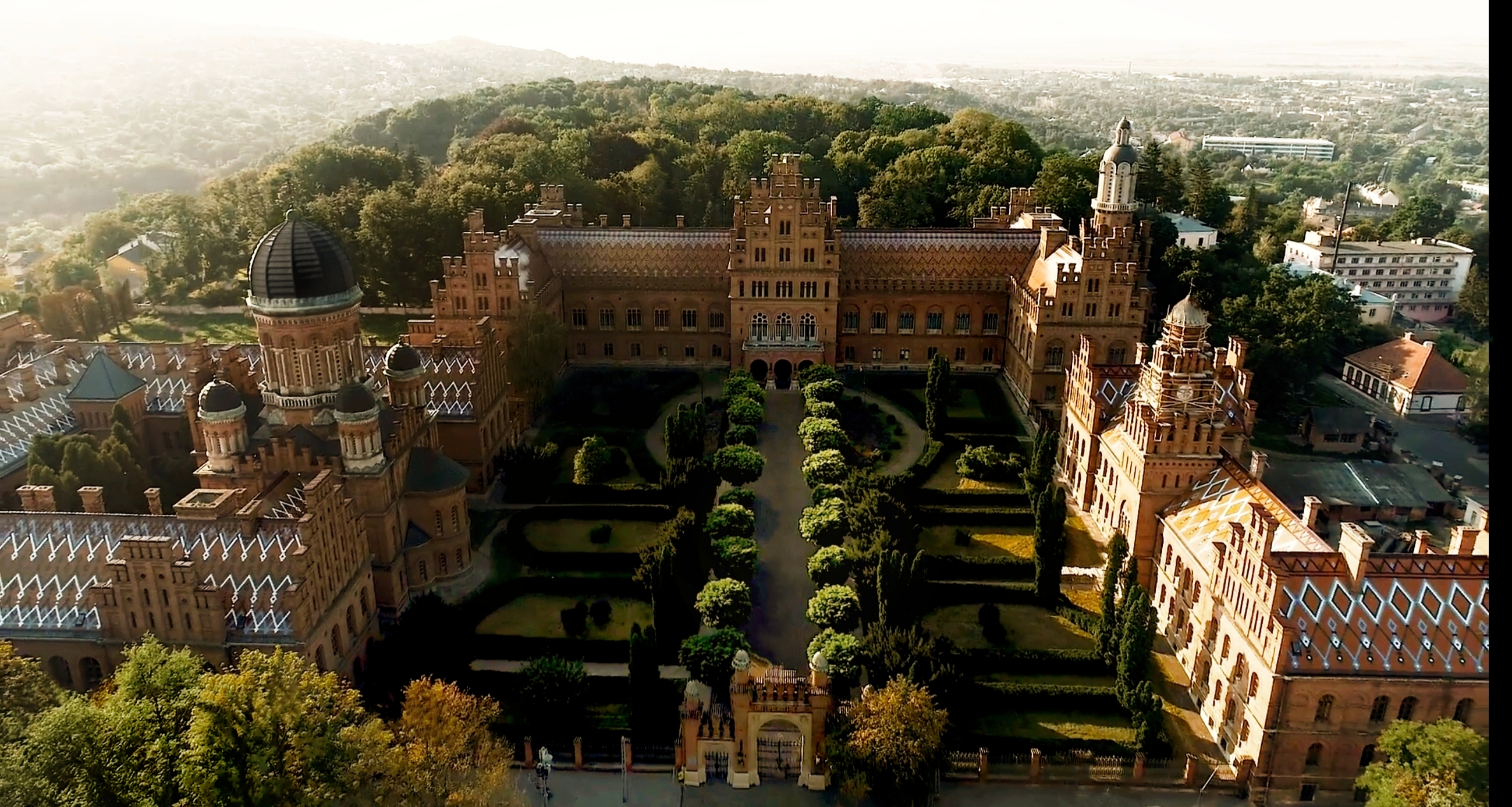
Residence of Bukovinian and Dalmatian Metropolitans in Chernivtsi

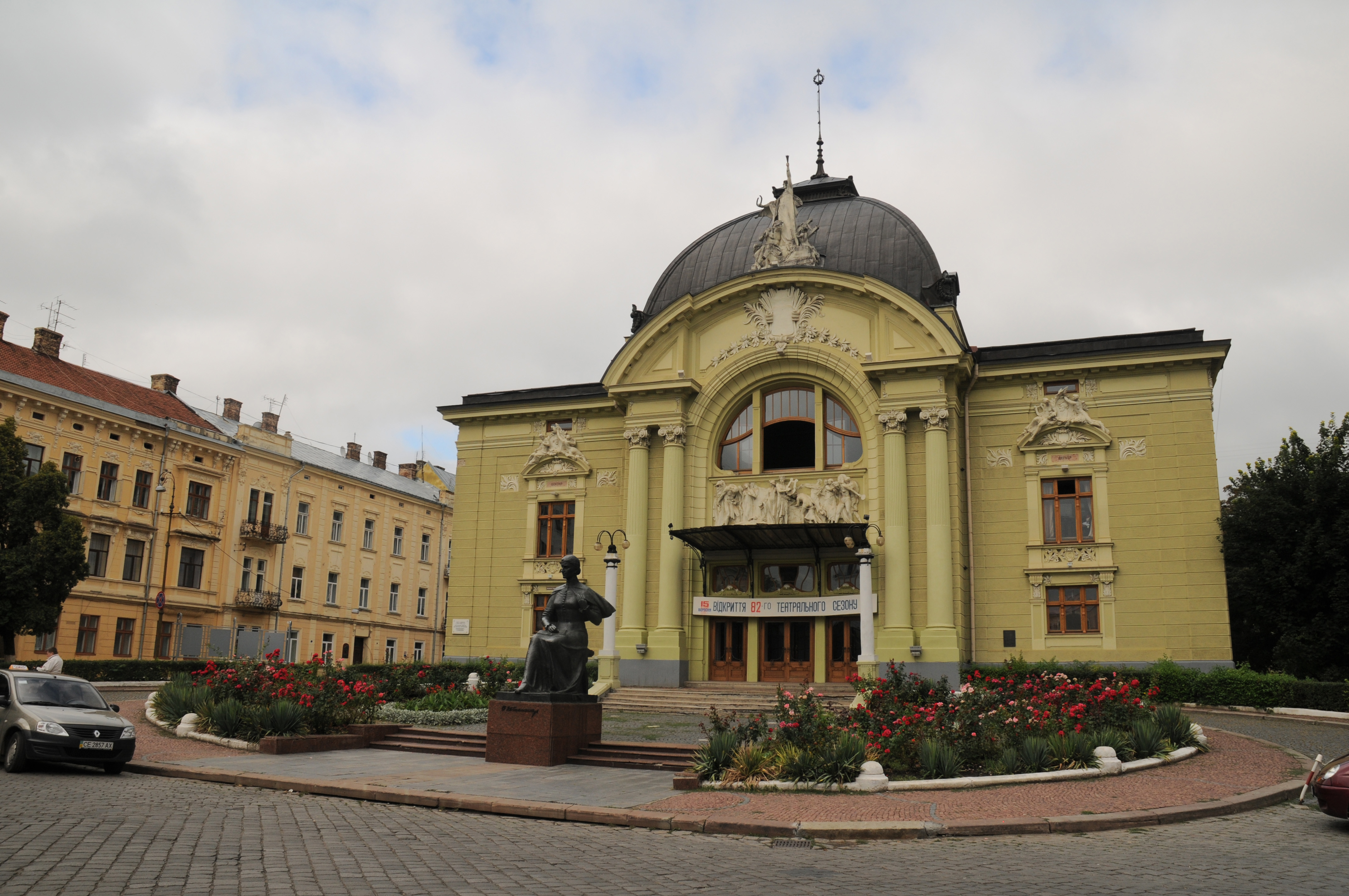
Chernivtsi Drama Theatre

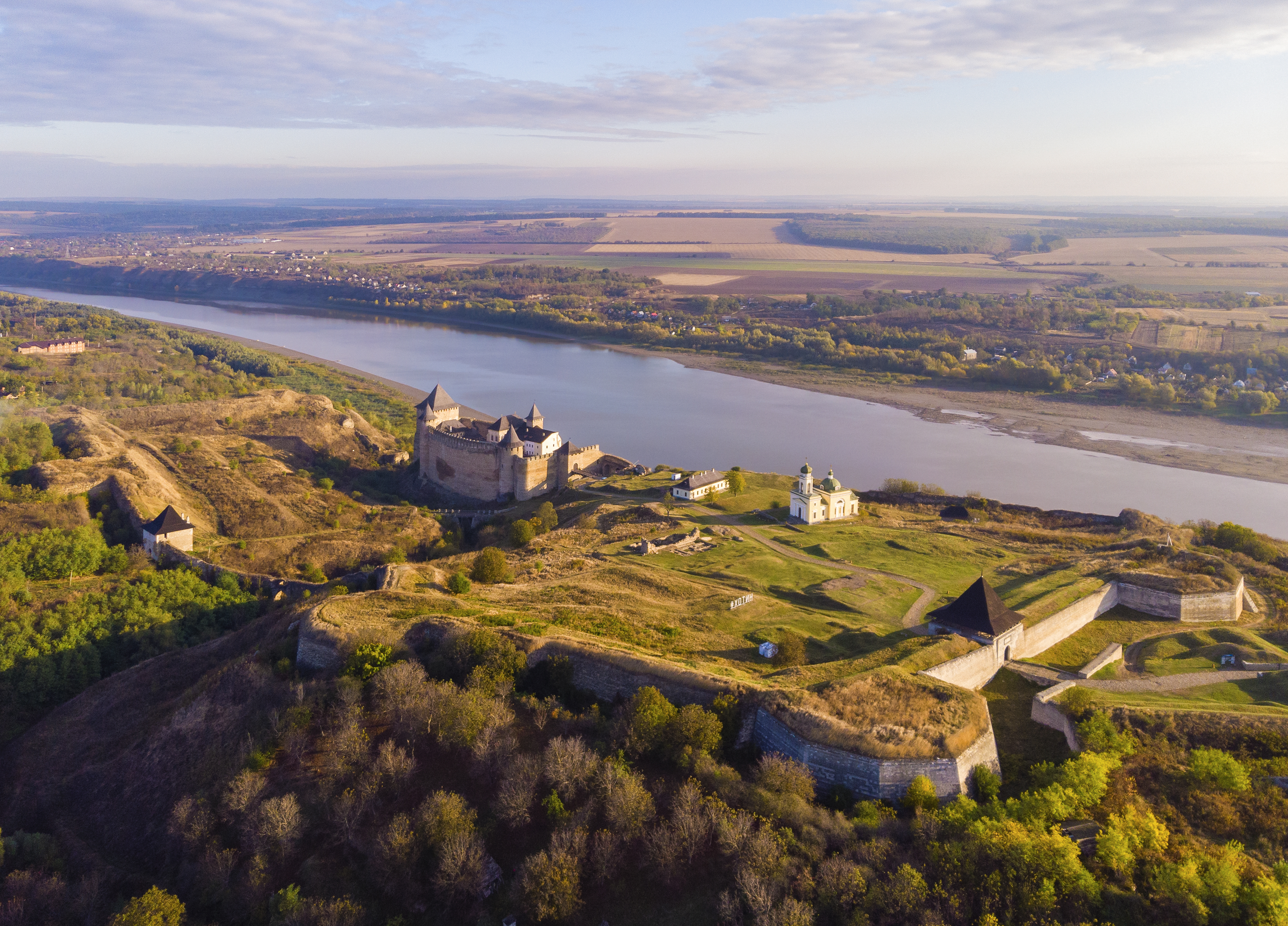
Khotyn Fortress complex

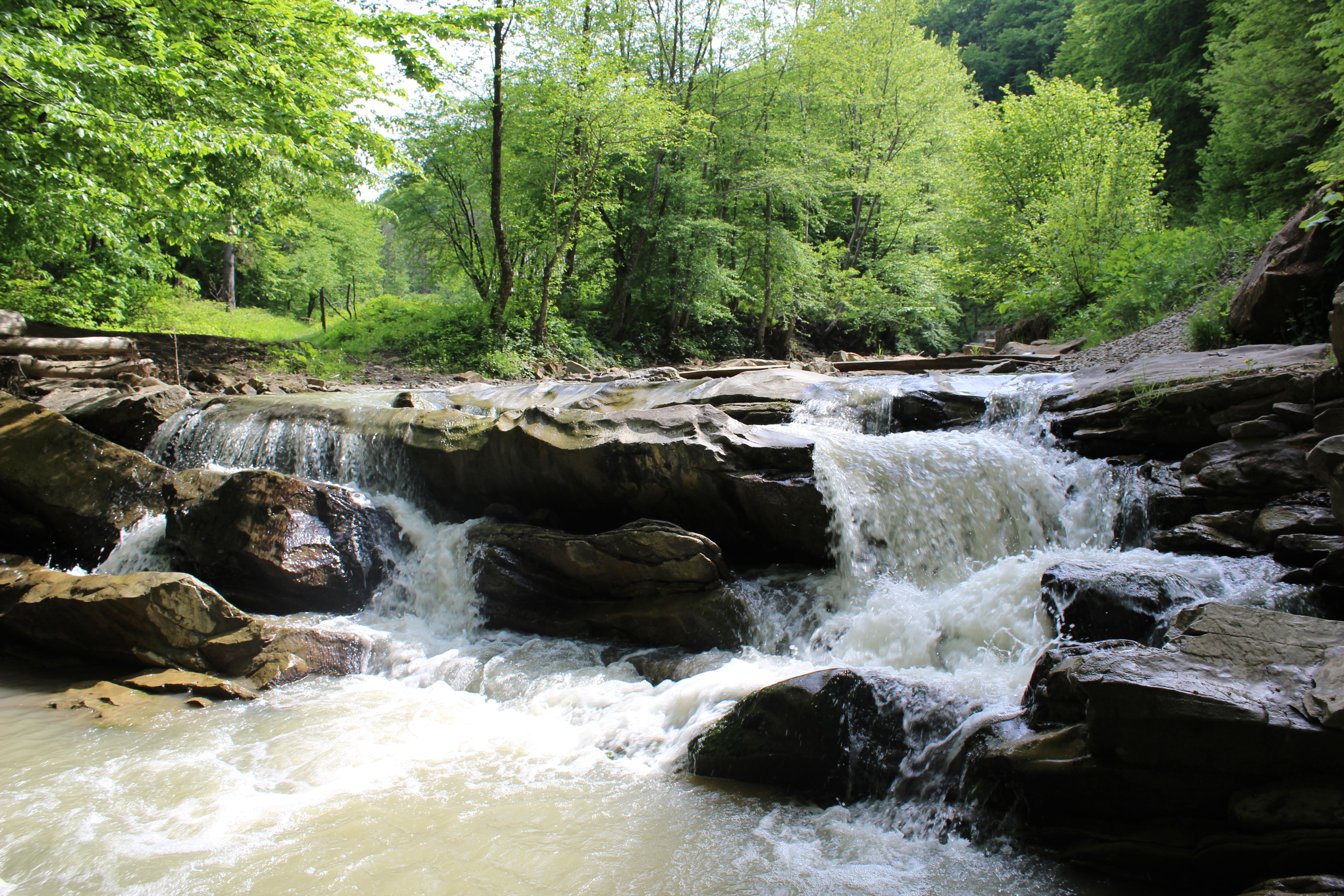
Luzhka Waterfall

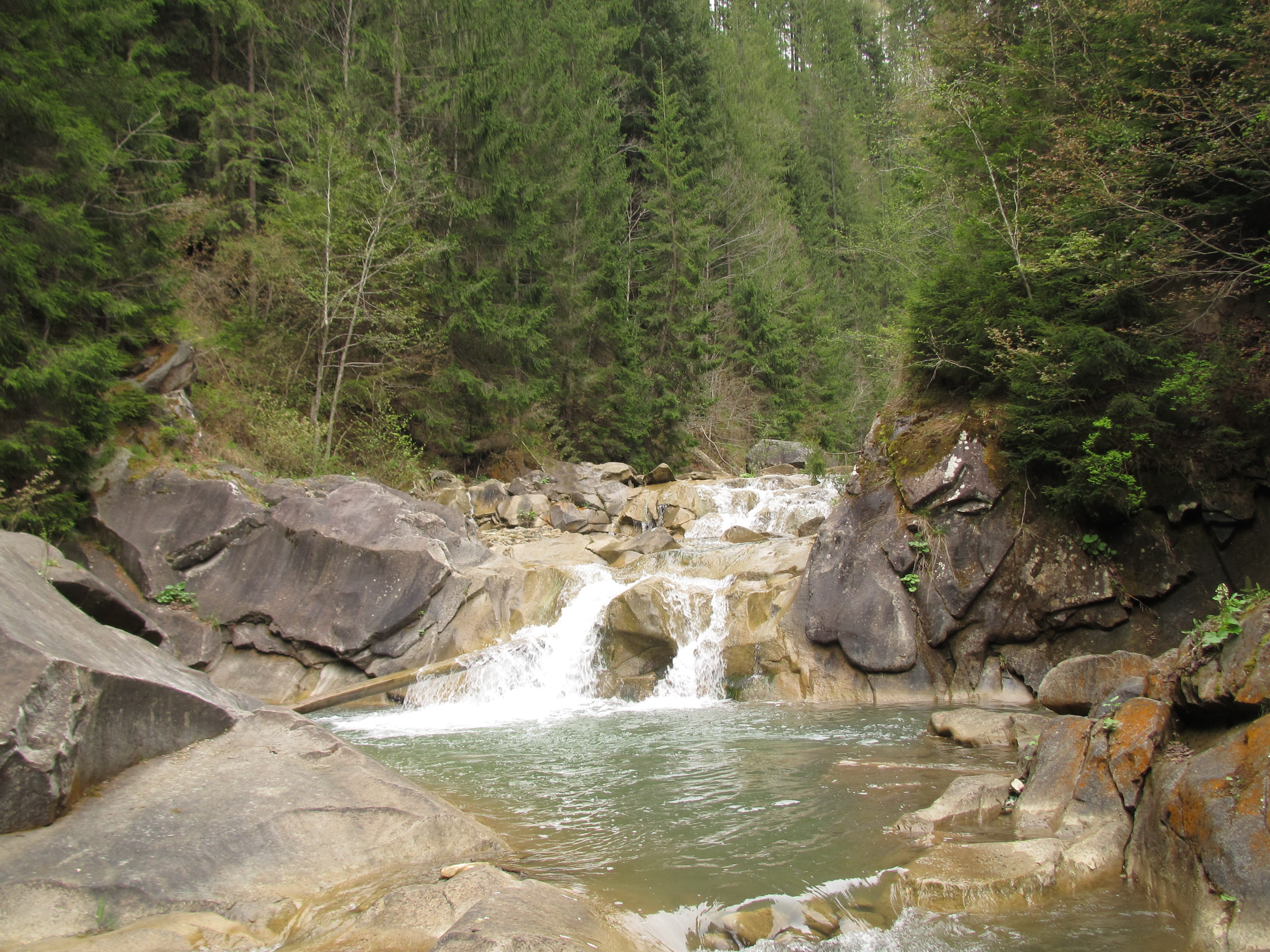
Biskiv Waterfall

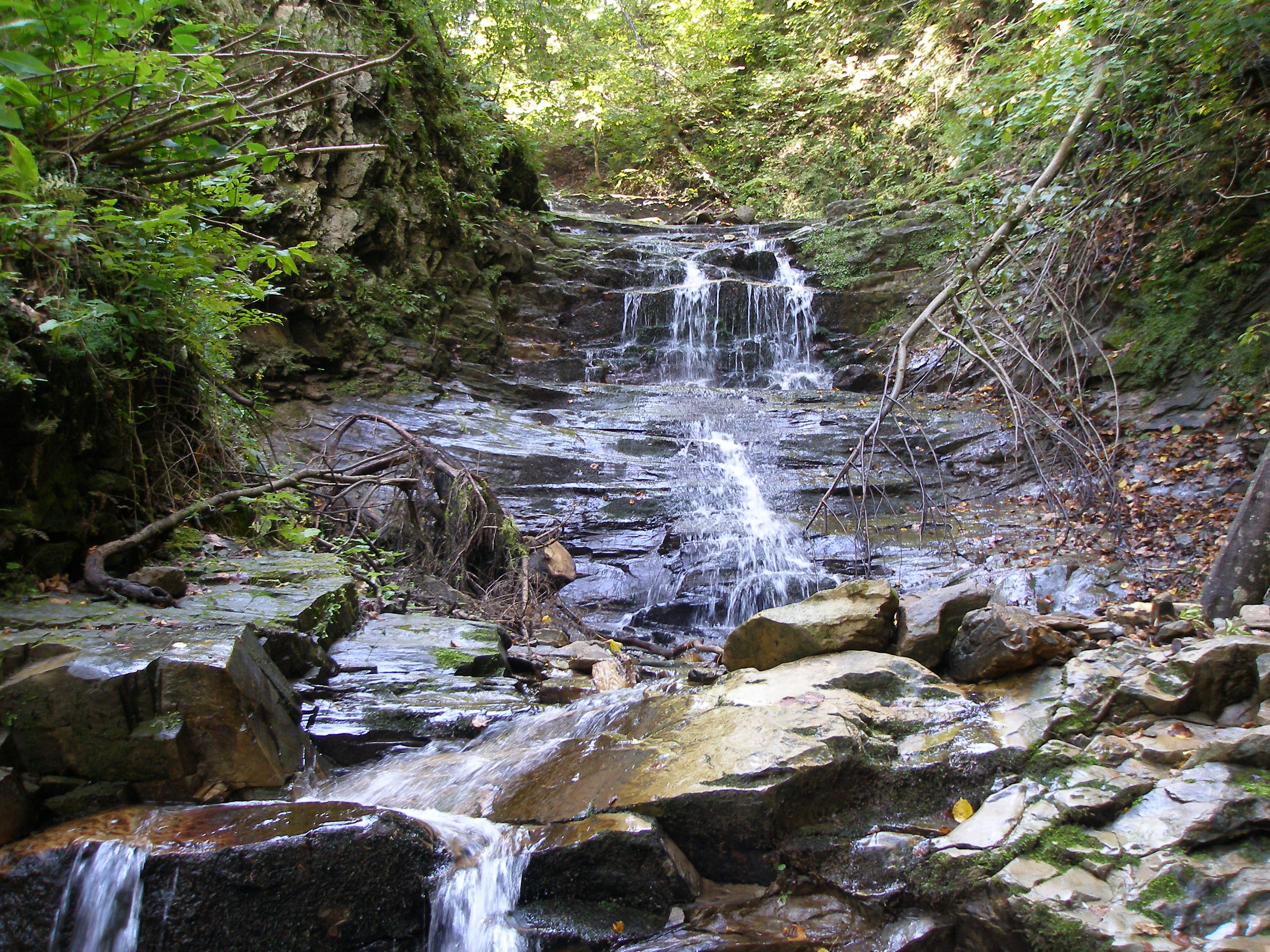
Chemernarskyi Nyzhnii Huk

== See also ==
- List of Canadian place names of Ukrainian origin
