= Wooden churches in Ukraine =

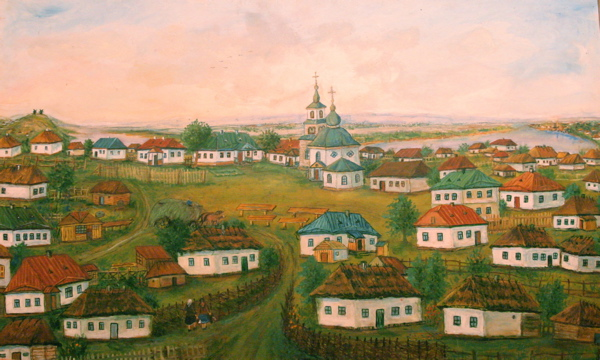
19th-century view of village of Trypillia and its wooden church, prior to the damming of the Dnipro river (Regional Archeological Museum).

Wooden church architecture in Ukraine dates from the beginning of Christianity in the area and comprises a set of unique styles and forms specific to many sub-regions of the country. As a form of vernacular culture, construction of the churches in specific styles is passed on to subsequent generations. The architectural styles vary from very simple to complicated, involving a highly skilled carpentry and exceptional artistry in wood-cutting.

Aside from tserkvas (Greek Catholic or Eastern Orthodox churches), there are quite a few kosciols (Latin Catholic churches) that are preserved in Western Ukraine. Some of these churches remain in active use.

== General overview ==
Nearly 1,900 wooden churches have been identified in Ukraine as of the end of 2010. When Ukrainians emigrated to the New World in the late 19th century, many used these stylistic forms but adapted their construction to the new materials and new environmental conditions (see for example the Holy Trinity Cathedral in Chicago, Illinois). According to the Director of the Lviv National Art Gallery, Borys Voznytsky, the current situation in the preservation of the unique churches in Ukraine is extremely difficult. Fewer churches burnt down in Western Ukraine during the Soviet era than have burnt down in the post-Soviet period.

== Wooden churches of Central and Eastern Ukraine ==
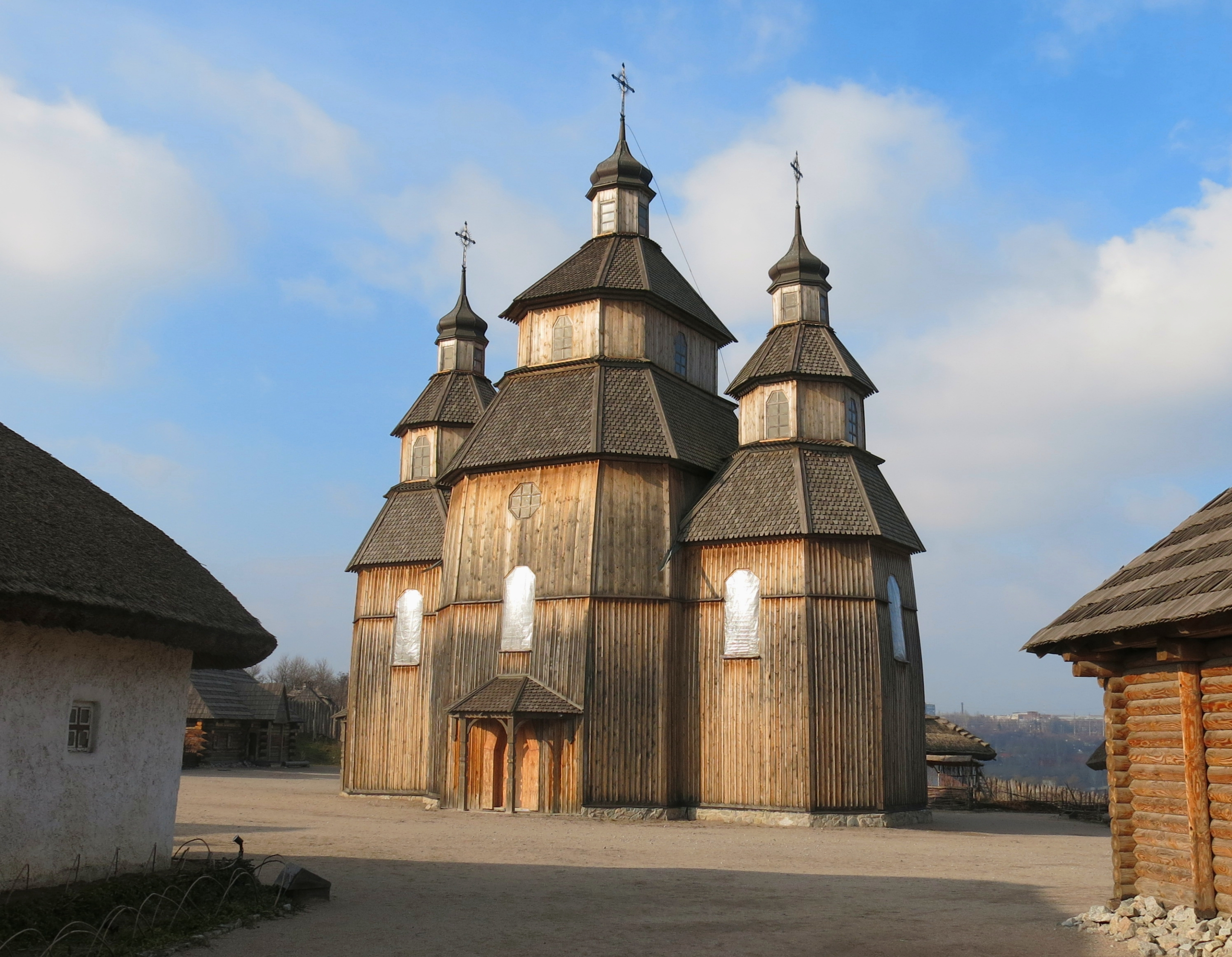
Pokrova Church on Khortytsia

The wooden church architecture of Central and Eastern Ukraine finds its roots in the first millennium of Christianity in Ukraine from the time of Vladimir the Great (Grand Prince of Kiev from 980 to 1015). While masonry churches prevailed in urban areas, wooden church architecture continued primarily in Ukrainian villages of central and eastern Ukraine. Unlike western Ukraine, there is no clear separation of style based on region. Central Ukrainian churches are similar to the multi-chamber masonry churches of Kievan Rus' but are, instead, constructed in wood. Both framed construction and nail-less styles are also represented.

== Wooden churches of Western Ukraine ==
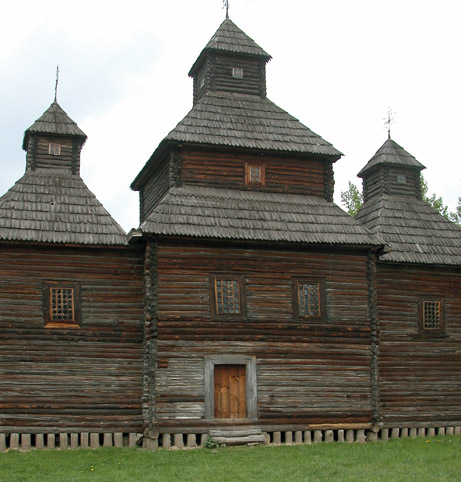
Wooden church from Kysorychi, Rivne region at the Pyrohiv Museum, central Ukraine

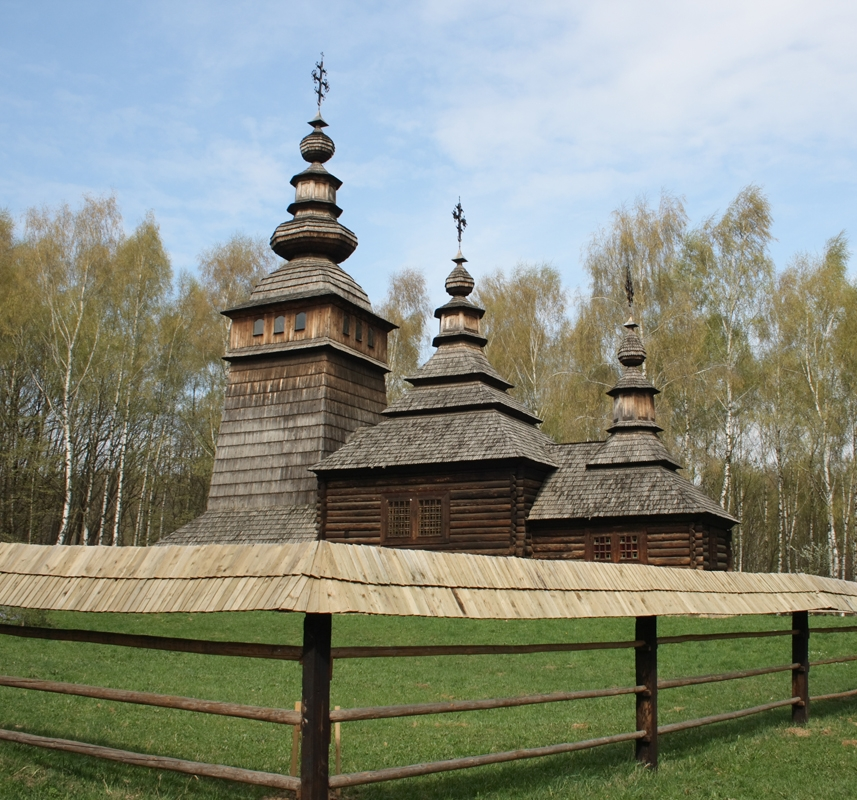
Lemko church from Kotań transported to Shevchenkivskyi Hai open-air museum in Lviv

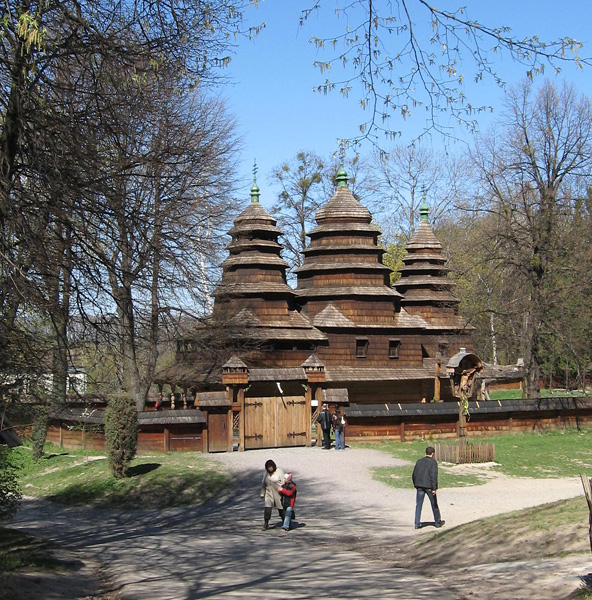
Kryvka Church in Lviv's Shevchenkivskyi Hai open-air museum, an example of Boyko wooden architecture

Relatively isolated peasant cultures in western and Transcarpathian Ukraine were able to maintain construction in wooden styles into the early 20th century. Many ethnographic regions maintained specific styles of architecture aligned to their cultural, environmental and historical differences.

Common to all the regions, in some way, are two techniques of roofing: opasannia, the structure supporting the roof formed from projecting logs from top corners of log walls and pidashshia, a style using opasannia supports, but extending the roofing far enough to form a continuous overhang of the roof around the church perimeter.

The Lviv Oblast alone has 999 churches that are registered monuments of architecture - 398 of which are of national importance - however only 16 of those thousand churches have fire-alarm systems. During the post-Soviet era, the Lviv Oblast has already lost some 80 churches to fires. In 2009 the government of the region granted approximately ₴2 million to finance restoration projects of the churches.

Eight wooden churches in Western Ukraine are a part of the World Heritage Site of Wooden Tserkvas of the Carpathian Region in Poland and Ukraine.

Bukovina

The traditional Bukovinian church features a tall gabled roof, but often terminates in splayed roof over the polygonal sanctuary. The roofwork features opasannia and was covered in wooden shingles. The structure was usually built from logs but was often covered in clay and whitewashed, similar to Bukovinian-style homes.

Lemko

Lemko churches most often used a three-section design with very tall gabled roofs and a tower over each section, with the tower over the entrance being the tallest. Topping each tower is a spire, resembling a Gothic spire, albeit constructed in Ukrainian style.

Hutsul

Hutsul churches most often were 5-section cruciform structures, using spruce logs to form walls with opasannia type arcades. The central dome is formed in an octahedral shape with a splayed roof, instead of an onion dome. Also unique to Hutsul churches is the use of tin or metalwork in the upper parts of the church, which are also used in home architecture of the region.

Boyko

Boyko churches are defined by their three section design, with the central nave being the largest. Intricate, multi-tiered and shingled roofwork is the most distinguishing factor in Boyko church design. The structures used the most traditional techniques, having both frameless walls and rafterless roofs as well as using opasannia and piddashshia.

Ternopil

Ternopil construction styles are considered a mix of Carpathian and Kyiv styles. Two styles prevail: Ternopil Nave Style and Ternopil Cruciform Style. The nave style used a long rectangular shape with gabled roofing on opposite ends with a small decorative onion dome, often not visible from inside the church. The cruciform style uses an equidistant cruciform pattern with a structural central onion dome, and gabled roofing over each cruciform section. While constructed in wood in villages, this style often used masonry in urban areas.

== Notable wooden churches in Ukraine ==
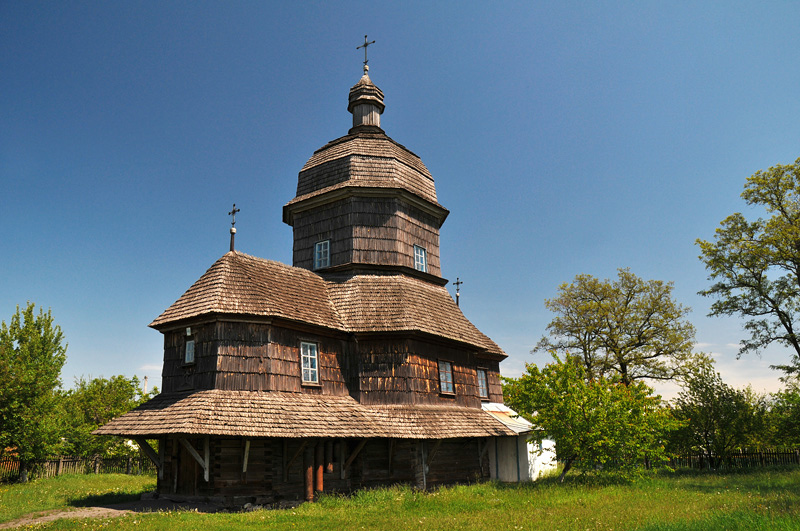
Trinity Church in Drabivtsi

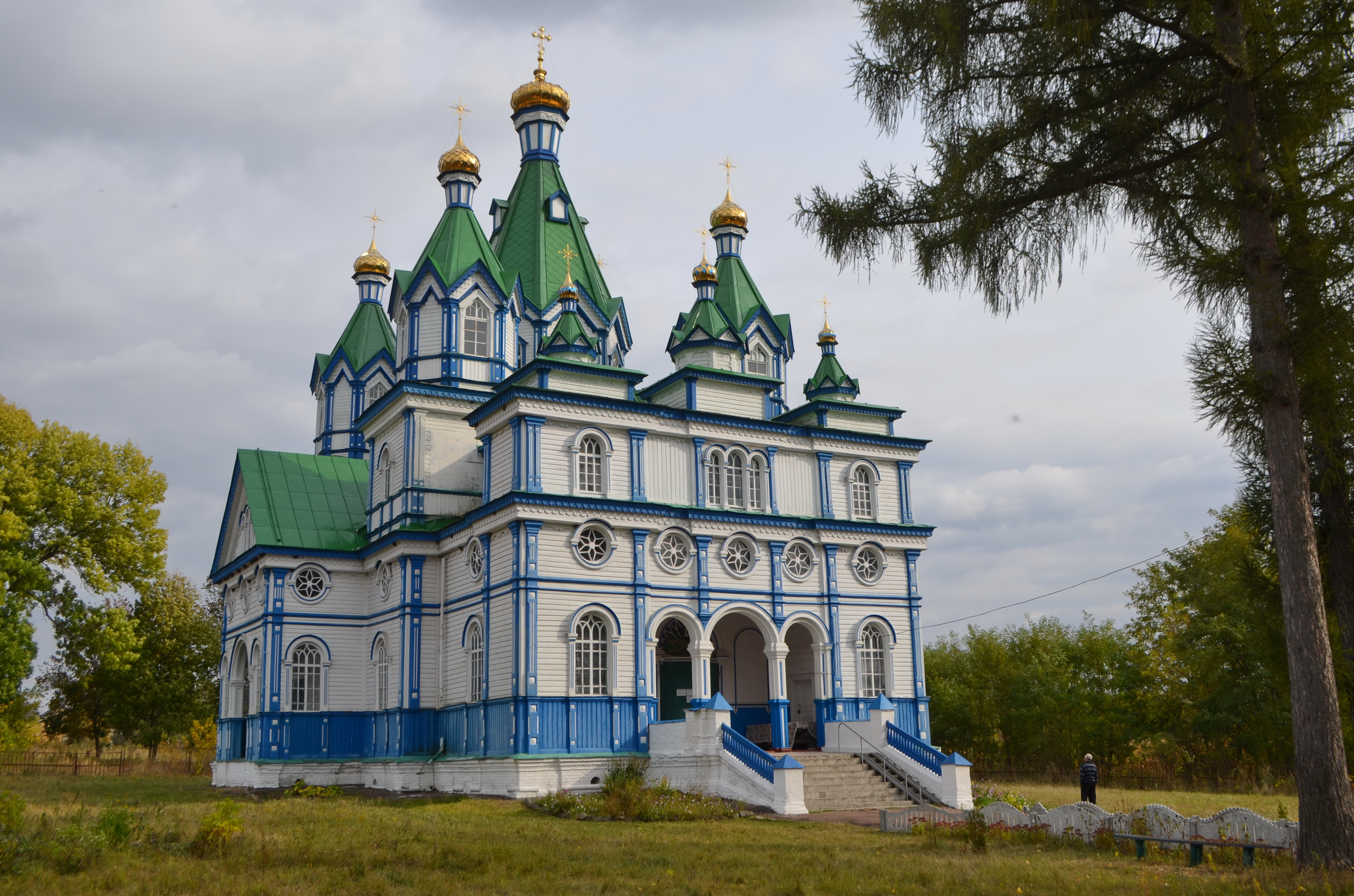
Assumption Church in Stara Talalaivka

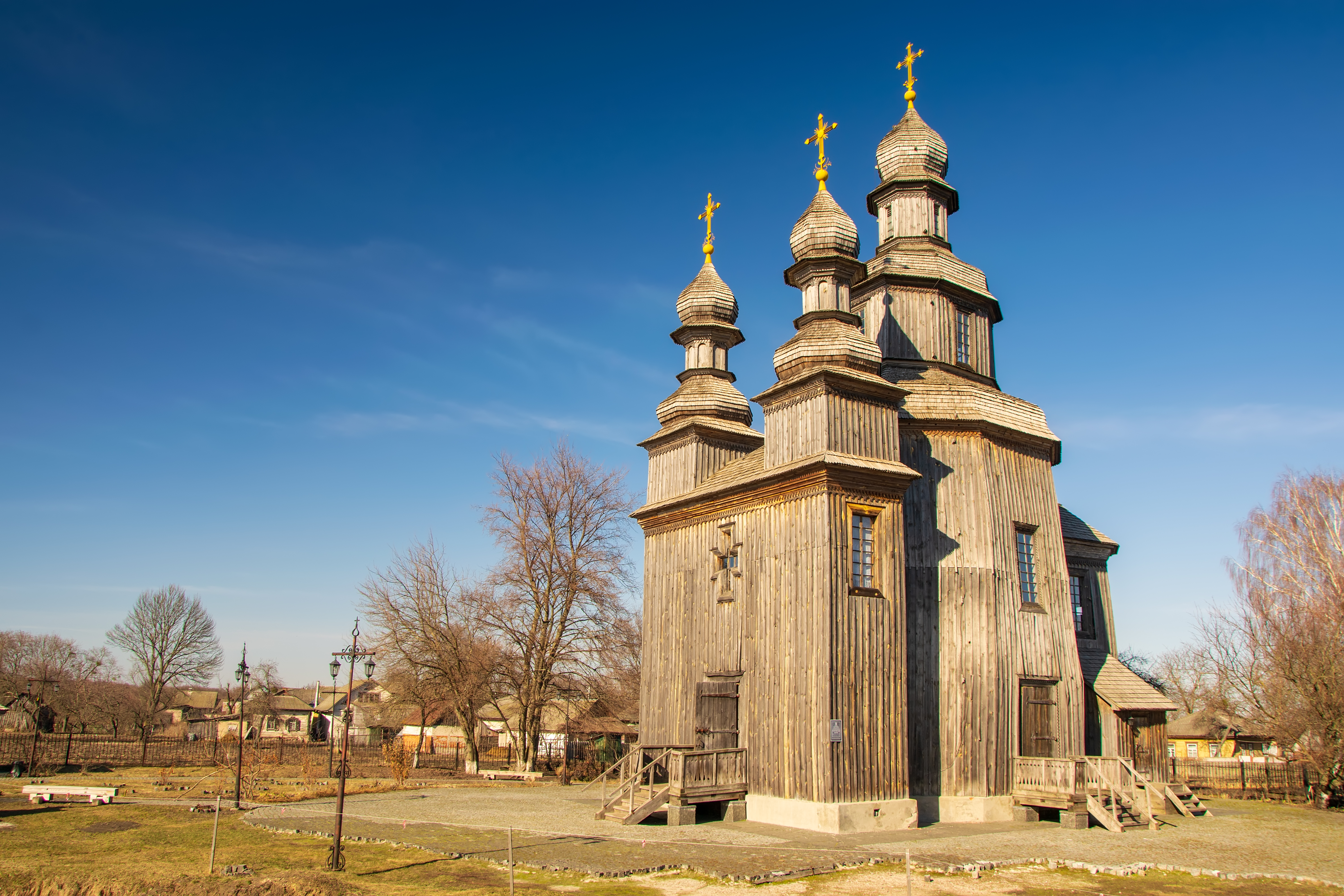
Sedniv Saint George's Church

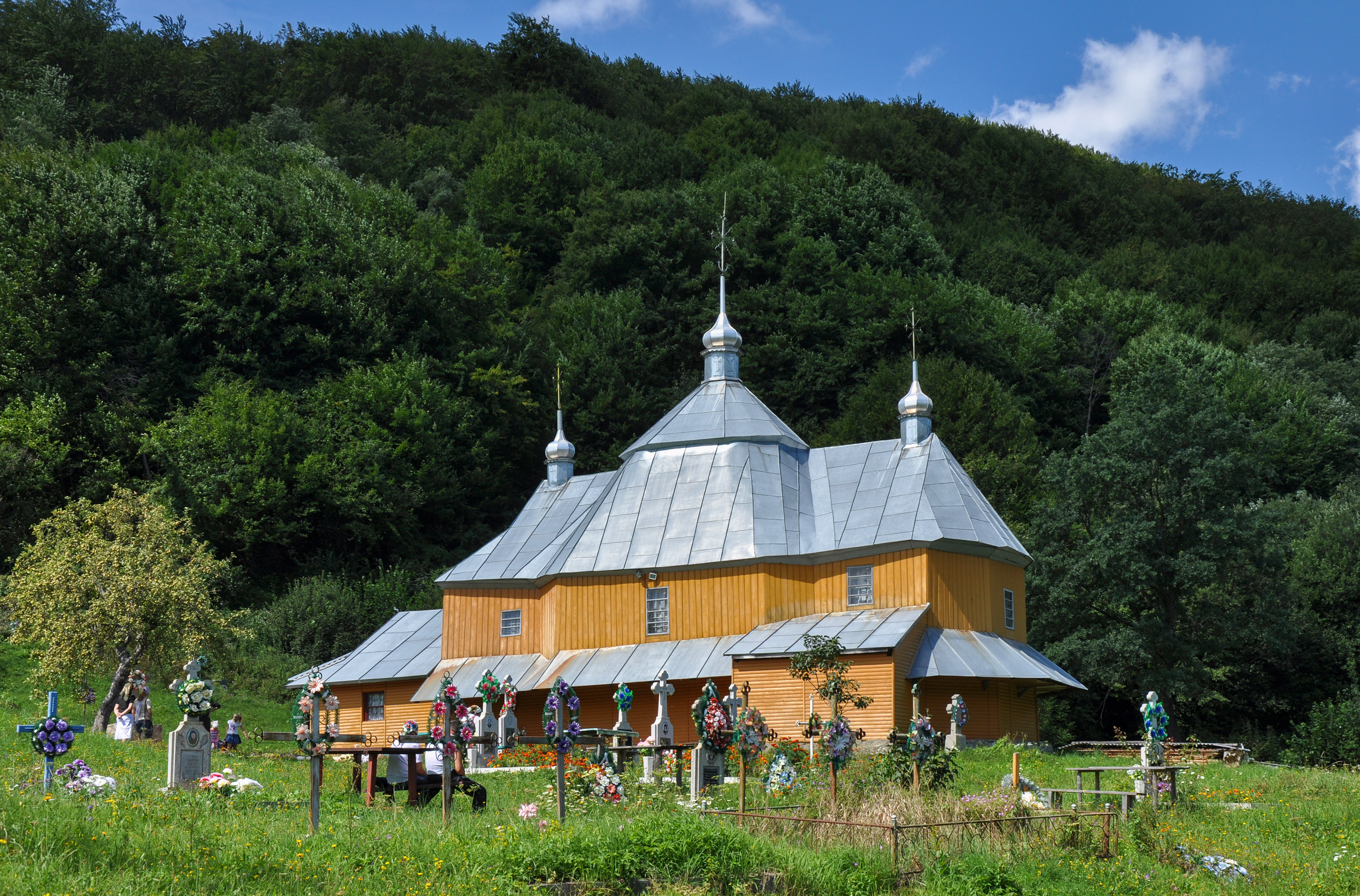
Vyzhenka Church of St John of Suceava

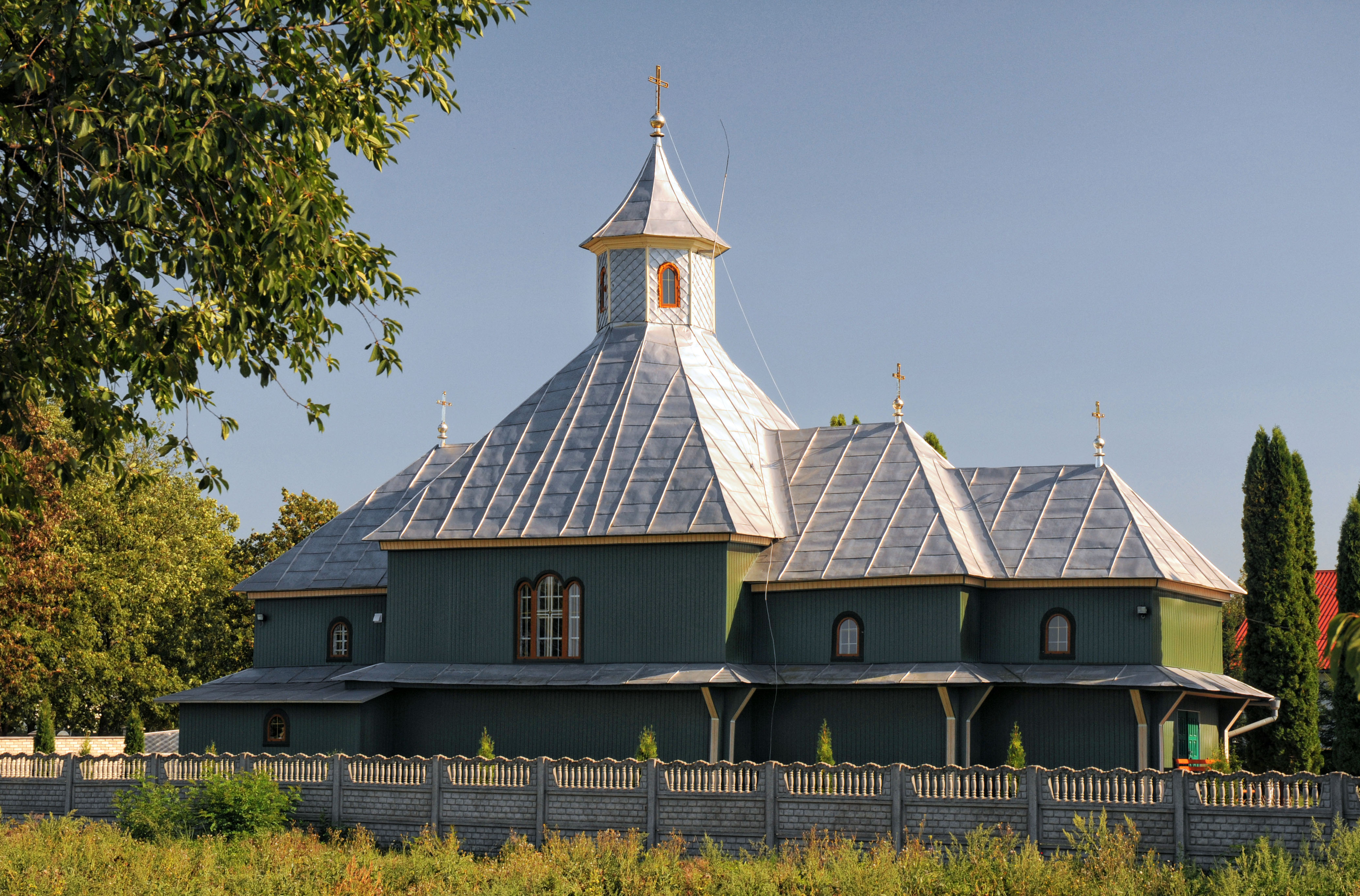
Mamaivtsi Saint John's Church

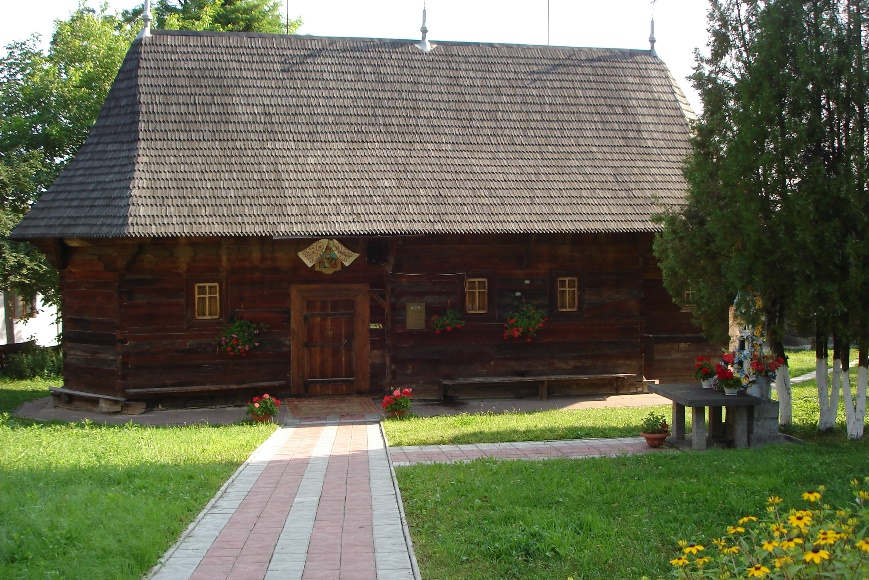
Saint Nicholas wooden church in Chernivtsi

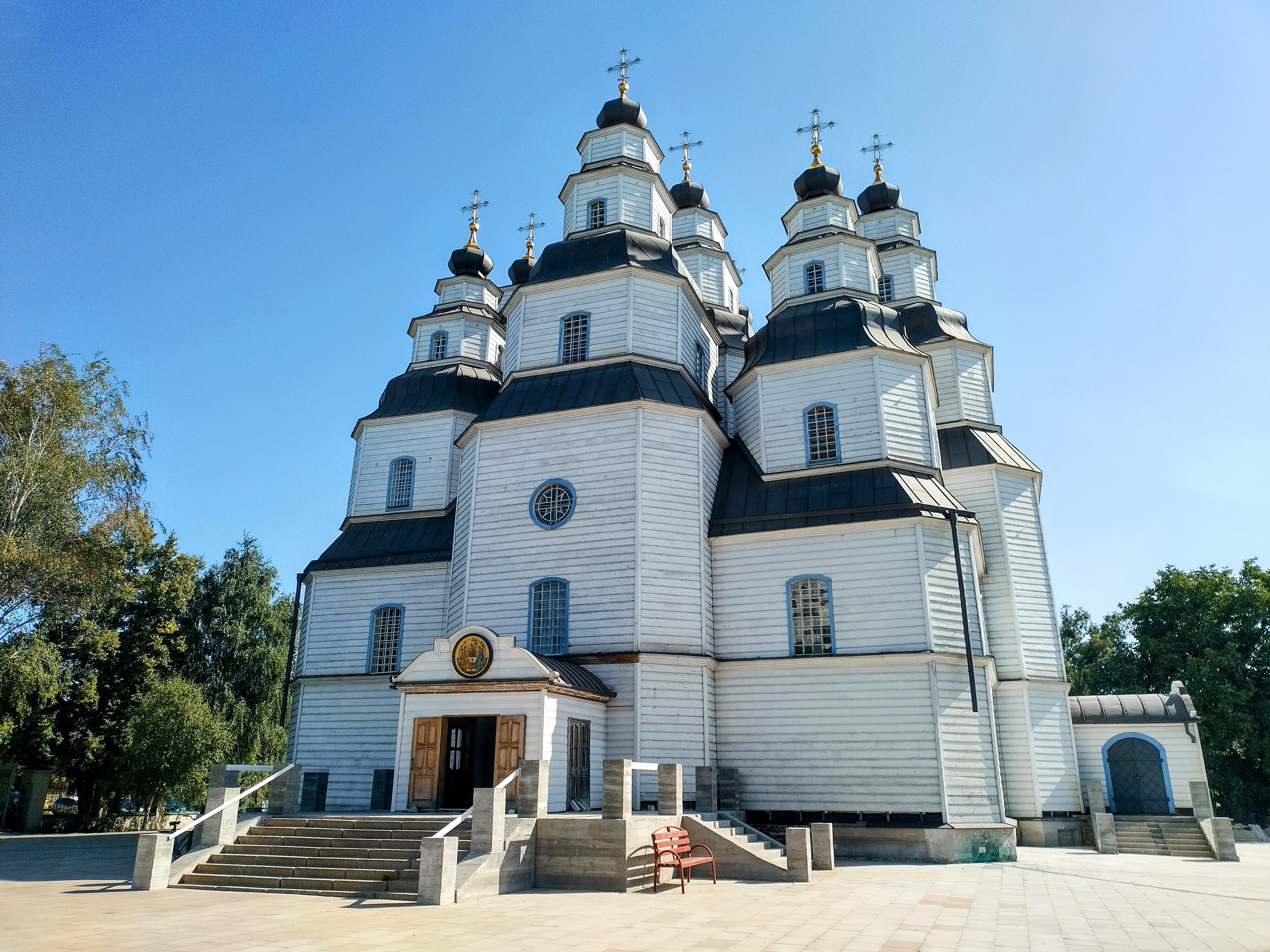
Holy Trinity Cathedral in Samar

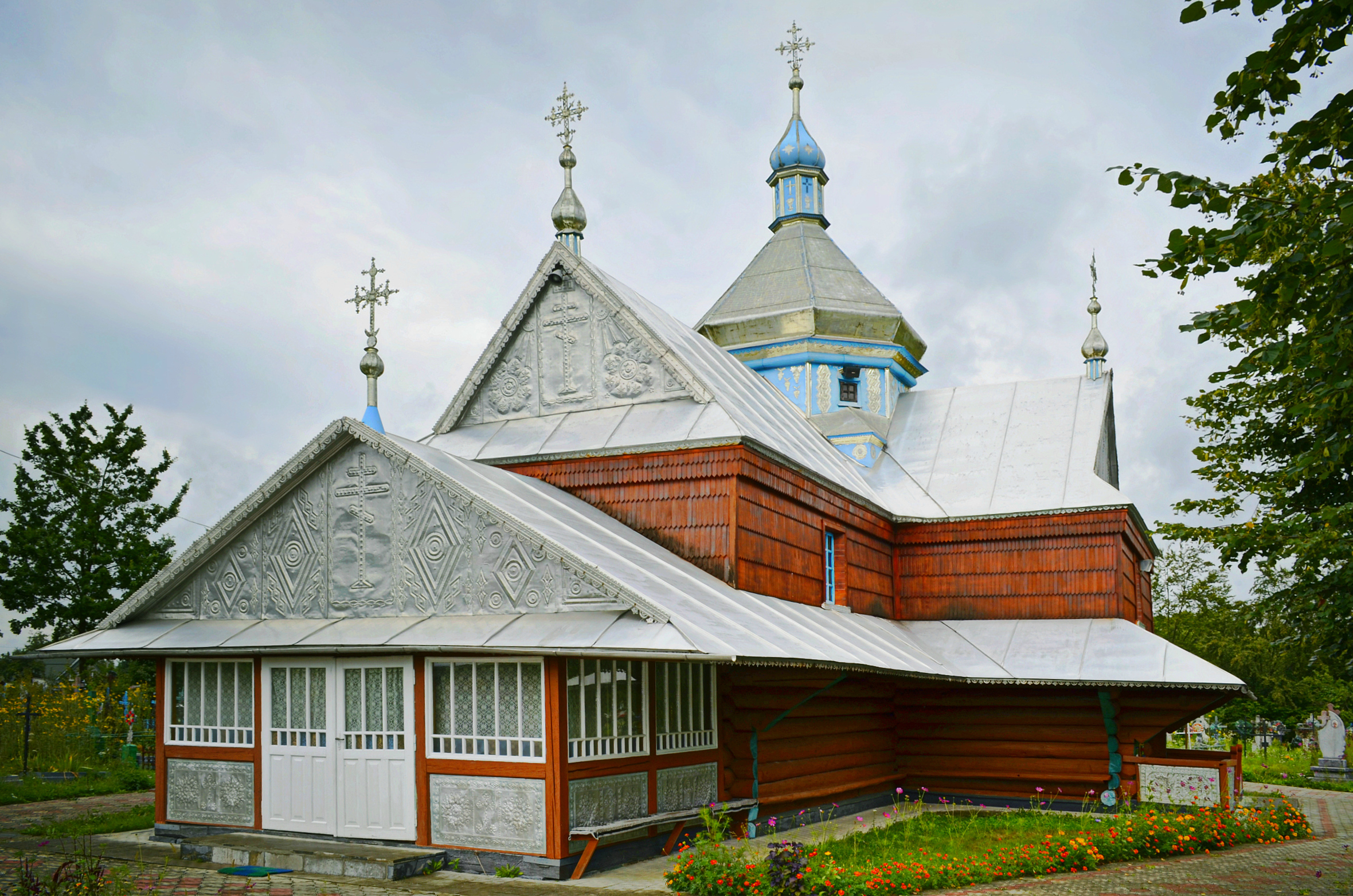
Church in Pistyn

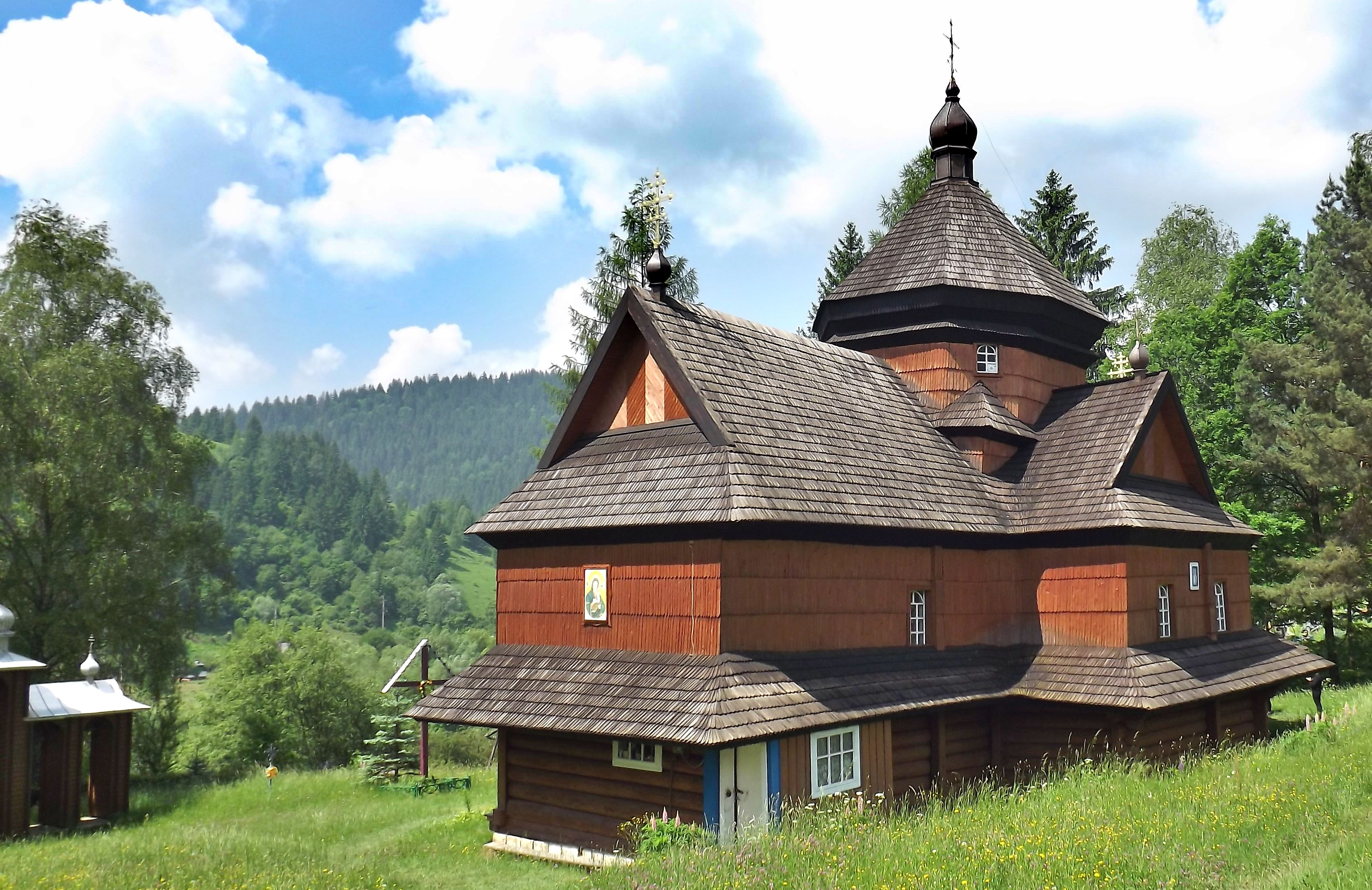
Church in Kryvorivnia

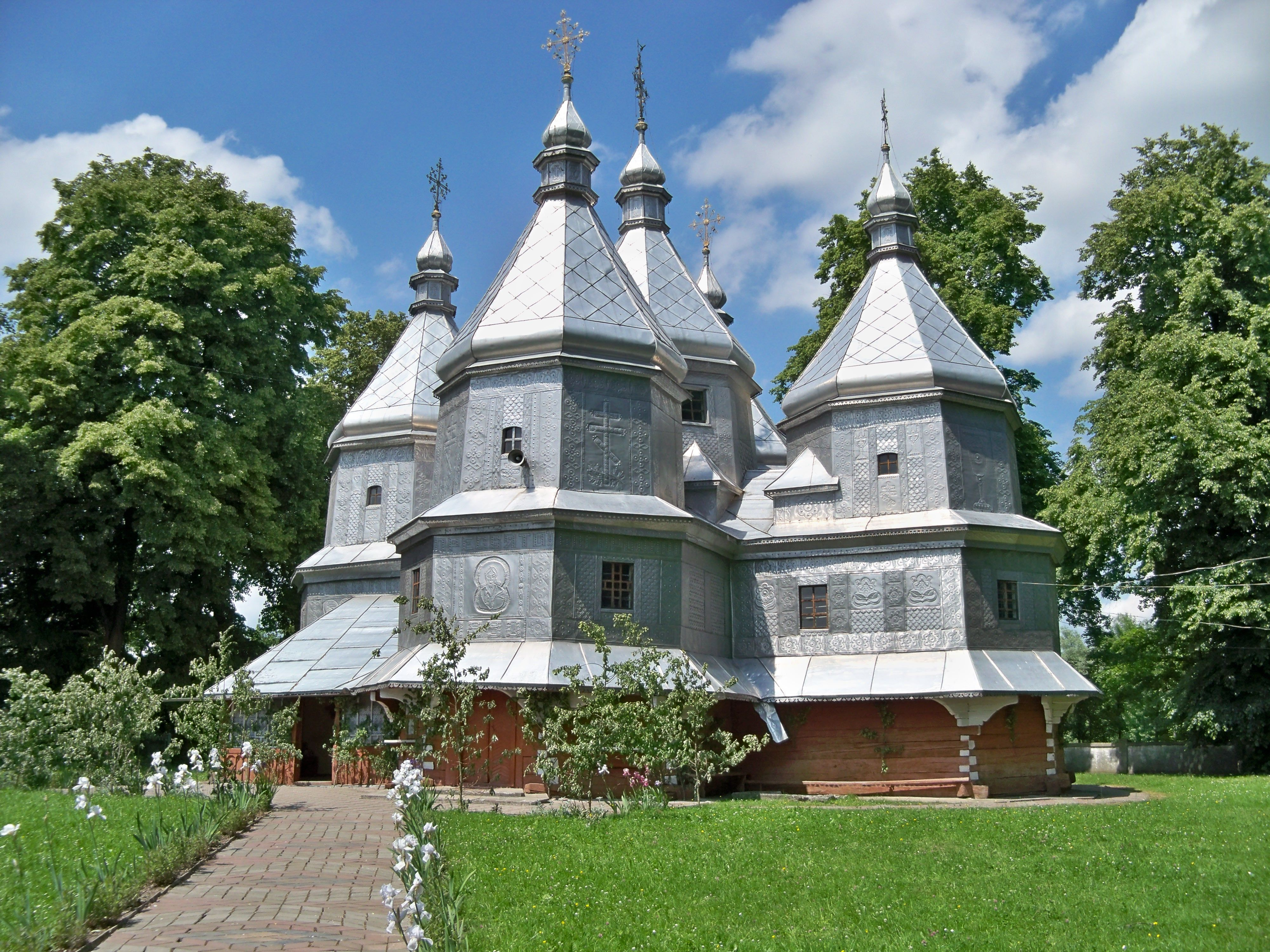
Church of Nativity of the Theotokos, Nyzhnii Verbizh

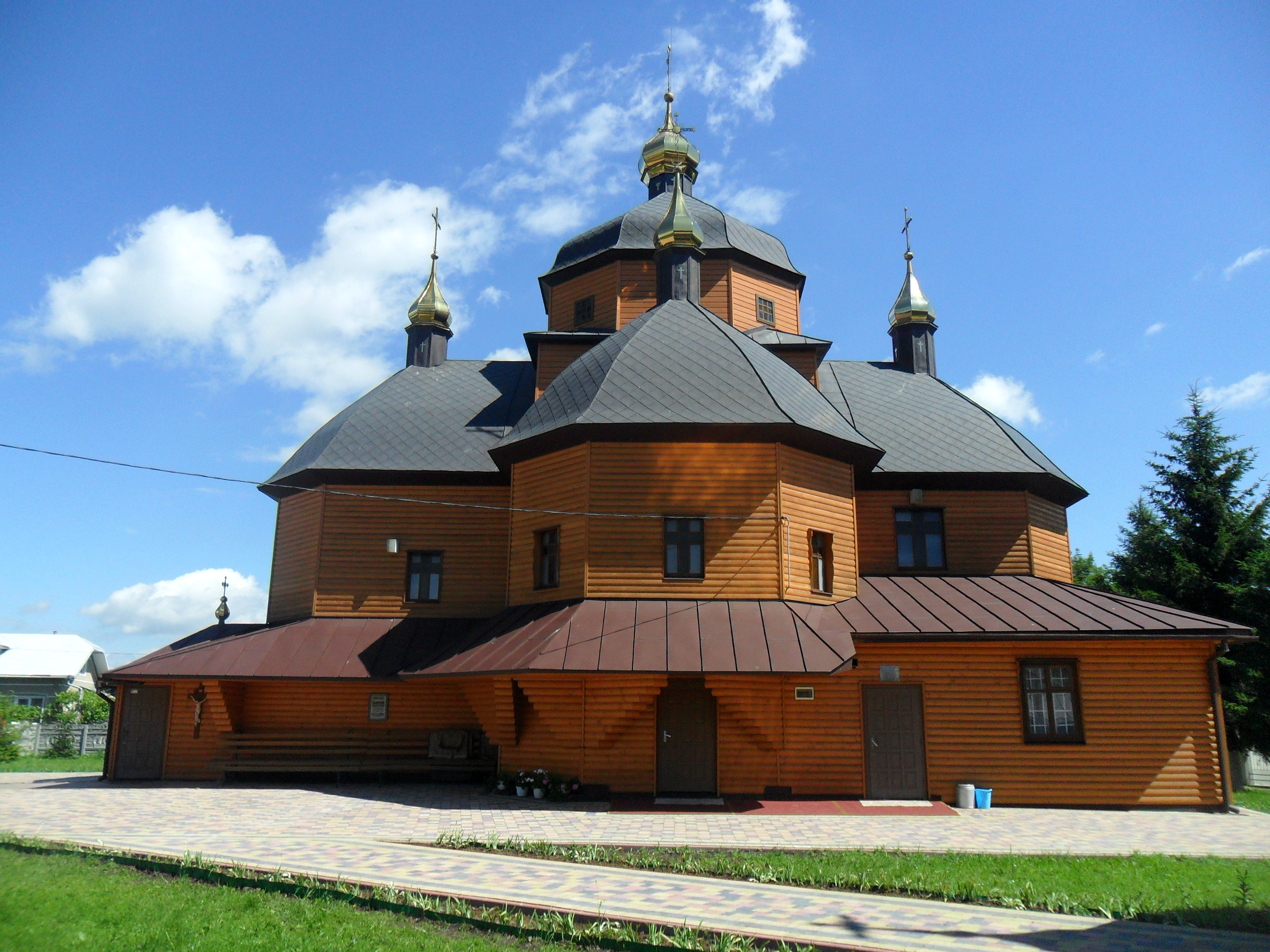
Tysmenytsia wooden church

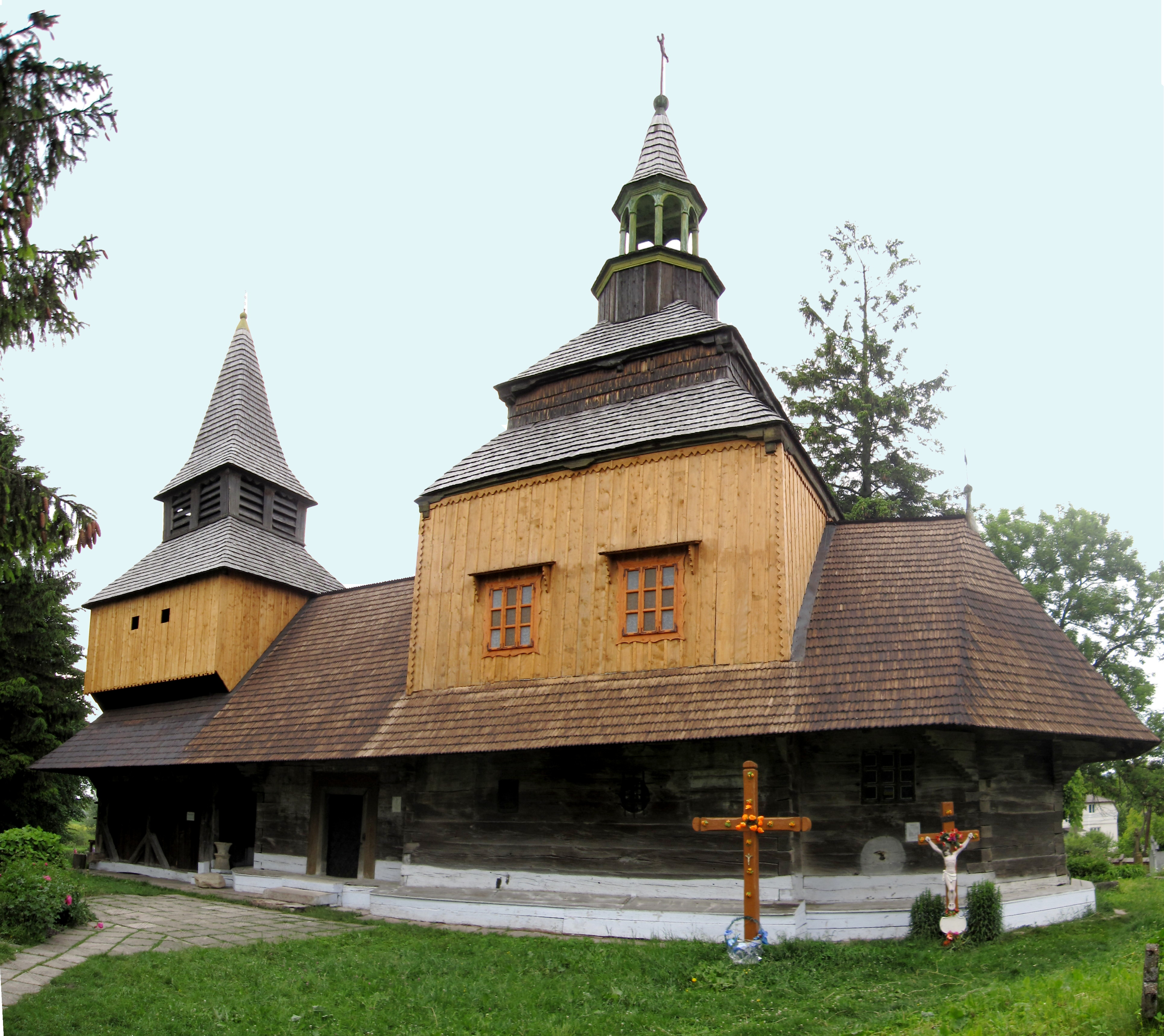
Holy Spirit Church, Rohatyn

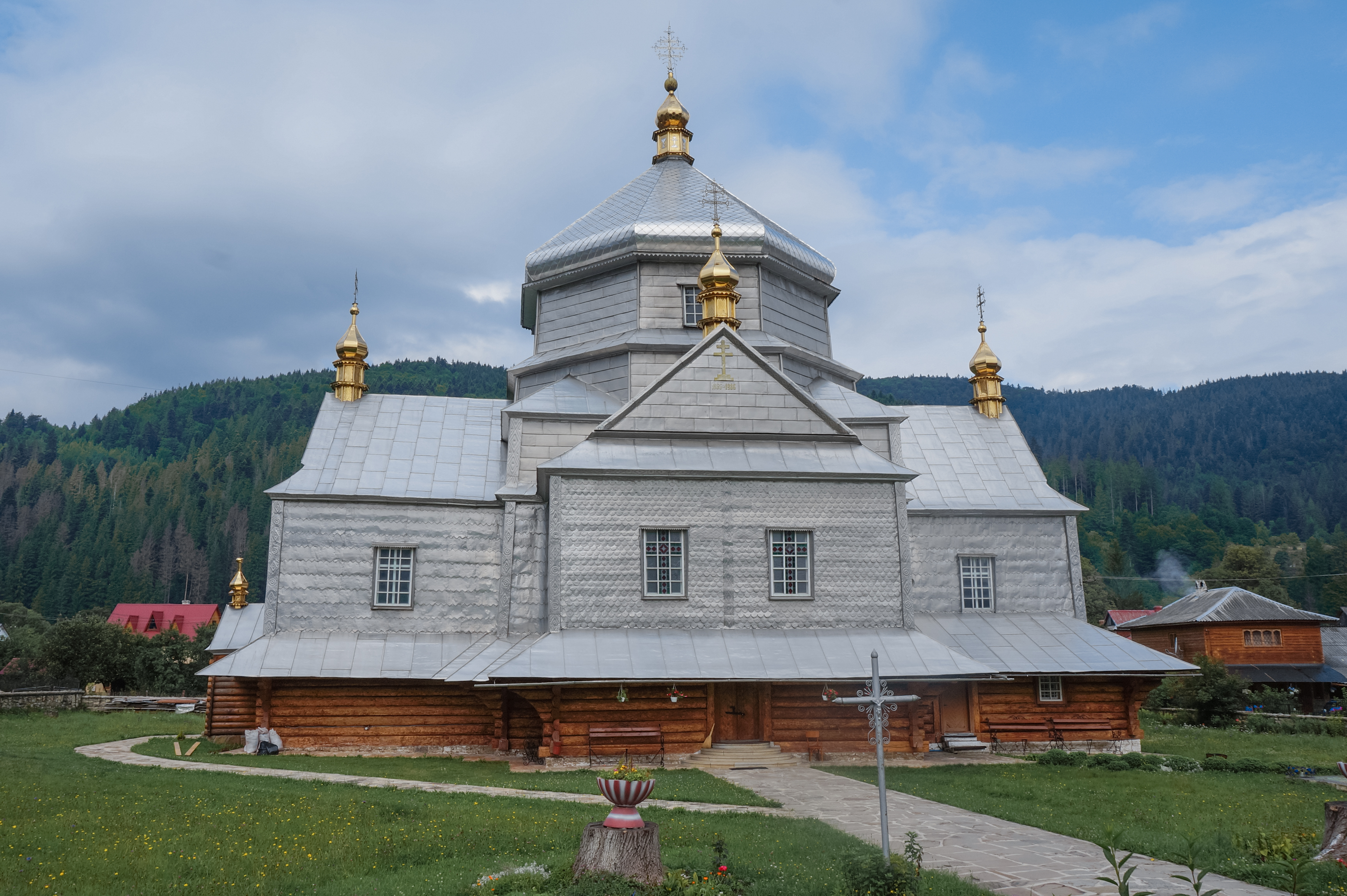
Trinity Church in Mykulychyn

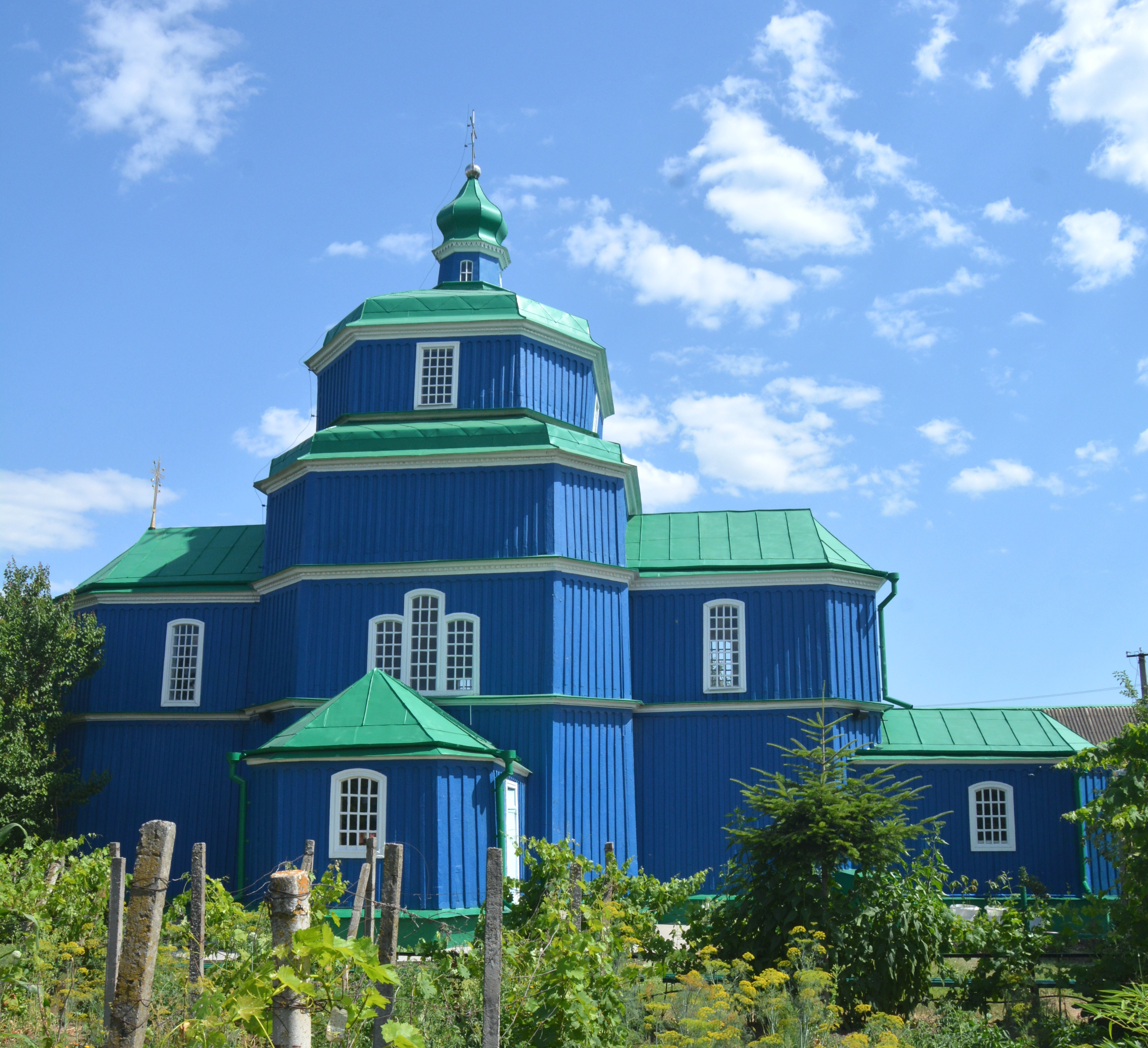
Beryslav church

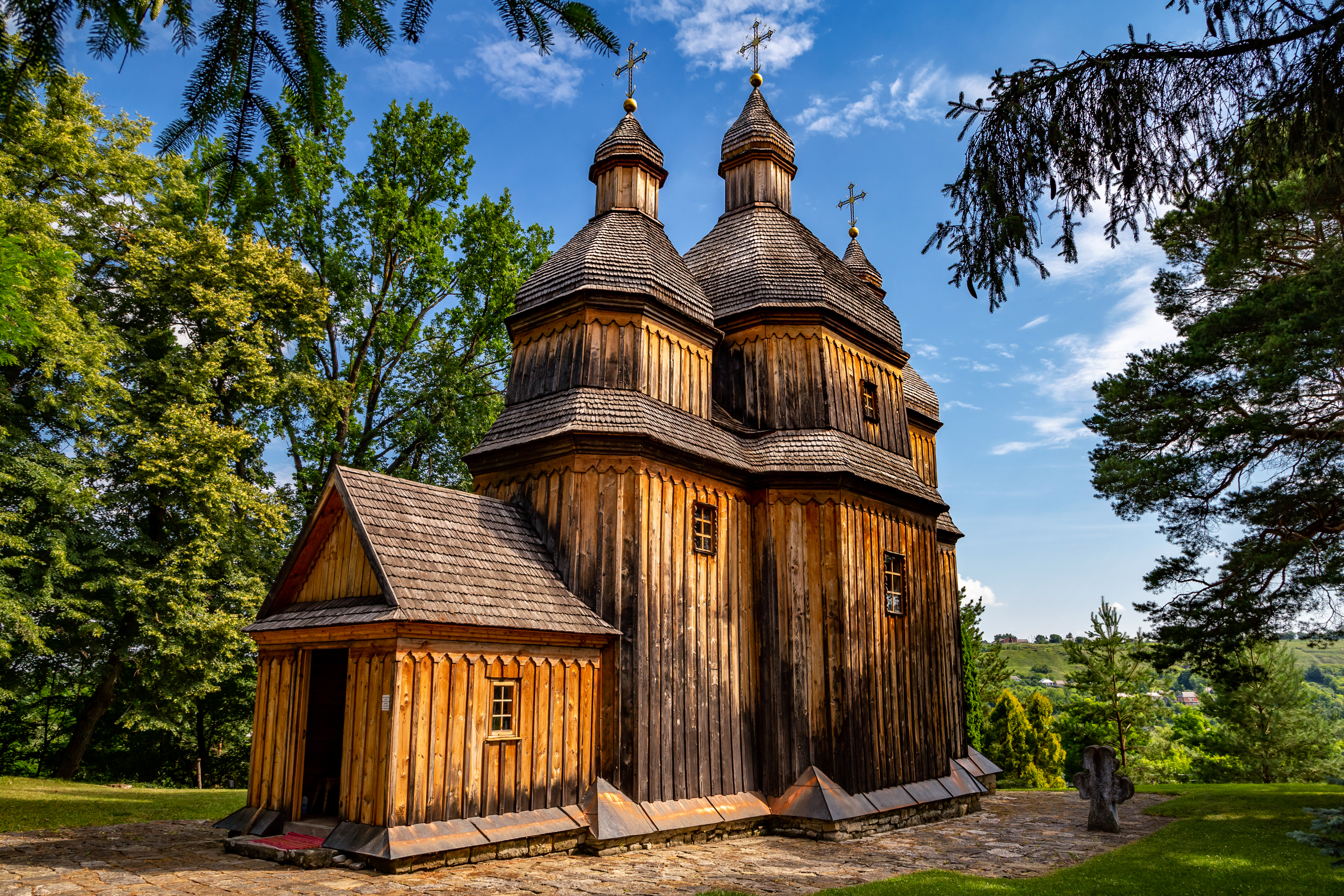
Saint Michael's Church in Zinkiv

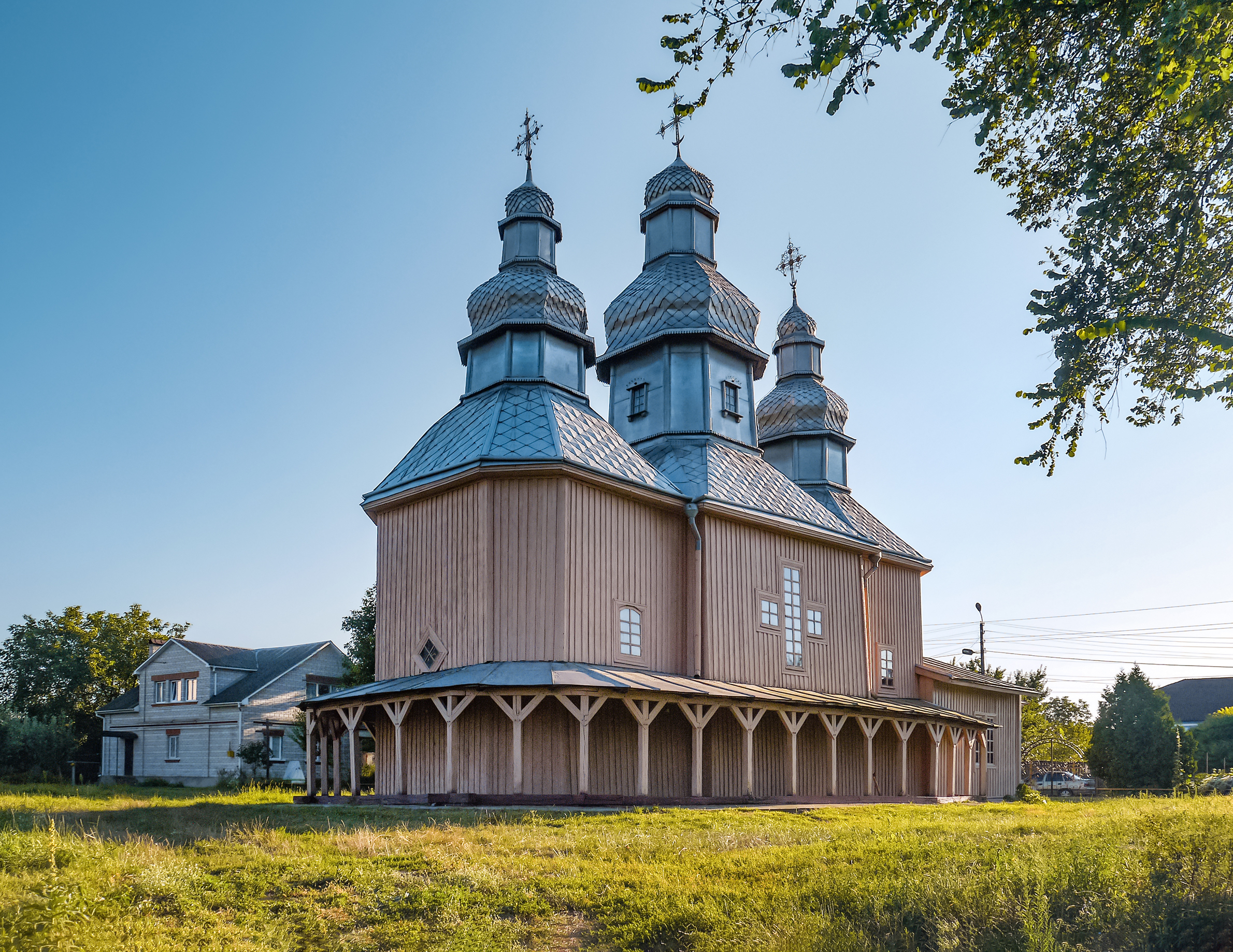
Intercession Church in Fastiv

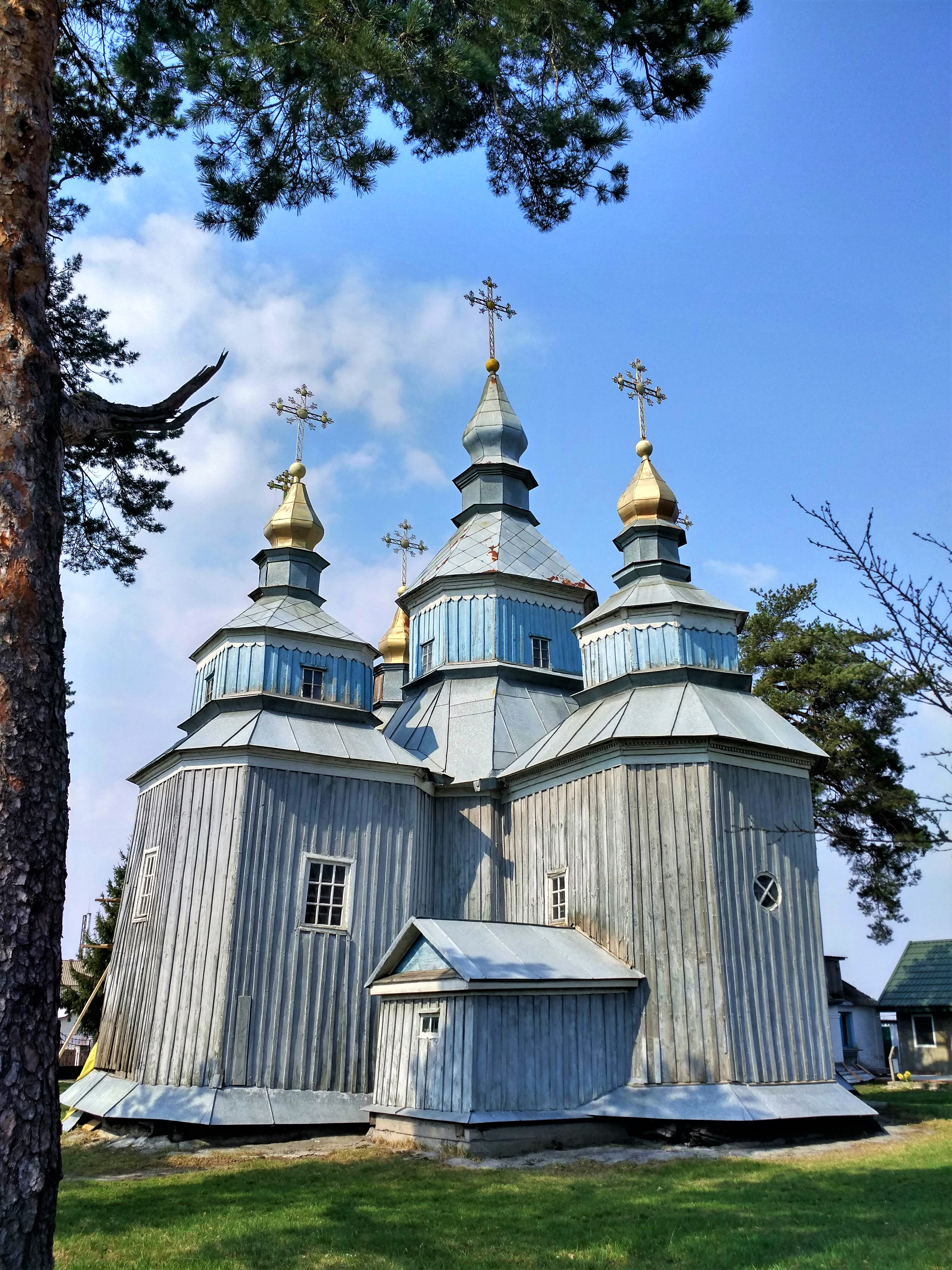
Saint Nicholas church in Syniava

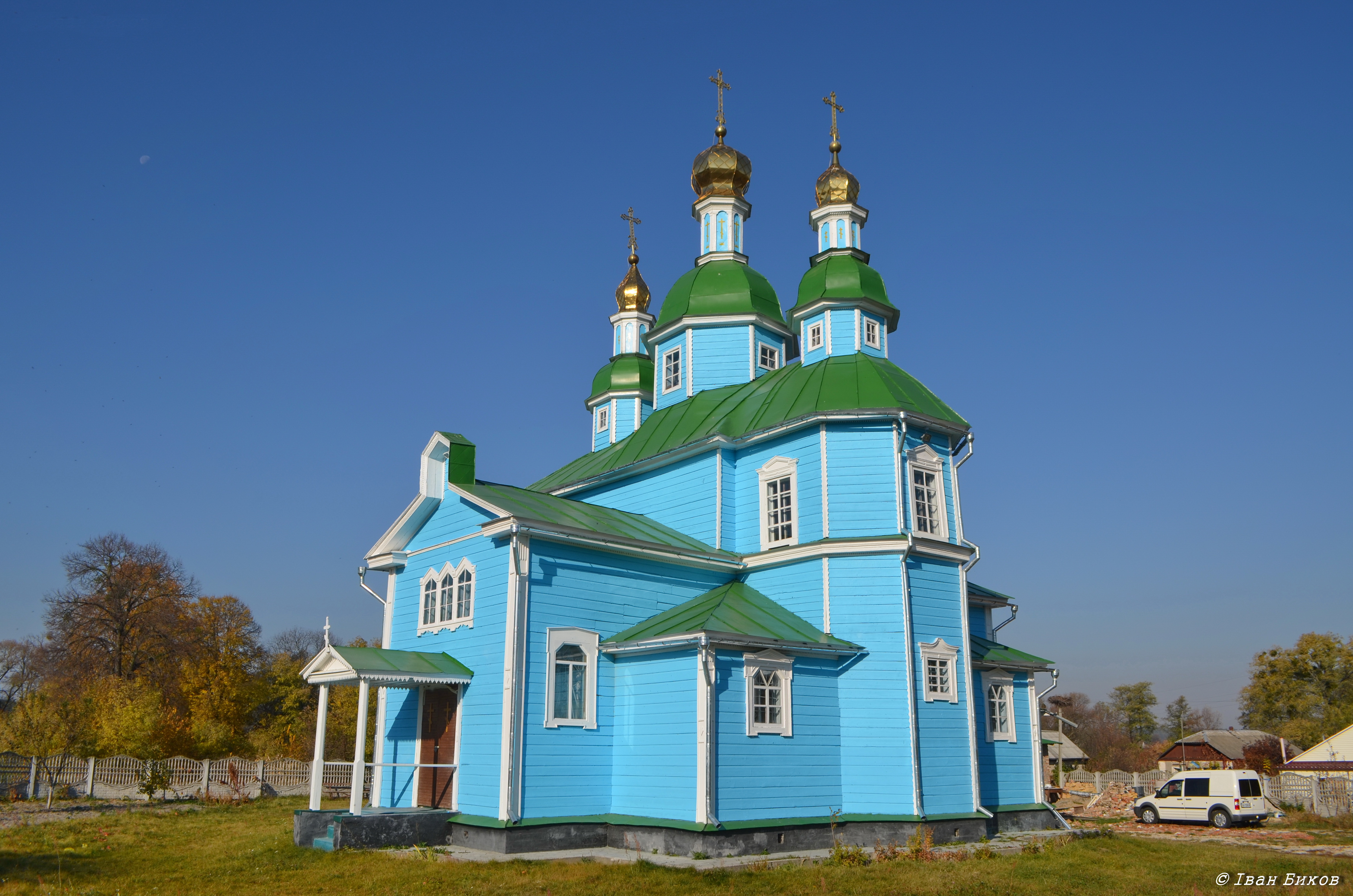
Saint Onuphrius Church in Lypovyi Skytok

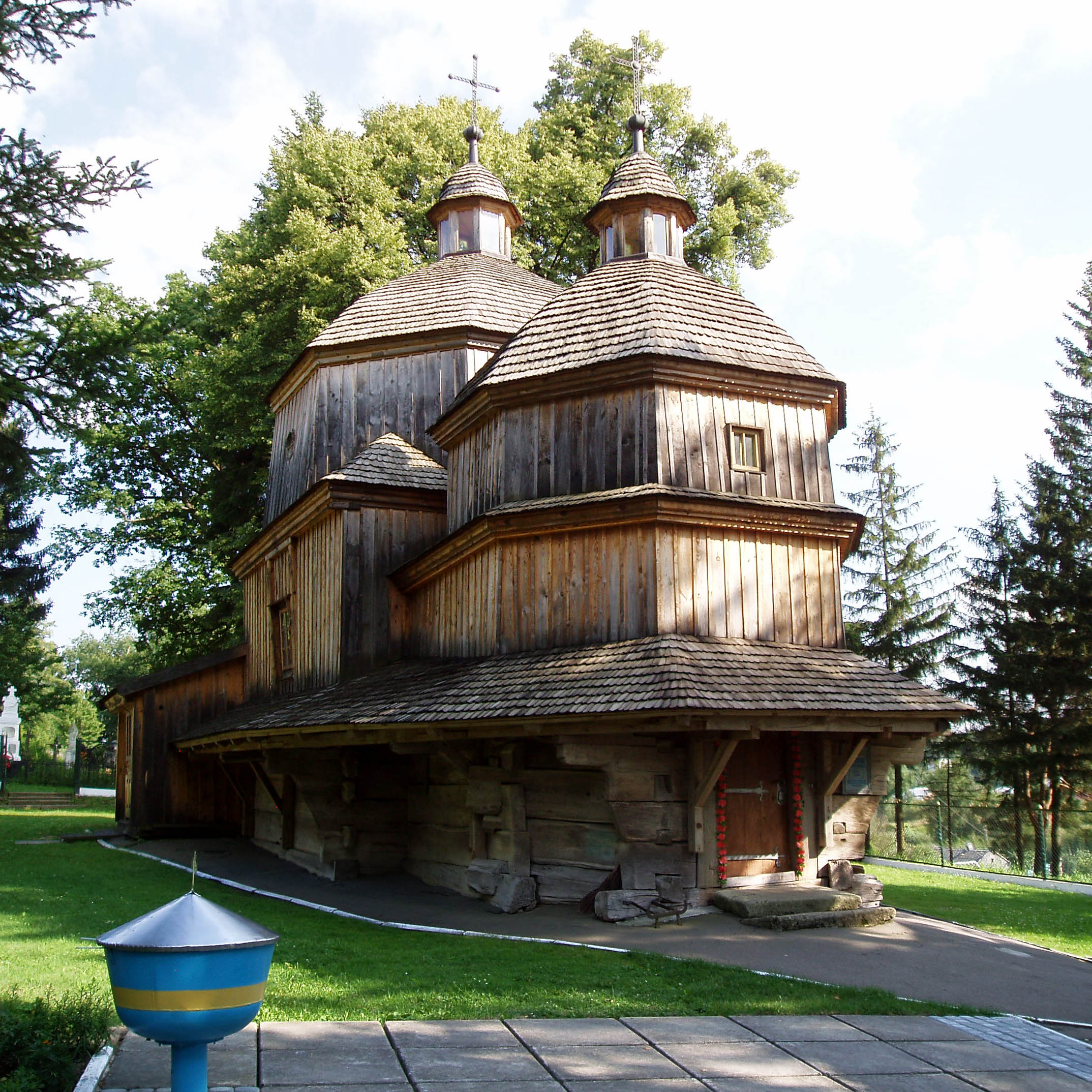
Candlemas Church in Cherepyn

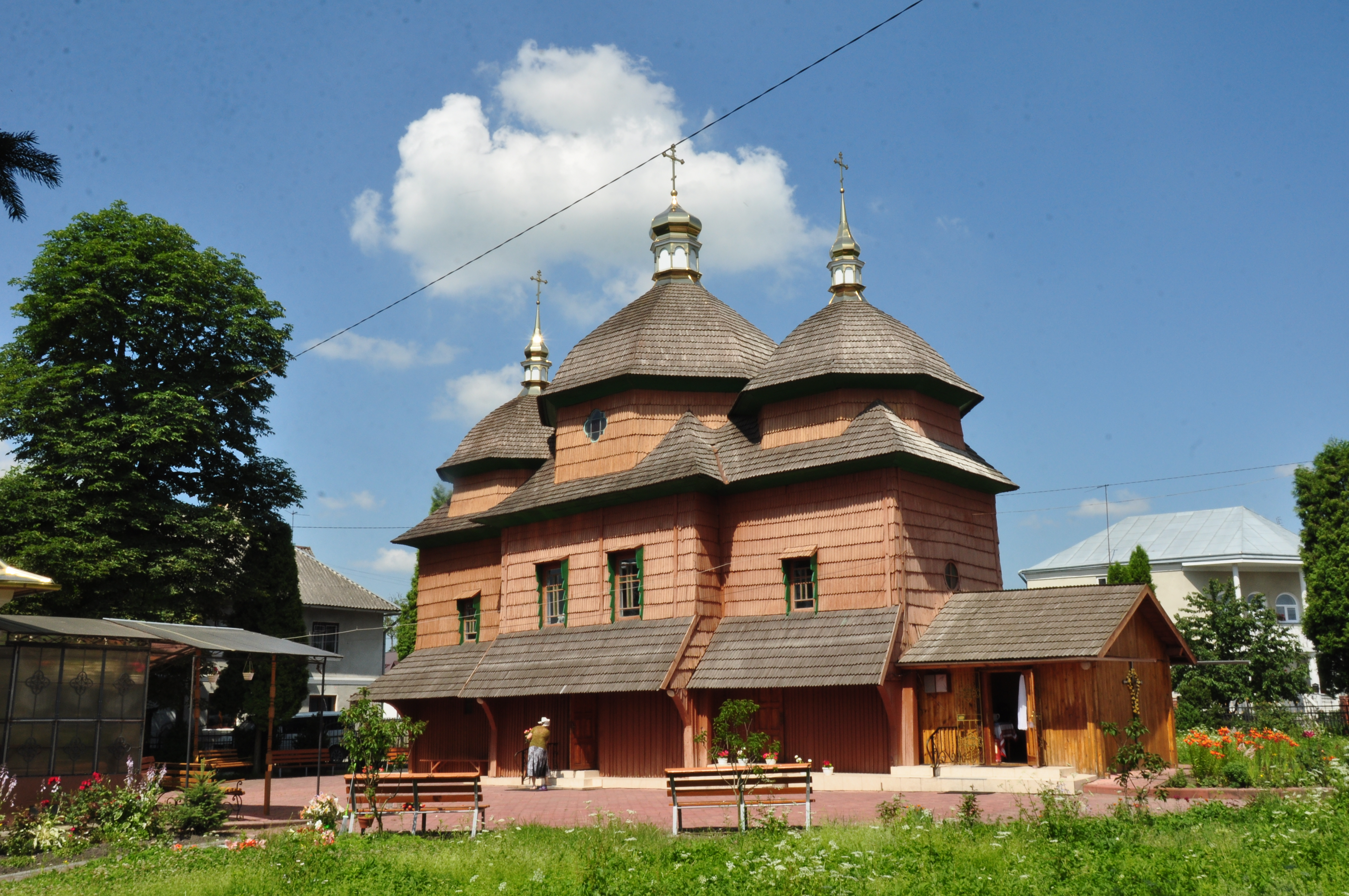
John the Baptist Church in Horodok

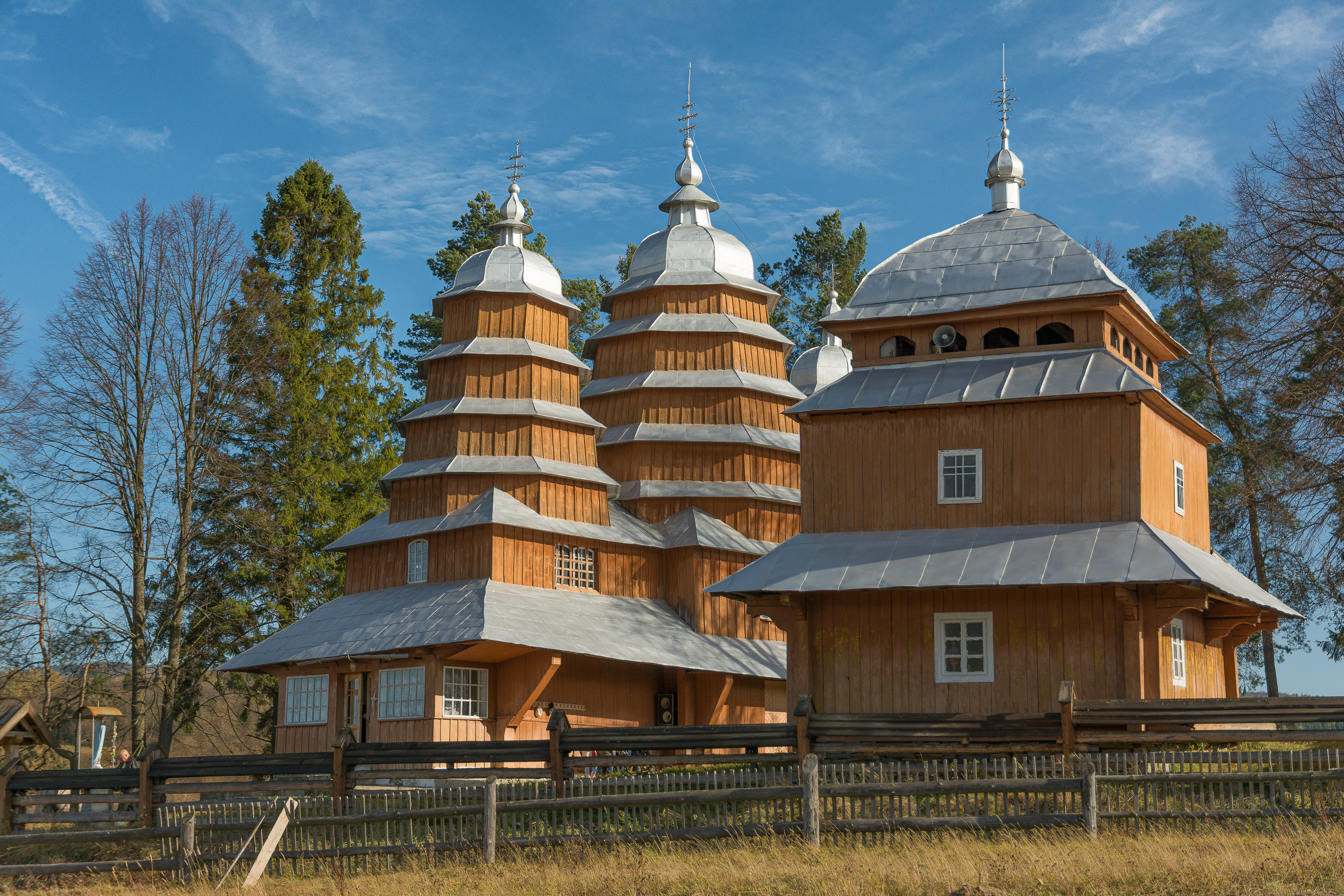
Matkiv church

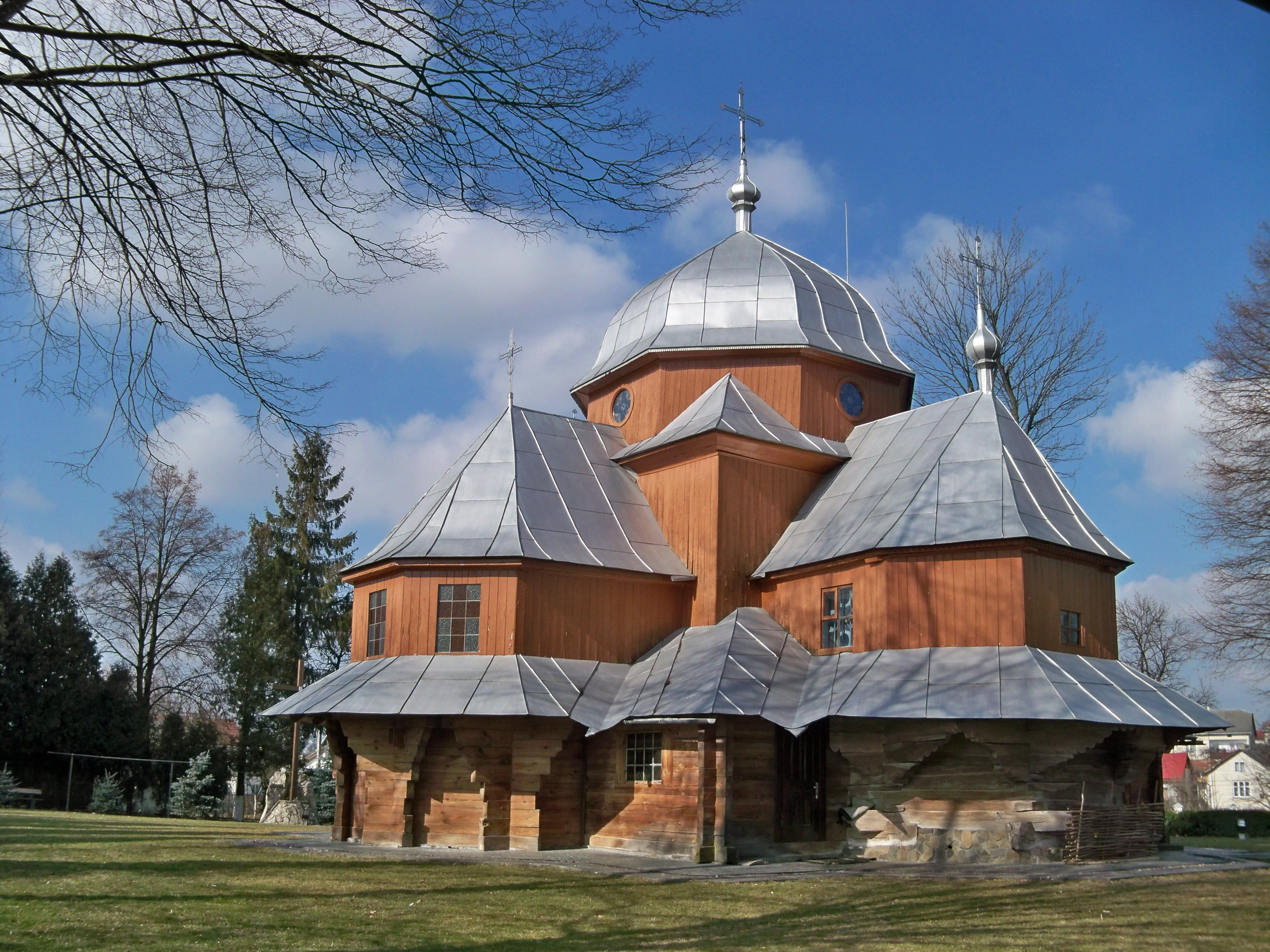
Church of the Nativity of the Theotokos in Yavoriv

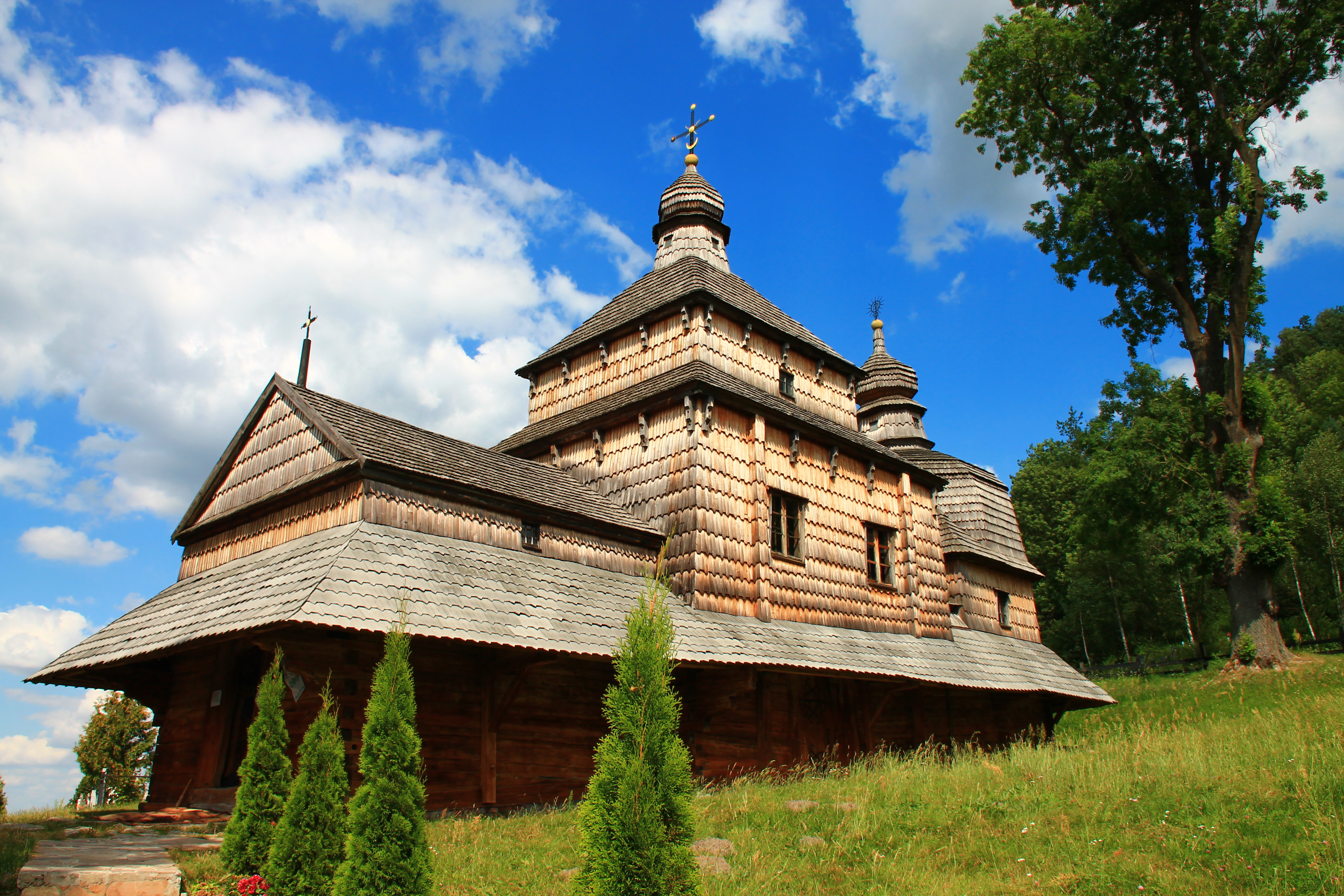
Church of the Holy Spirit in Potelych

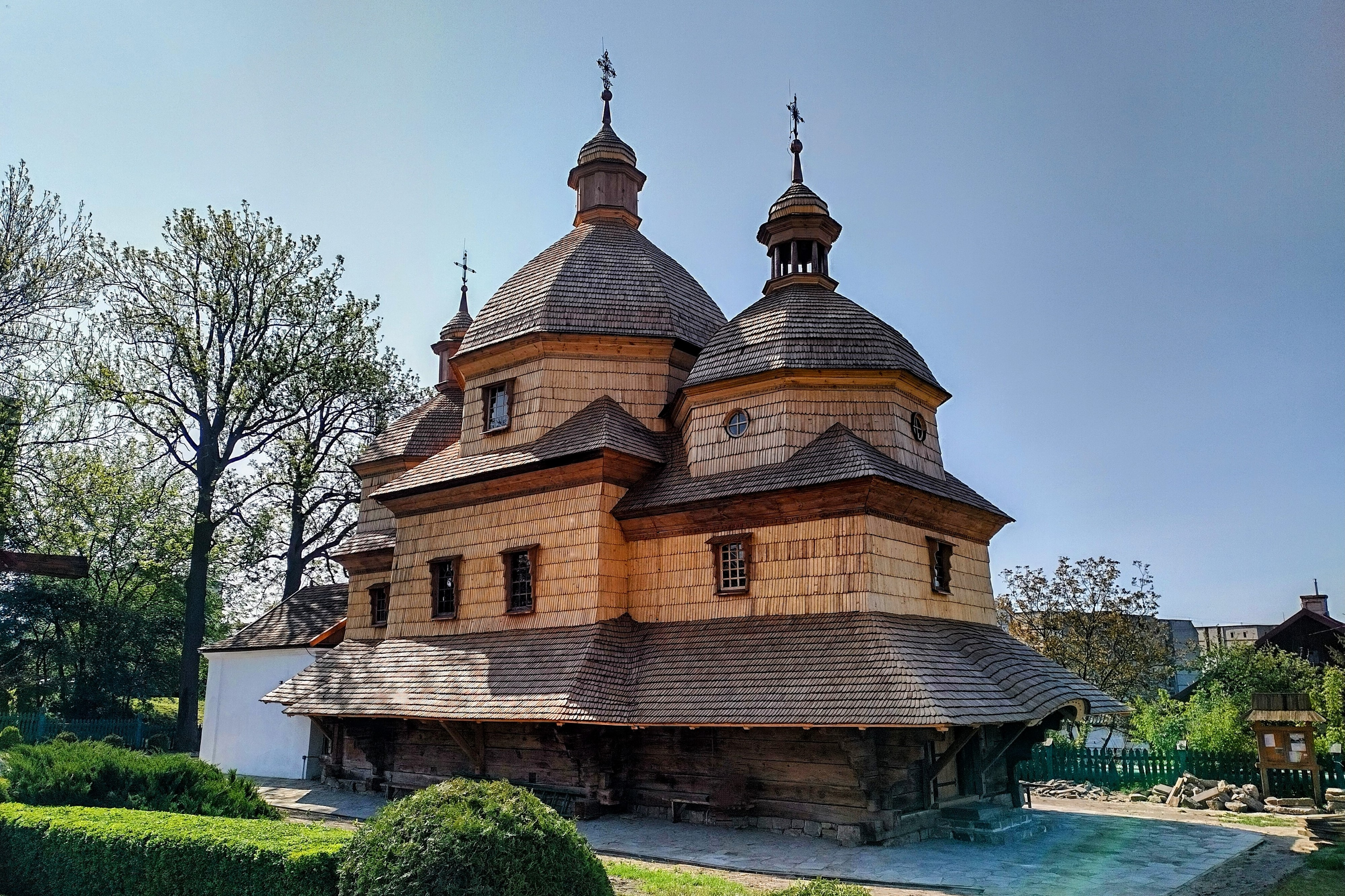
Trinity Church in Zhovkva

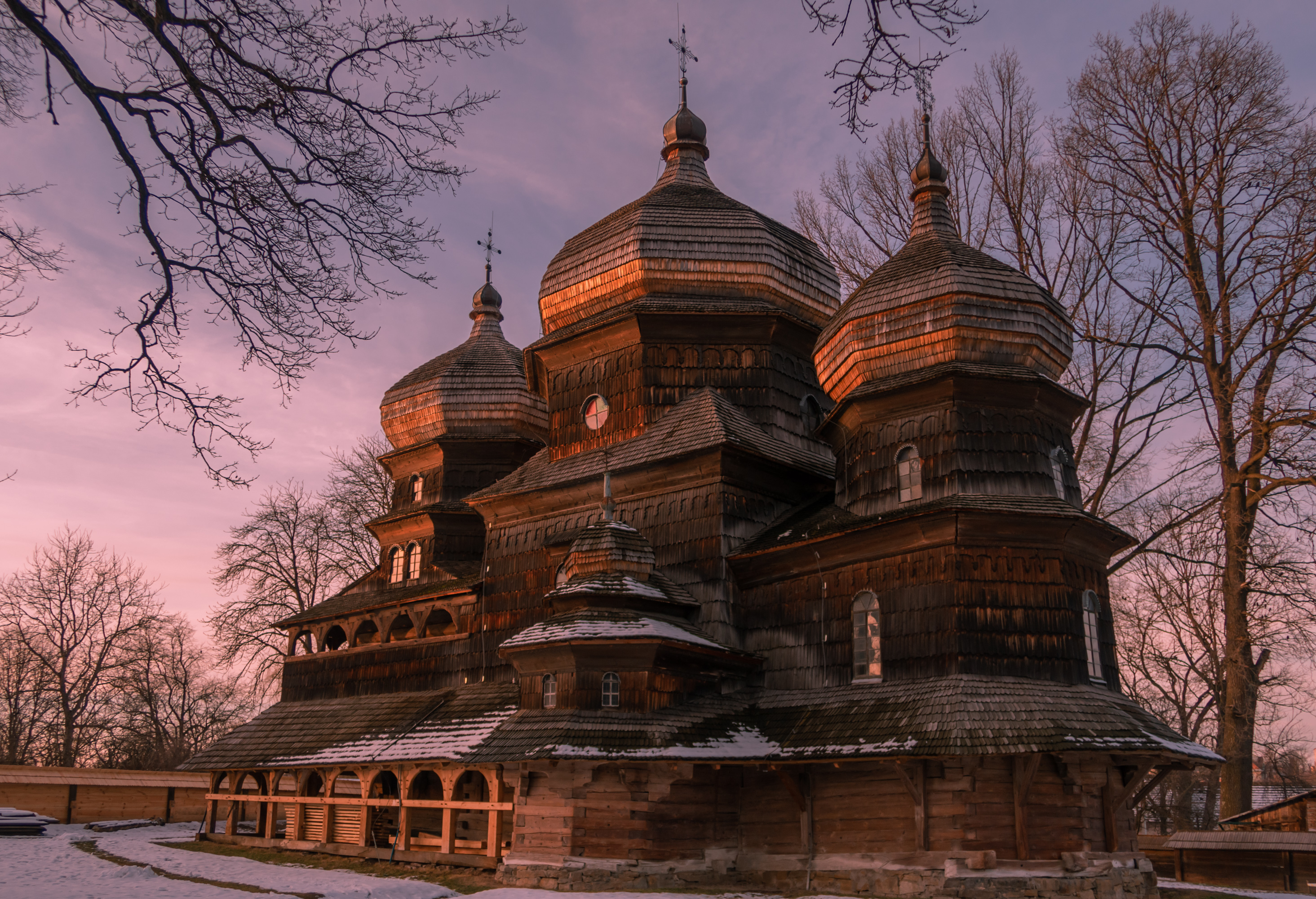
St. George's Church in Drohobych, western Ukraine

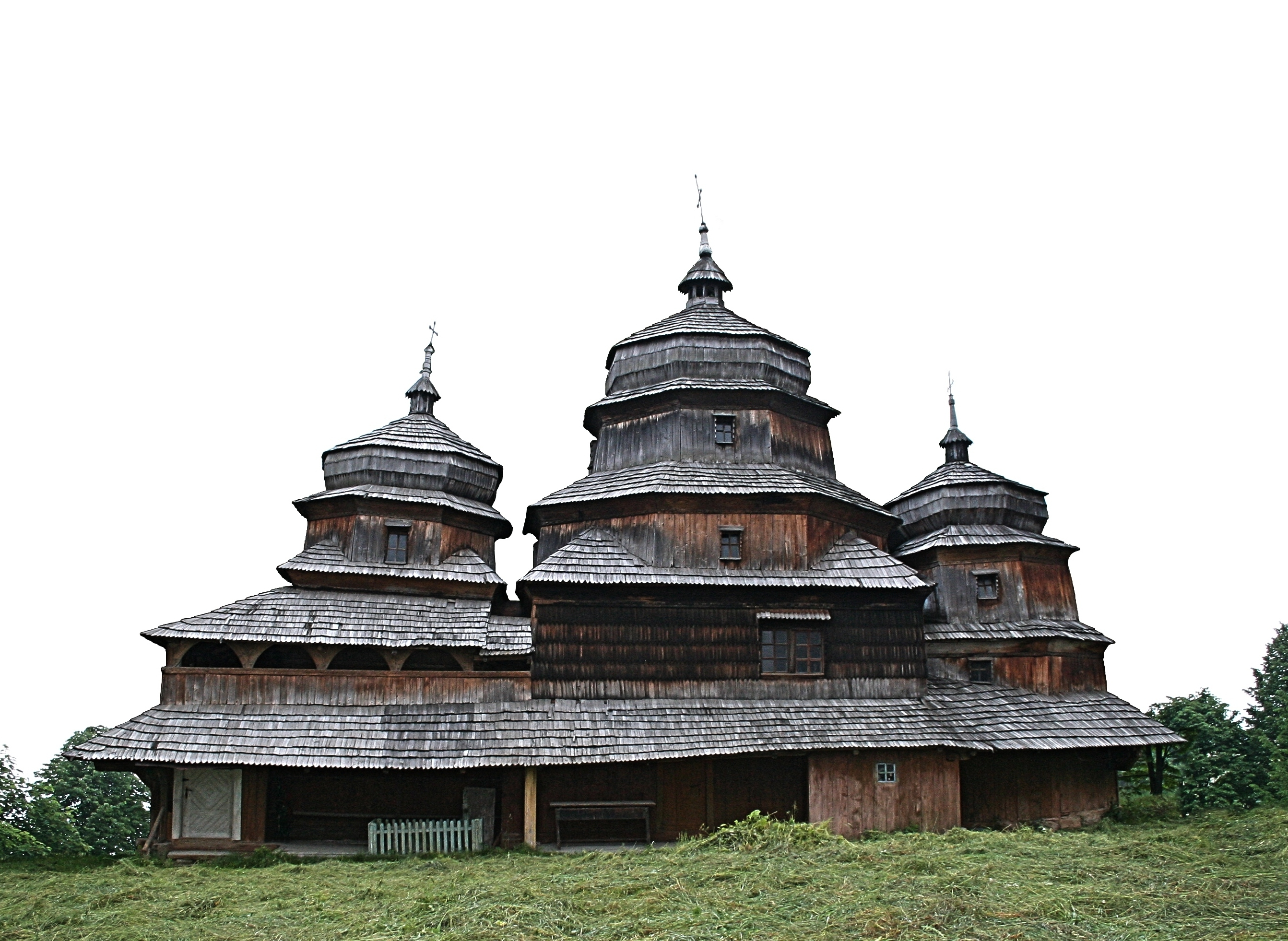
Wooden church in Isai

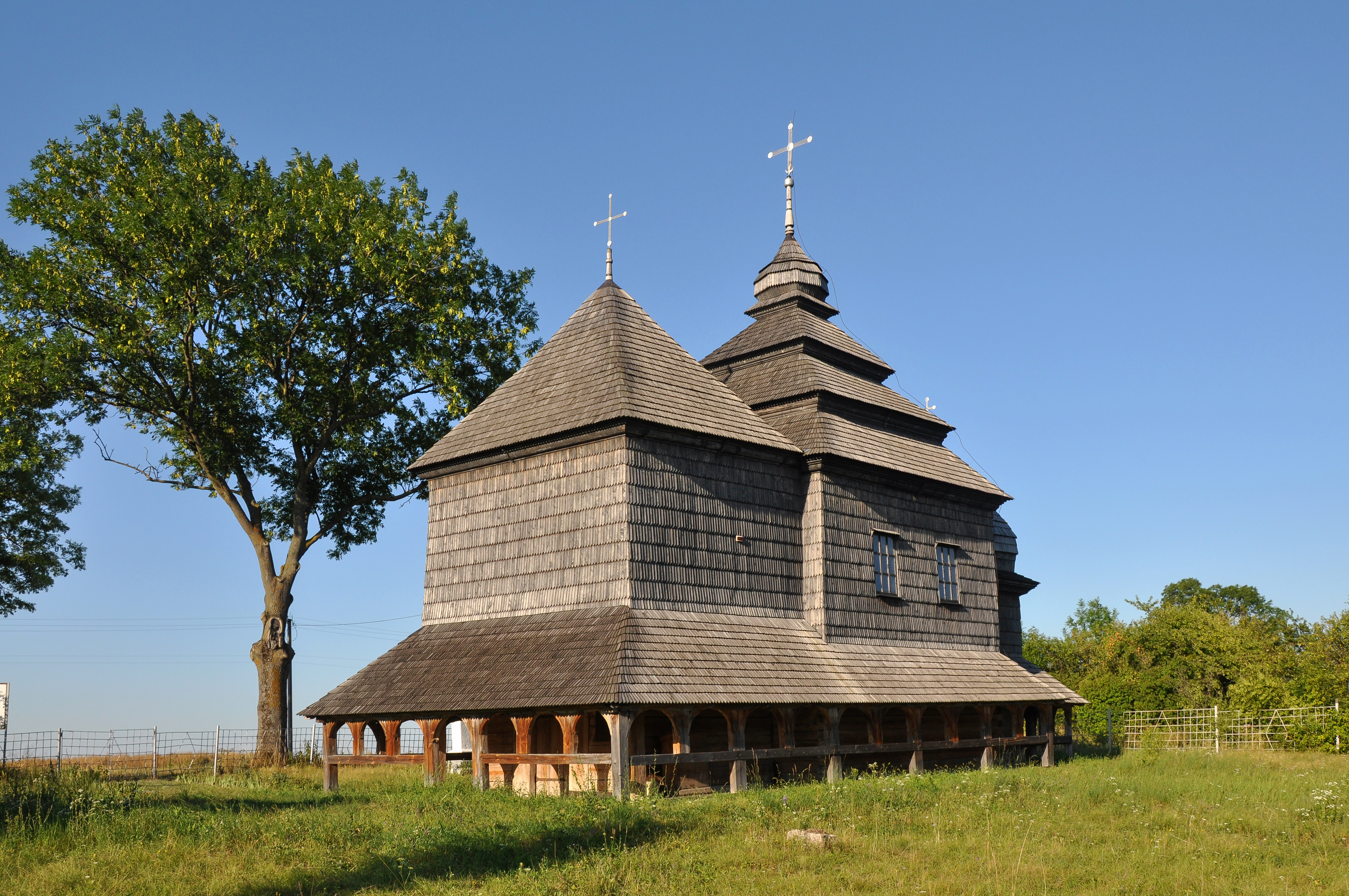
Kuty St Michael's Church

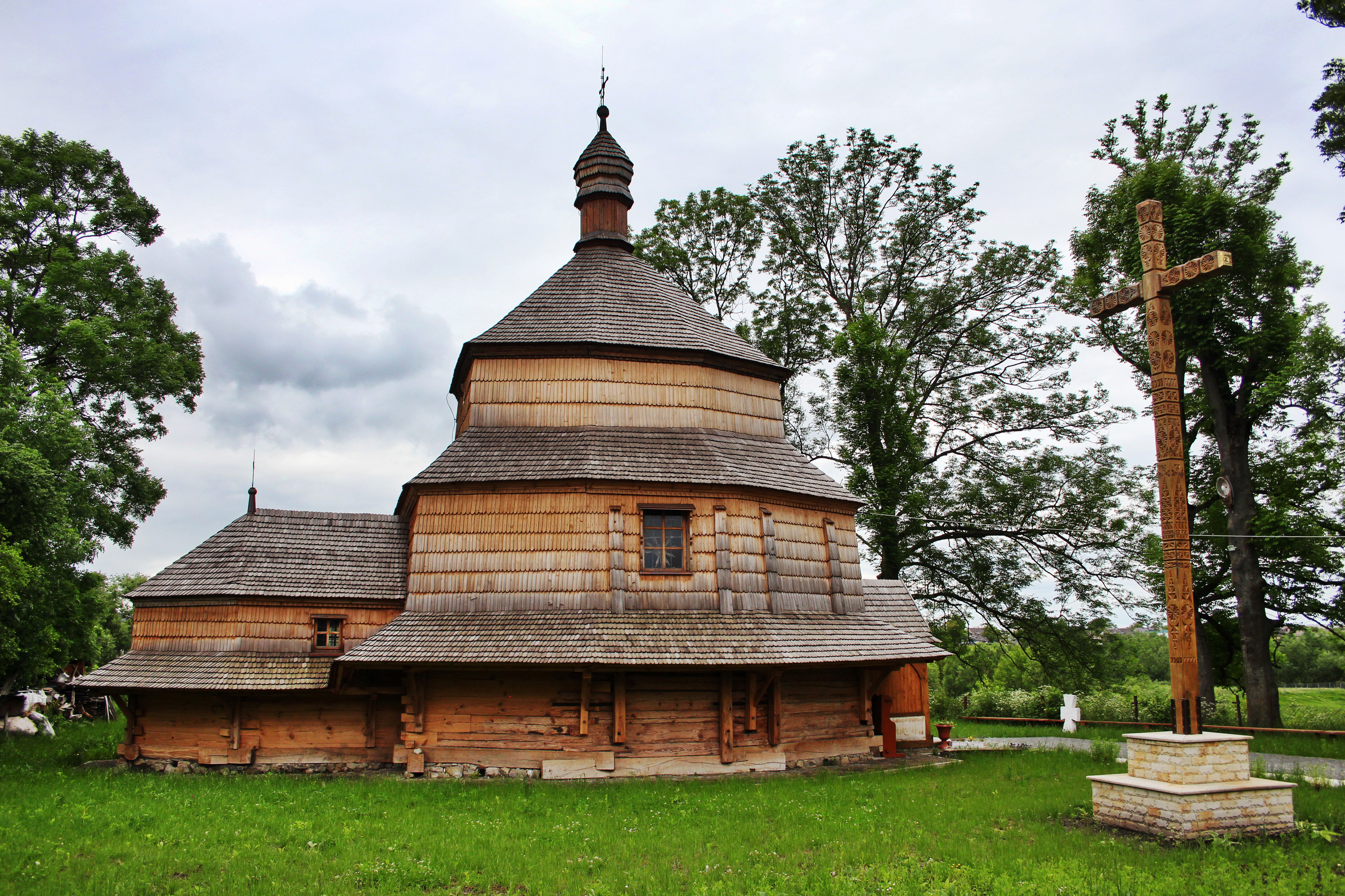
Saint Paraskeva's Church in Busk

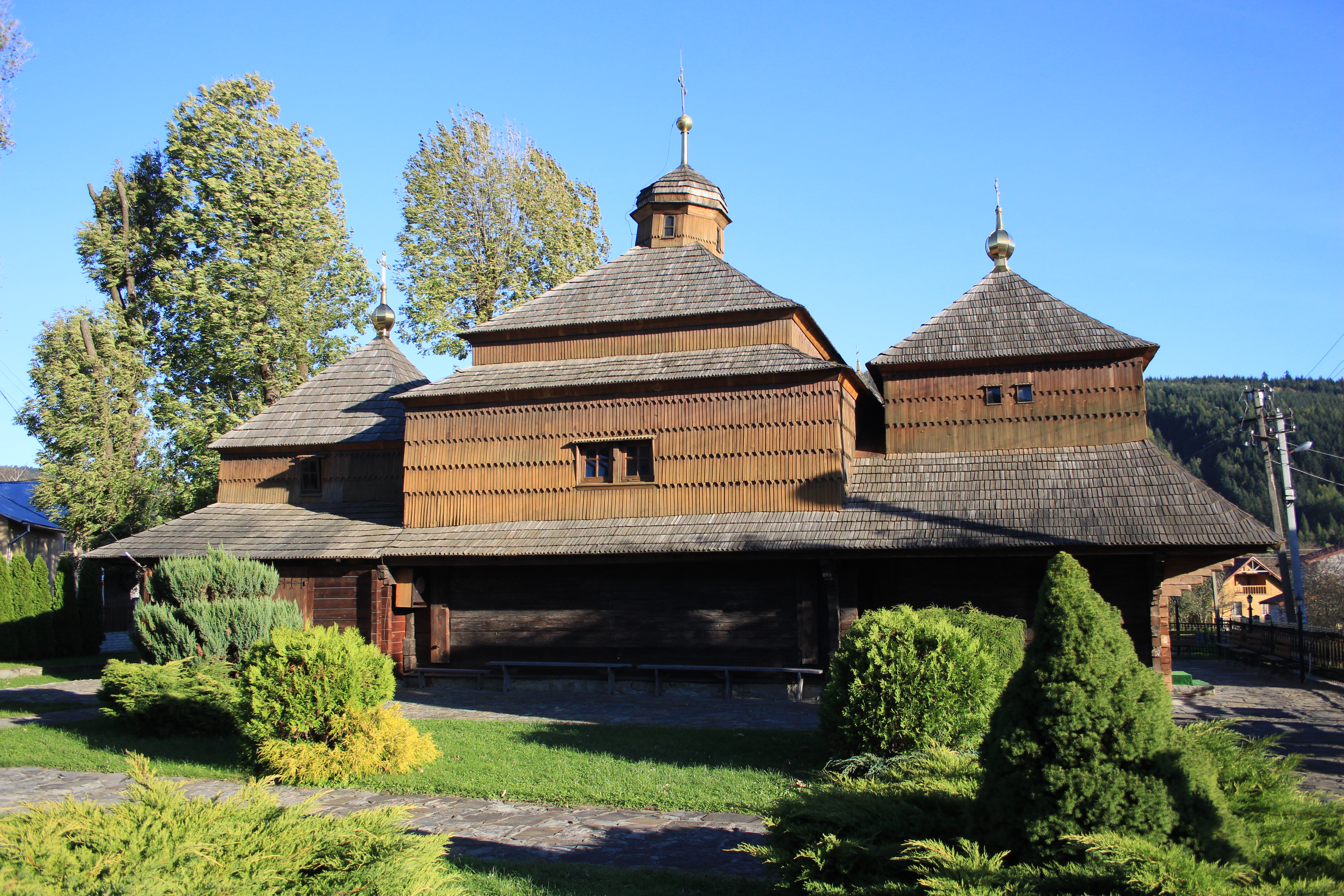
Wooden church in Skole

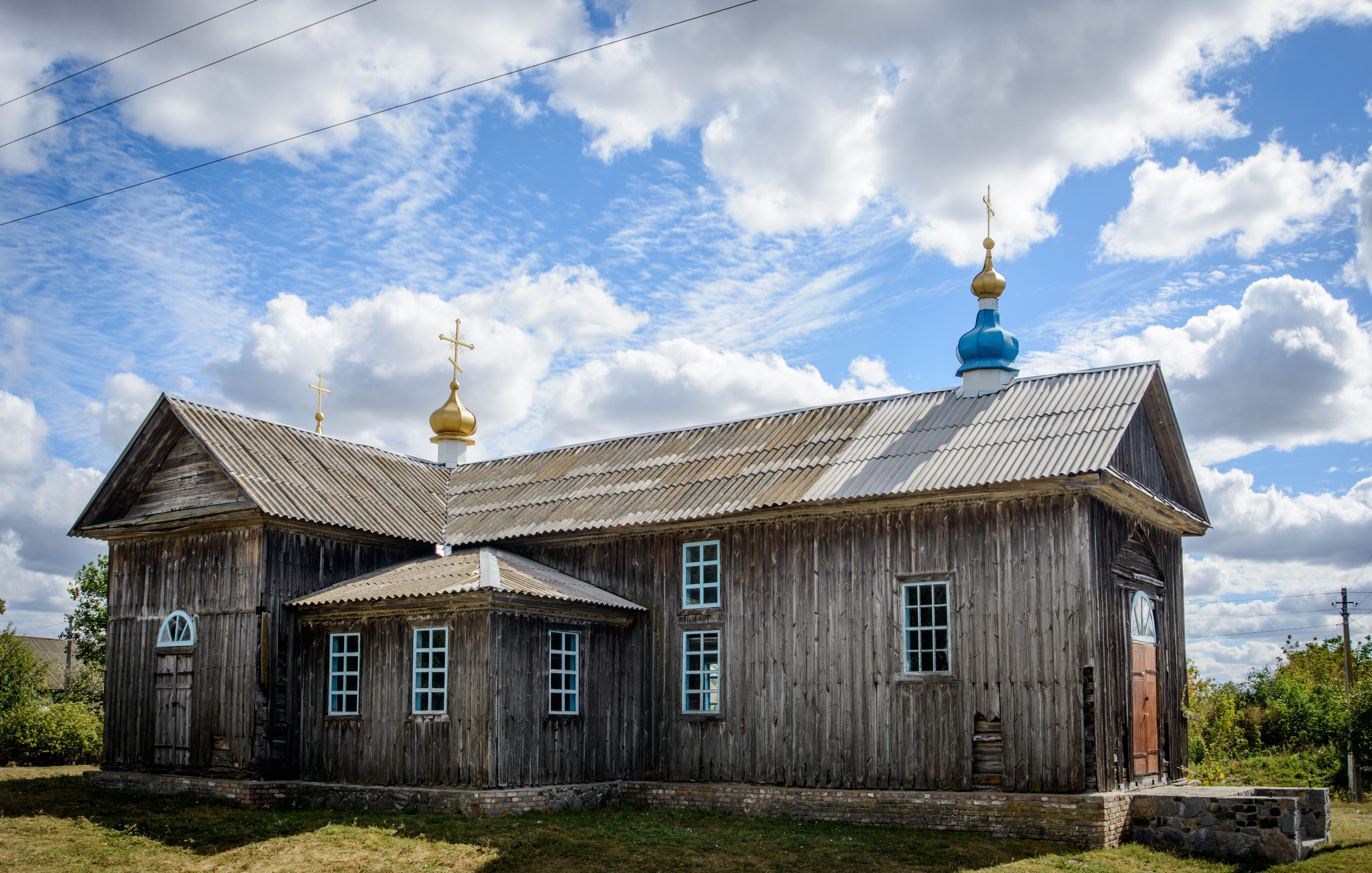
Vechirky church

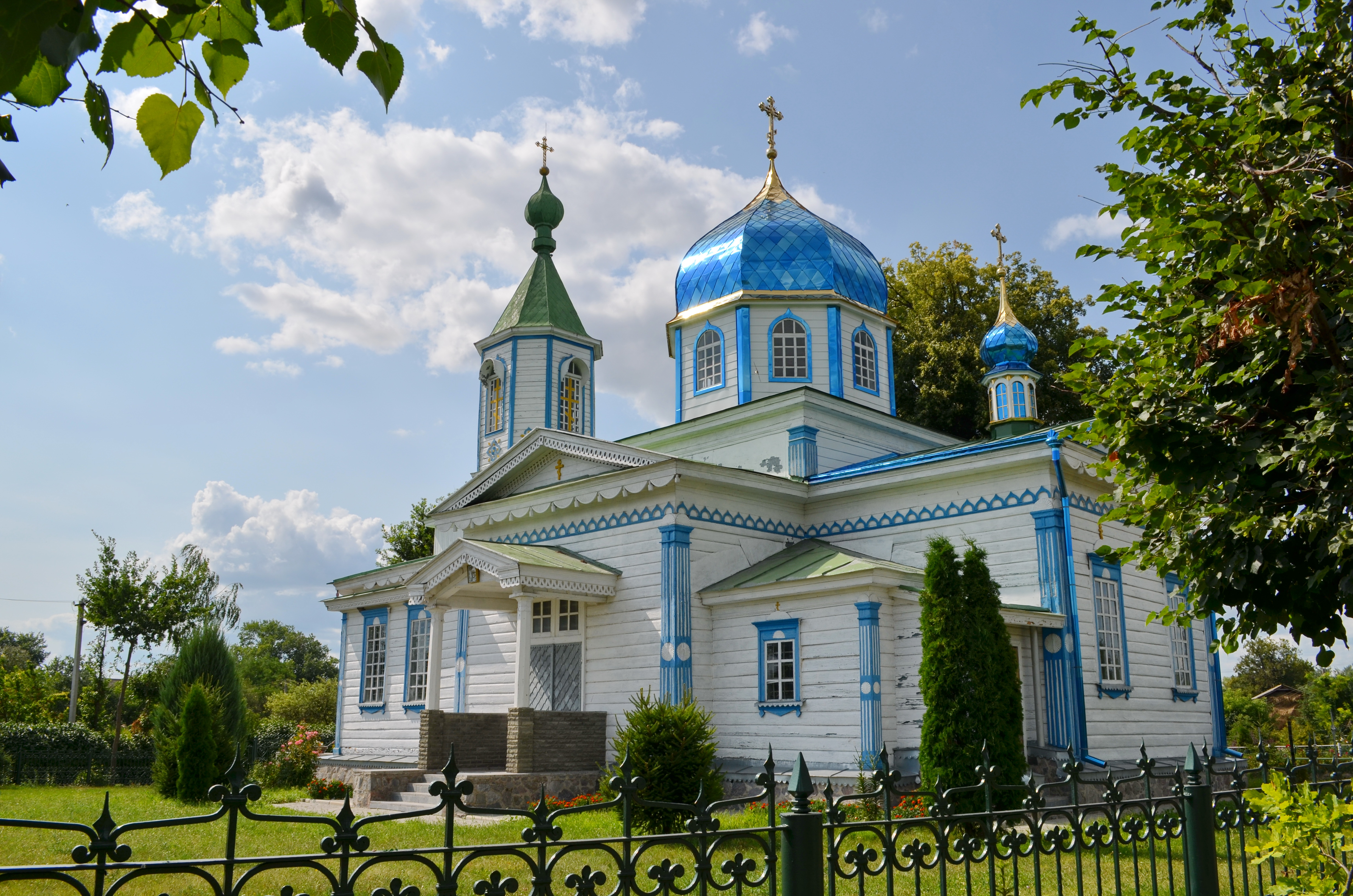
Intercession Church in Maltsi

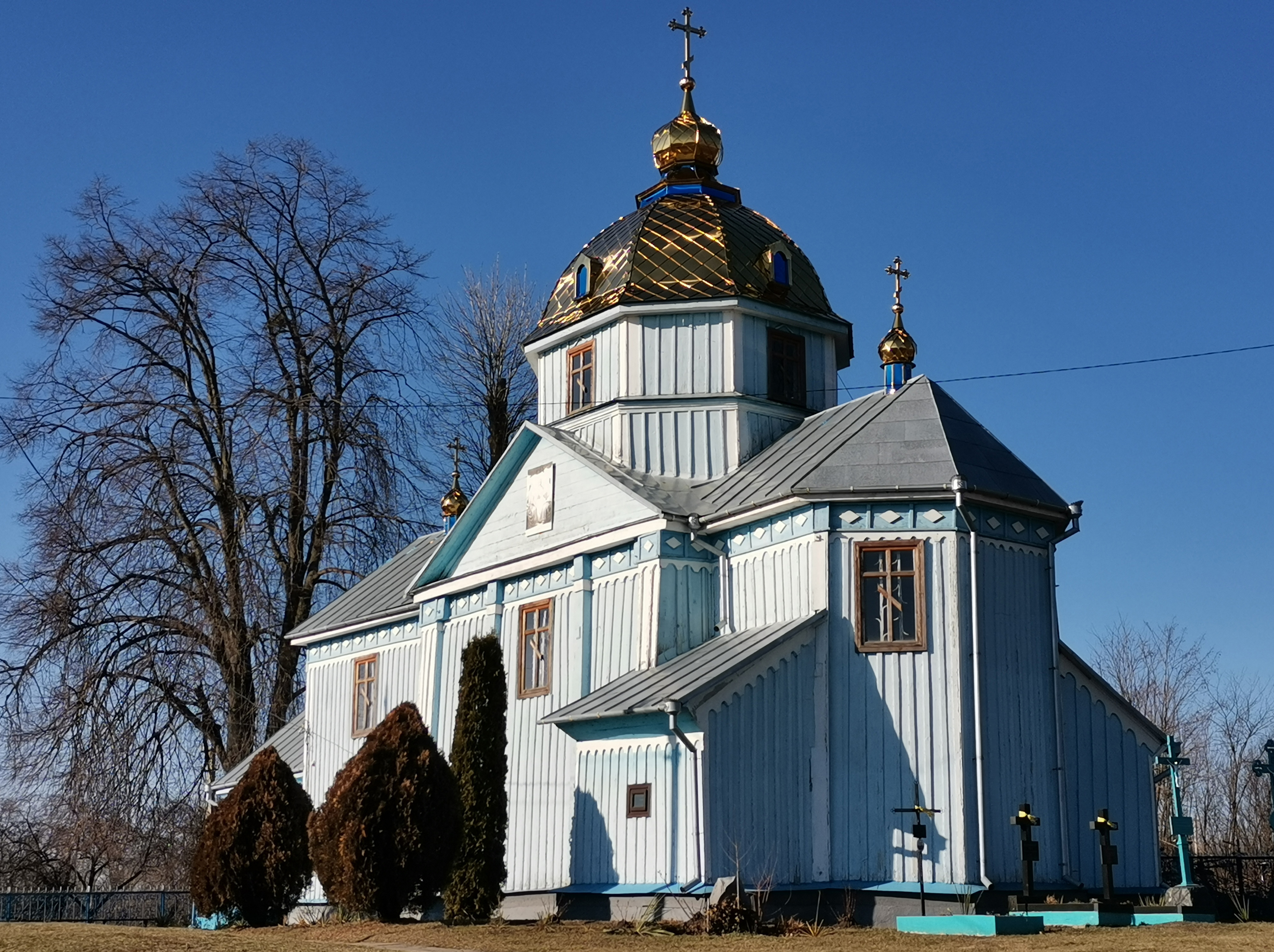
Church of Saint John the Evangelist in Syniv

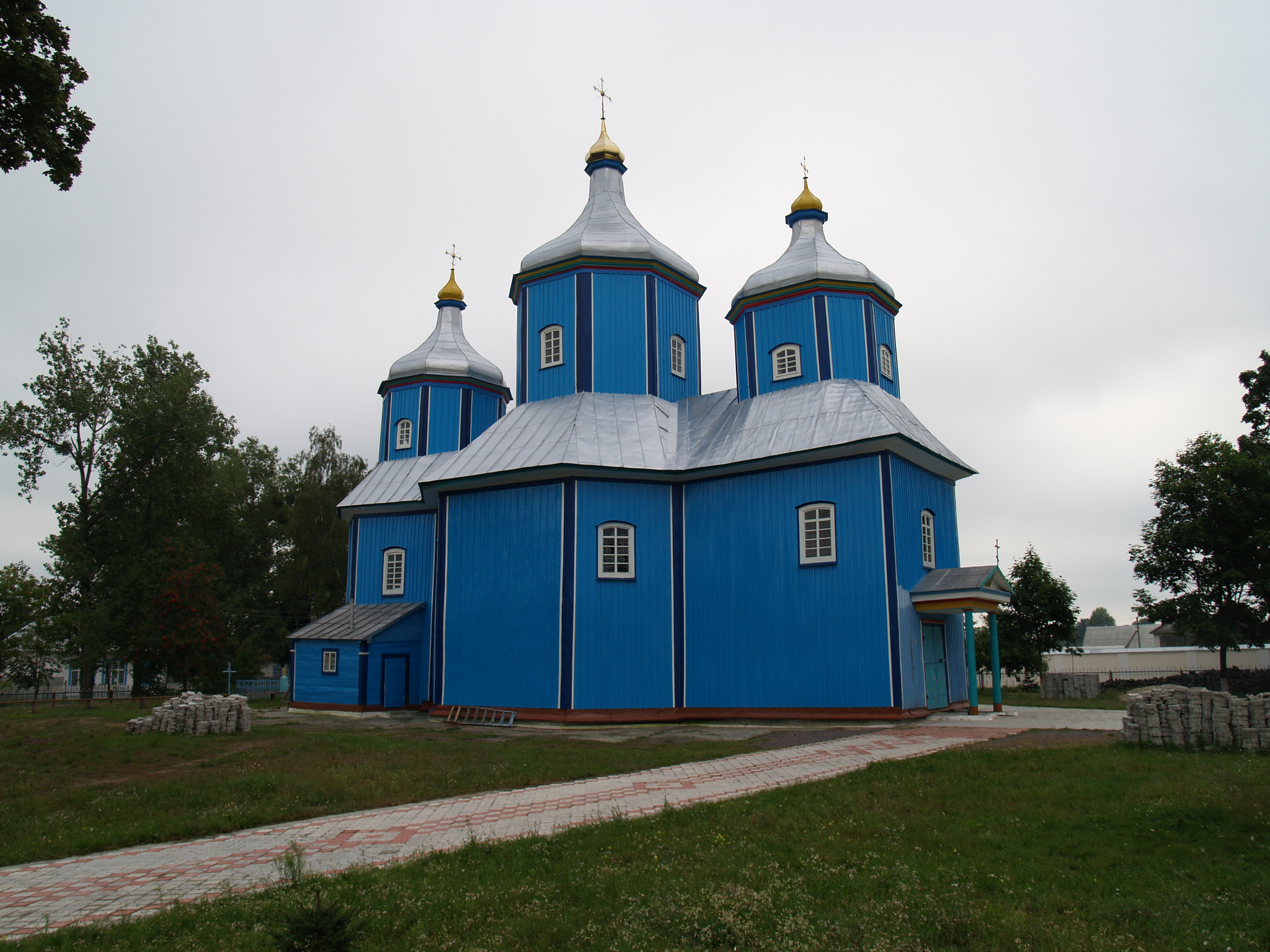
Saint Demetrius Church in Sernyky

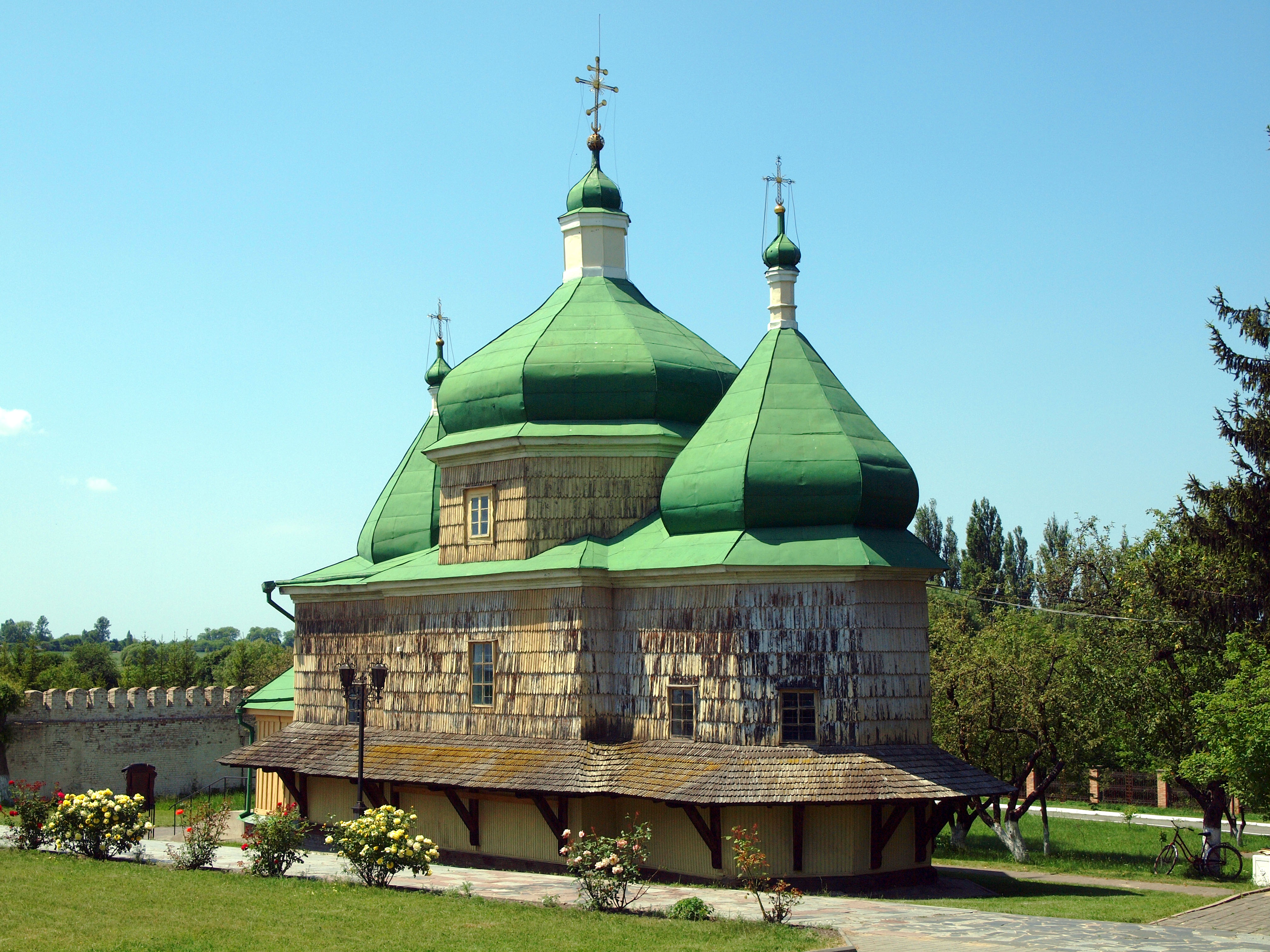
Church in Pliasheva

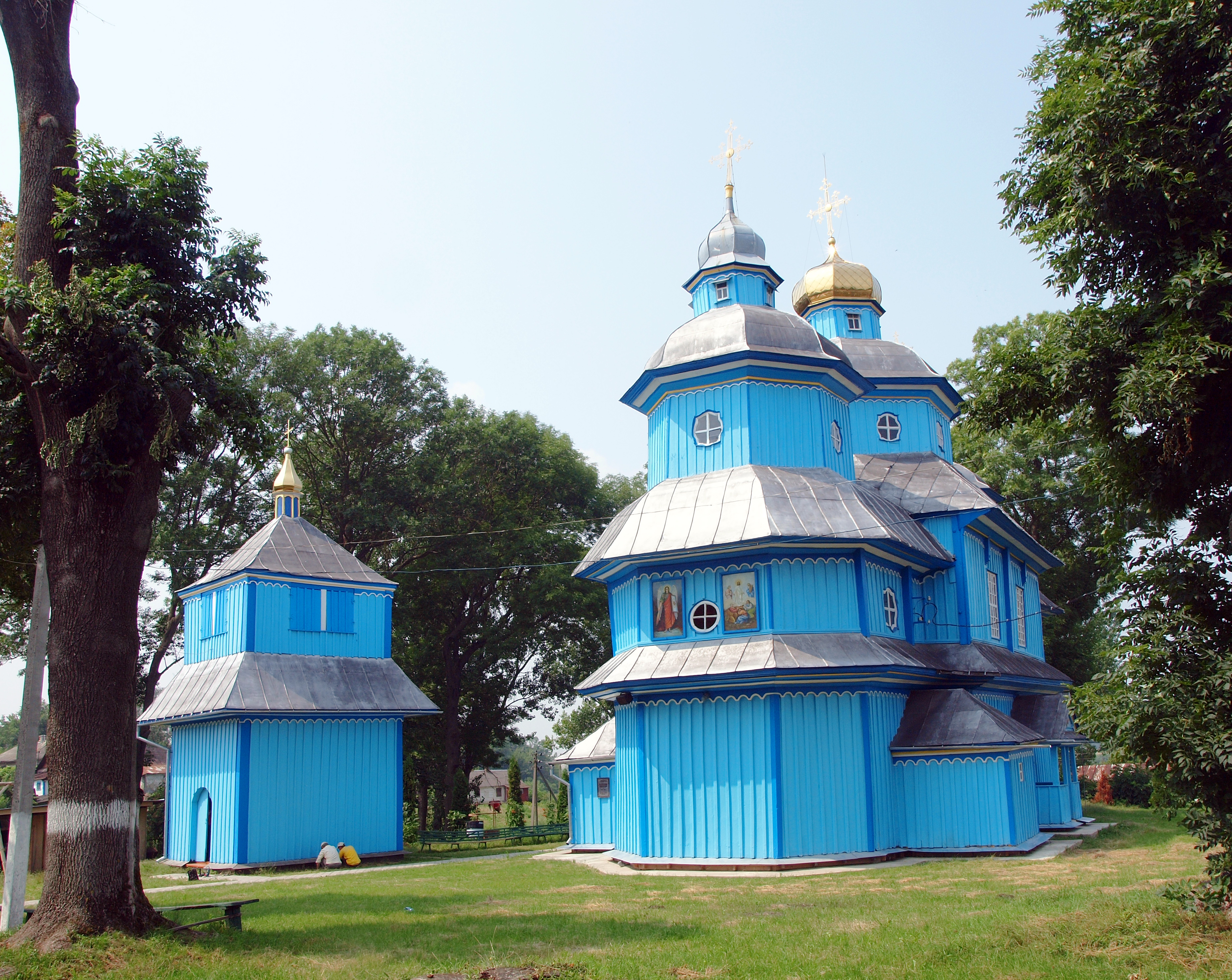
Church in Tuchyn

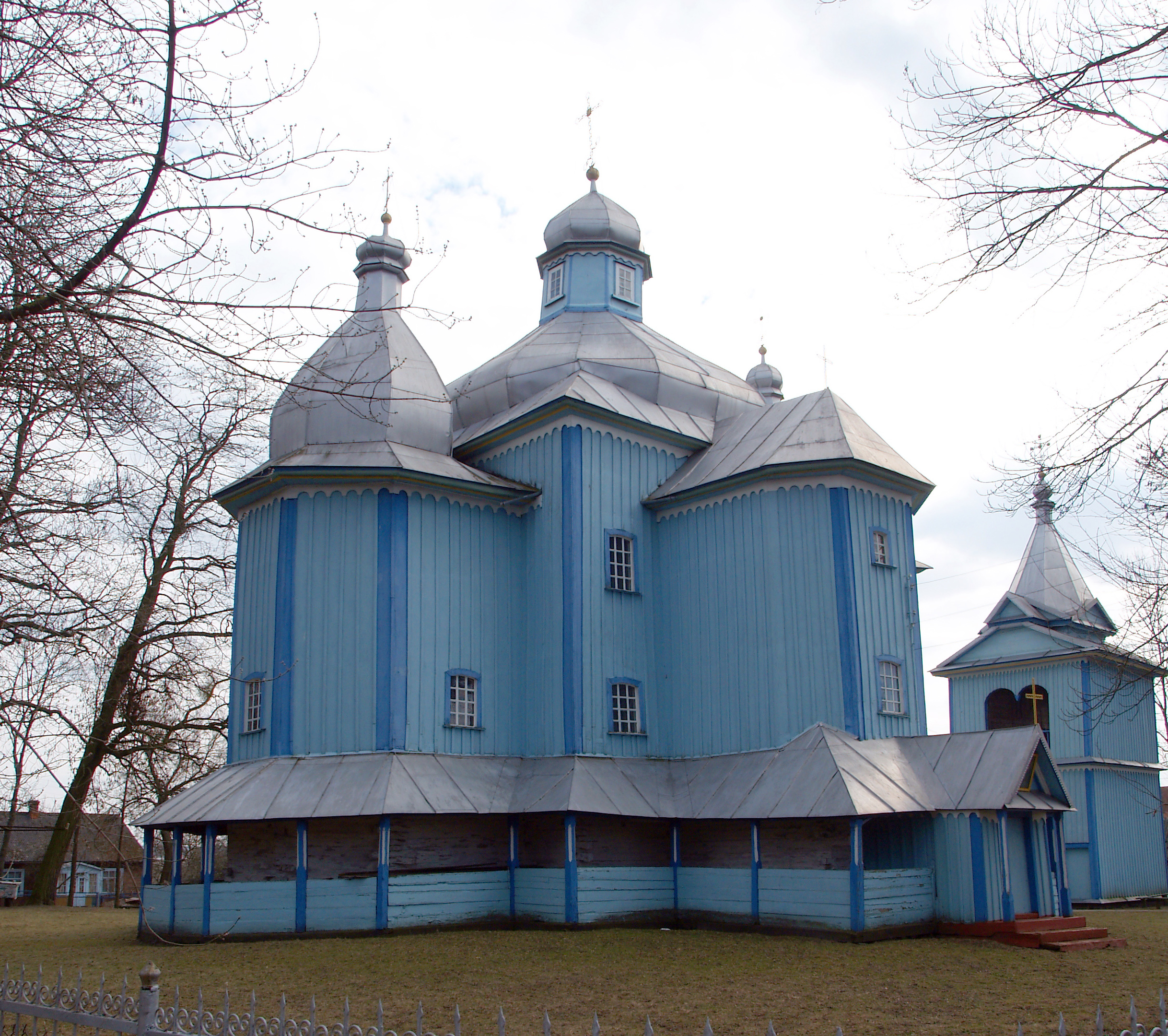
Trinity Church in Stepan

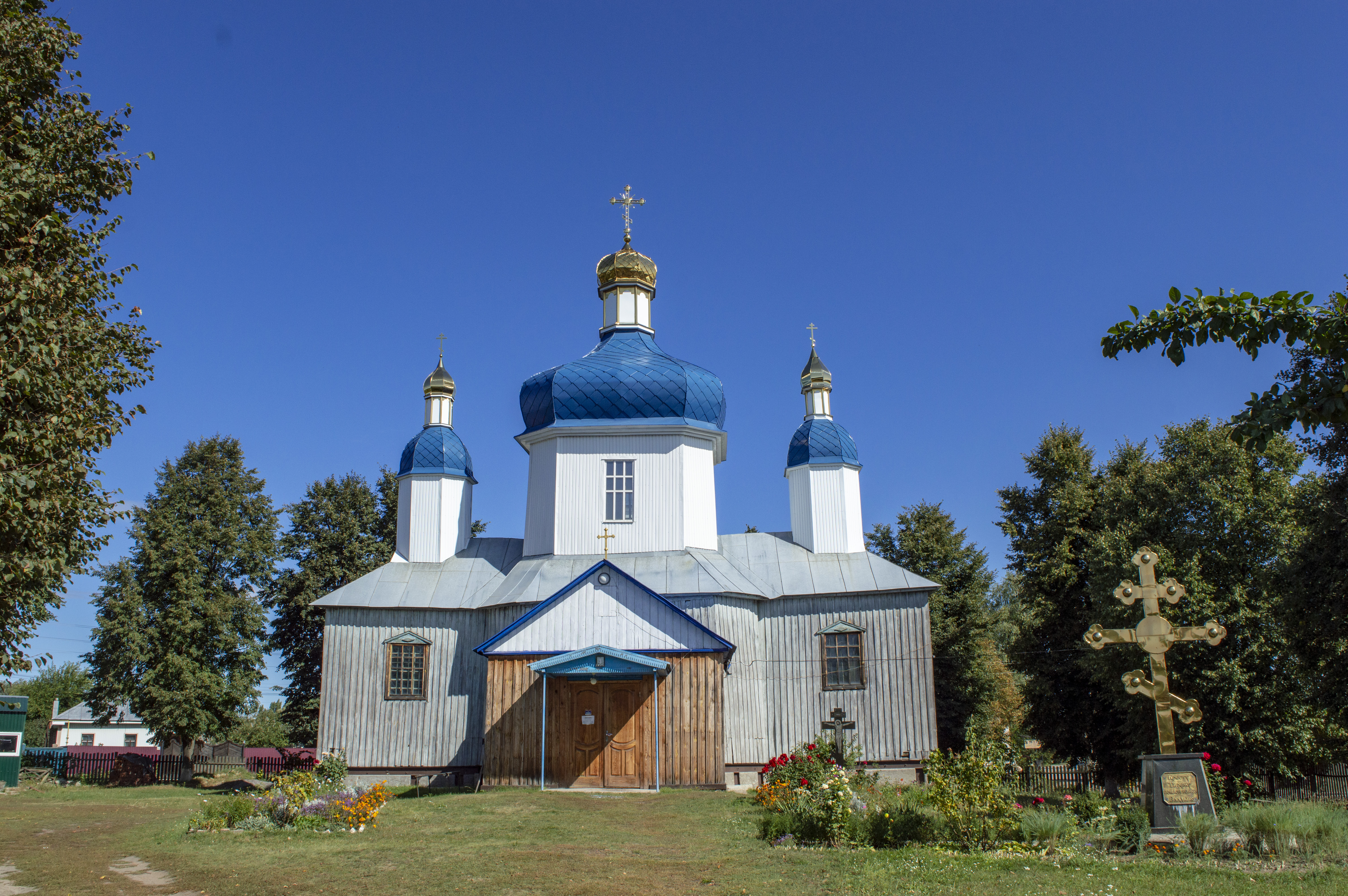
Resurrection Church, Lebedyn

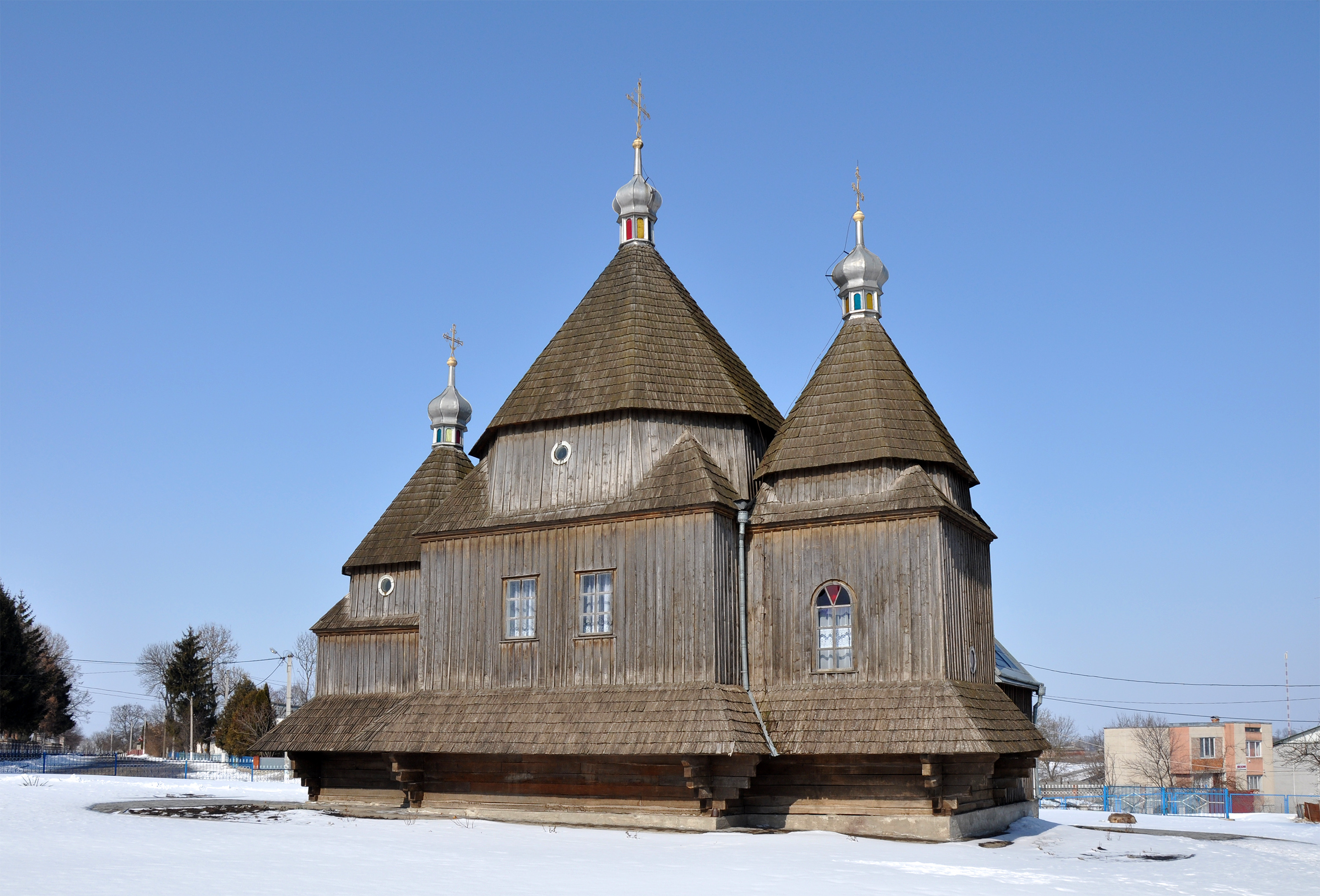
Wooden church in Skoryky

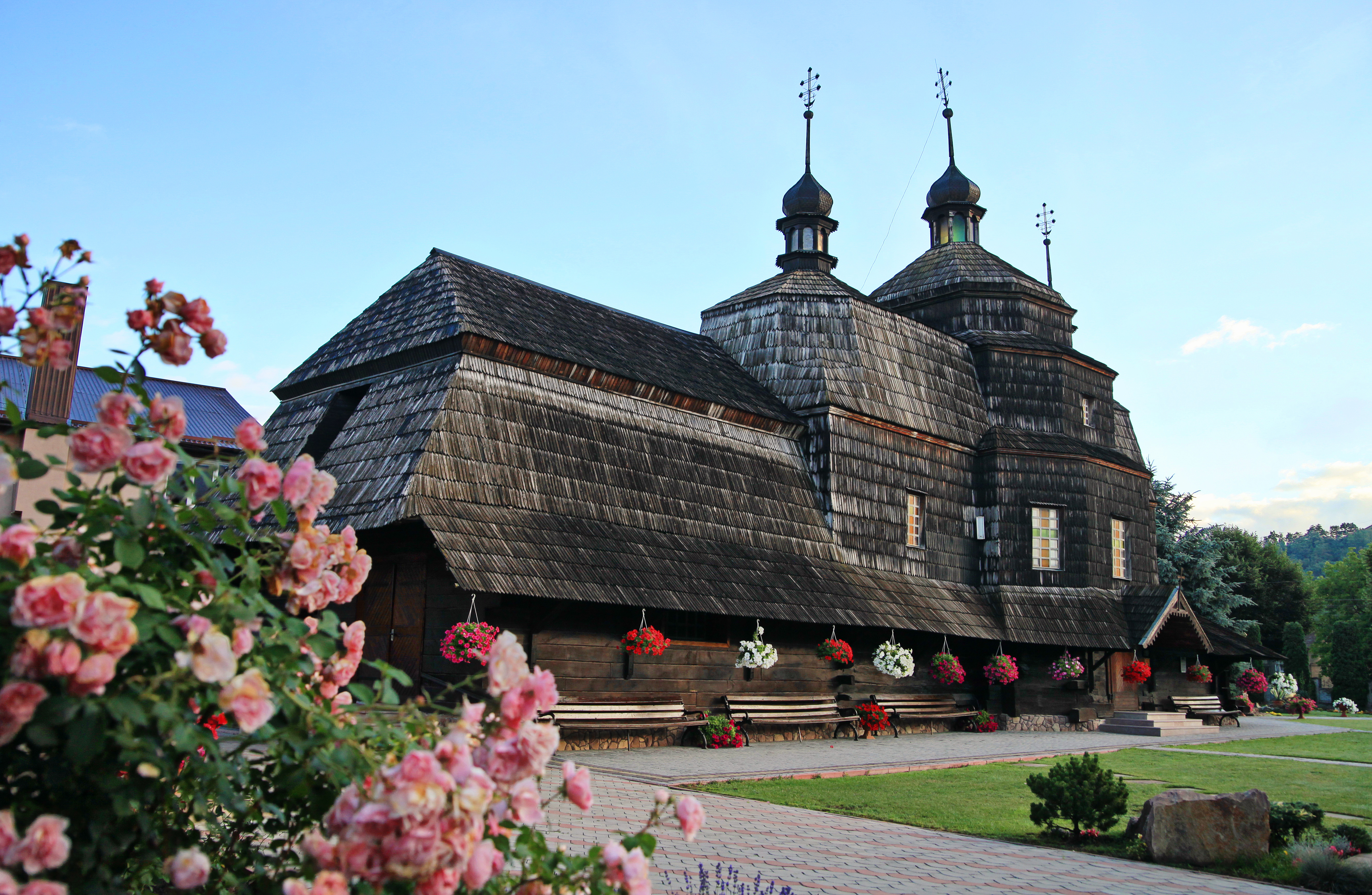
Church of the Ascension in Chortkiv

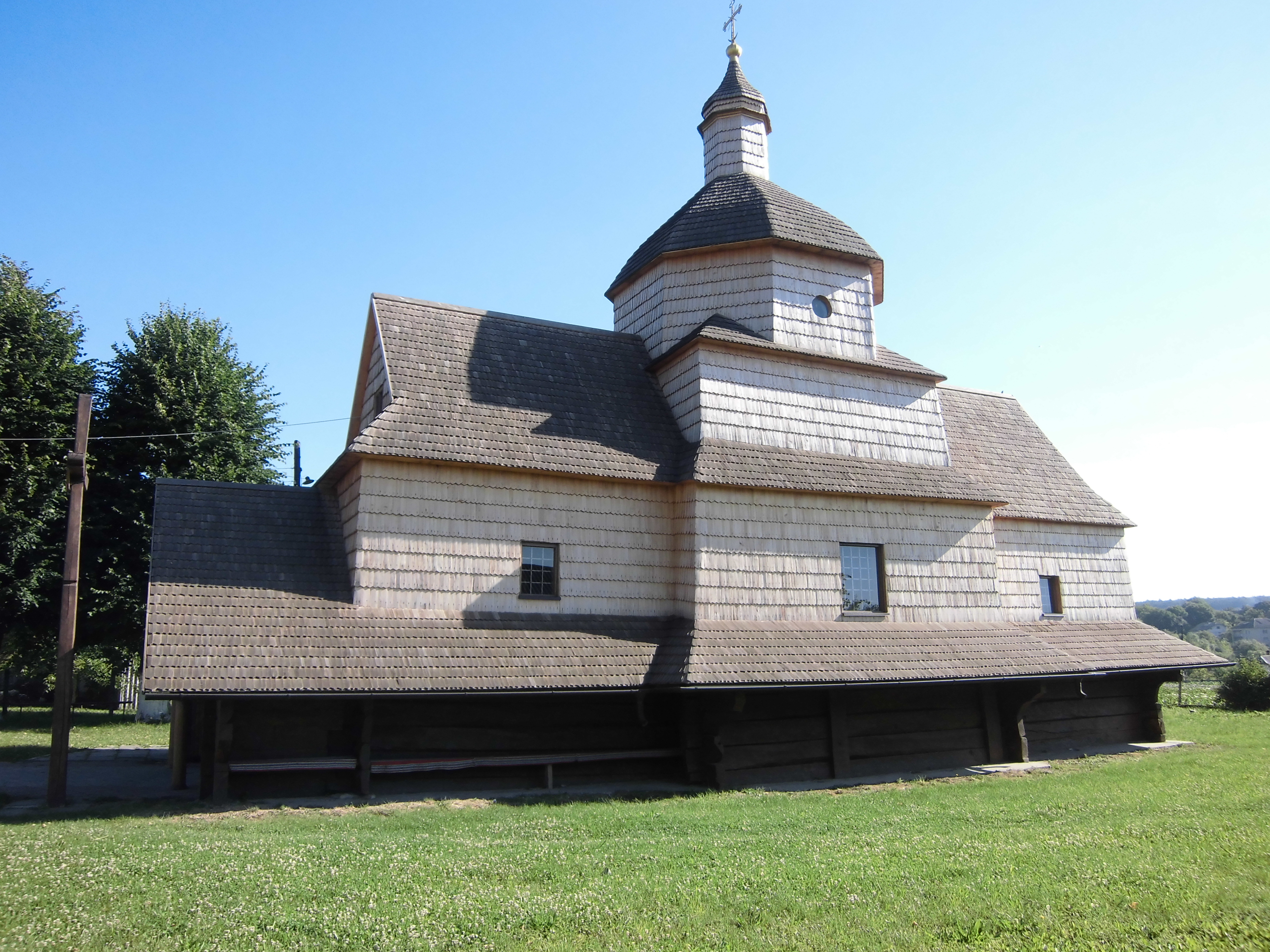
Wooden church in Kopychyntsi

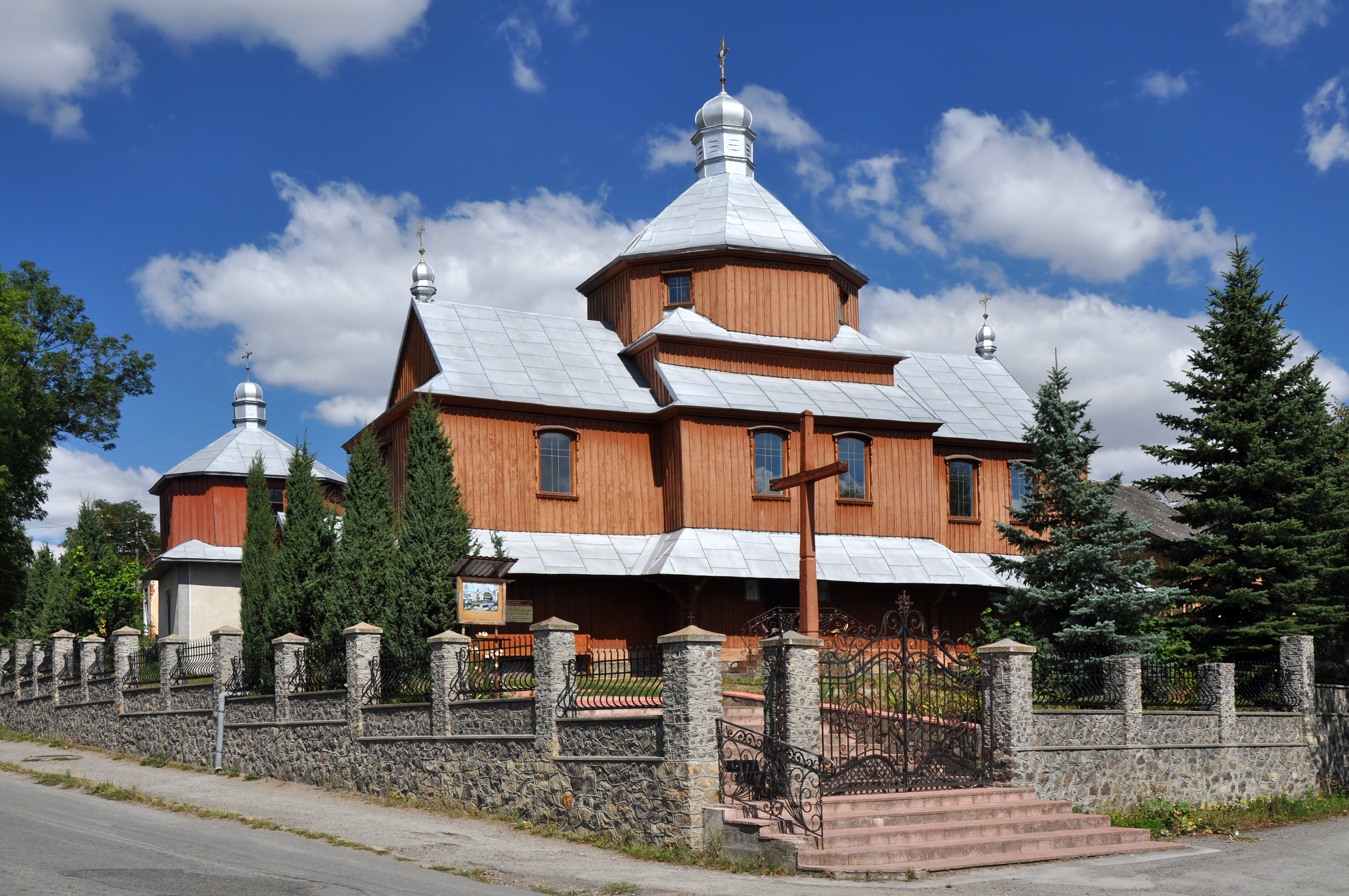
Monastyryska wooden church

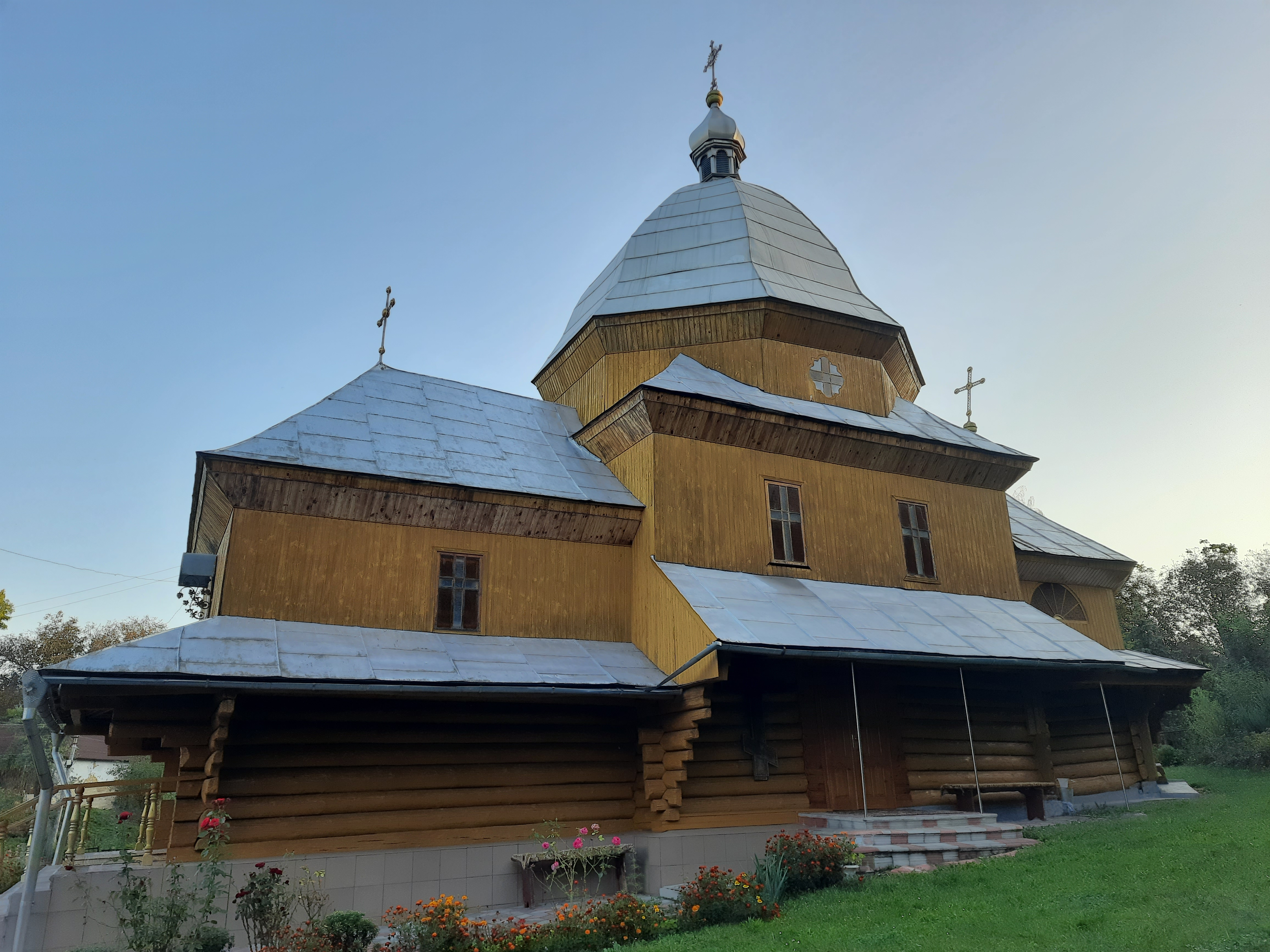
Saint Nicholas Church in Bokiv

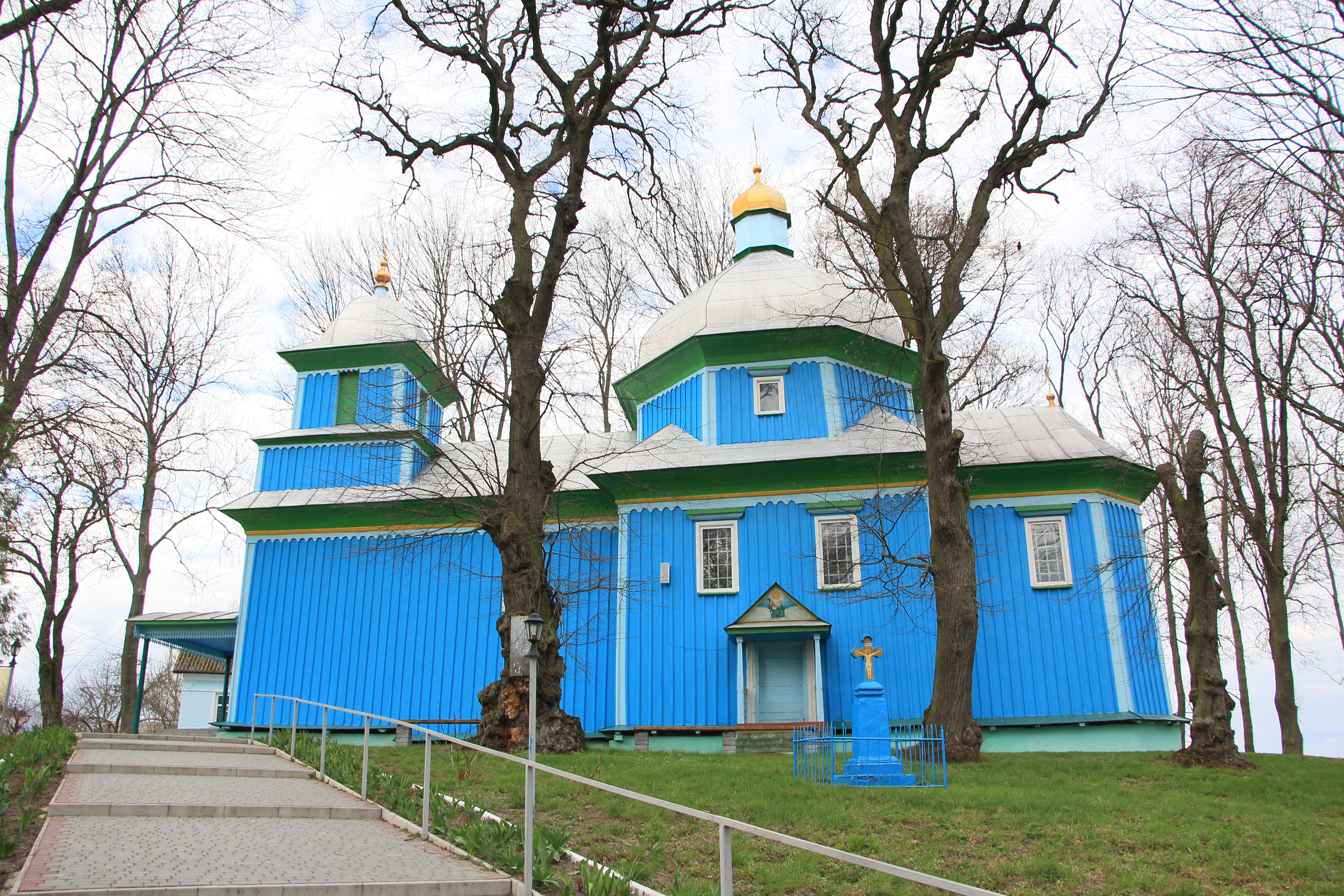
Wooden church in Rokhmaniv

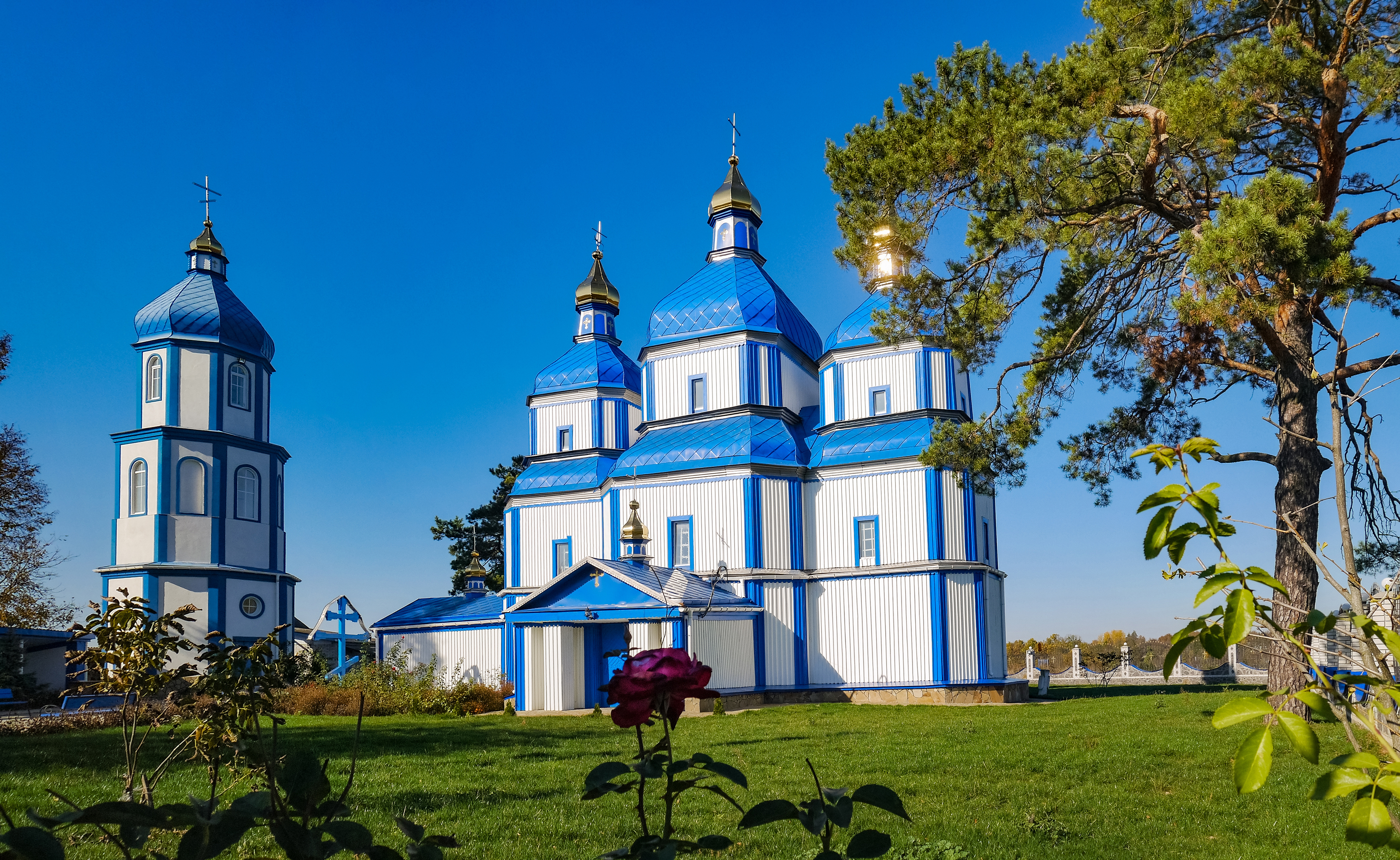
Church of the Nativity of the Theotokos, Pechera

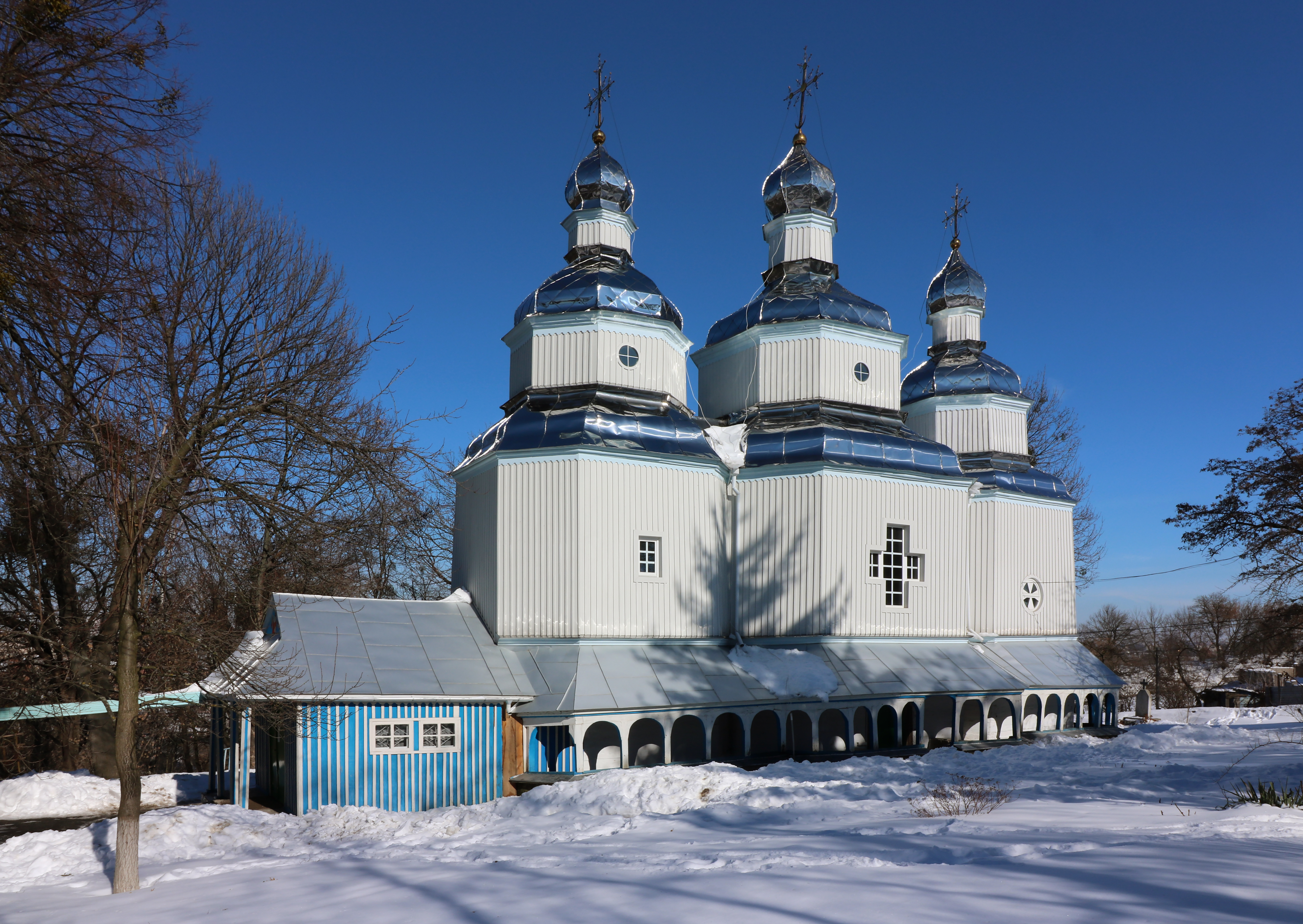
St. Nicholas wooden Orthodox church in Vinnytsia

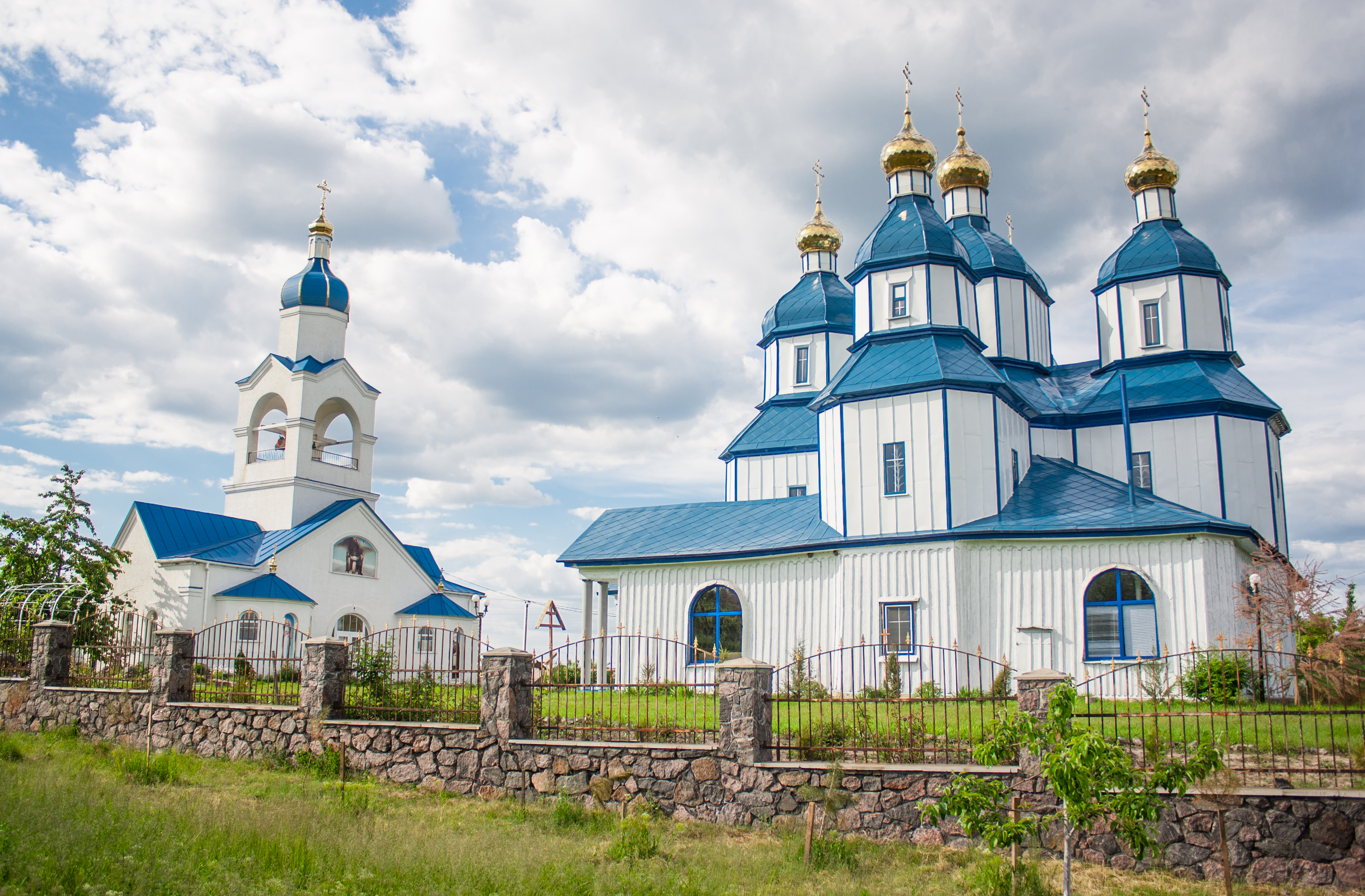
Saint Michael's Church in Dashiv

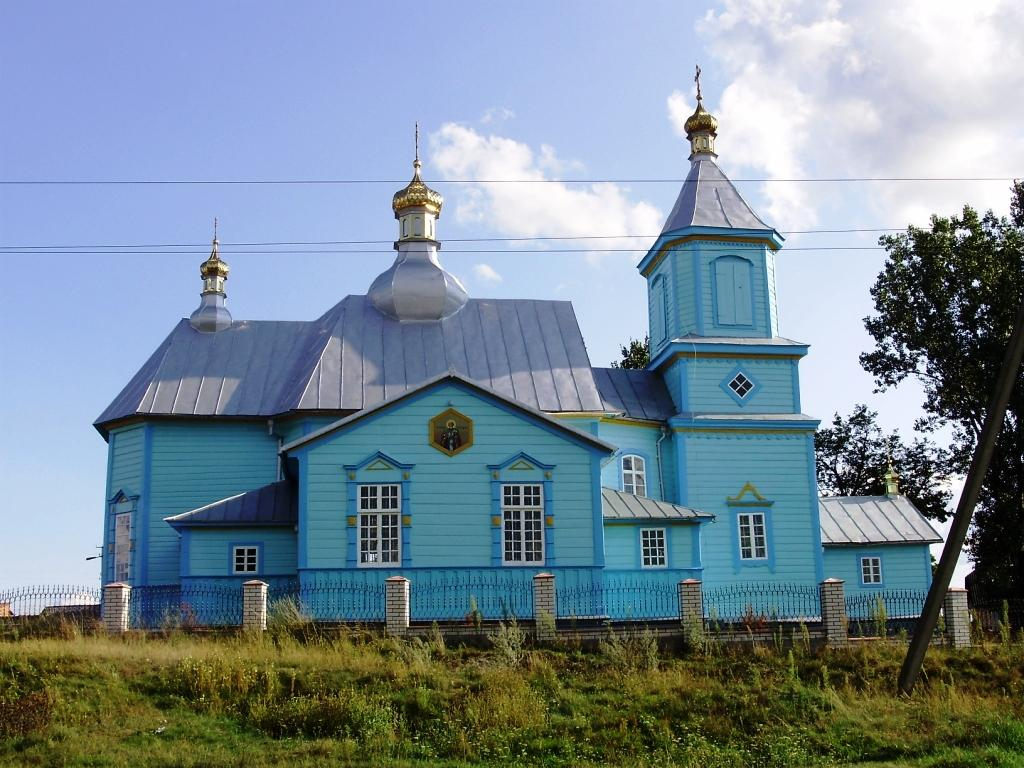
Holy Kazan Icon Church in Pishcha

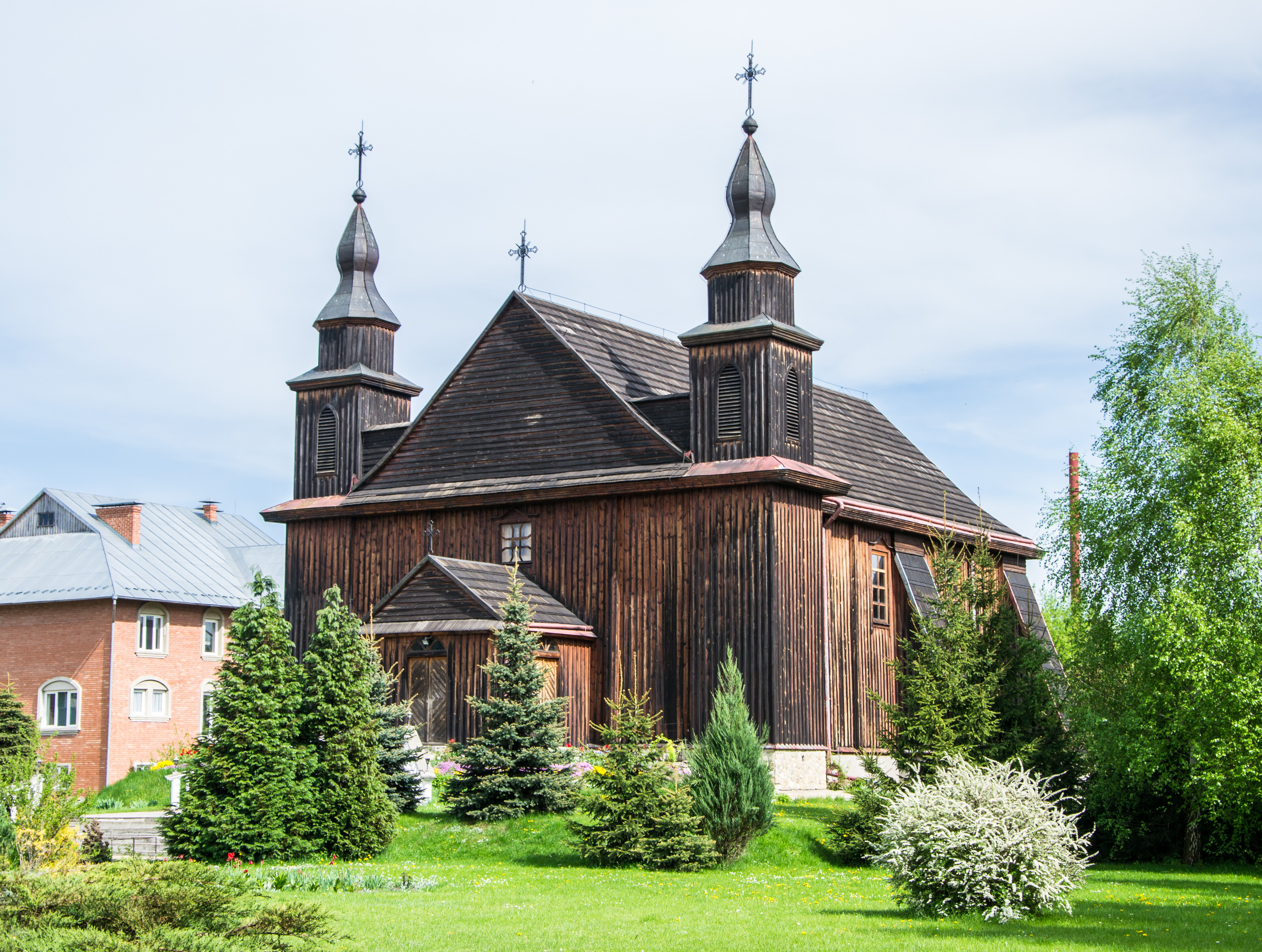
Saint Anne's Church, Kovel

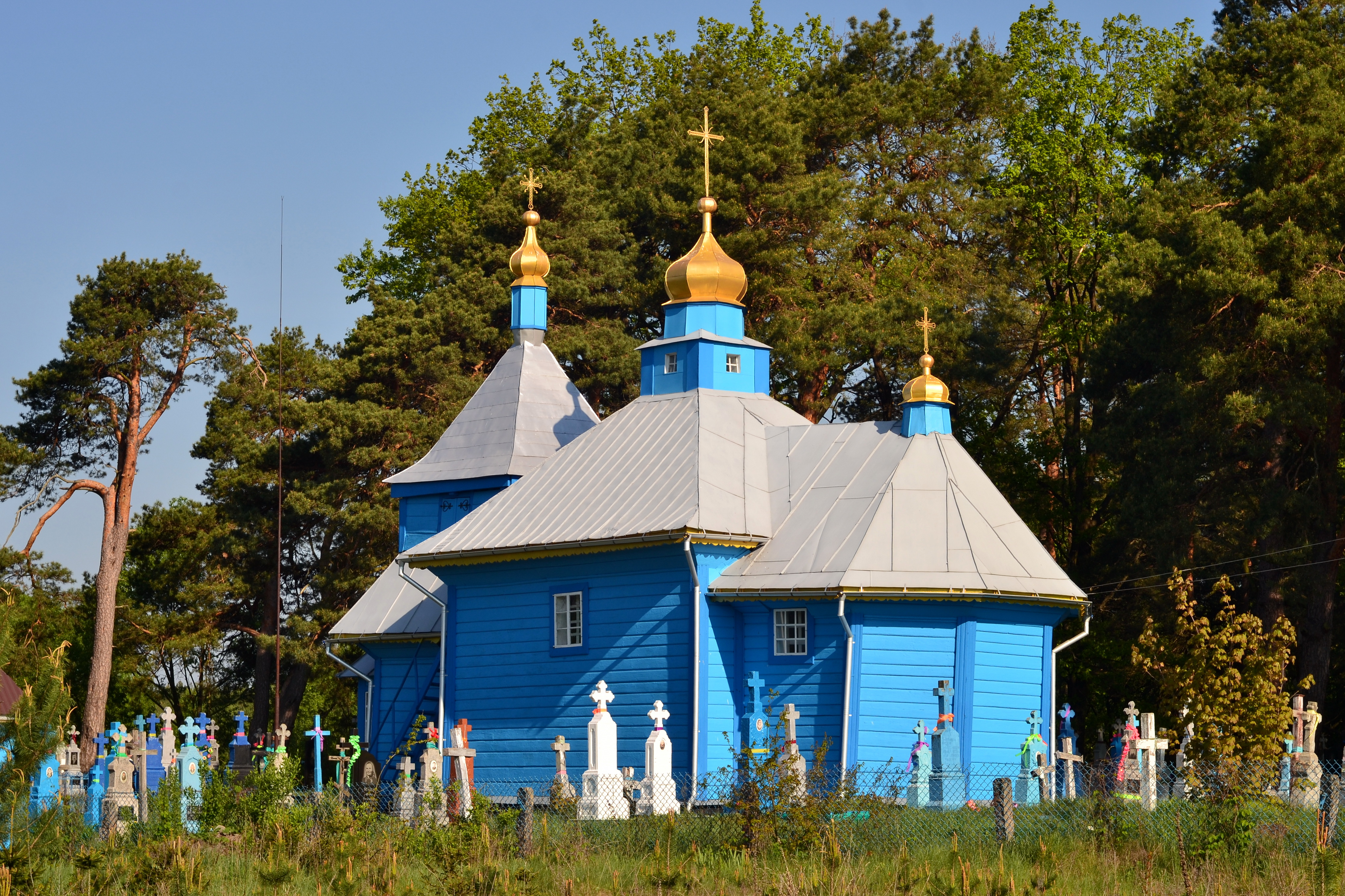
Wooden church in Hishyn

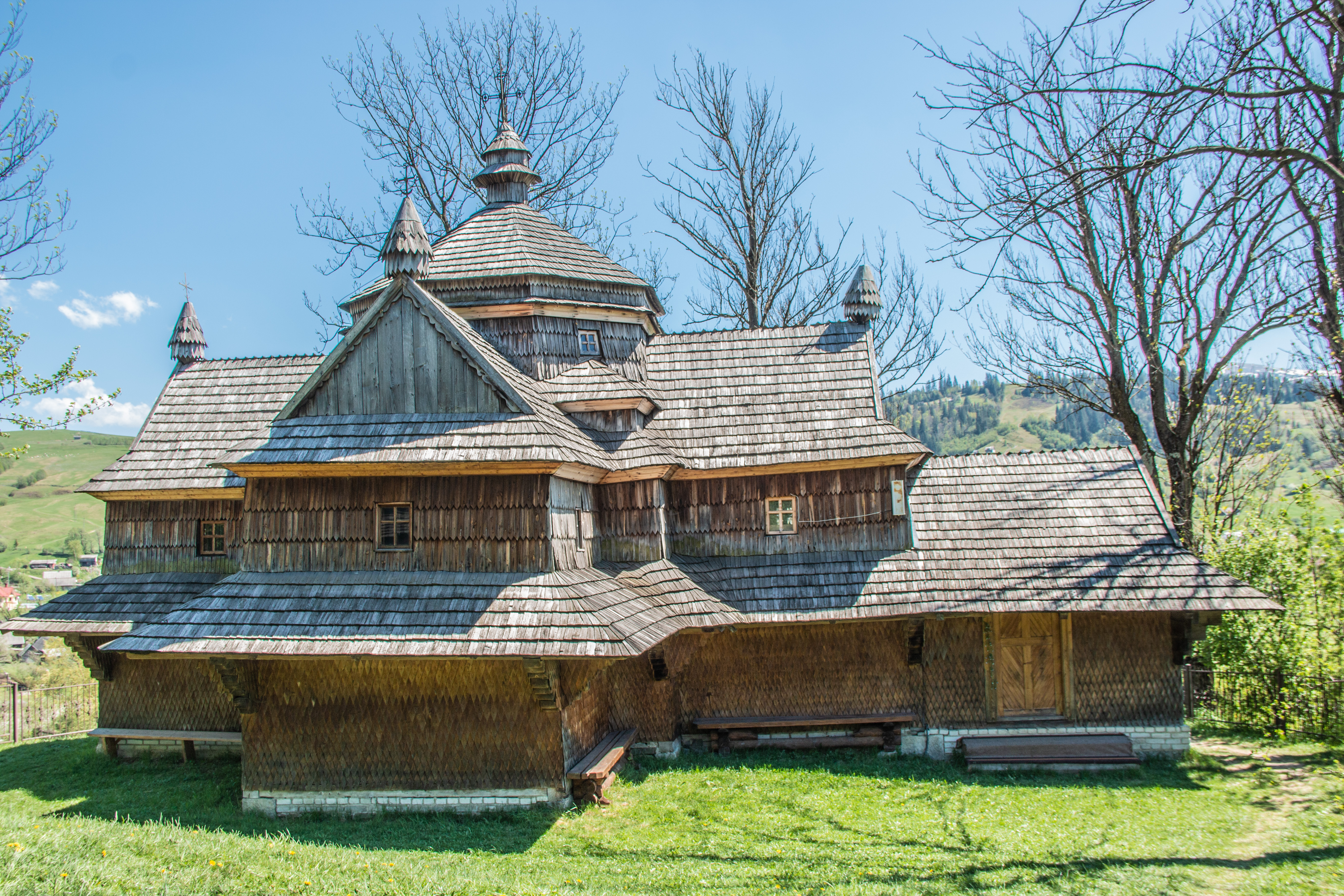
Ascension Church in Yasinia

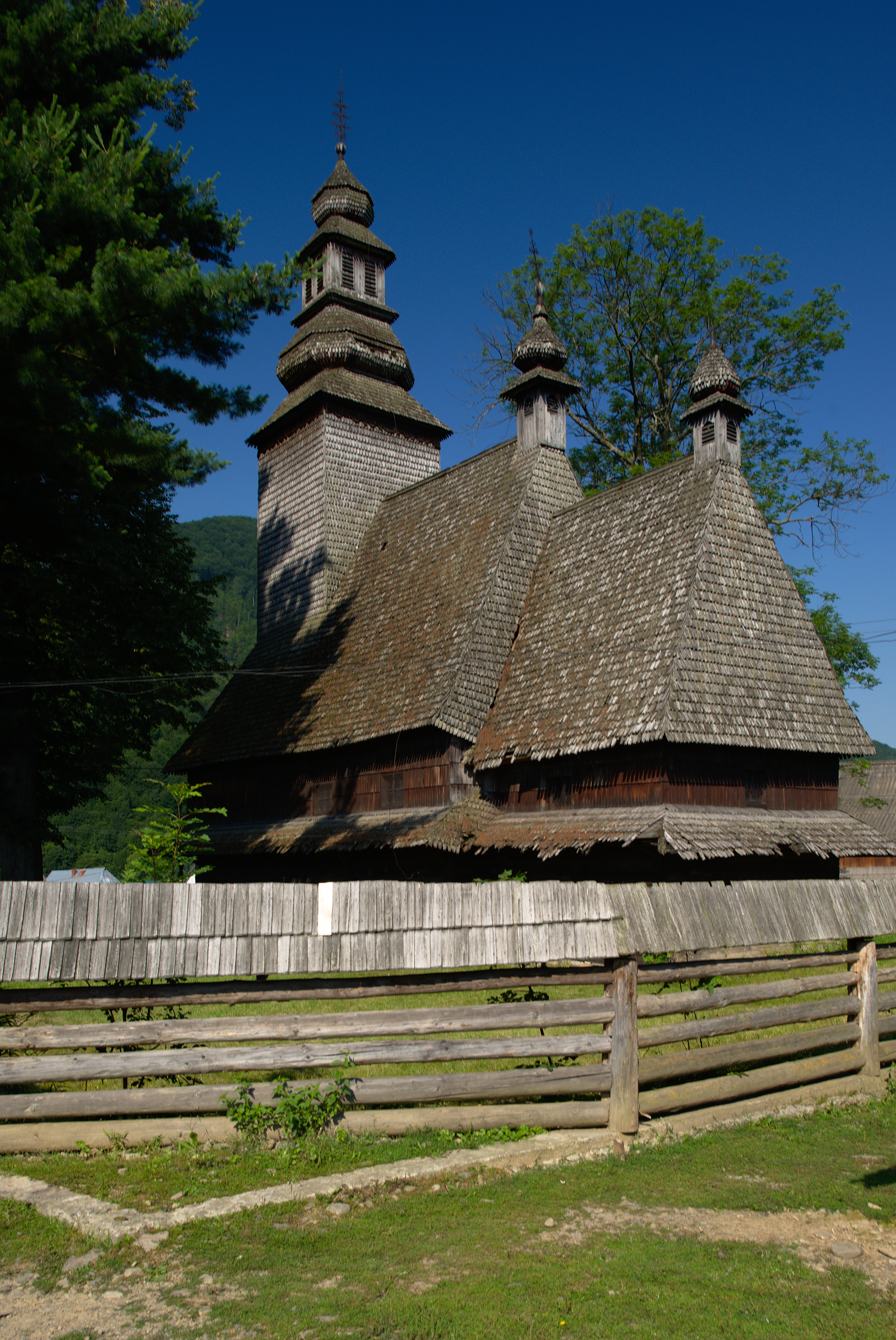
Greek Catholic Church in Kolochava

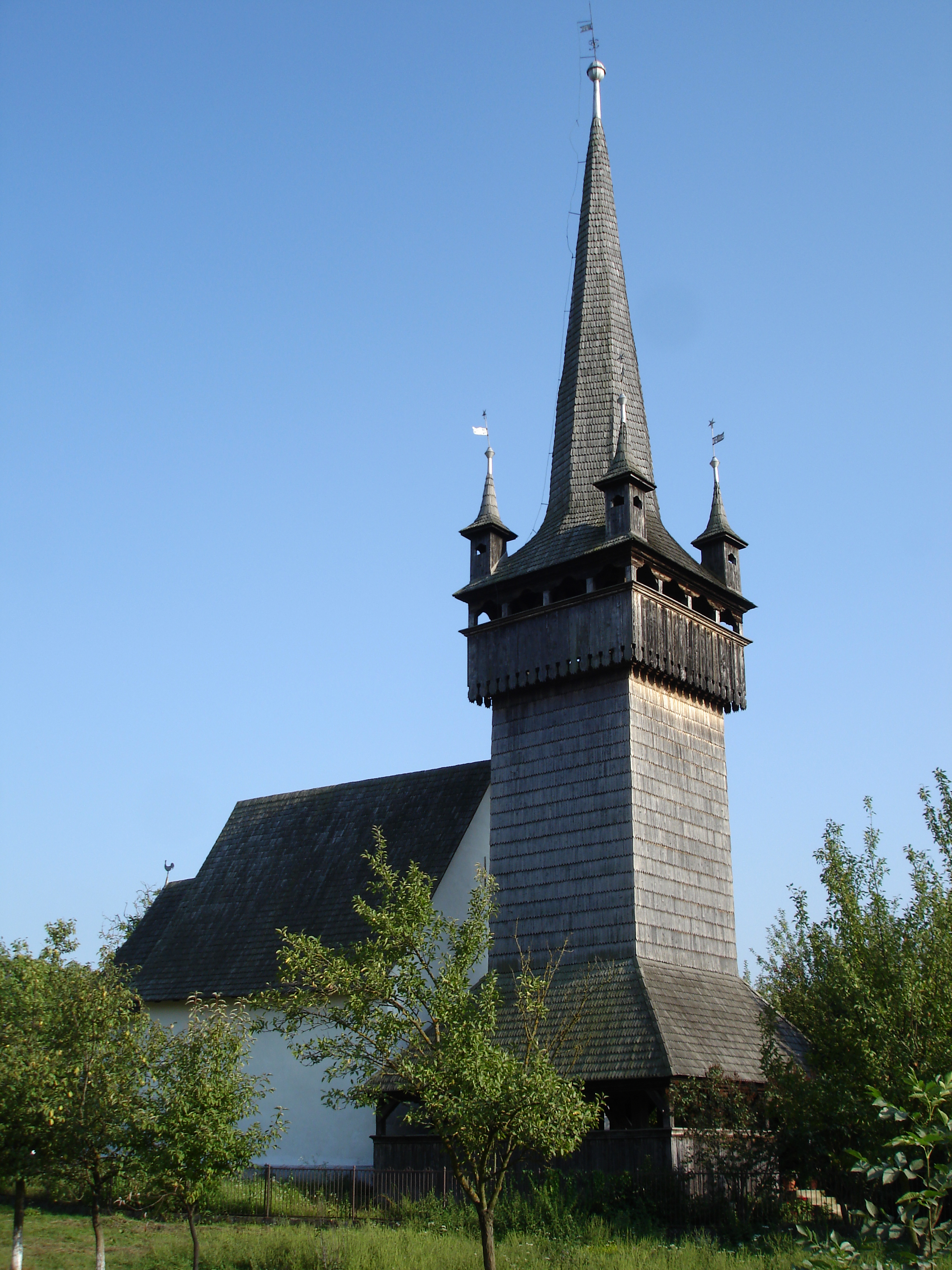
Reformed Church in Chetfalva

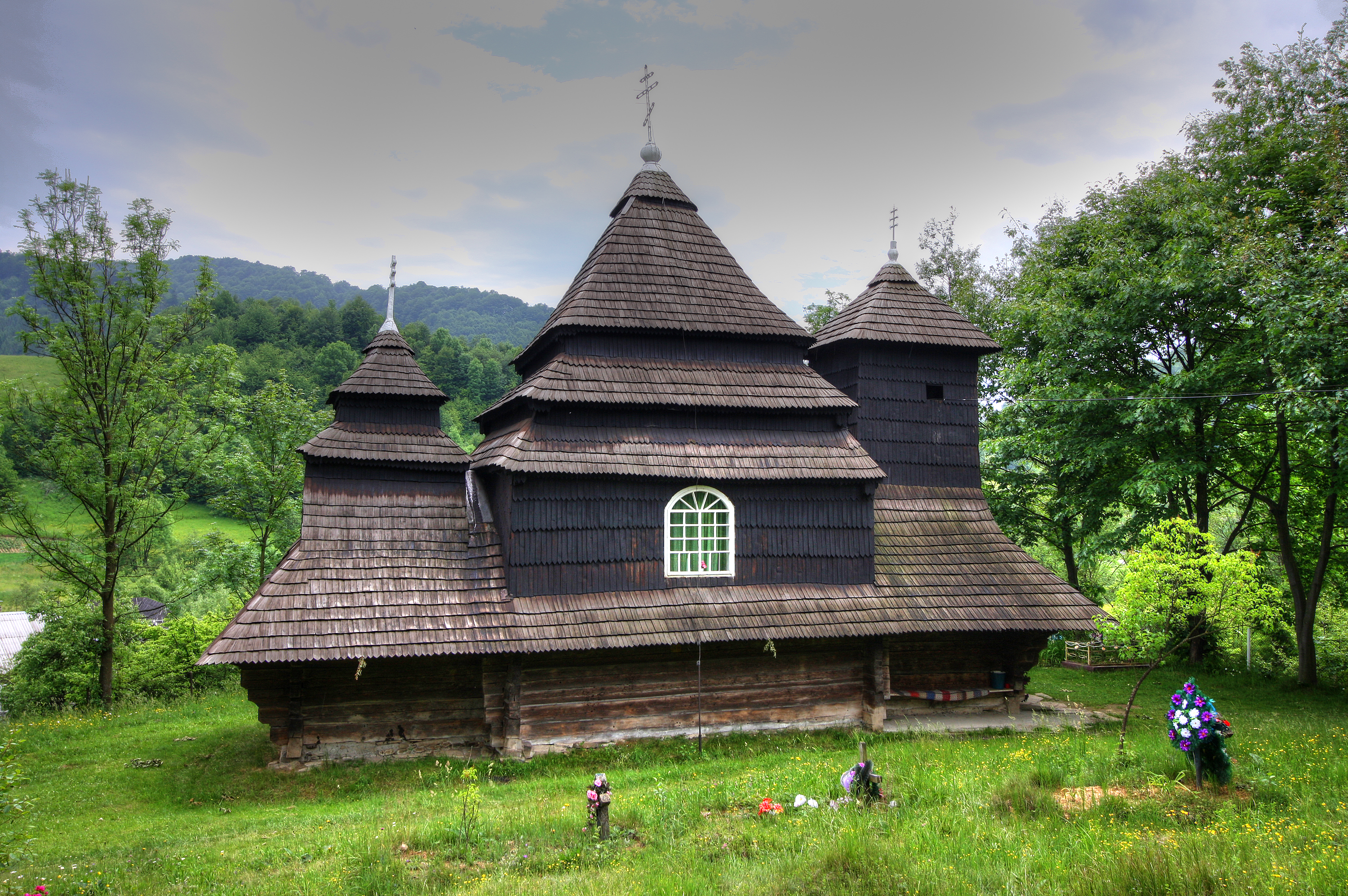
Wooden Church of St. Michael in Uzhok

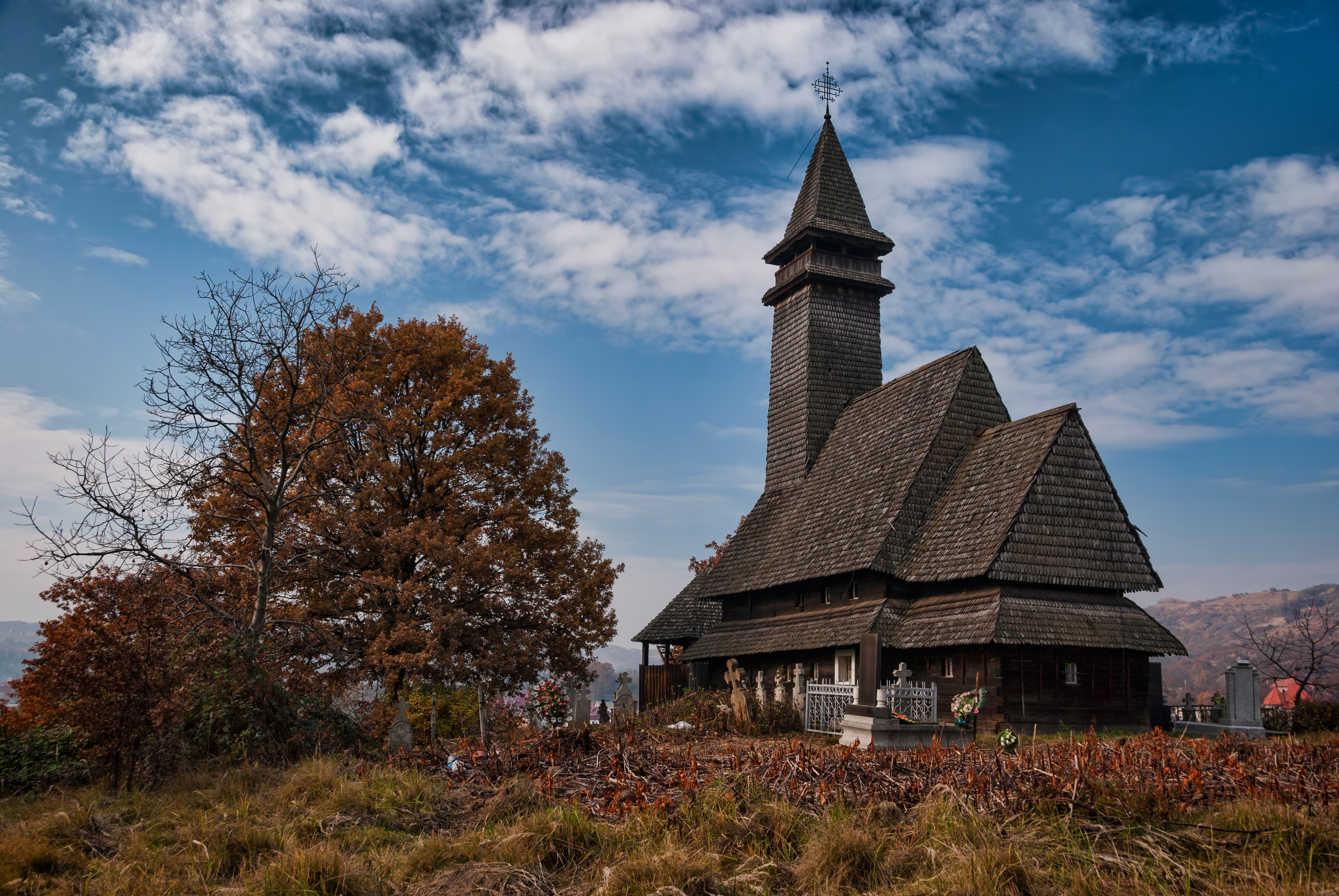
"Upper" St. Nicholas Church in Serednie Vodiane

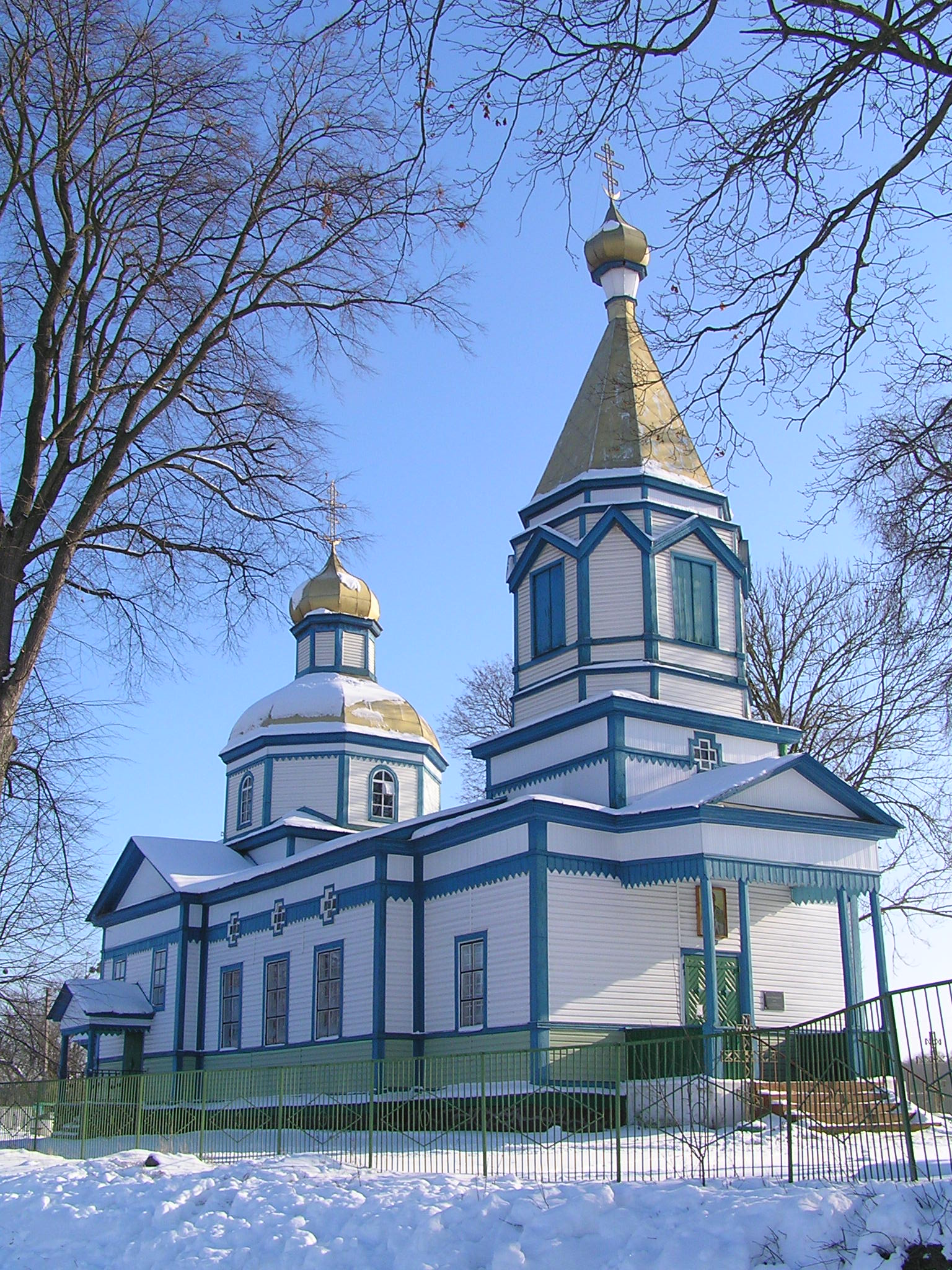
Saint Nicholas Church in Vorsivka

Churches that are part of the Wooden tserkvas of the Carpathian region World Heritage Site are marked in bold.

=== Cherkasy Oblast ===
- Assumption Church, Zhabotyn, Mykhailivka rural hromada (1851)
- Church of the Nativity of Theotokos, Verbivka, Kamianka urban hromada (1768)
- Intercession Church, Horodetske, Palanka rural hromada (1766)
- Saint Demetrius Church, Zalizniachka, Yerky settlement hromada (1773)
- Saint Michael's Church, Mykhailivka (1845)
- Saint Michael's Church, Uman (1853)
- Saint Petro Kalnyshevskyi Church, Buda, Kholodnyi Yar (2012)
- Transfiguration Church, Kornylivka, Nabutiv rural hromada (1738)
- Trinity Church, Drabivtsi, Nova Dmytrivka rural hromada (1765)
- Trinity Church, Puhachivka, Dmytrushky rural hromada (1761)

=== Chernihiv Oblast ===
- Ascension Church, Roishche Novyi Bilous rural hromada (1901)
- Ascension Church, Voznesenske, Kyselivka rural hromada (1923)
- Assumption Church, Stara Talalaivka, Talalaivka settlement hromada (19th century)
- Assumption Church, Svarychivka, Ichnia urban hromada (1709)
- Assumption Church, Voloskivtsi, Mena urban hromada (1765)
- Holy Spirit Church, Kuvechychi, Novyi Bilous rural hromada (1890s)
- Intercession Church, Diahova, Mena urban hromada (1896)
- Intercession Church, Syniavka, Mena urban hromada (1775)
- Resurrection Church, Baturyn (2008)
- Saint George's Church, Sedniv (1747)
- Saint Michael's Church, Horodyshche, Mena urban hromada (1880)
- Saint Nicholas Church, Novhorod-Siverskyi (1764)
- Transfiguration Church, Perevolochna, Sukhopolova rural hromada (early 20th century)
- Trinity Church, Novyi Bilous (1646)

=== Chernivtsi Oblast ===
- Assumption Church, Dubivtsi, Mamaivtsi rural hromada (1775)
- Assumption Church, Kalichanka, Chernivtsi (1716)
- Assumption Church, Kulivtsi (1779)
- Assumption Church, Orshivtsi, Nepolokivtsi settlement hromada (1850)
- Assumption Church, Valiava, Kitsman urban hromada (1778)
- Assumption Church, Roztoky, Ust-Putyla rural hromada (1846)
- Assumption Church, Verenchanka (1794)
- Church of Archangels Michael and Gabriel, Khlivyshche, Stavchany rural hromada (1912)
- Church of Archangels Michael and Gabriel, Tsuren (1796)
- Church of Saint John the New of Suceava, Myhove (1905)
- Church of Saint John of Suceava, Vyzhenka (1792)
- Church of Saint Paraskeva of Serbia, Miliieve (1860)
- Church of the Exaltation of Holy Cross, Pidvalne, Hertsa urban hromada (1561)
- Church of the Exaltation of Holy Cross, Verkhni Synivtsi (1790)
- Church of the Nativity of Theotokos, Halytsivka, Seliatyn rural hromada (1630)
- Church of the Nativity of the Theotokos, Ivankivtsi, Kitsman urban hromada (1794)
- Church of the Nativity of Theotokos, Shyshkivtsi, Stavchany rural hromada (1886)
- Saint Basil's Church, Koniatyn (1877)
- Saint Constantine's Church, Oshykhliby, Kitsman urban hromada (1779)
- Saint Demetrius Church, Bukivka (18th century)
- Saint Demetrius Church, Lukovytsia, Chahor rural hromada (1757)
- Saint Demetrius Old Believer Church, Bilousivka, Sokyriany urban hromada (1819)
- Saint Elijah's Church, Shepit (1898)
- Saint John's Church, Mamaivtsi (1863)
- Saint Michael's Church, Petrashivka (1663)
- Saint Michael's Church, Stara Zhadova (1806)
- Saint Nicholas Church, Berehomet (1786)
- Saint Nicholas Church, Chernivtsi (1607)
- Saint Nicholas Church, Nyzhni Stanivtsi, Brusnytsia rural hromada (1794)
- Saint Nicholas Church, Poliana, Tarashany rural hromada (1618)
- Saint Nicholas Church, Putyla (1885)
- Saint Paraskeva's Church, Ust-Putyla (1881)

=== Dnipropetrovsk Oblast ===
- Trinity Cathedral, Samar (1781) - only surviving nine-domed church in Ukraine

=== Donetsk Oblast ===
- All Saints' Skete, Tetianivka, Sviatohirsk Lavra (2004) - destroyed during the Russian invasion of Ukraine in 2022
- Saint Nicholas Church, Bakhmut (1797) - destroyed during the Russian invasion of Ukraine in 2023

=== Ivano-Frankivsk Oblast ===
- Annunciation Church, Kolomyia (1709)
- Annunciation Church, Verbovets, Kosiv urban hromada (1850)
- Ascension Church, Babyn, Kosiv urban hromada (1894)
- Acension Church, Brustury, Kosmach rural hromada (1785)
- Ascension Church, Sniatyn (1794)
- Ascension Church, Usteriky, Biloberizka rural hromada (1930)
- Assumption Church, Hvizd (1739)
- Assumption Church, Khlibychyn, Zabolotiv settlement hromada (1854)
- Assumption Church, Pistyn, Kosiv urban hromada (1600)
- Candlemas Church, Kalush (1898)
- Church of Saints Joachim and Anne, Smodna, Kosiv urban hromada (1819)
- Church of Saint John the Baptist, Cherhanivka, Kosiv urban hromada (1842)
- Church of Saint John the Baptist, Nazavyziv (1820)
- Church of Saint John the Baptist, Zelene (1869)
- Church of Saint John the Merciful, Yaremche (17-18th century)
- Church of the Entry into Jerusalem, Staryi Uhryniv (1924)
- Church of the Exaltation of Holy Cross, Mykytyntsi, Kosiv urban hromada (1859)
- Church of the Exaltation of Holy Cross, Vyspa, Rohatyn urban hromada (1732)
- Church of the Exaltation of Holy Cross, Zahiria, Rohatyn urban hromada (17-18th century)
- Church of the Holy Spirit, Sokolivka (1866)
- Church of the Immaculate Conception, Bili Oslavy (1746)
- Church of the Nativity of the Theotokos, Deliatyn (1785)
- Church of the Nativity of the Theotokos, Kalush (1792)
- Church of the Nativity of the Theotokos, Kryvorivnia (1660s)
- **Church of the Nativity of the Theotokos, Nyzhnii Verbizh (1788)**
- Church of the Nativity of the Theotokos, Torhovytsia (1924)
- Church of the Nativity of the Theotokos, Tysmenytsia (1736)
- Church of the Nativity of the Theotokos, Vorokhta (17-18th century)
- **Holy Spirit Church, Rohatyn (1598)**
- Intercession Church, Biloberizka (1851)
- Nativity Church, Pidhiria, Bohorodchany settlement hromada (1832)
- Resurrection Church, Yahlush, Rohatyn urban hromada (1912)
- Resurrection Church, Zhukotyn, Korshiv rural hromada (1845)
- Saint Anne's Church, Bystrets, Zelene rural hromada (1872)
- Saint Basil's Church, Cherche (1733)
- Saint Basil's Church, Kosiv (1989, rebuilt in 2011)
- Saint Basil's Church, Richka, Kosiv urban hromada (1896)
- Saint Demetrius Church, Bili Oslavy (1835)
- Saint Demetrius Church, Tatariv, Vorokhta settlement hromada (1870)
- Saint George's Church, Bystrytsia, Polianytsia rural hromada (1924)
- Saint George's Church, Ostrivets, Horodenka urban hromada (1859)
- Saint Elijah's Church, Yaremche (1938, rebuilt in 2015)
- Saint Michael's Church, Budyliv, Sniatyn urban hromada (1864)
- Saint Michael's Church, Cheremoshna, Biloberizka rural hromada (1927)
- Saint Michael's Church, Dibrova, Burshtyn urban hromada (1894)
- Saint Michael's Church, Dora, Yaremche (1844)
- Saint Michael's Church, Dovhopole (1872)
- Saint Michael's Church, Lyuchky, Yabluniv settlement hromada (1820)
- Saint Michael's Church, Verkhnii Verbizh, Nyzhnii Verbizh rural hromada (1861)
- Saint Nicholas Church, Kalush (1888)
- Saint Nicholas Church, Slyvky, Perehinske settlement hromada (1760)
- Saint Nicholas Church, Ustia, Sniatyn urban hromada (1853)
- Saint Paraskeva's Church, Sheshory (1875)
- Saint Paraskeva's Church, Velykyi Kliuchiv (1864)
- Saint Peter and Paul's Church, Kosmach (1905)
- Saint Peter and Paul's Church, Krasnoillia, Verkhovyna settlement hromada (1840)
- Saint Stephen's Church, Horod, Kosiv urban hromada (1868)
- Transfiguration Church, Rozhniv (1833)
- Transfiguration Church, Stari Kuty, Kuty settlement hromada (1868)
- Trinity Church, Iltsi (1881)
- Trinity Church, Mykulychyn (1866)
- Trinity Church, Verkhnii Yaseniv, Verkhovyna settlement hromada (1882)
- Trinity Church, Yavoriv, Kosiv urban hromada (1926)

=== Kharkiv Oblast ===
- Church of Saint John the Evangelist, Kurylivka (17-18th century, destroyed during the Russian invasion of Ukraine in 2022

=== Kherson Oblast ===
- Holy Presentation Church, Beryslav (1725, transferred in 1782 from Perevolochna)

=== Khmelnytskyi Oblast ===
- Church of the Exaltation of the Holy Cross, Kamianets-Podilskyi (1801)
- Saint Demetrius Church, Staryi Kryvyn, Netishyn urban hromada (1763)
- Saint Demetrius Church, Zaluchchia, Chemerivtsi rural hromada (1738)
- Saint Michael's Church, Velyka Radohoshch, Pluzhne rural hromada (18th century)
- Saint Michael's Church, Zapadyntsi, Medzhybizh rural hromada (1733)
- Saint Michael's Church, Zinkiv (1769)

=== Kyiv and Kyiv Oblast ===
- Church of Saint John the Baptist, Rozkopantsi, Bohuslav urban hromada (1726)
- Church of Saint Seraphim of Sarov, Pushcha-Vodytsia, Kyiv (1910) - wooden with brick elements
- Church of the Ascension, Lukianivka (1879, destroyed during the Russian invasion of Ukraine in 2022)
- Church of the Nativity of Theotokos, Antonivka, Stavyshche settlement hromada (1777)
- Church of the Nativity of Theotokos, Peremoha, Baryshivka settlement hromada (1892)
- Church of the Nativity of Theotokos, Vasylkiv (1859)
- Holy Spirit Church, Shkarivka, Bila Tserkva urban hromada (1750)
- Intercession Church, Fastiv (1781)
- Intercession Church, Kozhanka (1758)
- Intercession Church, Krenychi, Kozyn settlement hromada (1761)
- Intercession Church, Pereyaslav (1774, transferred from the village of Sukhyi Yar in Bila Tserkva Raion)
- Intercession Church, Pyrohiv, Kyiv (1792, transferred from Transcarpathia)
- Saint Demetrius Church, Zhuliany, Kyiv (1862)
- Saint George's Church, Zavorychi (1873, destroyed during the Russian invasion of Ukraine in 2022)
- Saint Joseph's Church, Zhytni Hory, Rokytne settlement hromada (1766)
- Saint Makarios Church, Tatarka, Kyiv (1897)
- Saint Michael's Church, Boyarka (1901) - wooden with brick elements
- Saint Michael's Church, Kozhukhivka, Kalynivka settlement hromada (1820)
- Saint Michael's Church, Krasne near Chornobyl (1905, abandoned)
- Saint Michael's Church, Lukashi, Baryshivka settlement hromada (1896)
- Saint Michael's Church, Ostriv, Rokytne settlement hromada (1740)
- Saint Michael's Church, Pidhirtsi, Kozyn settlement hromada (1742)
- Saint Michael's Church, Rosishky, Tetiiv urban hromada (1905)
- Saint Nicholas Church, Pyrohiv, Kyiv (1763, transferred from Horodyshche, Chernihiv Oblast)
- Saint Nicholas Church, Syniava, Rokytne settlement hromada (1730)
- Saint Onuphrius Church, Lypovyi Skytok, Kalynivka settlement hromada (1706) - oldest fully preserved wooden church in Kyiv region
- Saint Paraskeva's Church, Pyrohiv, Kyiv (1742, transferred from the village of Zarubyntsi, now in Monastyryshche urban hromada, Cherkasy Oblast
- Saint Paraskeva's Church, Oliinykova Sloboda, Uzyn urban hromada (1910)
- Saint Paraskeva's Church, Vepryk (1856, restored in 1997)
- Saint Paraskeva's Church, Pereyaslav (1891, transported from a nearby village)
- Transfiguration Church, Sukholisy, Uzyn urban hromada (1726)
- Trinity Church, Busheve, Rokytne settlement hromada (1760)

=== Lviv Oblast ===
- Annunciation Church, Hrebeniv (1928)
- Assumption Church, Besidy, Zhovkva urban hromada (1835)
- Assumption Church, Klitsko, Komarno urban hromada (1603)
- Assumption Church, Lelekhivka, Ivano-Frankove settlement hromada (1739)
- Assumption Church, Pisochna (1893)
- Assumotion Church, Sheptychi, Rudky urban hromada (1892)
- Assumption Church, Topilnytsia, Strilky rural hromada (1730)
- Assumption Church, Turka (1750)
- Assumption Church, Verkhobuzh (1730)
- Candlemas Church, Cherepyn, Davydiv rural hromada (1757)
- Church of Saint Basil the Great, Bartativ (1889)
- Church of Saint Basil the Great, Mezhyrichchya (1887)
- Church of Saint Elijah the Prophet, Krasne (1750)
- Church of Saint Elijah the Prophet, Monastyr-Lishnianskyi, Drohobych urban hromada (1698)
- Church of Saint Elijah the Prophet, Zashkovychi (1838)
- Church of Saint John the Baptist, Horodok (1754)
- Church of Saint John the Baptist, Limna (1882)
- Church of Saint John the Baptist, Stare Selo (1742)
- Church of Saint John the Baptist, Pryslip, Turka urban hromada (1895)
- Church of Saint John the Evangelist, Bolozhyniv, Busk urban hromada (17th century)
- Church of Saint John the Evangelist, Klekotiv (1686)
- Church of Saint Luke, Korsiv (1743)
- Church of Saint Cosmas and Damian, Korchyn (1824)
- Church of Saints Cosmas and Damian, Volia Yakubova, Drohobych urban hromada (1827)
- Church of Saints Cosmas and Damian, Vyshnia (1805)
- Church of the Ascension, Shnyriv (1767)
- Church of the Exaltation of the Holy Cross, Drohobych (1613)
- **Church of the Holy Mother of God, Matkiv (1838)**
- Church of the Holy Mother of God, Podorozhnye, Zhuravne settlement hromada (1848)
- Church of the Holy Mother of God, Prylbychi (1654)
- Church of the Holy Mother of God, Pykulovychi (1794)
- Church of the Holy Mother of God, Rokytne, Ivano-Frankove settlement hromada (1864)
- Church of the Holy Mother of God, Selets (1700)
- Church of the Holy Mother of God, Styborivka (1702)
- Church of the Holy Mother of God, Zabolottsi (1746)
- Church of the Holy Spirit, Horodyshche, Ralivka rural hromada (late 19th century)
- Church of the Holy Spirit, Vykoty, Biskovychi rural hromada (1671)
- Church of the Nativity of the Theotokos, Novosilky-Hostynni, Rudky urban hromada (1700)
- Church of the Nativity of the Theotokos, Rozluch, Turka urban hromada (1876)
- Church of the Nativity of the Theotokos, Verbliany (1865)
- Church of the Nativity of the Theotokos, Yavoriv (1670)
- Church of the Nativity of the Theotokos, Zaraiske, Novyi Kalyniv urban hromada (1634)
- Church of the Nativity of the Theotokos, Zhovkva (1705)
- Church of the Presentation of Virgin Mary, Teliazh, Sokal urban hromada (1883)
- Church of the Presentation of Virgin Mary, Vovche, Turka urban hromada (1680)
- Church of the Presentation of Virgin Mary, Vovkiv (1702)
- Church of the Presentation of Virgin Mary, Zavereshytsia (1693)
- Church of the Translation of the Relics of Saint Nicholas, Nahuievychi (1801)
- Church of the Translation of the Relics of Saint Nicholas, Turka (1776)
- Epiphany Church, Kuhaiv, Solonka rural hromada (1693)
- Epiphany Church, Oriavchyk (1862)
- **Holy Spirit Church, Potelych (1502)** - oldest three-section wooden church in Ukraine
- Holy Spirit Church, Verkhnia Rozhanka (1804)
- Holy Trinity Church, Brody (1744)
- Holy Trinity Church, Nyzhankovychi (15th century)
- Holy Trinity Church, Malyi Liubin, Velykyi Liubin settlement hromada (1705)
- Holy Trinity Church, Stankiv, Morshyn urban hromada (1850)
- Holy Trinity Church, Sykhiv, Lviv (1654)
- **Holy Trinity Church, Zhovkva (1720)**
- Intercession Church, Drohobych (2013)
- Intercession Church, Hirne (1862)
- Intercession Church, Lukavets (1740)
- Intercession Church, Svydnyk, Skhidnytsia settlement hromada(1906)
- Resurrection Church, Poliany (1903)
- Resurrection Church, Vizhomlia, Yavoriv urban hromada (1560)
- Resurrection Church, Zhuzheliany, Belz urban hromada (1870)
- Saint Demetrius Church, Matkiv (1838)
- Saint Demetrius Church, Orykhivchyk (1775)
- Saint Demetrius Church, Yablunivka, Busk urban hromada (1867)
- Saint Eustachius Church, Oblaznytsia (17th century)
- Saint Eustachius Church, Strilky (1792)
- Saint Francis Borgia Catholic Church, Rozluch, Turka urban hromada (1902)
- **Saint George's Church, Drohobych (1656)**
- Saint George's Church, Duliby (1923)
- Saint George's Church, Litovyshche (1784)
- Saint George's Church, Nakvasha (1795)
- Saint George's Church, Novoiavorivsk (1715)
- Saint Michael's Church, Boberka (1914)
- Saint Michael's Church, Ditkivtsi (1869)
- Saint Michael's Church, Isai (1663)
- Saint Michael's Church, Karpatske (1772)
- Saint Michael's Church, Kizliv, Busk urban hromada (1866)
- Saint Michael's Church, Komarno (1754)
- Saint Michael's Church, Kuty (1697)
- Saint Michael's Church, Lahodiv (1732)
- Saint Michael's Church, Muzhylovychi, Novoiavorivsk urban hromada (1600)
- Saint Michael's Church, Shevchenkivskyi Hai museum, Lviv (1863)
- Saint Michael's Church, Stanislavchyk (1799)
- Saint Michael's Church, Stara Skvariava (1508)
- Saint Michael's Church, Volia-Vysotska, Zhovkva urban hromada (1598)
- Saint Nicetas Church, Derniv, Kamianka-Buzka urban hromada (1666)
- Saint Nicholas Church, Dubanevychi (1880)
- Saint Nicholas Church, Kamianka-Buzka (1667)
- Saint Nicholas Church, Medvezha, Drohobych urban hromada (1872)
- Saint Nicholas Church, Pidluby, Novoiavorivsk urban hromada (1830)
- Saint Nicholas Church, Shevchenkivskyi Hai museum, Lviv (1795)
- Saint Nicholas Church, Strilkiv, Stryi urban hromada (1650)
- Saint Nicholas Church, Turka (1739)
- Saint Nicholas Church, Velykyi Liubin (1854)
- Saint Nicholas Church, Yasnyska, Ivano-Frankove settlement hromada (1900)
- Saint Nicholas Church, Zvenyhorod (1891)
- Saint Onuphrius Church, Busk (1680)
- Saint Pantaleon's Church, Zhukotyn, Turka urban hromada (1942)
- Saint Paraskeva's Church, Belz (18-19th century)
- Saint Paraskeva's Church, Buniv, Yavoriv urban hromada (1676)
- Saint Paraskeva's Church, Busk (1708)
- Saint Paraskeva's Church, Drohobych (1815)
- Saint Paraskeva's Church, Krekhiv (1724)
- Saint Paraskeva's Church, Medenychi (1644)
- Saint Paraskeva's Church, Nyzhni Hai, Drohobych urban hromada (1882)
- Saint Paraskeva's Church, Shevchenkivskyi Hai museum, Lviv (1822)
- Saint Paraskeva's Church, Skole (17th century)
- Saint Peter and Paul's Church, Velyka Khvoroshcha, Novyi Kalyniv urban hromada (1662)
- Transfiguration Church, Hrimne, Komarno urban hromada (1777)

=== Odesa Oblast ===
- Saint Luke and Saint Michael's Church, Odesa (2010)

=== Poltava Oblast ===
- Assumption Church, Pisky, Lubny urban hromada (1914)
- Assumption Church, Vechirky, Pyriatyn urban hromada (18th century)
- Church of All Saints, Staryi Irzhavets, Orzhytsia settlement hromada (1802)
- Church of Saint John the Baptist, Dmytrivka, Mashivka settlement hromada (1892)
- Church of Saint John the Baptist, Dudkyn Hai, Drabynivka rural hromada (1901)
- Church of Saint John the Baptist, Myrhorod (1913)
- Church of the Nativity of Theotokos, Kharkivtsi, Hadiach urban hromada (1889)
- Church of the Nativity of Theotokos, Mali Budyshcha, Opishnia settlement hromada (1892)
- Church of the Nativity of Theotokos, Voronky, Chornukhy settlement hromada (1857)
- Intercession Church, Berezotocha, Lubny urban hromada (1886)
- Intercession Church, Maltsi, Myrhorod urban hromada (18th century)
- Intercession Church, Sary, Hadiach urban hromada (1895)
- Saint Elijah's Church, Perehonivka, Kobeliaky urban hromada (1907)
- Saint Michael's Church, Povstyn, Pyriatyn urban hromada (1775)
- Saint Nicholas Church, Nyzhnia Budakivka, Zavodske urban hromada
- Trinity Church, Velbivka, Velyki Budyshcha rural hromada (1866)

=== Rivne Oblast ===
- Ascension Church, Buhryn (1876)
- Assumption Church, Rivne (1756)
- Assumption Church, Verben, Demydivka settlement hromada (1877)
- Church of Saint John the Evangelist, Balashivka, Berezne urban hromada (1755)
- Church of Saint John the Evangelist, Syniv, Hoshcha settlement hromada (1595)
- Church of Saint Luke the Evangelist, Bilohorodka, Verba rural hromada (1914)
- Church of the Exaltation of the Holy Cross, Bohdashiv, Zdolbuniv urban hromada (18th century)
- Church of the Exaltation of the Holy Cross, Kniahynyn, Myrohoshcha rural hromada (1737)
- Church of the Nativity of the Theotokos, Drukhiv, Berezne urban hromada (1793)
- Church of the Nativity of the Theotokos, Korytne, Krupets rural hromada (18th century)
- Church of the Nativity of the Theotokos, Remchytsi, Sarny urban hromada (1767)
- Church of the Nativity of the Theotokos, Smorodsk, Myliach rural hromada (1905)
- Church of the Nativity of the Theotokos, Yaroslavychi (1882)
- Intercession Church, Bronnyky, Horodok rural hromada (1928)
- Intercession Church, Hrushvytsia Persha (1766)
- Intercession Church, Khotyn, Krupets rural hromada (1880)
- Intercession Church, Mytnytsia, Krupets rural hromada (18th century)
- Intercession Church, Obariv, Horodok rural hromada (1781)
- Intercession Church, Svitanok, Velyki Mezhyrichi rural hromada (18th century)
- Intercession Church, Velykyi Stydyn, Kostopil urban hromada (1768)
- Intercession Church, Zolotiiv, Rivne (1855)
- Saint Demetrius Church, Bilche, Boremel rural hromada (1701)
- Saint Demetrius Church, Sernyky, Zarichne settlement hromada (1722)
- Saint George's Church, Boremel (1774)
- Saint George's Church, Dubno (1700)
- Saint George's Church, Hrabiv, Zoria rural hromada (1755)
- Saint George's Church, Siyantsi, Ostroh urban hromada (1743)
- Saint Michael's Church, Pliasheva, Demydivka settlement hromada (1630)
- Saint Michael's Church, Sribne, Krupets rural hromada (1865)
- Saint Michael's Church, Storozhiv, Korets urban hromada (1882)
- Saint Nicholas Church, Dubrovytsia (1872)
- Saint Nicholas Church, Horodets, Sarny urban hromada (1834)
- Saint Nicholas Church, Kornyn (18th century)
- Saint Nicholas Church, Ostroh (2018)
- Saint Nicholas Church, Stavok, Holovyn rural hromada (1928)
- Saint Paraskeva's Church, Diadkovychi (1912)
- Saint Paraskeva's Church, Soloniv, Demydivka settlement hromada (18th century)
- Saint Peter and Saint Paul's Church, Velyki Mezhyrichi (1848)
- Transfiguration Church, Marynyn (1801)
- Transfiguration Church, Orzhiv (1770)
- Transfiguration Church, Tuchyn (1730)
- Trinity Church, Khorupan, Bokiima rural hromada (1743)
- Trinity Church, Mykhalkivtsi, Ostroh urban hromada (1740)
- Trinity Church, Stepan (1770)

=== Sumy Oblast ===
- Assumption Church, Pavlenkove, Lebedyn urban hromada (1875)
- Church of Saint John the Evangelist, Plavynyshche, Romny urban hromada (1776)
- Church of the Nativity of Theotokos, Deptivka, Popivka riral hromada (1906)
- Intercession Church, Malyi Sambir, Popivka rural hromada (1886)
- Intercession Church, Pyrohivka, Shostka urban hromada (1777)
- Nativity Church, Ripky, Romny urban hromada (1764)
- Resurrection Church, Lebedyn (1789)
- Trinity Church, Pustoviitivka, Romny urban hromada (1773, rebuilt in 2006)

=== Ternopil Oblast ===
- Church of John the Baptist, Kokutkivtsi (1883)
- Church of John The Baptist, Zelena (1652)
- Church of John the Evangelist, Skoryky (1744)
- Church of Saint Paraskeva, Mukhavka (1860)
- Church of Saint Paraskeva, Poruchyn (14th century)
- Church of Saint Paraskeva, Rozhadiv (1911)
- Church of the Ascension in Chortkiv (1630)
- Church of the Ascension, Kurivtsi (17th-early 18th century)
- Church of the Ascension, Neterpyntsi (1877)
- Church of the Assumption, Cherkavshchyna (1732, re-assembled in 1936)
- Church of the Assumption, Horozhanka (1792)
- Church of the Assumption, Liadske (1781)
- Church of the Assumption, Yarhoriv (1927)
- Church of the Dormition in Chortkiv (1583)
- Church of the Exaltation of the Holy Cross, Chaichyntsi (1776)
- Church of the Exaltation of Holy Cross, Chesnivskyi Rakovets (1860)
- Church of the Exaltation of Holy Cross, Kopychyntsi (1630)
- Church of the Exaltation of Holy Cross, Kremenets (1889)
- Church of the Intercession, Chekhiv (1885)
- Church of the Intercession, Medyn (1862)
- Church of the Intercession, Mozolivka (1888)
- Church of the Intercession, Musorivtsi (1746)
- Church of the Intercession, Rudnyky (16-17th century)
- Church of the Intercession, Sokilets (1635)
- Church of the Intercession, Stare Misto (1854)
- Church of the Intercession, Uhryniv (1936)
- Church of the Intercession, Vovkivtsi, Velyki Dederkaly rural hromada (1703)
- Church of the Nativity of the Theotokos, Chornokinetska Volia (1763)
- Church of the Nativity of the Theotokos, Plotycha (17th century)
- Church of Nativity of the Theotokos, Novosilka (1709)
- Church of the Nativity of the Theotokos, Shchasnivka, Ternopil Oblast (1905)
- Church of the Nativity of the Theotokos, Syrovary (18th century)
- Church of the Nativity of the Theotokos, Velyka Bilka, Lanivtsi urban hromada (1773)
- Church of the Nativity of the Theotokos, Zaruddia (1874)
- Church of the Presentation of Mary, Monastyryska (1871)
- Church of the Presentation of Mary, Stara Yahilnytsia (1794)
- Church of the Resurrection, Kudynivtsi (1847)
- Church of the Resurrection, Vistria (1754)
- Church of the Theotokos, Hryhoriv (1865)
- Church of Virgin Mary, Zastavtsi (1890)
- Church of Zarvanytsia Mother of God, Ternopil (2008)
- Exaltation of the Holy Cross Church, Shvaikivtsi (1734)
- Saints Borys and Hlib Church, Shumliany (1711)
- Saint George's Church, Katerynivka (1930)
- Saint Nicholas Church, Bokiv (1708)
- Saint Michael's Church, Butyn (1880)
- Saint Michael's Church, Nahirianka (17-18th centuries)
- Saint Michael's Church, Novostav, Shumsk urban hromada (1865)
- Saint Nicholas Church, Berezhany (1691)
- Saint Nicholas Church, Halushchyntsi (1754)
- Saint Nicholas Church, Lazarivka (1667-1669)
- Saint Nicholas Church, Luka (1927)
- Saint Nicholas Church, Sapohiv (1777)
- Saint Paraskeva's Church, Kozyna (1864)
- Saint Paraskeva's Church, Krohulets (1576?)
- Simeon Stylites Church, Dubivka (19th century)
- Transfiguration Church, Pidhaitsi (1772)
- Trinity Church, Holotky (1784)
- Trinity Church, Rokhmaniv (1730)
- Trinity Church, Trostiantsi (1911)
- Trinity Church, Vyshnivets (1892)
- Trinity Church, Zabolotivka (17th century)

=== Vinnytsia Oblast ===
- Assumption Church, Kokhanivka, Turbiv rural hromada (1867)
- Assumption Church, Kysliak, Haisyn urban hromada (1747)
- Assumption Church, Markivka, Vapniarka rural hromada (1767)
- Church of Alexander Nevsky, Znamenivka, Murovani Kurylivtsi rural hromada (1889)
- Church of Exaltation of the Holy Cross, Kozyntsi, Turbiv rural hromada (1877)
- Church of John the Baptist, Kosakivka, Turbiv rural hromada (1915)
- Church of the Nativity of Theotokos, Illintsi (1773)
- Church of the Nativity of Theotokos, Pechera (1762)
- Church of the Nativity of Theotokos, Sloboda-Sharhorodska, Sharhorod urban hromada (1750)
- Church of Nativity of Theotokos, Syvakivtsi, Turbiv rural hromada (1877, rebuilt in 1989)
- Church of Saint Paraskeva of Serbia, Nemiya, Mohyliv-Podilskyi urban hromada (1775)
- Church of the Intercession, Bernashivka, Yaryshiv rural hromada, Mohyliv-Podilskyi Raion (1872)
- Church of the Intercession, Katashyn, Chechelnyk rural hromada (1778)
- Church of the Kazan Icon of the Mother of God, Yaltushkiv (1873)
- Church of the Presentation of Mary, Ivanivtsi, Bar urban hromada (1760)
- Intercession Church, Bershad (18th century)
- Saint Demetrius Church, Ploske, Vendychany rural hromada (1717, restored in 1994)
- Saint Demetrius Church, Turbiv (late 19th century)
- Saint John the Evangelist Church, Tropove, Vendychany rural hromada (1767)
- Saint Michael's Church, Dashiv (1764)
- Saint Michael's Church, Voronovytsia (1751)
- Saint Nicholas Church, Borysivka, Illintsi urban hromada (1751)
- Saint Nicholas Church, Vinnytsia (1746)
- Saint Paraskeva Church, Stryzhavka rural hromada (1791)

=== Volyn Oblast ===
- Annunciation Church, Rakiv Lis, Kamin-Kashyrskyi urban hromada (1914)
- Assumption Church, Kachyn, Soshychne rural hromada (1589)
- Assumption Church, Kraska, Ratne settlement hromada (1783)
- Assumption Church, Samary (1865)
- Assumption Church, Shepel, Lutsk urban hromada (1780)
- Assumption Church, Zapruddia, Soshychne rural hromada (1795)
- Church of the Exaltation of Holy Cross, Kolona, Pavlivka rural hromada (1779)
- Church of the Exaltation of the Holy Cross, Turopyn, Turiisk settlement hromada (1777)
- Church of the Intercession, Liubytiv (1794)
- Church of the Nativity of Theotokos, Kamin-Kashyrskyi (1723)
- Church of the Nativity of Theotokos, Troianivka, Manevychi settlement hromada (1772)
- Church of the Nativity of Theotokos, Vyderta, Kamin-Kashyrskyi urban hromada (1737)
- Church of the Presentation of Virgin Mary, Pechykhvosty, Horokhiv urban hromada (1708)
- Holy Trinity Church, Sokil, Rozhyshche urban hromada (1853)
- Intercession Church, Brany, Marianivka settlement hromada (1725)
- Intercession Church, Metelne, Olyka urban hromada (1810)
- Kazan Church, Pishcha, Shatsk settlement hromada (1801)
- Saint Anne's Church, Pidberezzia, Horokhiv urban hromada (1645)
- Saint Anne's Church, Rzhyshchiv, Marianivka settlement hromada (1779)
- Saint Anne's Roman Catholic Church, Kovel (1771)
- Saint Demetrius Church, Hishyn, Kovel urban hromada (1567) - oldest wooden church in Ukrainian Polesia
- Saint Demetrius Church, Zghorany, Holovne settlement hromada (1674)
- Saint George's Church, Kutriv, Berestechko urban hromada (1761)
- Saint Michael's Church, Hrudky, Kamin-Kashyrskyi urban hromada (1775)
- Saint Michael's Church, Karasyn, Prylisne rural hromada (1691)
- Saint Michael's Church, Khoteshiv, Kamin-Kashyrskyi urban hromada (1790)
- Saint Michael's Church, Osa, Turiisk settlement hromada (1770s)
- Saint Nicholas Church, Borochyche, Marianivka settlement hromada (1678)
- Saint Nicholas Church, Buchyn, Liubeshiv settlement hromada (1926)
- Saint Nicholas Church, Smolyhiv, Torchyn settlement hromada (1743)
- Saint Paraskeva's Church, Osivtsi, Kamin-Kashyrskyi urban hromada (1777)
- Saint Stephen's Church, Usychi, Torchyn settlement hromada (1795)
- Transfiguration Church, Nuino, Soshychne rural hromada (1600)
- Transfiguration Church, Stara Vyzhivka (1869)

=== Zakarpattia Oblast ===
- Ascension Church, Yalove, Zhdeniievo settlement hromada (1803)
- **Ascension Church, Yasinia (1824)**
- Assumption Church, Novoselytsia, Korolevo settlement hromada (1656)
- Church of the Nativity of the Theotokos, Dilove (1750)
- Church of the Nativity of the Theotokos, Steblivka (Duboşari in Romanian, Száldobos in Hungarian), Khust urban hromada (1643)
- Church of the Presentation of Virgin Mary, Lokit, Irshava urban hromada (1734)
- Church of the Presentation of Virgin Mary, Roztoka, Pylypets rural hromada (17th century)
- Church of the Presentation of Virgin Mary, Torun, Mizhhiria rural hromada (1809)
- Church of Saint John the Baptist, Sukhyi, Tykhyi rural hromada (1769)
- Holy Spirit Church, Huklyvyi (18th century)
- Holy Spirit Church, Kolochava (1795)
- Holy Spirit Church, Kotelnytsia, Nyzhni Vorota rural hromada (1760)
- Intercession Church, Deshkovytsia, Irshava urban hromada (18th century)
- Intercession Church, Kostryna (1645)
- Intercession Church, Synevyrska Poliana, Synevyr rural hromada (1817)
- Reformed Church, Chetfalva (Csetfalva in Hungarian) (1645)
- Saint Anne's Church, Bukivtsiovo (17-18th century)
- Saint Basil's Church, Likitsary, Turi Remety rural hromada (1748)
- Saint Basil's Church, Sil, Kostryna rural hromada (1703)
- Saint Demetrius Church, Repynne, Mizhhiria rural hromada (1780)
- Saint Demetrius Church, Vilkhovytsia, Chynadiiovo settlement hromada (17th century)
- Saint Michael's Church, Bukovets, Pylypets rural hromada (1808)
- Saint Michael's Church, Krainykovo (formerly Steblivka between 1920–1938 and 1945–1946, Mihálka in Hungarian, Crainiceni in Romanian), Khust urban hromada (1668)
- Saint Michael's Church, Nehrovets, Kolochava rural hromada (1818)
- Saint Michael's Church, Neresnytsia (Nereşniţa in Romanian, Nyéresháza in Hungarian) (1813, destroyed by fire, rebuilt in Uzhhorod in 2013)
- Saint Michael's Church, Ruska Kuchava, Velyki Luchky rural hromada (18th century)
- Saint Michael's Church, Svaliava (1588)
- Saint Michael's Church, Uzhhorod (1777)
- **Saint Michael's Church, Uzhok (1745)**
- Saint Michael's Church, Vyshka, Kostryna rural hromada (17-18th century)
- Saint Nicholas Church, Chornoholova, Dubrynychi-Malyi Bereznyi rural hromada (1751)
- Saint Nicholas Church, Danylovo (Dănileşti in Romanian, Husztsófalva in Hungarian) (1779)
- Saint Nicholas Church, Husnyi, Stavne rural hromada (1655)
- Saint Nicholas Church, Izky, Pylypets rural hromada (17-18th century)
- Saint Nicholas Church, Kolodne (Darva in Romanian and Hungarian), Uglia rural hromada (1470)
- Saint Nicholas Church, Nyzhnia Apsha (Apşa din Jos in Romanian, Alsóapsa in Hungarian), Solotvyno settlement hromada (1604)
- Saint Nicholas Church, Podobovets, Pylypets rural hromada (17th century)
- Saint Nicholas Church, Pryslip, Mizhhiria rural hromada (1797)
- Saint Nicholas Church, Rekity, Mizhhiria rural hromada (1751)
- Saint Nicholas Church ("lower"), Serednie Vodiane (Apşa de Mijloc in Romanian, Középapsa in Hungarian), Solotvyno settlement hromada (17th century)
- Saint Nicholas Church ("upper"), Serednie Vodiane (1428) - oldest surviving wooden church in Ukraine.
- Saint Nicholas Church, Sokyrnytsia (Săclânţa in Romanian, Szeklencze in Hungarian) (1704)
- Saint Nicholas Church, Verkhnii Studenyi, Pylypets rural hromada (1804)
- Saint Paraskeva's Church, Oleksandrivka (Sândreni in Romanian, Sándorfalva in Hungarian), Khust urban hromada (1753)
- Saint Peter and Paul's Church, Uklyn, Poliana rural hromada (18t century)
- Saint Peter and Paul's Church, Yasinia (1780)

=== Zaporizhzhia Oblast ===
- Intercession (Pokrova) Church, Khortytsia, Zaporizhzhia (2007)

=== Zhytomyr Oblast ===
- Church of the Exaltation of the Holy Cross, Nova Buda, Potiivka rural hromada (1900)
- Church of the Nativity of the Theotokos, Viazivka (1862, destroyed in 2022 during the Russian invasion of Ukraine)
- Old Believer Church of the Intercession, Zhytomyr (1825)
- Saint Michael's Church, Kraivshchyna, Khoroshiv settlement hromada (1757)
- Saint Nicholas Church, Mezhyrichka, Korosten urban hromada (1772)
- Saint Nicholas Church, Vorsivka, Malyn urban hromada (1850)
- Saint Paraskeva's Church, Riasne, Barashi rural hromada (1771)
- Saint Theresa's Catholic Church, Kamianyi Brid, Zviahel Raion, Zhytomyr Oblast (1991)
- Trinity Church, Trokovychi, Oliivka rural hromada (1791)

== See also ==
- Carpathian wooden churches
- Vernacular architecture of the Carpathians
- Stave church, wooden churches of Scandinavia
- Vernacular architecture of Ukraine
- Wooden synagogues in the Polish-Lithuanian Commonwealth

== Bibliography ==
- Rescuing the Hidden European Wooden Churches Heritage an International Methodology for Implementing a Database for Restoration Projects. Ukraine (Kharkiv State Technical University of Construction and Architecture) ... Actual Restoration and Preservation Problems of the Ukrainian Wooden Churches
- Rotoff, Basil. Monuments to Faith: Ukrainian Churches in Manitoba. University of Manitoba Press, 1990.
- Shcherbakivskyĭ, Danylo. Ukraïnsʹke mystetstvo/L'art de l'Ukraïne. Kyĭv : Praha : Ukraïnskyĭ hromadskyí vydavnychyĭ fond, 1913.
