= Koropets =

Rural locality in Ternopil Oblast, Ukraine

Koropets Коропець Koropiec
- Rural settlement
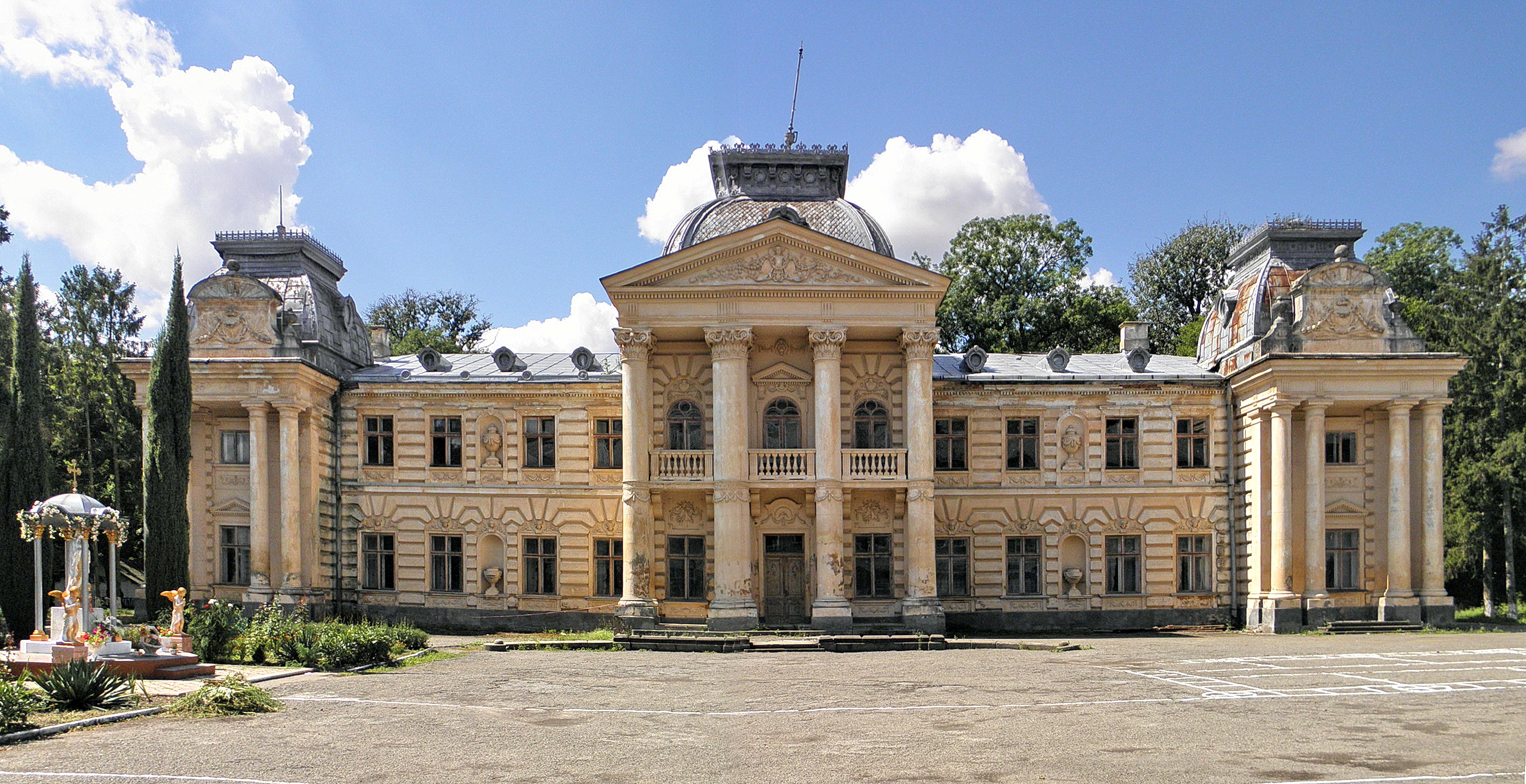
- View of the Koropets Palace, built in the beginning of the 19th century.

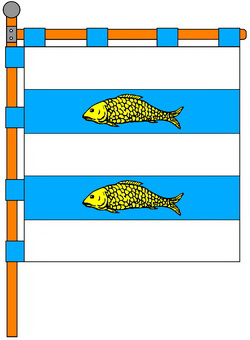
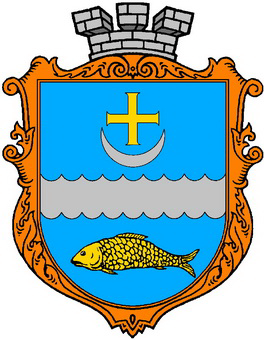
- Flag Coat of arms

- Location of Koropets in Ukraine Koropets (Ukraine)
- Coordinates: 48°56′19″N 25°10′46″E
- Country: Ukraine
- Oblast: Ternopil Oblast
- Raion: Chortkiv Raion
- Founded: 1421
- Town status: 1984

Government
  - Mayor: Hanna Kuilovska

Area
  - Total: 8.61 km^{2} (3.32 sq mi)
- Elevation: 201 m (659 ft)

Population (2022)
  - Total: 3,008
  - Density: 349/km^{2} (905/sq mi)
- Time zone: UTC+2 (EET)
  - Summer (DST): UTC+3 (EEST)
- Postal code: 48370
- Area code: +380 3555
- Website: http://rada.gov.ua/

Koropets (Ukrainian: Коропець; Polish: Koropiec) is a rural settlement in Chortkiv Raion, Ternopil Oblast, western Ukraine. Koropets was first founded in 1421, and it acquired the status of an urban-type settlement in 1984. Koropets hosts the administration of Koropets settlement hromada, one of the hromadas of Ukraine. Population: 3,008 (2022 estimate).

The rural settlement is located by the confluence of the Koropets River with the Dniester.

== History ==
Until 18 July 2020, Koropets belonged to Monastyryska Raion. The raion was abolished in July 2020 as part of the administrative reform of Ukraine, which reduced the number of raions of Ternopil Oblast to three. The area of Monastyryska Raion was merged into Chortkiv Raion.

The classical palace of Count Stanisław Badeni, built in the beginning of the 19th century, is located in the town of Koropets.

Until 26 January 2024, Koropets was designated urban-type settlement. On this day, a new law entered into force which abolished this status, and Koropets became a rural settlement.

== People from Koropets ==
- Bohdan Hawrylyshyn (1926–2016), economist and an economic advisor to the Ukrainian government.
