= Polish invasion of Czechoslovakia =

Polish invasion of Czechoslovakia can refer to:

- The annexation of parts of modern Czech territory by Poland in 1938
- The Polish participation in the Warsaw Pact invasion of Czechoslovakia in 1968

== See also ==
- Polish–Czechoslovak border conflicts
