= Koropets Palace =

Building in Ternopil Oblast, Ukraine

- Коропецький палац
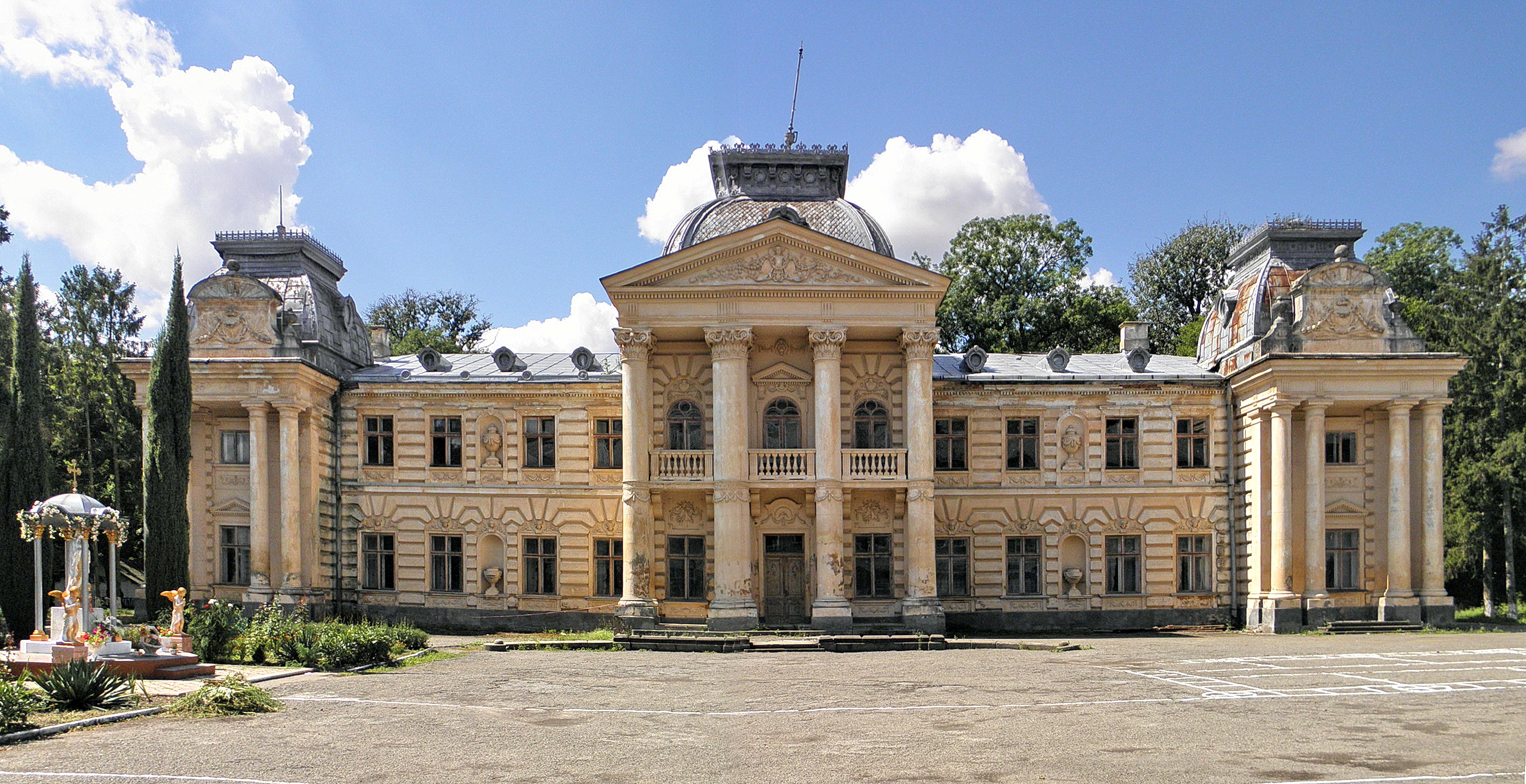
- Interactive map of the Koropets Palace area

General information
- Location: Koropets, Ternopil Oblast, Ukraine
- Coordinates: 48°56′18″N 25°10′45″E
- Opened: 1906

Koropets Palace (Ukrainian: Коропецький палац) is the family estate of Stanisław Badeni, located in Koropets, Ternopil Oblast, and an architectural monument of local importance.

== Details ==
It was built in the early 19th century by the Mysłowski family.

In 1906, the owner of Koropets, Stanisław Badeni, built a new two-story palace in the style of classicism and Viennese Renaissance on the site of the old palace. During the World War I, the building was destroyed, but later the Badeni family restored the estate. Under Stanisław Badeni, the park was expanded to 200 hectares (the author of the reconstruction was the city parks inspector Arnold Röhring).

Today the monument is in a state of disrepair.
