= Jarosław =

Town in Subcarpathian Voivodeship, Poland

- Town Hall

- Flag Coat of arms

- Location within Poland
- Coordinates: 50°1′7″N 22°40′47″E
- Country: Poland
- Voivodeship: Subcarpathian
- County: Jarosław
- Gmina: Jarosław (urban gmina)
- First mentioned: 1152
- Town rights: 1375

Government
  - Mayor: Marcin Nazarewicz (PL2050)

Area
  - Total: 34.46 km^{2} (13.31 sq mi)

Population (2023)
  - Total: 35,475
  - Density: 1,029/km^{2} (2,666/sq mi)
- Time zone: UTC+1 (CET)
  - Summer (DST): UTC+2 (CEST)
- Postal code: 37-500
- Vehicle registration: RJA
- Website: https://miastojaroslaw.pl/

Jarosław (Polish: [jaˈrɔswaf]) (Note: Ukrainian: Ярослав, romanized: Yaroslav, IPA: [jɐroˈslɑu̯]; Yiddish: יאַרעסלאָוו, romanized: Yareslov; German: Jaroslau) is a town in southeastern Poland, situated on the San River. The town had 35,475 inhabitants in 2023. It is the capital of Jarosław County in the Subcarpathian Voivodeship.

Founded in the Middle Ages, Jarosław is a former residential town of various prominent Polish magnate families. It prospered as a trade center due to its location at the intersection of important trade routes, and was a notable regional center of education. Jarosław features a preserved old town with especially notable Renaissance and Baroque landmarks.

== History ==
Jarosław is located in the territory of the old Polish tribe of the Lendians, which became part of the Duchy of Poland under Mieszko I. According to tradition, the town was established in 1031 by Yaroslav the Wise, after the area was annexed from Poland by the Kievan Rus', although the first confirmed mention of the town comes from 1152. The region was eventually regained by Poland, and the settlement was granted Magdeburg town rights by Polish Duke Vladislaus II of Opole in 1375.

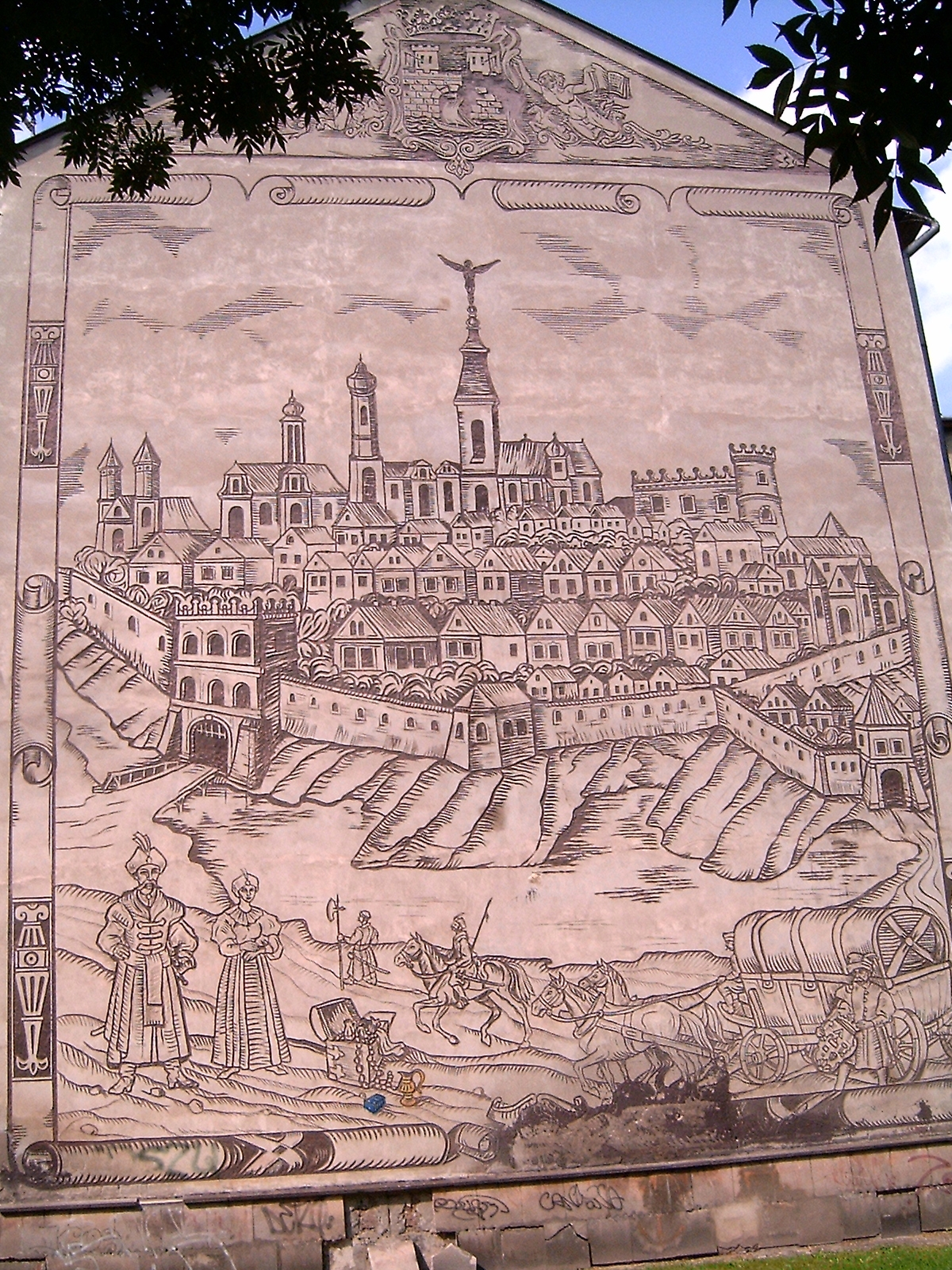
A historical view of Jarosław on a mural in the town center

The city quickly developed as an important trade centre and port on the San River, reaching the period of its greatest prosperity in the 16th and 17th centuries. It had trade routes linking Silesia with Ruthenia, Gdańsk, and Hungary. Merchants from such distant countries as Spain, England, Finland, Armenia and Persia arrived for the annual three-week-long fair on the feast of the Assumption.

Jarosław was a private town of Polish nobility, including the Tarnowski, Jarosławski, Odrowąż, Kostka, Sieniawski, Zamoyski, Wiśniowiecki, Koniecpolski, Sobieski, Sanguszko and Czartoryski families. The Jarosławski family of Leliwa coat of arms hailed from the town.

In 1575 a Jesuit college was established in Jarosław. The college's prestige extended beyond the region to more distant parts of Poland, as well as to Hungary and Wallachia. A theater was established at the college, where religious and secular plays were performed, religious music concerts were held, and poetry was written and published. The college had one of the largest libraries in Poland. In 1621, the first Jesuit printing house was founded. Famous students included the founder of the Congregation of Marian Fathers of the Immaculate Conception Stanislaus Papczyński, deputy of the Sejm Janusz Paweł Ostrogski, Renaissance writer and royal secretary Piotr Ciekliński, and Rector of the Jagiellonian University Sebastian Sierakowski.

In the 1590s Tatars from the Ottoman Empire pillaged the surrounding countryside. (See Moldavian Magnate Wars, The Magnate Wars (1593–1617), Causes.) They were unable to overcome the city's fortifications, but their raids started to diminish the city's economic strength and importance. Outbreaks of bubonic plague in the 1620s, and the invasion known as the Swedish Deluge in 1655–60 further undermined the city's prominence. In March 1656, led by Polish national hero Stefan Czarniecki, the Poles defeated the invading Swedes under King Charles X Gustav in the Battle of Jarosław. In the Great Northern War of 1700-21, the region was repeatedly pillaged by Russian, Saxon, and Swedish armies, causing the city to decline further.

After the fall of the Rákóczi's War of Independence against Austria in 1711, Hungarian leader Francis II Rákóczi and his court, including essayist Kelemen Mikes, found refuge in Jarosław. In 1711, Rákóczi and some Hungarians left for Gdańsk, while some stayed, and later on, several Hungarians were buried in the local Corpus Christi Collegiate Church, before their exhumation and burial in Hungary in 1907.

In the mid-eighteenth century, Roman Catholics constituted 53.7% of the population, members of the Greek Catholic Church 23.9%, and Jews 22.3%.

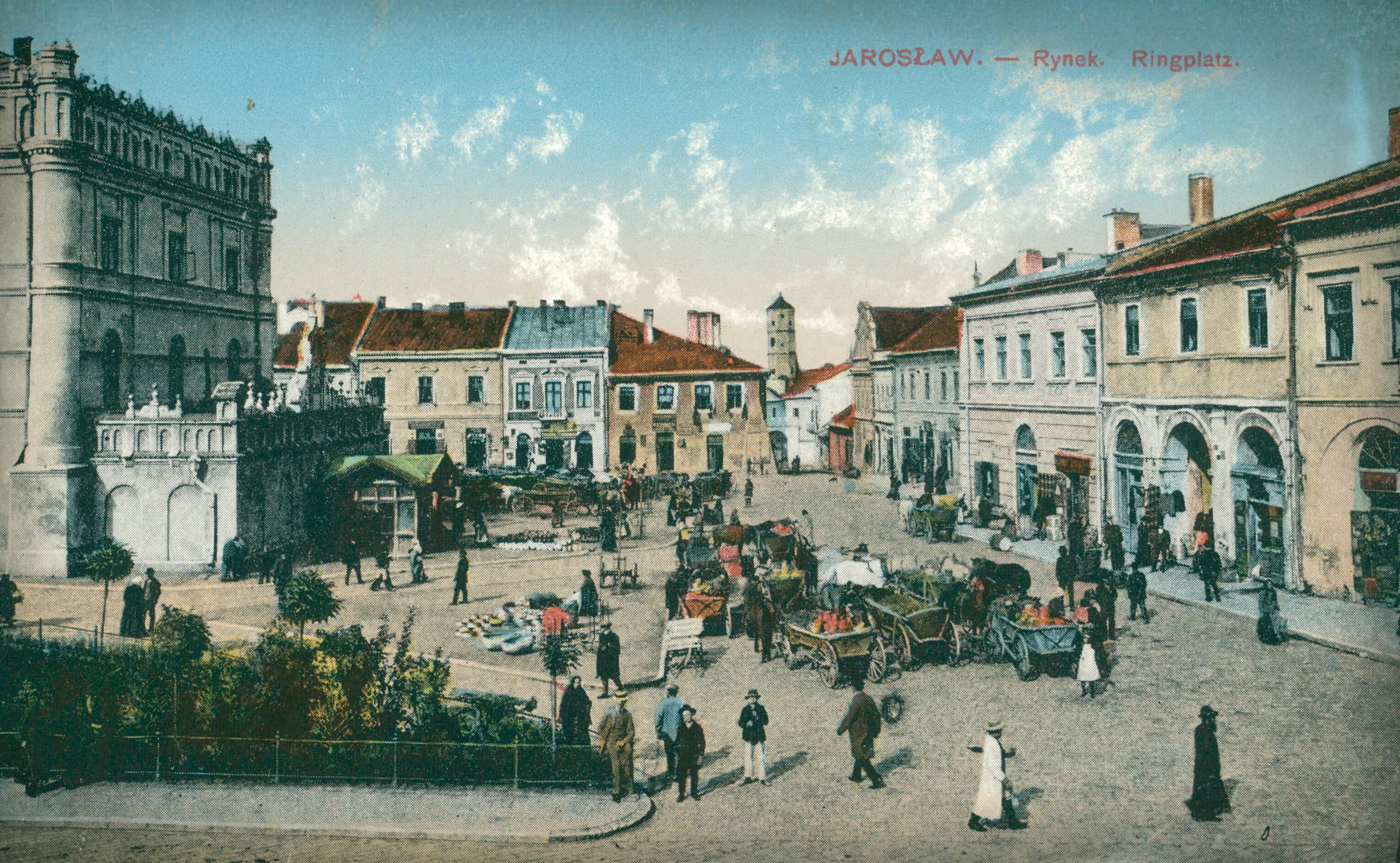
Market square, after 1895

Jarosław was annexed by Austria in the First Partition of Poland in 1772. It was part of newly formed Galicia (Austrian Partition) until Poland regained independence in 1918 following World War I. In 1914, Russian soldiers carried out a pogrom in the town, killing more than 150 Jews. In the interbellum period the city was administratively located in the Polish Lwów Voivodeship.

Memorials to victims and veterans of World War II

During the German invasion of Poland in September 1939, which started World War II, this was the site of the Battle of Jarosław. Germany defeated the Poles and captured the town. Shortly afterwards the German Einsatzgruppe I entered the town to commit various atrocities against the population. Under German occupation, the town was part of the Kraków District of the General Government. Over 60 Poles, who were either born, educated or lived and worked in Jarosław, including several policemen and the former county police chief, were murdered by the Russians in the Katyn massacre in 1940. In mid-1941, the Germans relocated the Stalag 327 prisoner-of-war camp from Rymanów to Jarosław, and then moved it to Sanok and established a subcamp of the Stalag 315 camp in Jarosław. The Polish resistance movement was active in the town, and established a dedicated organization to provide aid to prisoners of war, and distributed Polish underground newspapers Odwet and Głos Ludu.

In 1944, the town was captured by the Red Army of the Soviet Union and restored to Poland, although with a Soviet-installed communist regime, which remained in power until the Fall of Communism in the 1980s. Some local Polish resistance officers were arrested by the Soviets and imprisoned in a Soviet camp in Trzebuska. The communists expelled most of Jarosław's Ukrainian population, at first to Soviet territories and later to territories regained from Germany.

It was administratively located in the Rzeszów Voivodeship (1945–1974) and Przemyśl Voivodeship (1975–1998).

== Jewish Jarosław ==
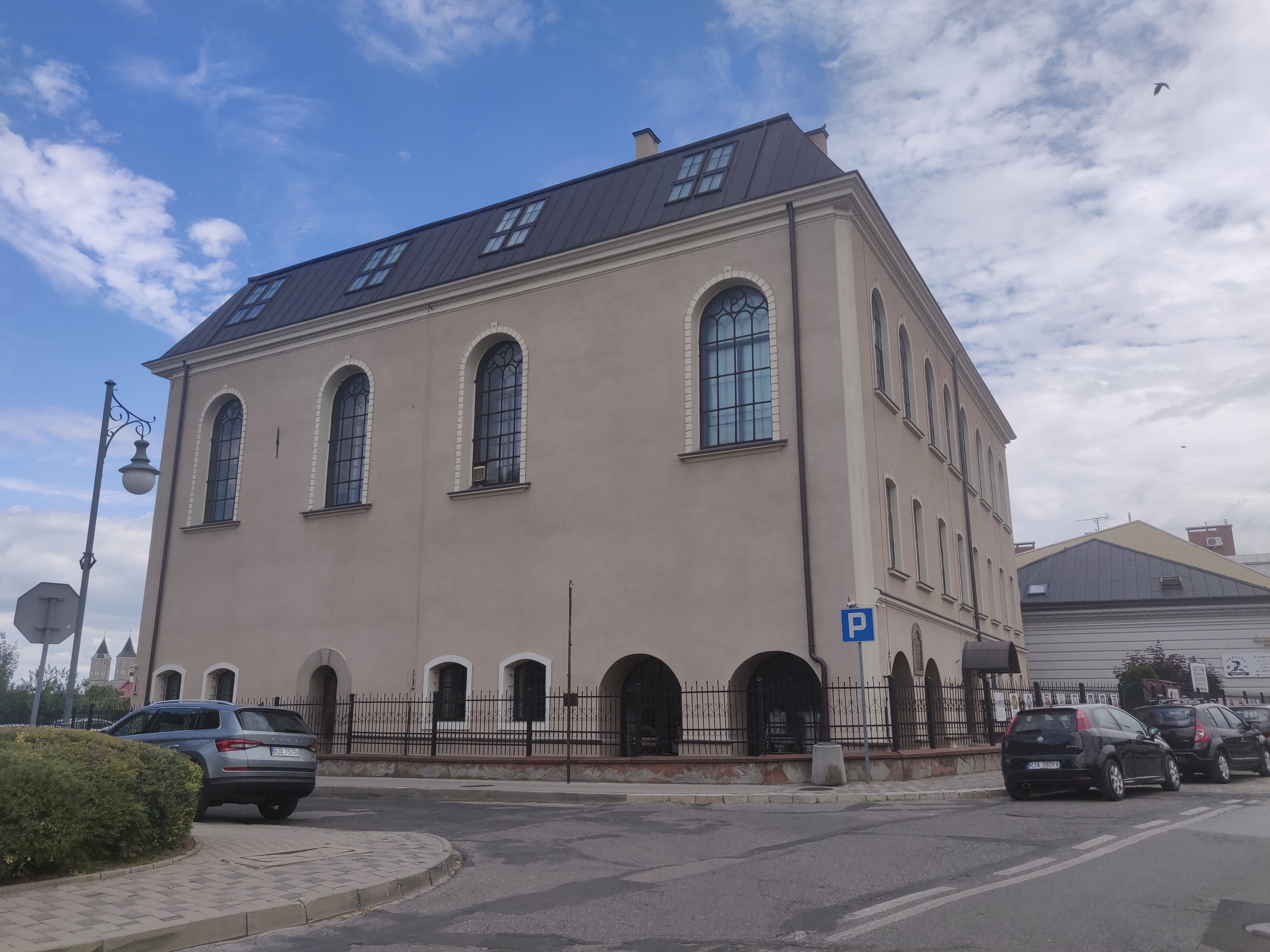
Great Synagogue, 2022

The first Jews reportedly arrived in Jarosław in 1464. The first rabbi of Jarosław was Rabbi Nathan Neta Ashkenazi, in 1590. A year later, the new Council of Four Lands (Vaad Arba Aratzot) began convening in Jarosław, rotating the meetings with the city of Lwów (Lviv).

Until 1608 with a small Jewish community, religious facilities were not allowed. Still, Rabbi Solomon Efraim of Lontschitz (the author of "Kli Yakar"), a prominent and well known rabbi, lived here. By 1670 there was a large "government" synagogue created, although protested by the Christian community of the city. During attacks on the city by Tatars and Swedes, Jewish merchandise and sometimes homes were set on fire. In 1765, there were 1,884 Jews in the city and towns around it. A Jewish school was established sometime later. The famous rabbi Levi Isaac of Berdyczów (Berdychiv) studied in Jarosław circa 1760 and was called "the genius of Yeruslav". A fire in 1805 burnt down the old synagogue and a new one was established more according to tradition to replace it. The new synagogue was completed in 1811. A census taken in 1901 notes that Jews were 25% of the population: 5701 Jewish families.

In a story about Jacob Kranc told by Rabbi Jacob Orenstein around 1850, about the appointment of the Jarosław rabbi, Rabbi Orenstein had refused the appointment of Rabbi of Jarosław because it would be against his old uncle's appointment. The city council had already written his appointment and wished to express their sorrow for its cancellation. The Dubner Magid had just entered the city on a snowy winter day, and was taken directly to Orenstein's house, together with the city council, who happened to pass by him. But the walk up the steps was enough to create a moving speech, remembered years later, and accounted for in the book.

In 1921 the last rabbi was appointed, Rabbi Shmaiya HaLevi Steinberg. He wrote a book about the Jews of his town, and in the 1930s sent two copies to the National Hebrew Library in Jerusalem. These copies are the only surviving copies of the book after the Holocaust.

In September 1939, Jarosław was captured by Germans. Most of the Jews crossed the San river to the Soviet-occupied part of Poland and hid in the Carpathian mountains, including the elder rabbi and his family. Those that stayed were shot and killed by the German soldiers.

== Sights ==
Market Square

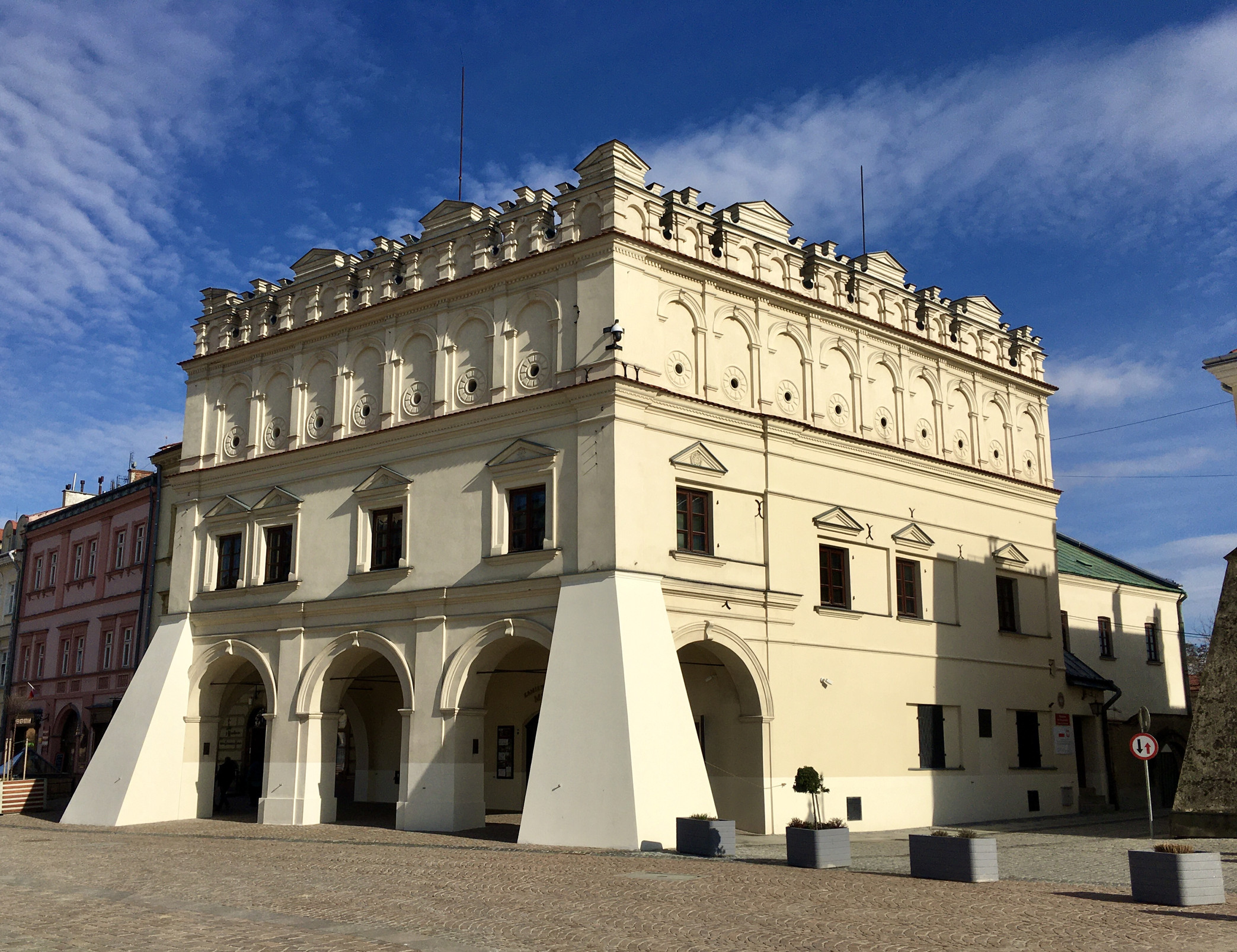
Orsetti Museum

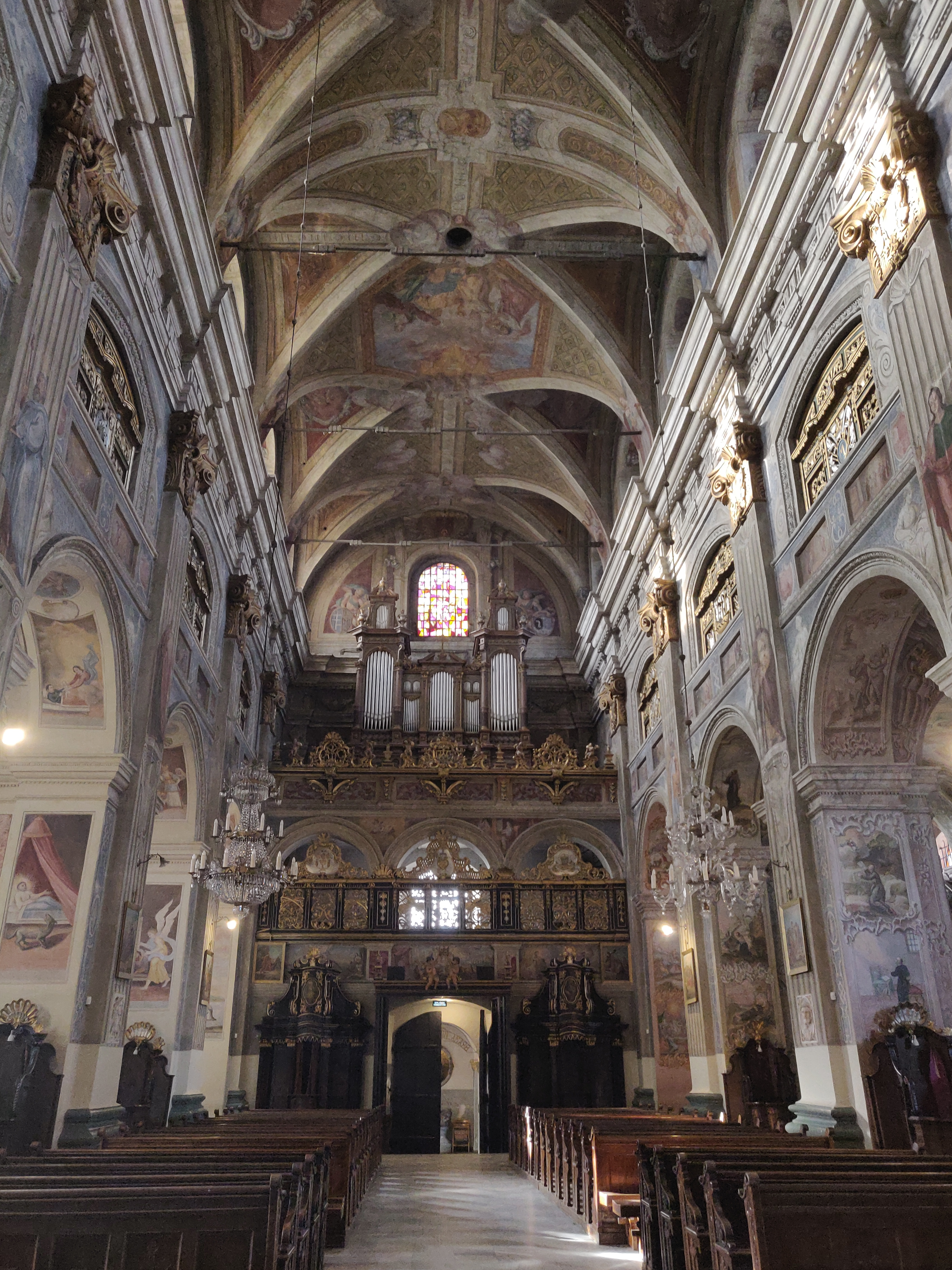
Dominican Church

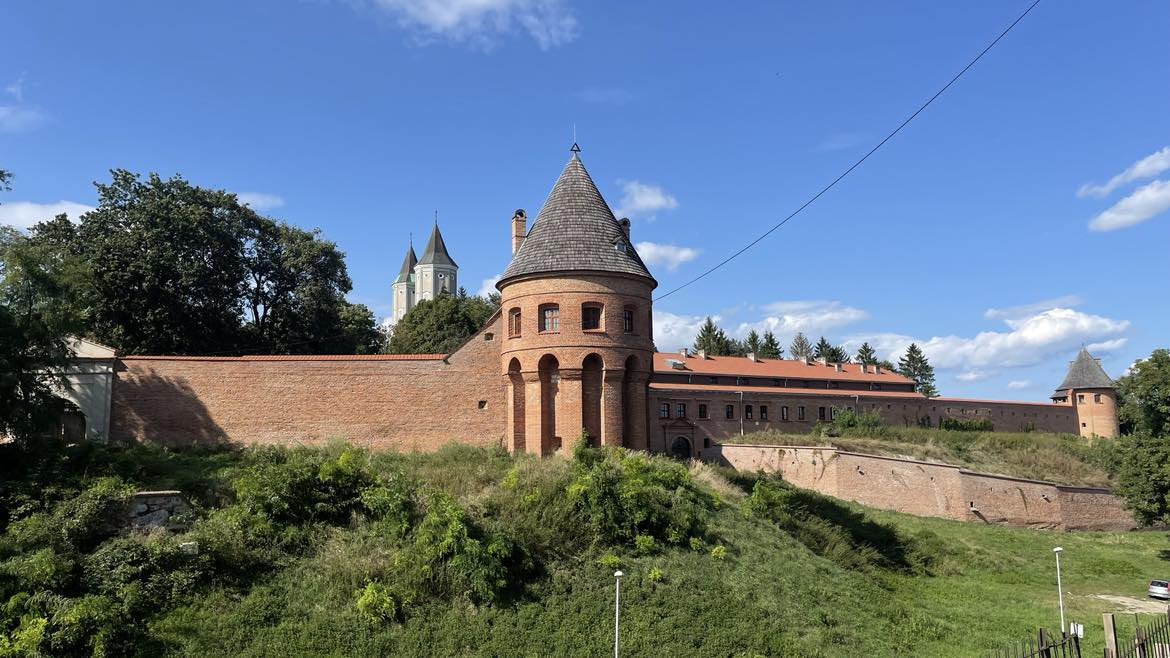
Medieval town walls

Municipal Culture Centre

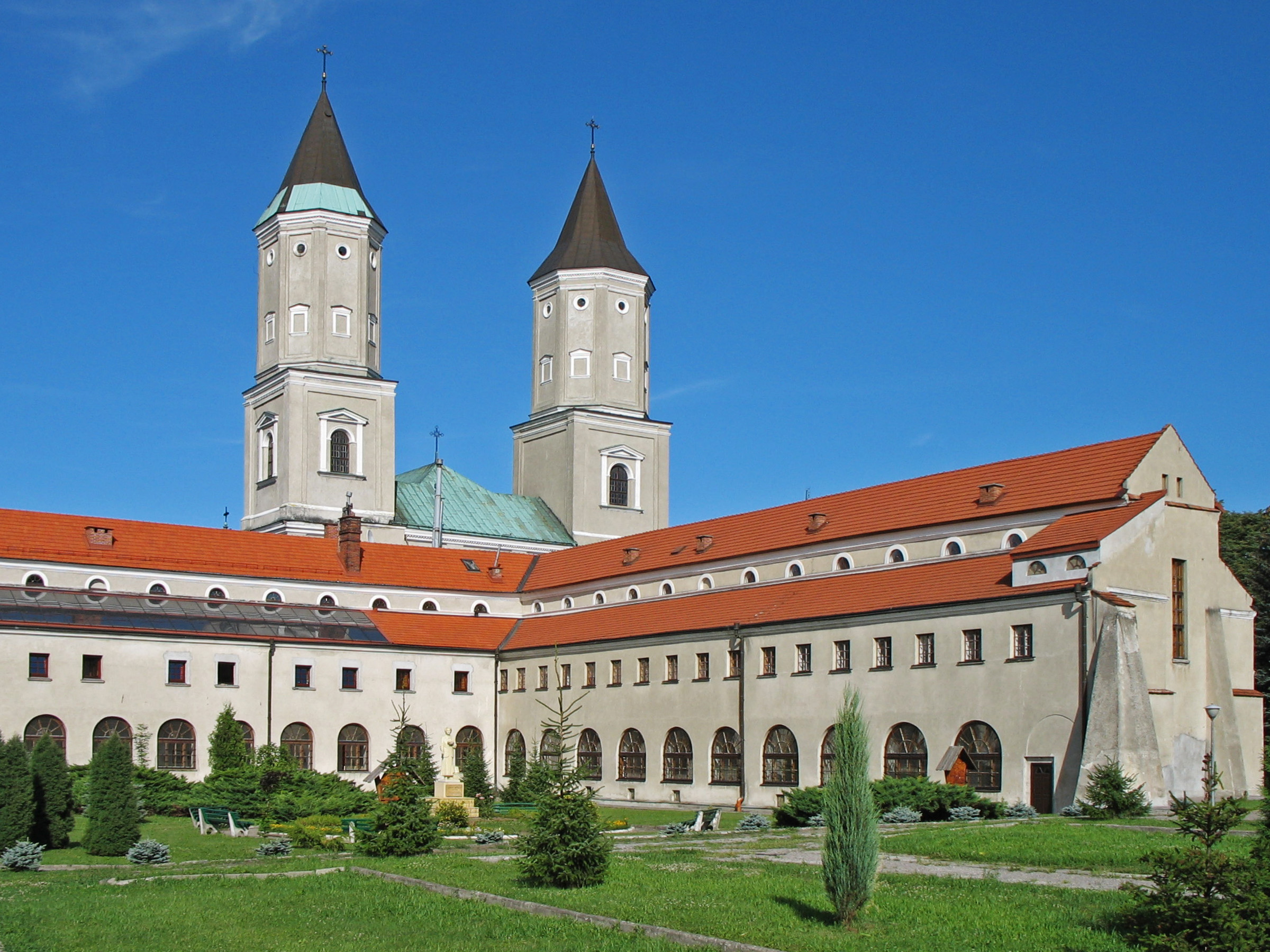
St. Nicholas Church and Benedictine Monastery

- Kraków Gate and old fortifications
- Main Square
- City Hall
- Municipal Culture Centre, former seat of the "Sokół" Polish Gymnastic Society
- Old market hall
- Pełkinie Palace
- Rydzikowska house
- Renaissance Orsetti Museum
- Attavanti House, now the Center for Culture and City Promotion
- Gruszewiczowska House
- Queen Marie's House
- Renaissance Collegiate Church of Corpus Christi, the oldest former Jesuit church in Poland
- Benedictine Abbey
- Baroque Basilica of Our Lady of Sorrows
- Dominican Monastery
- Baroque Church of the Holy Trinity
- Baroque Church of the Holy Spirit
- Old Synagogue
- Small Synagogue
- Modernist railway station building

== Sports ==
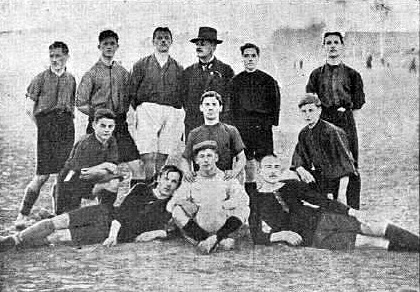
Footballers of JKS 1909 Jarosław in 1909

Jarosław is a town with a long sports history. In 1889, a branch of the "Sokół" Polish Gymnastic Society was founded in Jarosław. Nowadays, the town's most notable sports club are:

- JKS 1909 Jarosław, one of the region's oldest football teams, which competes in the lower leagues
- Znicz Jarosław, men's basketball team, which competed in the Polish Basketball League (country's top division) in the past, most recently in the 2009–10 season
- JKS Jarosław, women's handball team, which competes in the Polish Women's Superliga (country's top division)
- San Jarosław, women's volleyball team, which competes in the I liga (second division)

== Notable people ==
- Harry Abend (1937–2021), Polish-born Venezuelan sculptor and architect
- Arkadiusz Baran (born 1979), Polish football player
- Stanisław Marcin Badeni (1850–1912), Polish politician and a statesman of Austro-Hungarian Galicia
- Michał Boym (1612–1659), Polish Jesuit missionary to China
- Wiktor Brillant (1877–1942), Polish pharmacist
- Edmond Wilhelm Brillant (1916–2004), Polish-born Israeli naval architect
- Salomon Buber (1827–1906), Jewish Galician scholar
- Antoni Chruściel (1895–1960), Polish military officer, commander of all the armed forces of the Warsaw Uprising of 1944
- Stefan Czarniecki (1599–1665), Polish nobleman, general and military commander
- Simon Dubnow (1860–1941), Jewish-born Russian historian, writer and activist
- Aleksander Fredro (1793–1876), Polish poet, playwright and author of the Romantic Era
- Mieczysław Gębarowicz (1893–1984), Polish art historian, soldier, dissident, museum director and custodian of cultural heritage
- Mieczysław Golba (born 1966), Polish politician
- Jerzy Hordyński (1919–1998), Polish poet and writer
- Mieczysław Kasprzak (born 1953), Polish politician
- Bohdan Khmelnytsky (1595–1657), Ukrainian Hetman of the Zaporozhian Host, national hero of Ukraine
- Władysław Koba (1914–1949), Polish military officer
- Roman Kudlyk (1941–2019), Ukrainian poet and writing critic
- Dov Lior (born 1933), Israeli Orthodox rabbi
- Siegfried Lipiner (1856–1911), Austrian writer and poet
- Hieronim Augustyn Lubomirski (1648–1706), Polish noble, magnate, politician and military commander
- Konstanty Jacek Lubomirski (1620–1663) was a Polish nobleman
- Stanyslav Lyudkevych (1879–1979), Ukrainian composer, theorist, teacher, and musical activist
- Stanisław Maczek (1892–1994) Polish general, tank commander of World War II, whose division was instrumental in the Allied liberation of France
- Jakub Mareczko (born 1994), Italian cyclist of Polish descent
- Rostislav Mikhailovich (1225–1262), Rus' prince
- Jerzy Mniszech (c. 1548–1613), Polish nobleman and diplomat
- Zofia Odrowąż (1537–1580), Polish noblewoman
- Anna Alojza Ostrogska (1600–1654), Polish–Lithuanian noblewoman
- Józef Pomiankowski (1866–1929), Austro-Hungarian Marshal and later General of Polish Army
- Lionel S. Reiss (1894–1988), Polish-American Jewish painter
- Wilhelm Ritter von Thoma (1891–1948), German army officer
- Moses Schorr (1874–1941), rabbi, Polish historian, politician, Bible scholar, assyriologist and orientalist
- Arieh Sharon (1900–1984), Israeli architect
- Franciszek Siarczyński (1758–1829), Polish Roman Catholic priest
- Piotr Skarga (1536–1612), Polish Jesuit, preacher, hagiographer, polemicist
- Janina Skirlińska (1907–1993), Polish artistic gymnast
- Sam Spiegel (1901–1985), Austro-Polish-born American independent film producer
- Ozjasz Storch (1913–1938), Polish-Jewish reserve soldier of the Polish Armed Forces, one of two Polish fatalities during the 1938 annexation of Trans-Olza
- Joseph Wilf (1925–2016), Polish-born American businessman
- Yaroslav I the Wise (978–1054), Grand Prince of Veliky Novgorod and Kiev
- Mordecai Yoffe (1530–1612), a Rabbi
- Bogdan Zając (born 1972), Polish footballer
- Andrzej Tomasz Zapałowski (born 1966), Polish politician

== Twin towns and sister cities ==
Jarosław is twinned with:

- Michalovce in Slovakia (since 1998)
- Orange in France (since 2000)
- Dingelstädt in Germany (since 2001)
- Vyškov in Czech Republic (since 2001)
- Uzhhorod in Ukraine (since 2002)
- Humenné in Slovakia (since 2005)
- Yavoriv in Ukraine (since 2006)
- Schönebeck in Germany (pending ratification)
- Kőbánya in Hungary (since 2012)
- Svidník in Slovakia (since 2013)
