= Dibrova, Chortkiv Raion, Ternopil Oblast =

Rural locality in Ternopil Oblast, Ukraine

Dibrova Діброва
- Location in Ternopil Oblast
- Coordinates: 48°58′9″N 25°8′9″E
- Country: Ukraine
- Oblast: Ternopil Oblast
- Raion: Chortkiv Raion
- Hromada: Koropets settlement hromada
- Time zone: UTC+2 (EET)
  - Summer (DST): UTC+3 (EEST)
- Postal code: 48305

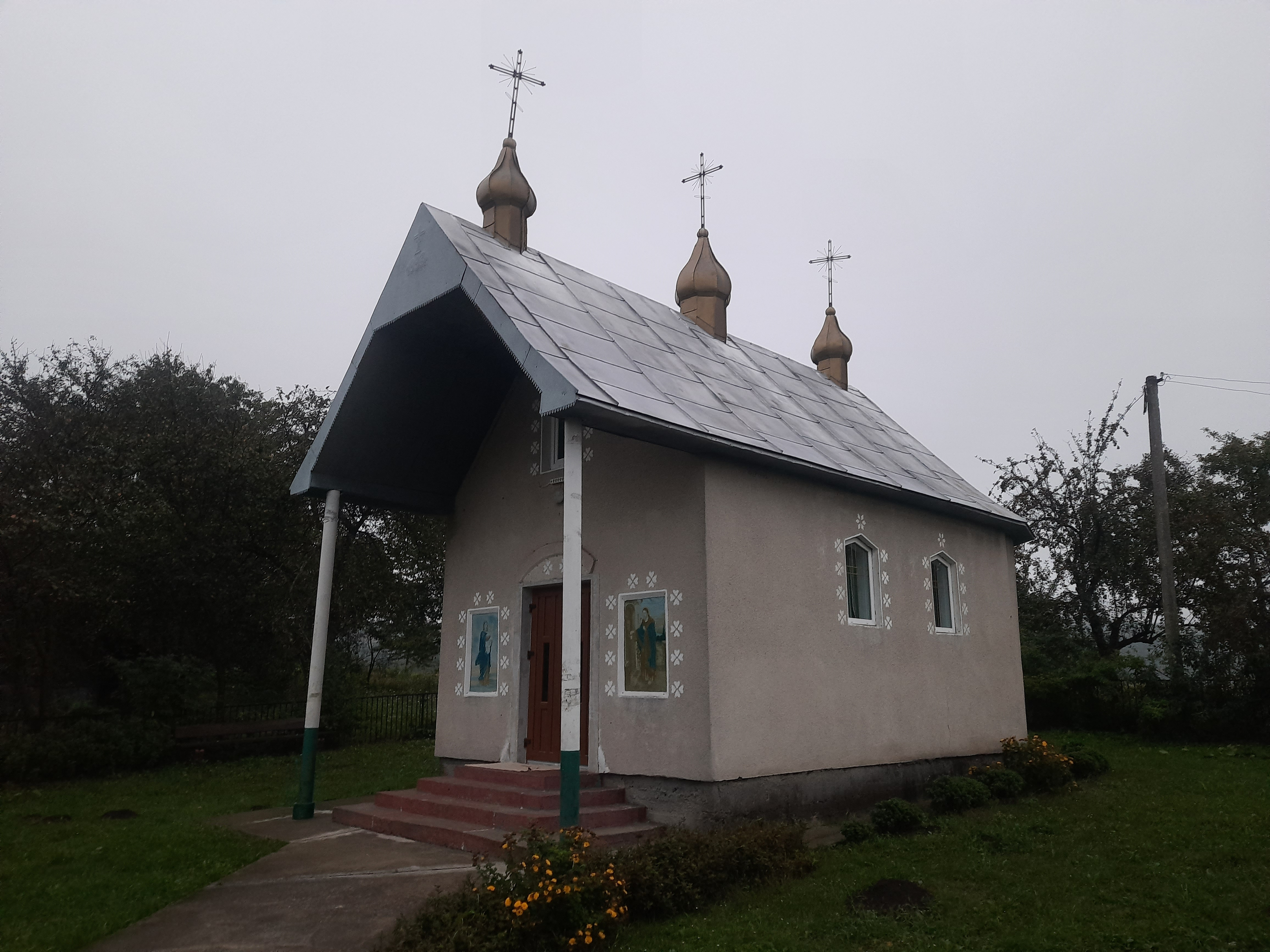
Chapel of the Holy Trinity, Dibrova village Chortkiv district, Ternopil region

Dibrova (Ukrainian: Діброва) is a village in Koropets settlement hromada, Chortkiv Raion, Ternopil Oblast, Ukraine.

== History ==
The village of Dibrova was a khutir and belonged to the village of Vistria, called Dibrova-Vistrianska.

After the liquidation of the Monastyryska Raion on 19 July 2020, the village became part of the Chortkiv Raion.

== Religion ==
- Holy Trinity church (1993).

== Sources ==
- (in Ukrainian) Лашта Г., Діброва // Ternopil Encyclopedic Dictionary: in 4 v. / editorial board: H. Yavorskyi and other, Ternopil: "Zbruch", 2004, V. 1: А—Й, S. 498. — ISBN 966-528-197-6.
