= Horyhliady =

Rural locality in Ternopil Oblast, Ukraine

Horyhliady Горигляди
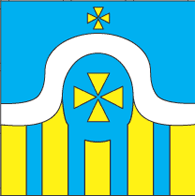
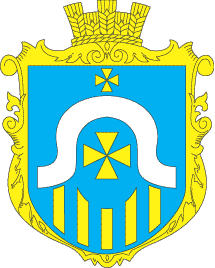
- Flag Coat of arms

- Location in Ternopil Oblast
- Coordinates: 48°52′32″N 25°8′53″E
- Country: Ukraine
- Oblast: Ternopil Oblast
- Raion: Chortkiv Raion
- Hromada: Koropets settlement hromada
- Time zone: UTC+2 (EET)
  - Summer (DST): UTC+3 (EEST)
- Postal code: 48372

Horyhliady (Ukrainian: Горигляди) is a village in Koropets settlement hromada, Chortkiv Raion, Ternopil Oblast, Ukraine.

== History ==
It was first mentioned in writings in 1421.

After the liquidation of the Monastyryska Raion on 19 July 2020, the village became part of the Chortkiv Raion.

== Religion ==
- Saint Onufriy church (1820, wooden, UGCC),
- Hall of the Kingdom of Jehovah's Witnesses prayer house (1997).

== Sources ==
- (in Ukrainian) Михайлюк М., Горигляди // Ternopil Encyclopedic Dictionary: in 4 v. / editorial board: H. Yavorskyi and other, Ternopil: "Zbruch", 2004, V. 1: А—Й, S. 395—396. — ISBN 966-528-197-6.
- "Horyhlady". Geographical Dictionary of the Kingdom of Poland (in Polish). 3. Warszawa: Kasa im. Józefa Mianowskiego. 1882. p. 157.
