= Wiktor Brillant =

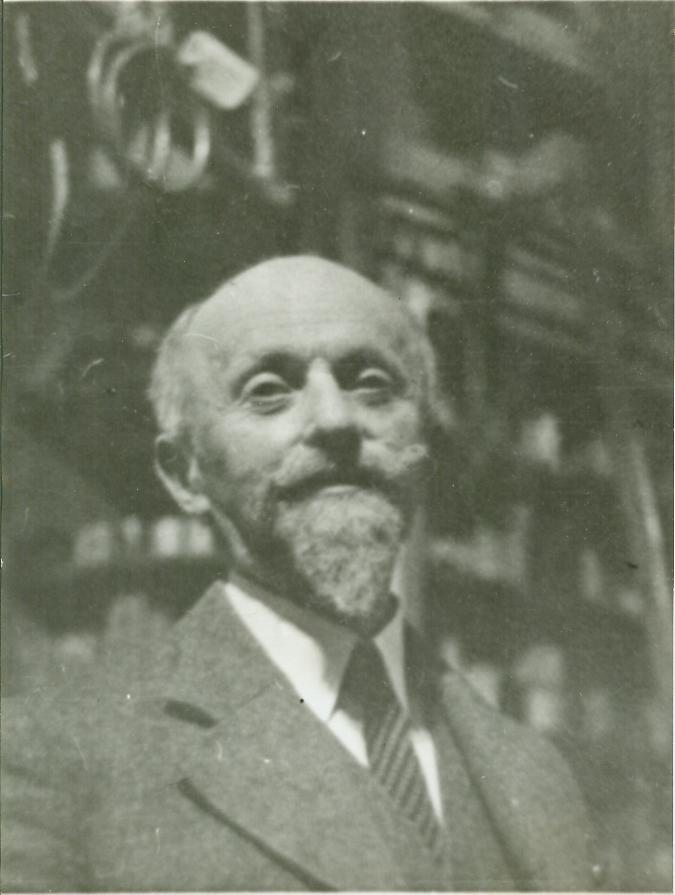
Wiktor Brillant M.Sc pharmaceutics at his Pharmacy in Jaroslaw

Wiktor Brillant (1877–1942) was a Polish pharmacist from Jaroslaw (Galicia, Poland) who was killed by the Nazis.

== Family ==
Wiktor was the eldest son of Henrieta (née Rapaport) (1846–1918) and Karl Brillant from Tarnopol, then a part of the Austrian Empire. Wiktor's sister Dora Brillant was born in 1881.

Wiktor married Laura Brillant (née Sturmlauf) on August 28, 1904 at Przemysl. They had four sons. Karol-Ludwig, also a pharmacist, was born in 1905 and was killed by the Nazis in 1942. Maximillian, an electrical engineer, was born in 1906 and immigrated to Palestine in 1934. Yohanan-Yan was born in 1914, served in the Anders-Army, and came to Palestine in 1942. Edmond Wilhelm was born in 1916, emigrated to Palestine in 1936, and became a naval architect. After serving in the British Royal Navy in World War II, Edmond became one of the founding fathers of the Israeli Navy. The family residence was at May-3 street in Jaroslaw.

Wiktor Brillant was a first cousin of Dr. Adolf Sternschuss who is commemorated in Krakow National Museum, and Michał Sternschuss-Staniewski.

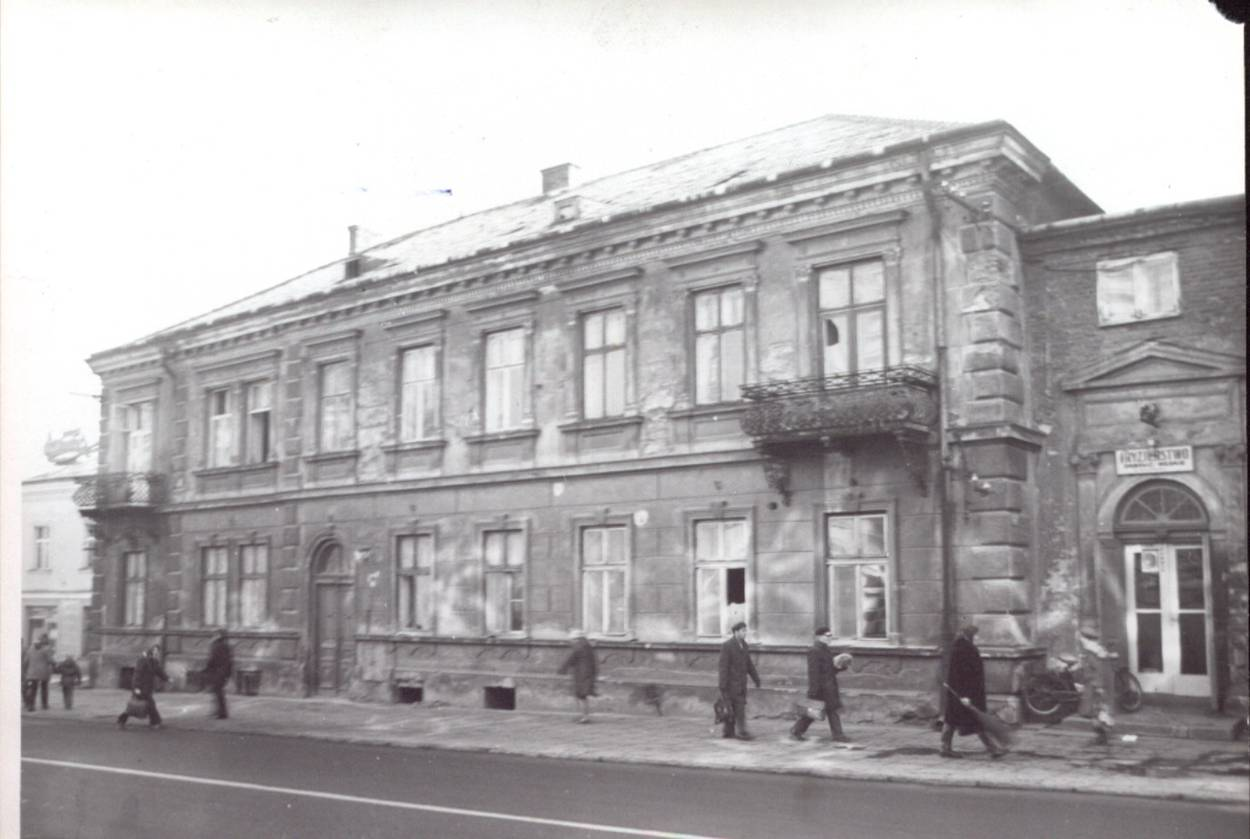
House of Brillant Family May 3rd Street Jaroslaw

== Professional career ==
Wiktor earned a M.Sc degree in pharmaceutics. In 1928 he opened a pharmacy at 16 Grunwaldzka Street in Jaroslaw. The name of his pharmacy was "Pod Czarnym Psem" (Polish for "The Black Dog"). In 1908, he won a gold medal in a show in Berlin, and took third place with bronze medal at an industrial exhibition held at the Jaroslaw park now known as the Park of Heroes of Monte Cassino.

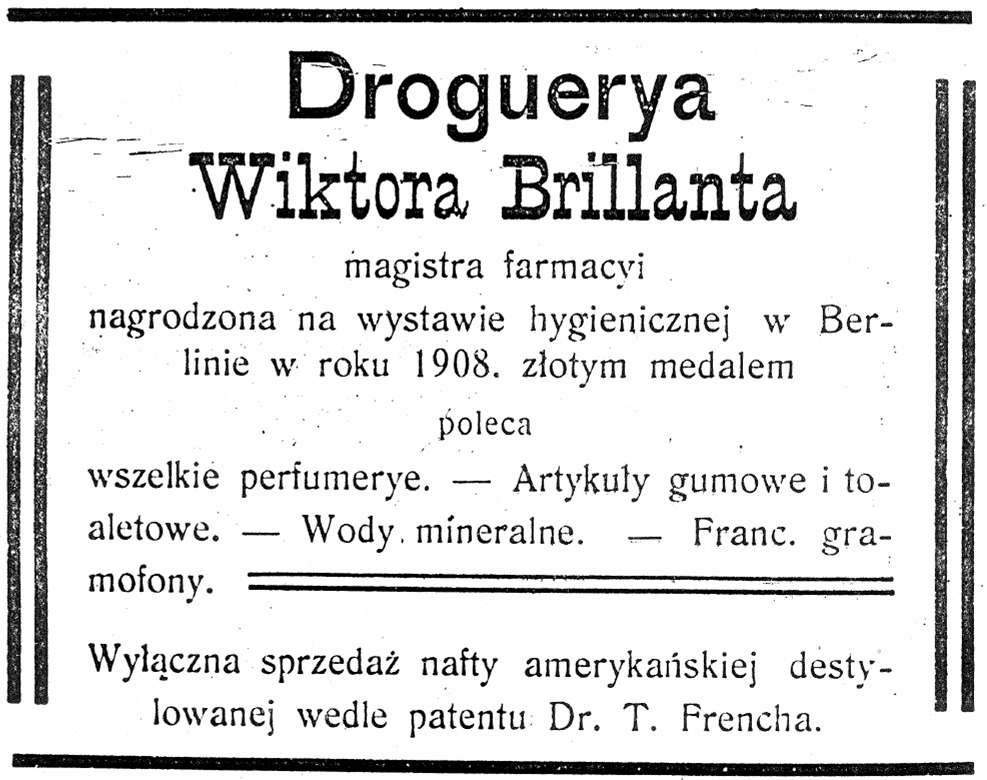
Commercial of Wiktor Brillant Pharmacy in Jaroslaw

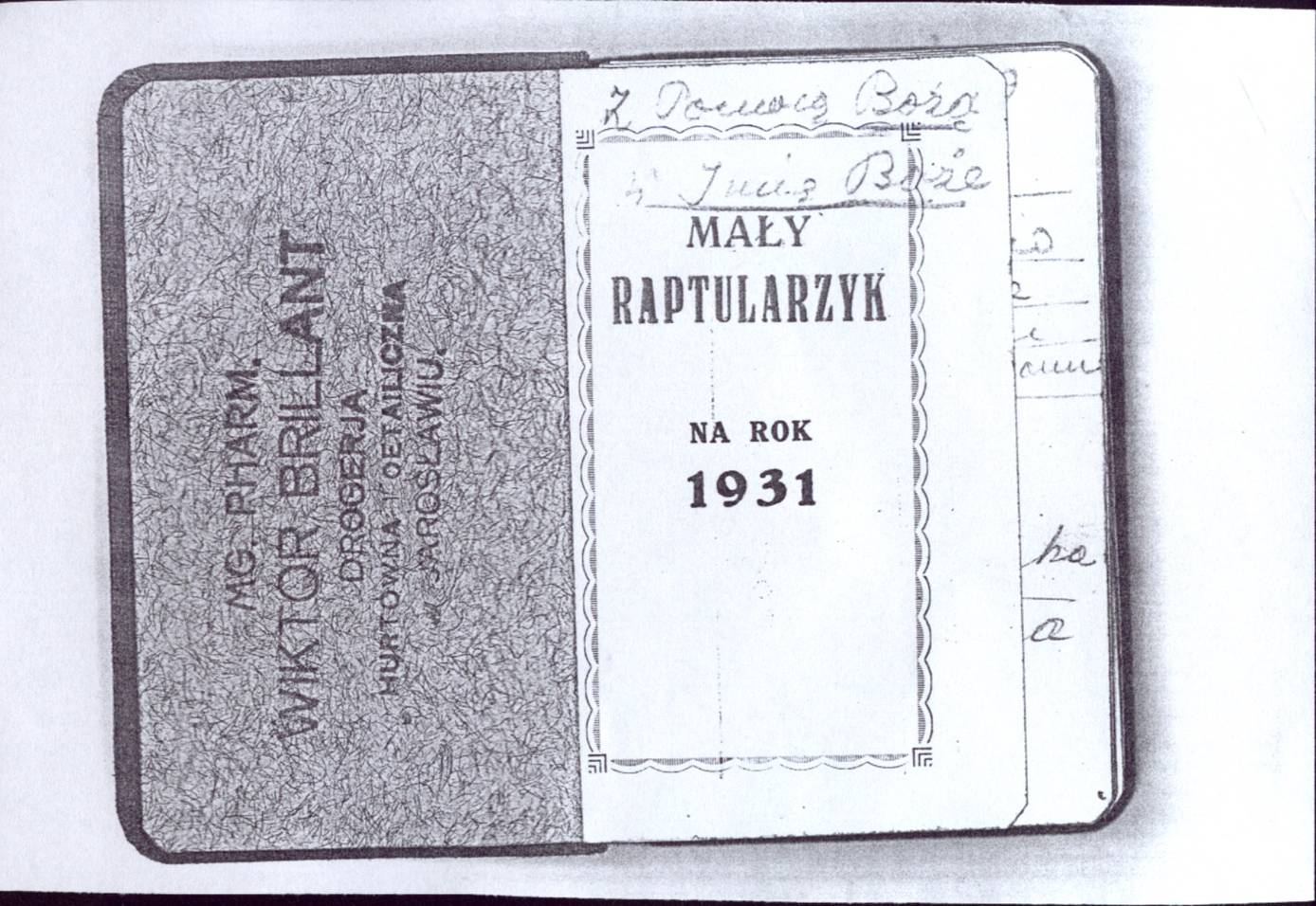
Wiktor's Agenda Book with his stamp of Pharmacy in Jaroslaw and academic degree

== World War II ==
In World War II, Wiktor was taken as a hostage by the Nazis. Since he was a prominent Jew, he appeared as the first in the hostages list. He was robbed by the Nazis and was deported with his wife Laura and two sons Karol and Yohanan across the River San to the Soviet side. They moved to Tarnopol to the home of Laura's sister, Bronislava Hefter. In Tranopol, Wiktor opened a pharmacy. In 1942 Wiktor, Laura and Karol were killed by the Nazis after their deportation to Zloczow.

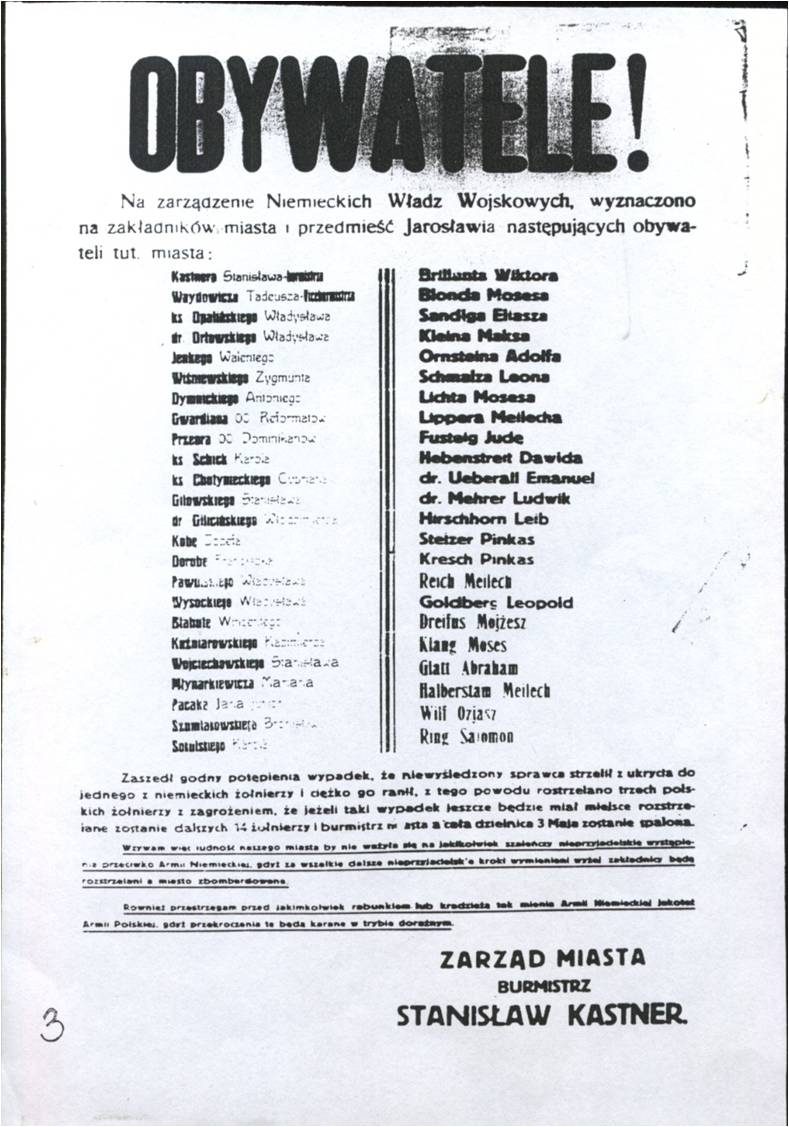
Hostages list of Jaroslaw 1939
