= Styhla =

Rural locality in Ternopil Oblast, Ukraine

Styhla Стигла
- Location in Ternopil Oblast
- Coordinates: 48°55′50″N 25°11′36″E
- Country: Ukraine
- Oblast: Ternopil Oblast
- Raion: Chortkiv Raion
- Hromada: Koropets settlement hromada
- Time zone: UTC+2 (EET)
  - Summer (DST): UTC+3 (EEST)
- Postal code: 48370

Styhla (Ukrainian: Стигла) is a village in Koropets settlement hromada, Chortkiv Raion, Ternopil Oblast, Ukraine.

Near the village there is a hydrological natural monument – the waterfall "Divochi sliozy".

== History ==
It was first mentioned in writings in 1493.

After the liquidation of the Monastyryska Raion on 19 July 2020, the village became part of the Chortkiv Raion.

== Sources ==
- (in Ukrainian) Мельничук Б., Стигла // Ternopil Encyclopedic Dictionary: in 4 v. / editorial board: H. Yavorskyi and other, Ternopil: "Zbruch", 2008, V. 3: П—Я, S. 354. — ISBN 978-966-528-279-2.
