= Władysław Koba =

Polish resistance fighter

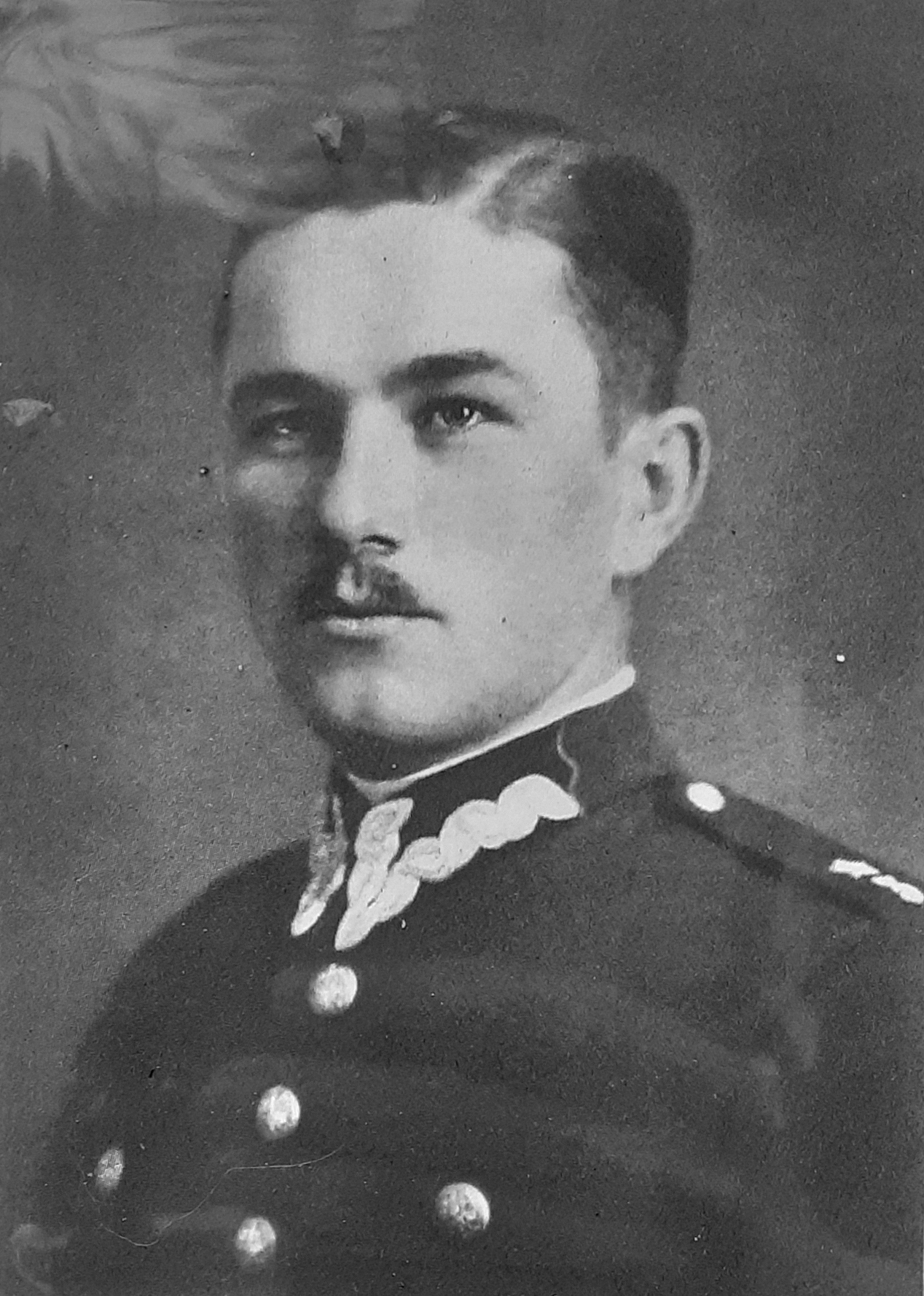
Wladyslaw Antoni Koba

Wladyslaw Antoni Koba (noms de guerre Marcin Gruda, Rak, Tor, Zyla) was a soldier of the Polish Army, Home Army and Freedom and Independence, who participated in the Polish September Campaign, in the activities of the Polish resistance movement in World War II as well as the Anti-communist resistance in Poland.

He was born on January 8, 1914, in Jarosław, in a middle-class, patriotic family. In 1932 Koba graduated from the Second High School in his native town, and soon afterwards he was accepted into the Infantry Officers School (Szkola Podchorazych Piechoty) in Komorowo near Warsaw. In 1938 Koba was promoted to First Lieutenant, and returned to serve in the Third Legions Infantry Regiment in Jarosław. As a soldier of this unit, he fought in the Polish September Campaign, in the area of Sieradz, then withdrew to the fortress of Modlin. After capitulation, Koba was transferred to a POW officers camp in Działdowo (Stalag II Soldau), but in late 1939 was released under condition that he would regularly report to the Wehrmacht's Ortskommando.

Koba settled in his hometown, but left it and hid in a village near Przeworsk, using the new name Marcin Gruda. He became a member of the Service for Poland's Victory (later Home Army), helping with training, also organizing different acts of sabotage and training young soldiers of the Polish resistance. In the summer of 1944, he took part in Operation Tempest and for his services, he was twice awarded the Cross of Valor (in 1939 and 1944) as well as Cross of the Home Army.

When the Red Army entered the area of Rzeszów, he was sought for by the NKVD and Polish security services. After dissolution of the Home Army (January 1945), Koba, who had been promoted to captain, entered the Freedom and Independence anticommunist armed organization, becoming commandant of the Przemyśl area. He was arrested on September 26, 1947, and put in the infamous prison, located in the Rzeszów Castle. On October 21, 1948, Koba was sentenced to death, which was confirmed by pro-Soviet, puppet president of Poland, Bolesław Bierut. Wladyslaw Koba was executed on January 31, 1949, at 20:30 in the Rzeszów Castle prison. His body was buried in a mass grave on the Zwieczyca Cemetery in Rzeszów. He had two children - daughter Marta and son Wojciech.

On February 5, 1992, Warsaw Military District Court voided the sentence. On May 3, 2008, Koba was posthumously awarded the Polonia Restituta, by President Lech Kaczyński.

== Sources ==
- Andrzej Zagórski: Małopolski słownik biograficzny uczestników działań niepodległościowych 1939-1956 tom 1. Kraków: Towarzystwo Sympatyków Historii, 1997. ISBN 83-904568-7-7.
- Grzegorz Ostasz: Zrzeszenie "Wolność i Niezawisłość" Okręg Rzeszów. Rzeszów: Wydawnictwo Libri Ressovienses, 2000. ISBN 83-87799-32-7.
- Jerzy Husar: Władysław Koba. Przyczynek do dziejów Zrzeszenia "Wolność i Niezawisłość" w Polsce południowo-wschodniej. Przemyśl: Południowo-Wschodni Instytut Naukowy w Przemyślu, 2001. ISBN 83-913511-4-9.
- Grzegorz Ostasz: Okręg Rzeszowski Zrzeszenia "Wolność i Niezawisłość". Model konspiracji, struktura, dzieje. Rzeszów: Oficyna Wydawnicza Politechniki Rzeszowskiej, 2006. ISBN 83-7199-403-6.
