= Sadove, Ternopil Oblast =

Rural locality in Ternopil Oblast, Ukraine

Sadove Садове
- Location in Ternopil Oblast
- Coordinates: 48°58′39″N 25°12′12″E
- Country: Ukraine
- Oblast: Ternopil Oblast
- Raion: Chortkiv Raion
- Hromada: Koropets settlement hromada
- Time zone: UTC+2 (EET)
  - Summer (DST): UTC+3 (EEST)
- Postal code: 48370

Sadove (Ukrainian: Садове) is a village in Koropets settlement hromada, Chortkiv Raion, Ternopil Oblast, Ukraine.

== History ==
It was first mentioned in writings in 1469.

After the liquidation of the Monastyryska Raion on 19 July 2020, the village became part of the Chortkiv Raion.

== Religion ==
- Church of the Nativity of the Blessed Virgin Mary (1912, brick, restored from a Roman Catholic church in 1991, UGCC).

== Sources ==
- (in Ukrainian) Грицина Д., Уніят В., Садове // Ternopil Encyclopedic Dictionary: in 4 v. / editorial board: H. Yavorskyi and other, Ternopil: "Zbruch", 2008, V. 3: П—Я, S. 221. — ISBN 978-966-528-279-2.
- "Nowosiółka Koropiecka (4)". Geographical Dictionary of the Kingdom of Poland (in Polish). 7. Warszawa: Kasa im. Józefa Mianowskiego. 1886. p. 277.
