= Verbka, Ternopil Oblast =

Rural locality in Ternopil Oblast, Ukraine

Verbka Вербка
- Location in Ternopil Oblast
- Coordinates: 48°59′15″N 25°8′53″E
- Country: Ukraine
- Oblast: Ternopil Oblast
- Raion: Chortkiv Raion
- Hromada: Koropets settlement hromada
- Time zone: UTC+2 (EET)
  - Summer (DST): UTC+3 (EEST)
- Postal code: 48305

Verbka (Ukrainian: Вербка) is a village in Koropets settlement hromada, Chortkiv Raion, Ternopil Oblast, Ukraine.

== History ==
In historical documents, the village was first mentioned on 25 February 1485.

After the liquidation of the Monastyryska Raion on 19 July 2020, the village became part of the Chortkiv Raion.

== Religion ==
A church belonging to two communities and having a double name: Resurrection (UGCC) and St. Demetrius (OCU) (1994, brick).

== Sources ==
- (in Ukrainian) Ониськів, М., Вербка // Ternopil Encyclopedic Dictionary: in 4 v. / editorial board: H. Yavorskyi and other, Ternopil: "Zbruch", 2004, V. 1: А—Й, S. 245—246. — ISBN 966-528-197-6.
