= Edmond Wilhelm Brillant =

Israeli naval architect

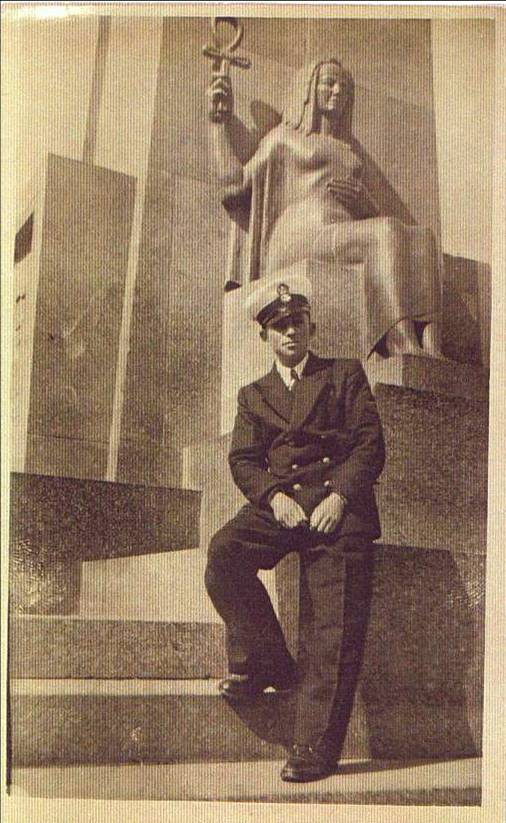
Edmond Wilhelm Brillant at Port Said, Egypt, in 1942

Edmond Wilhelm Brillant Halevi (Hebrew: אדמונד וילהלם ברילנט; 1916–2004) was a Polish-born Israeli naval architect and one of the founding fathers of the Israeli Navy.

== Biography ==
Edmond Wilhelm Brillant was born in Jaroslaw Galicia, Poland, and was the youngest of the four sons of the pharmacist Wiktor Brillant and his wife Laura Brillant (née Sturmlauf).

Brillant was a flight amateur and joined the gliding club of Jaroslaw at the age of 13. He studied building gliders, aircraft, gliding and flight there.

Brillant graduated from the August Witkowski Gymnasium (high school) in Jaroslaw in 1934 and started his MD studies. However, since he had a strong technical aptitude, Brillant started learning precision mechanics in Lviv. He immigrated to Mandatory Palestine in 1936 aboard the Polonia from the Port of Constanţa, settled in Haifa, and began studying at the Technion.

== Military service ==
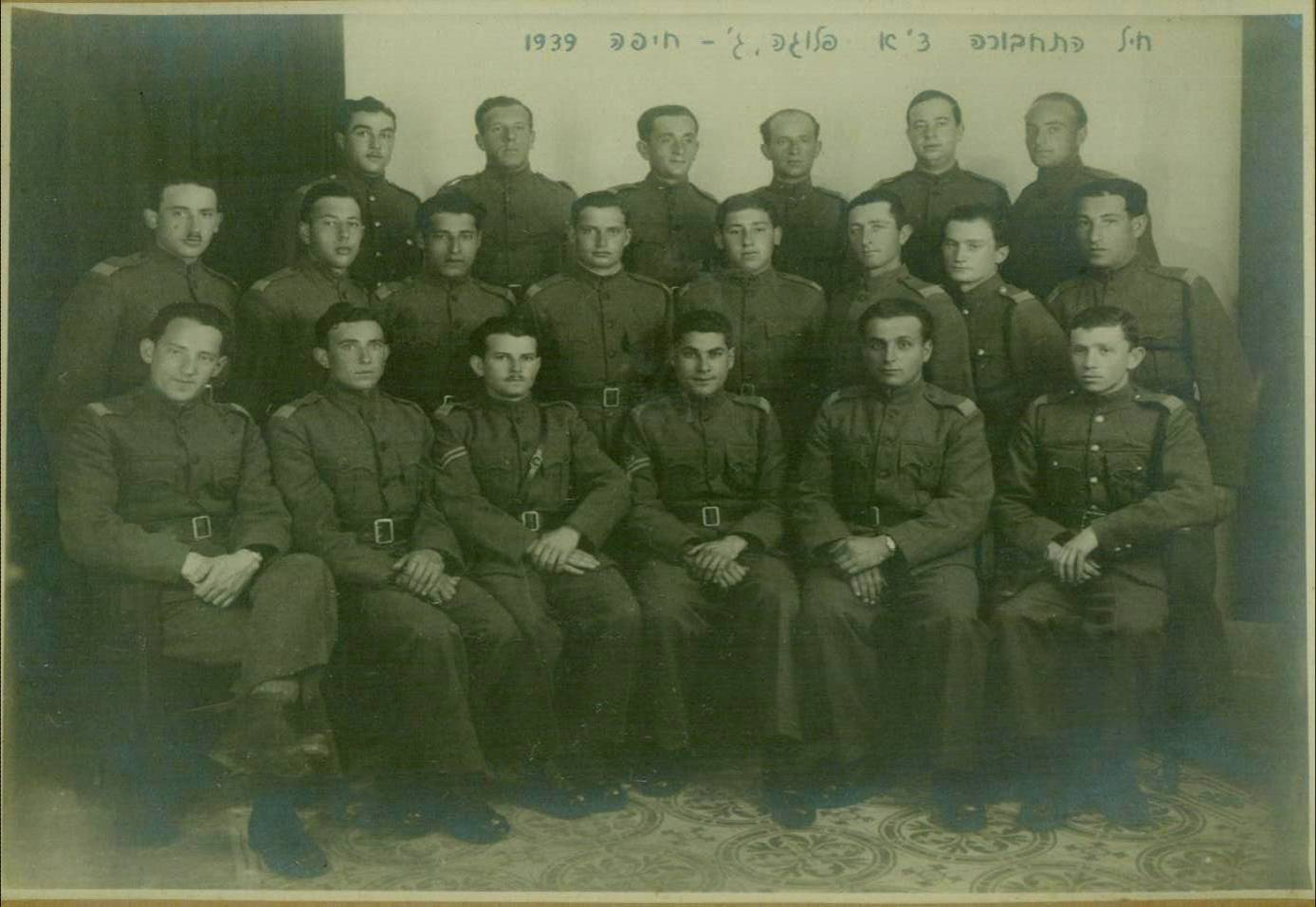
PPRD Railway Company C of Haifa, 1939 – Edmond Brillant is in the first row on the right, with a pistol

After immigrating to Palestine, Brillant joined the Haganah. He began studying mechanical engineering at the Technion, and in 1937 he joined the Haganah Flight Club in "Kfar Yeladim" at Jezreel Valley as an instructor. The Kfar Yeladim flight club was the early seed of the Haganah for creating an air arm which later became the Israeli Air Force under the guise of a gliding club. In 1938, he joined the Palestine Police Force, volunteering in the Palestine Police Railway Department (PPRD) of the Notrim, and escorted trains from Zemach at the Sea of Galilee to Port Said, Egypt. During service in the PPRD, he was wounded when his train was damaged by a mine placed by terrorists during the Arab rebellion of 1936-1939. He discharged himself from hospital and returned to his company.

As World War II started, Brillant wanted to volunteer to join the British Army but came down with typhoid fever and instead enlisted in the Royal Navy as a Chief Petty Officer in role of Engine Room Artificer (ERA) in 1942, serving until being discharged from the Royal Navy in March 1946.

Brillant served in the Red Sea Theater at HMS Massawa in Eritrea and other naval bases. Prior the takeover of Masawa by the Allies, the base was an Axis stronghold of the Regia Marina (the then Italian Navy). It was a bay which served as a harbor and shipyard with docking, thus was a strategic port for the Indian Ocean.

As the Italians started to retreat, they scuttled their ships. Salvage work was done by the United States Navy's Jewish Navy Officer, Commander Edward Ellsberg. His team was replaced later on by the Royal Navy. There, Brillant started to learn salvage work, shallow water diving, diesel engines and other naval professions that assisted him later on in his Israeli Navy career.

During Brillant's service in HMS Massawa he volunteered for pilot training. Brillant's commanding officers at HMS Massawa recommended him to be commissioned and assisted him in advancing to aviation training with Royal Navy's Fleet Air Arm (FAA) in 1944. His pilot duties were disallowed, since the Colonial Office did not allow access to aviation training for Jewish volunteers from Palestine. In his file, it was written that Brillant's engineering skills were of 'great importance' to the Royal Navy.

Even though Brillant was disqualified from Royal Navy pilot duties, he continued serving and did not answer the U.S. Navy's requests to join them as an officer.

During the war, Brillant lost his parents and a brother in the Holocaust.

After his discharge from the Royal Navy, he returned to the Haganah and joined the Israel Defense Forces (IDF) after Israeli independence, becoming an officer in the Israeli Navy.

=== Israeli Navy ===
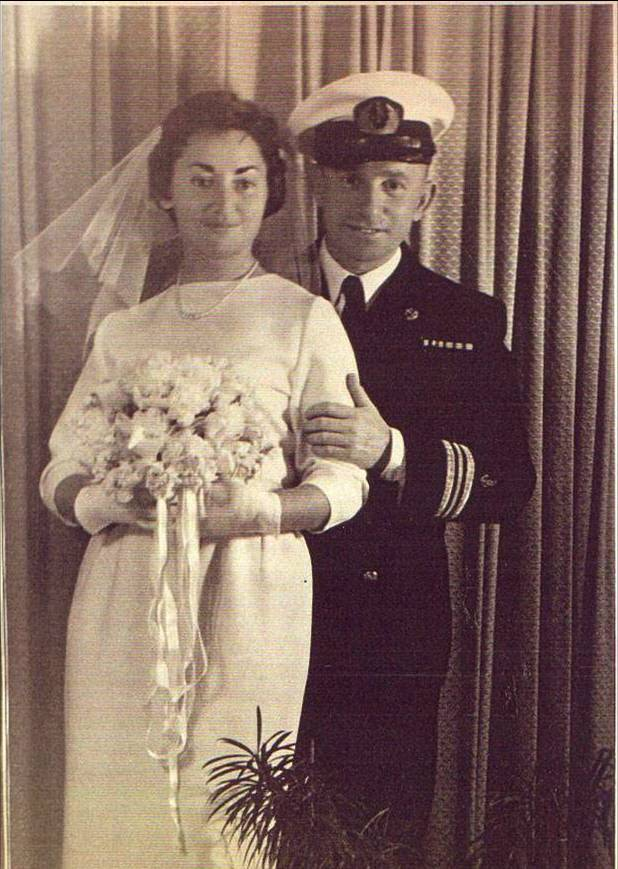
Edmond Brillant and his wife Rosita Segal

Brillant joined the Haganah Harbor Platoon, which later on became the Shayetet 13 Navy commando unit and took part in several of their operations. During this time, Brillant took part in converting the clandestine immigration ships of the Haganah into first improvised Israeli Navy ships for the War of Independence. This work was camouflaged since the British Mandate only left Haifa harbor in June 1948.

Brillant served in the Israeli Navy from its establishment. He founded the damage control branch and the special salvage unit and special under water operations called YALTAM. He established the damage control floating fighting, and firefighting training that each navy officer and sailor has to pass.

Brillant served as a naval staff officer, and during his service he was the operational planner of the 1956 sea battle in which the Egyptian destroyer Ibrahim el Awal was captured.

He analyzed the air attack and navy operation of both the French and Israelis, and his report was submitted to Lt General Moshe Dayan as well as the French military staff.

Brillant also improved the conversion time of reserve fishing boats to patrol boats from 3 days into few hours.

== ZIM Navigation Company ==
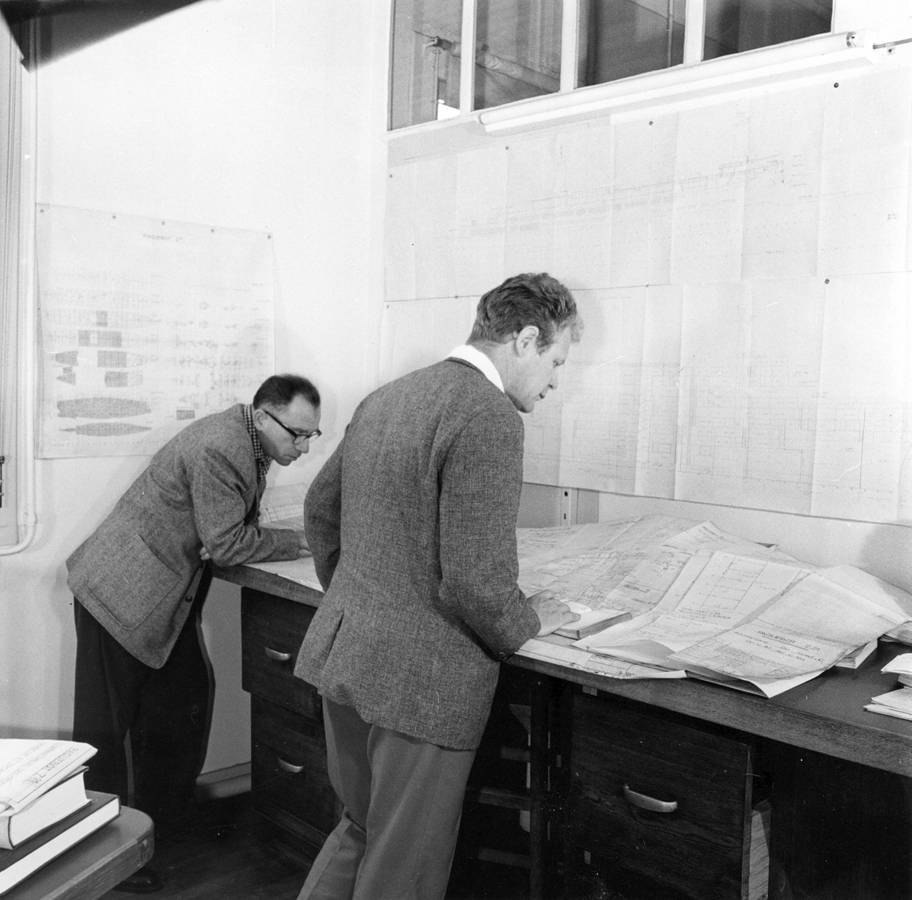
SS Shalom Project, Chantiers de l'Atlantique, 1963 – Edmond Brillant at the left

Brillant was borrowed from the Navy by ZIM in order to lead three projects of merchant marine ship building. He moved to France and led the SS Shalom project in Chantiers de l'Atlantique. This ship was the largest passenger ship of ZIM and was the flagship. After then, he moved to Toulon to manage the building of three freight ships: Keshet (Bow), Noga (Venus) and Mazal (Luck).

In 1963, Brillant asked the IDF attaché in Paris for permission to retire from the Navy, even though they requested him to continue his service for the vital naval operation known as the Cherbourg Project.

In 1969, while he was a technical superintendent in ZIM Europe lines, Brillant organised and led the logistic and technical effort behind the fueling of the 5 Sa'ar 3 class missile boats that escaped Cherbourg Harbour in operation Noah. The fuelling- freight ships that were modified by him were MV Lea to fuel in Gibraltar and MV Nahariyah as a backup in the Bay of Biscay.

== See also ==
- Naval Intelligence Division (Israel)
- Jezreel Valley railway
