= Konstanty Jacek Lubomirski =

Polish nobleman (1620–1663)

- Prince
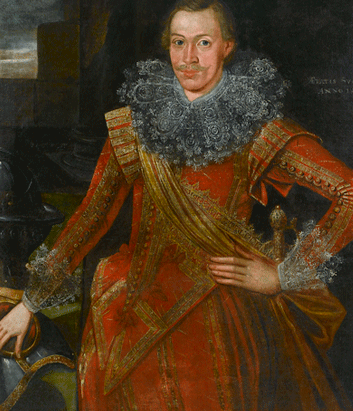

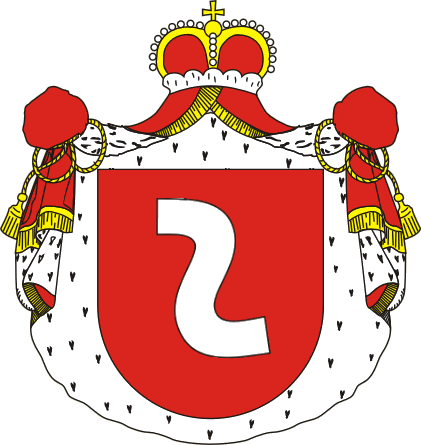
- Coat of arms: Lubomirski
- Born: 1620
- Died: 1663 (aged 42–43)
- Family: Lubomirski
- Consort: Barbara Domiciella Szczawińska
- Father: Stanisław Lubomirski
- Mother: Zofia Ostrogska

Prince Konstanty Jacek Lubomirski (1620–1663) was a Polish nobleman (szlachcic).

Konstanty was owner of Jarosław estates. He was Krajczy of the Crown and Podczaszy of the Crown since 1658 and starost of Sącz. He died childless.
