= Svitle, Ternopil Oblast =

Rural locality in Ternopil Oblast, Ukraine

Svitle Світле
- Location in Ternopil Oblast
- Coordinates: 48°56′40″N 25°13′34″E
- Country: Ukraine
- Oblast: Ternopil Oblast
- Raion: Chortkiv Raion
- Hromada: Koropets settlement hromada
- Time zone: UTC+2 (EET)
  - Summer (DST): UTC+3 (EEST)
- Postal code: 48370

Svitle (Ukrainian: Світле) is a village in Koropets settlement hromada, Chortkiv Raion, Ternopil Oblast, Ukraine.

== History ==
It was first mentioned in writings in 1493.

After the liquidation of the Monastyryska Raion on 19 July 2020, the village became part of the Chortkiv Raion.

== Religion ==
- House of Prayer of Christians of the Evangelical Faith.

== Sources ==
- (in Ukrainian) Новосядла Н., Уніят В., Світле // Ternopil Encyclopedic Dictionary: in 4 v. / editorial board: H. Yavorskyi and other, Ternopil: "Zbruch", 2008, V. 3: П—Я, S. 237. — ISBN 978-966-528-279-2.
