= Racibórz Conflict =

1945 conflict between Czechoslovakia and Poland

- Part of the Polish–Czechoslovak border conflicts
Date	10–20 June 1945
Location	Kłodzko and Racibórz County
Result	Stalemate: Czechoslovak troops retreat; Czechoslovak armored train remains in Ścinawka Średnia until 20th June

Belligerents
Czechoslovakia	Poland

Commanders and leaders
Bohumil Boček; Vladimír Janko	Michał Rola-Żymierski

Casualties and losses
None	Possibly 1 killed

Racibórz Conflict was a border conflict between Czechoslovakia and Poland that almost resulted in a military conflict between both countries.

== Background ==
Border conflicts between Poland and Czechoslovakia began in 1918 between the Second Polish Republic and First Czechoslovak Republic, both freshly created states. The conflicts centered on the disputed areas of Cieszyn Silesia, Orava Territory and Spiš.

After World War II they broadened to include areas around the cities of Kłodzko and Racibórz, which until 1945 had belonged to Germany. Czechoslovakia believed that these territories should become part of Czechoslovakia as it was historically part of Czech lands and there was a strong Czech minority. According to international agreements these territories were to become part of Poland.

== Conflict ==
Conflict started on 10 June 1945 when Deputy Chief of the General Staff Bohumil Boček ordered 1 Czechoslovak tank brigade to advance into Racibórz area. Czechoslovak units were ordered to avoid direct conflict with Polish troops. Czechoslovak soldiers occupied 14 towns and ceased their advance 5 kilometres from Racibórz. There were no larger military incidents. Only in Bieńkowice two policemen were disarmed by Czechoslovak soldiers. According to Polish sources 1 Polish army officer was killed during the operation.

On 12 June 1945 Polish side sent protest note to Czechoslovak embassy and demanded reatreat of Czechoslovak units giving 48 hour ultimatum. Larger Polish units were sent to the area by order of Minister of National Defence Rola-Żymierski. Polish units were ordered to disarm and transport Czechoslovak units to the border if they refuse to reatreat. Soviet Union decided to interfere diplomatically to avoid direct military confrontation between both countries and mediated negotiations. On 15 June 1945 Czechoslovak units retreated from Kłodzko and Racibórz but armed train was sent from Broumov to Ścinawka Średnia where it remained until 20 June 1945.

== Aftermath ==
Poland was preparing to send troops to Zaolzie areas held by Czechoslovakia but were ordered by Soviet side to drop the plans. Situation on Polish-Czechoslovak border was still tense. On 28 June 1945 Czechoslovak units were shooting at Polish soldiers in Sněžník which was called an incident.

On 10 March 1947, a treaty of friendship and mutual assistance was signed between Czechoslovakia and Poland. This treaty calmed the situation, but mutual tensions persisted.

On 13 June 1958, in Warsaw, the two countries signed a treaty confirming the border at the line of 1 January 1938 (that is, returning to the situation before the Nazi-imposed Munich Agreement transferred territory from Czechoslovakia to Poland), and since then there have been no conflicts regarding this matter.
