= Ozjasz Storch =

Polish soldier

- Born: 1913; Jarosław, Poland
- Died: 25 November 1938 near Čadca, Czechoslovakia
- Military career
- Allegiance: (Poland) Polish Armed Forces
- Branch: Polish Armed Forces
- Rank: Rifleman
- Unit: 1st Podhale Rifles Regiment
- Conflicts: Battle of Čadca
- Awards: Cross of Merit for Bravery

Ozjasz Storch (born 1913 in Jarosław, died November 25, 1938 near Čadca) was a Polish Jew, civil servant, and reserve soldier of the Polish Armed Forces, who was killed during the occupation of the area around Čadca, annexed by Poland together with the so-called Zaolzie in 1938.

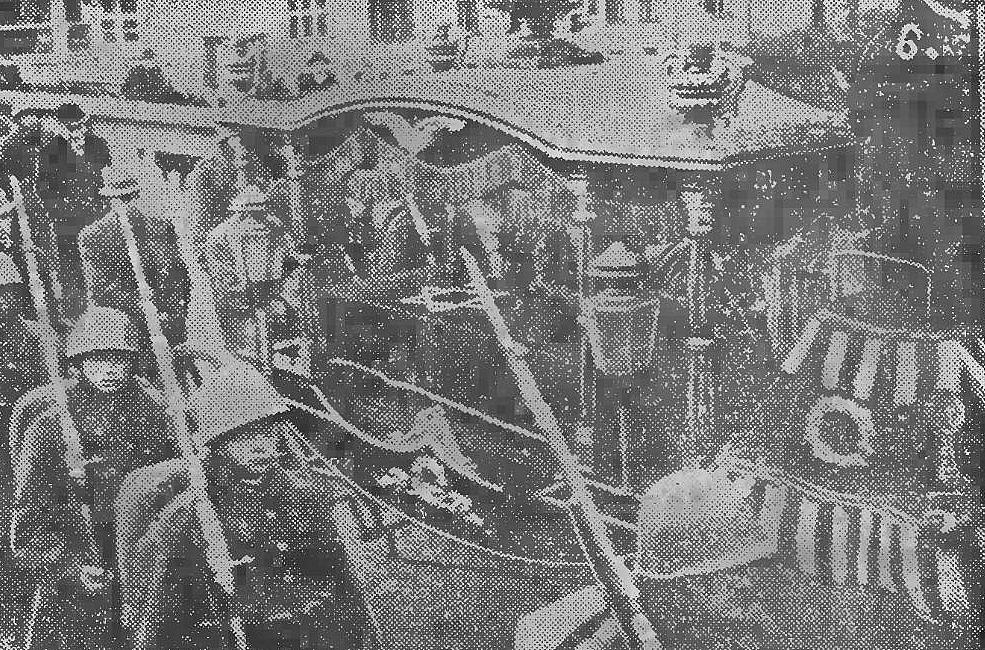
Funeral of Ozjasz Storch in Cieszyn

Funeral of Ozjasz Storch in Cieszyn

== Biography ==
Storch was born in 1913 in Jarosław. He had two brothers, one of whom was expelled from the German Reich shortly before Ozjasz's death. During the 1930s he lived in Nowy Sącz, where he worked as a civil servant. He was a member of Betar. He planned to emigrate from Poland to Uruguay, where his wife was waiting for him in Montevideo, but before leaving he reported for military service as a reservist.

On November 25, 1938, as a reserve rifleman of the 1st Podhale Rifles Regiment, he was killed during a skirmish between the Independent Operational Group Silesia of General Władysław Bortnowski and Czechoslovak forces during the occupation of the area around Čadca, connected with the annexation of Zaolzie. The other soldier killed was Stanisław Mlekodaj.

Storch's body was taken to a hospital in Cieszyn, where, following a ceremonial funeral that took the form of a public demonstration, including a procession across the bridge over the Olza, he was buried on November 28, 1938, in the New Jewish Cemetery in Cieszyn. The funeral was conducted by rabbi Aron Eisenstein, and among those attending were General Władysław Bortnowski, Colonel Józef Kustroń, Colonel Stefan Szlaszewski, Colonel Mikołaj Bołtuć, Deputy Voivode of Katowice Dr. Tadeusz Saloni, Mayor of Cieszyn Rudolf Halfar, and Dr. Dawid Sandhaus, president of the Jewish community in Cieszyn.

Storch was posthumously promoted to the rank of corporal, and on November 26, 1938, the prime minister posthumously awarded him the Cross of Merit for Bravery "for acts of bravery and courage in defence of the borders of the State." During the funeral, General Bortnowski decorated the coffin with this distinction. According to an account of the funeral, however, the general decorated the coffin with the Cross of Valour.

His death and funeral received extensive coverage in the contemporary press and were used for propaganda purposes to portray harmonious coexistence between the nationalities inhabiting the Republic of Poland as Storch was killed alongside a soldier who was ethnically Polish. In connection with this death, the death of a Jewish soldier of the Polish Army, and the killing of the Jewish student Karol Zellermayer the day before, columnist Apolinary Hartglas, writing in Nowy Dziennik, addressed the question of equality in sacrifice for Poland by Polish and Jewish soldiers and wrote: "na polu ofiar dla Polski istnieje nadal dla Żydów numerus non clausus" ("in the field of sacrifice for Poland, the numerus non clausus still exists for Jews"). Columnist B.W. Święcicki wrote about the significance of the two deaths, of a Pole and a Jew, in Przegląd Powszechny.

At the beginning of 1939, at a meeting of the executive board of the Union of Veterans, it was decided to fund a monument to Ozjasz Storch on the Polish-Czech border.
