= Koropets settlement hromada =

Hromada in Ternopil Oblast, Ukraine

Koropets settlement hromada Коропецька селищна громада
- hromada
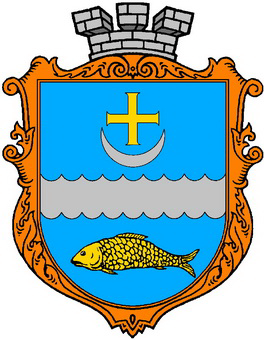
- Seal

- Location within Ternopil Oblast Location within Ukraine
- Coordinates: 48°56′19″N 25°10′46″E
- Country: Ukraine
- Oblast: Ternopil Oblast
- Raion: Chortkiv Raion
- Administrative center: Koropets

Government
  - Hromada head: Mykola Tymkiv

Area
  - Total: 85.9 km^{2} (33.2 sq mi)

Population (2022)
  - Total: 5,872
- Urban-type settlement: 1
- Villages: 7
- Website: koropecka-rada.gov.ua

Koropets settlement hromada (Ukrainian: Коропецька селищна територіальна громада, romanized: Koropetska selyshchna terytorialna hromada is a hromada in Ukraine, in Chortkiv Raion of Ternopil Oblast. The administrative center is the urban-type settlement of Koropets. Its population is 5,872 (2022 estimate)

== History ==
It was formed on 29 July 2015 by amalgamation of Koropets village council, Verbka and Sadove village councils of Monastyrysk Raion.

== Settlements ==
The hromada consists of 1 urban-type settlement (Koropets) and 7 villages:

- Verbka
- Vistria
- Horyhliady
- Dibrova
- Sadove
- Svitle
- Styhla
