= Jerzy Hordyński =

Polish poet and writer

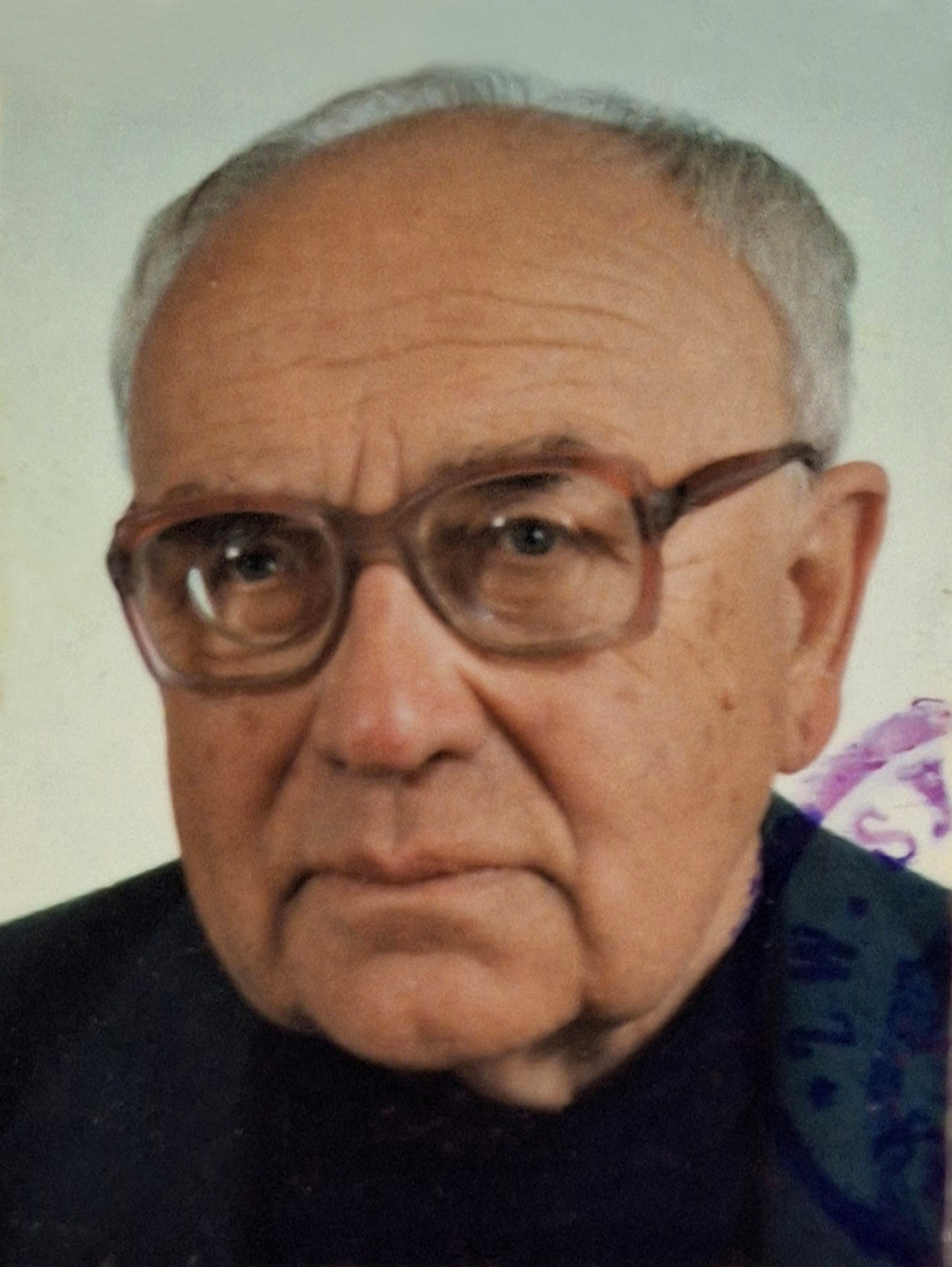
Image of Jerzy Hordyński

Jerzy Hordyński (18 October 1919 — 14 June 1998) was a Polish poet and writer.

== Biography ==
Hordyński was born on October 18, 1919 in Jarosław to Julian Antonowicz-Hordyński and Helena Steinbach.

In the 1930s, he studied law, oriental studies, and Polish philology at the Jan Kazimierz University in Lwów. He published his poem in 1935 in a local youth magazine. When the city fell under Soviet occupation in September of 1941, he returned to his studies. During the German occupation (1941–1944) he published his poems in underground anthologies and illegal papers, and continued his studies at a secret university. He worked as a feeder of lice in Rudolf Weigl's Institute of Typhus Studies, like another famous Polish poet, Zbigniew Herbert.

After Lwów was reoccupied by the Soviets in July 1944, he was arrested and sentenced to a gulag in Donbas for five years. He was released after three years and moved to Kraków, where he finished his degree at the Jagiellonian University. In Kraków he wrote for the Tygodnik Powszechny. His first official volume of poetry, Return to the light was published in 1951. In 1956 he joined the editorial board of "Życie Literackie" where he, together with Wisława Szymborska, ran a column entitled "literary mail". In 1961, due to health problems he moved to first Vienna and later Paris (where he studied at the Sorbonne), before finally settling in Rome in 1964. From there he sent in his writings to "Życie Literackie" and "Przekroj". He was awarded various international awards, with his works translated into many languages.

He died on June 14, 1998 in Rome.
