= Mieczysław Kasprzak =

Polish politician

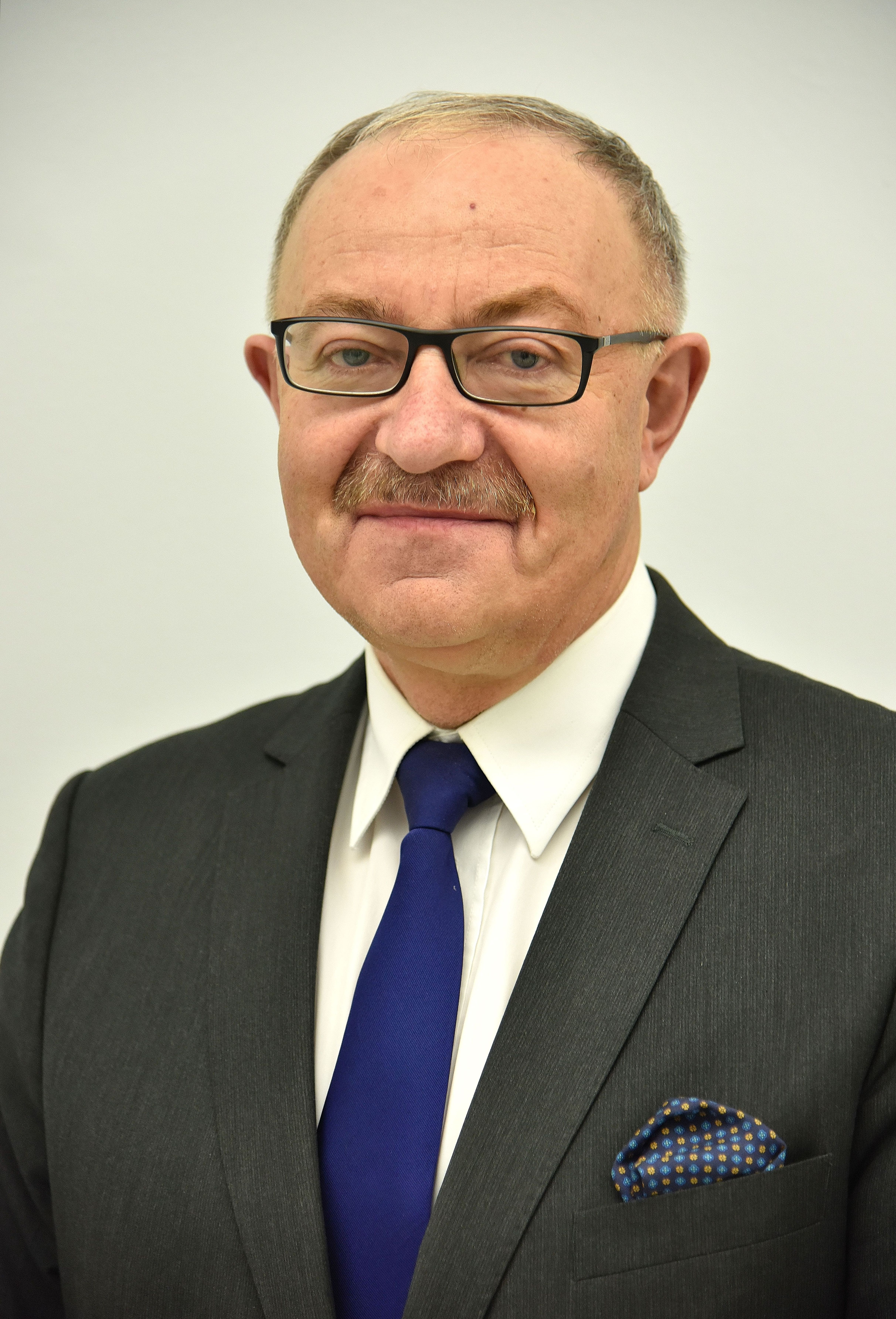

member of Sejm 2005-2007
- In office 25 September 2005 – ?

Personal details
- Born: 30 March 1953 (age 73) Ostrów
- Party: Polish People's Party

Mieczysław Kasprzak (born 30 March 1953 in Ostrów) is a Polish politician. He was elected to Sejm on 25 September 2005, getting 7795 votes in 22 Krosno district as a candidate from the Polish People's Party list.

He was also a member of Sejm 1993-1997 and Sejm 2001-2005.

== See also ==
- Members of Polish Sejm 2005-2007
