= Vistria =

Rural locality in Ternopil Oblast, Ukraine

Vistria Вістря
- Village
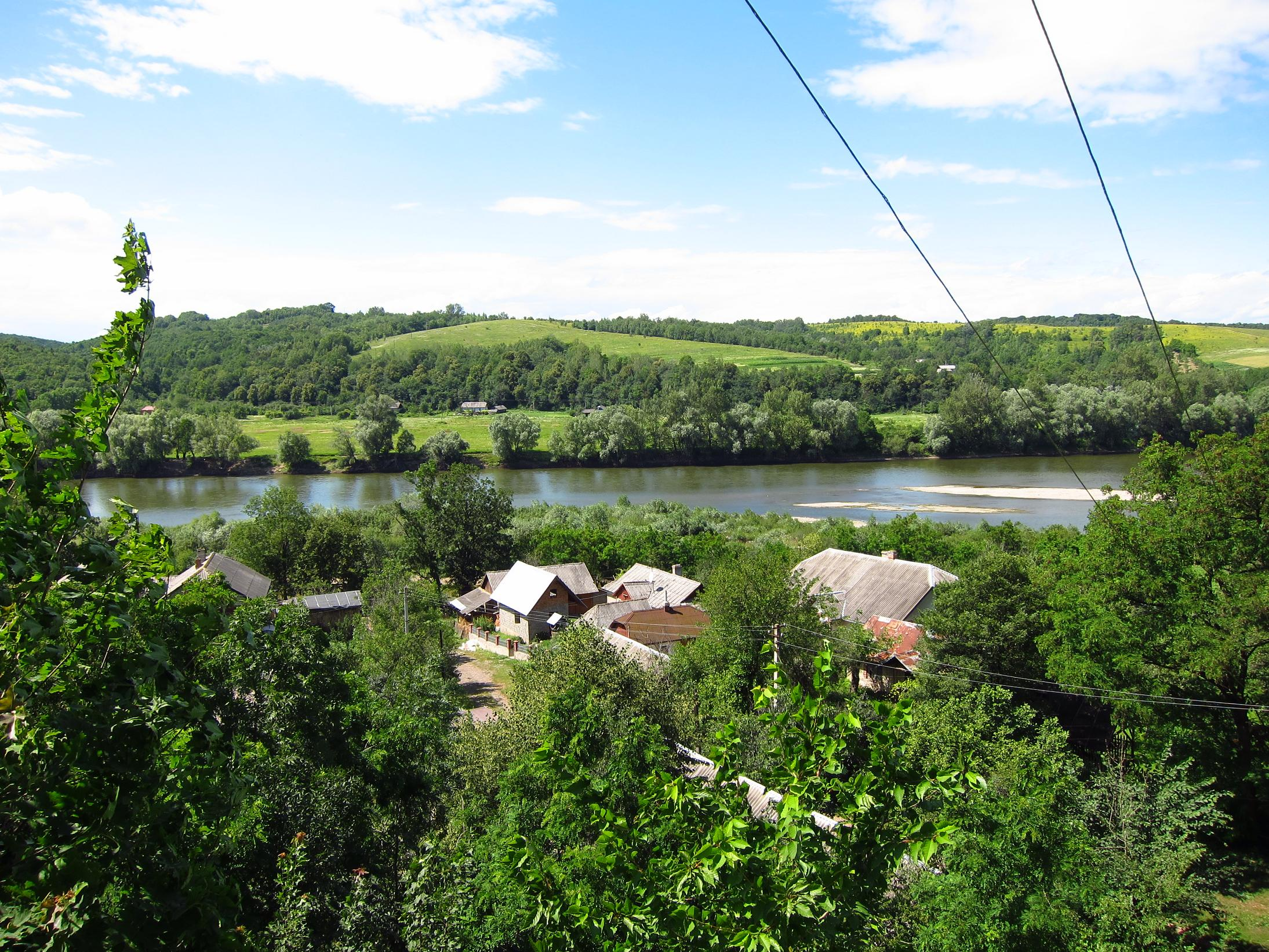
- Village in Vistria

- Location in Ternopil Oblast
- Coordinates: 48°55′29″N 25°7′52″E
- Country: Ukraine
- Oblast: Ternopil Oblast
- Raion: Chortkiv Raion
- Hromada: Koropets settlement hromada
- Time zone: UTC+2 (EET)
  - Summer (DST): UTC+3 (EEST)
- Postal code: 48371

Vistria (Ukrainian: Вістря) is a village in Koropets settlement hromada, Chortkiv Raion, Ternopil Oblast, Ukraine.

== History ==
The first written mention of the village dates back to 1485.

== Religion ==
There are two churches: Church of the Resurrection (UGCC, 1754, wooden) and a new one (2007, brick).
