= Ostrów, Jarosław County =

Ostrów
- Village
- Location within Poland
- Coordinates: 49°58′10″N 22°47′6″E
- Country: Poland
- Voivodeship: Subcarpathian
- County: Jarosław
- Gmina: Radymno
- Population: 1,800

Ostrów [ˈɔstruf] is a village in the administrative district of Gmina Radymno, within Jarosław County, Subcarpathian Voivodeship, in south-eastern Poland, close to the border with Ukraine.
