= Stanisław Marcin Badeni =

Polish politician (1850–1912)

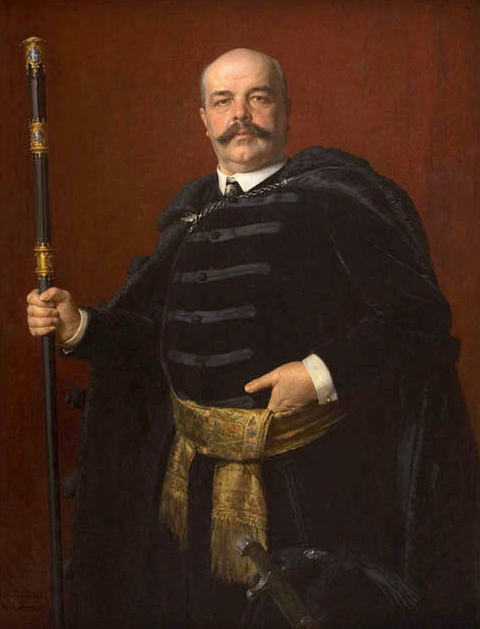
Stanisław Badeni

Stanisław h. Badeni (1850–1912) was a conservative Polish politician and a statesman of Austro-Hungarian Galicia. Born on 7 September 1850 in Surochów near Jarosław, in 1883 he was elected to the Galician Sejm. In 1895, he was chosen as the Land Marshal of Galicia (a de facto prime minister) and held that post until replaced by Andrzej Kazimierz Potocki in 1901. After the latter had been murdered in 1903, Badeni returned to the office and held it until his death in 1912. Among his greatest achievements was the successful recovery of the Wawel Castle from the Austrian authorities, which used it as military barracks. From 1891 until his death, he was also a member of the Austro-Hungarian Imperial Council.

== See also ==
- Kazimierz Feliks Badeni
