= Kovalivka =

Kovalivka (Ukrainian: Ковалівка) may refer to several places in Ukraine:

== Cherkasy Oblast ==
- Kovalivka, Cherkasy Oblast, village in Zolotonosha Raion

== Dnipropetrovsk Oblast ==
- Kovalivka, Dnipropetrovsk Oblast, village in Kamianske Raion

== Khmelnytskyi Oblast ==
- Kovalivka, Khmelnytskyi Oblast, village in Khmelnytskyi Raion

== Kirovohrad Oblast ==
- Kovalivka, Holovanivsk Raion, Kirovohrad Oblast, village in Holovanivsk Raion
- Kovalivka, Marianivska rural hromada, Novoukrainka Raion, Kirovohrad Oblast, village in Marianivska rural hromada, Novoukrainka Raion
- Kovalivka, Rivne rural hromada, Novoukrainka Raion, Kirovohrad Oblast, village in Rivne rural hromada, Novoukrainka Raion

== Kharkiv Oblast ==
- Kovalivka, Bohodukhiv Raion, Kharkiv Oblast, village in Bohodukhiv Raion
- Kovalivka, Izium Raion, Kharkiv Oblast, village in Izium Raion
- Kovalivka, Kupiansk Raion, Kharkiv Oblast, village in Kupiansk Raion

== Kyiv Oblast ==
- Kovalivka, Bila Tserkva Raion, Kyiv Oblast, village in Bila Tskerkva Raion
- Kovalivka, Vyshhorod Raion, Kyiv Oblast, village in Vyshhorod Raion

== Luhansk Oblast ==
- Kovalivka, Luhansk Oblast, village in Svatove Raion

== Mykolaiv Oblast ==
- Kovalivka, Mykolaiv Raion, Mykolaiv Oblast, village in Mykolaiv Raion
- Kovalivka, Pervomaisk Raion, Mykolaiv Oblast, village in Pervomaisk Raion
- Kovalivka, Voznesensk Raion, Mykolaiv Oblast, village in Voznesensk Raion

== Odesa Oblast ==
- Kovalivka, Odesa Oblast, village in Odesa Raion

== Poltava Oblast ==
- Kovalivka, Kremenchuk Raion, Poltava Oblast, village in Kremenchuk Raion
- Kovalivka, Myrhorod Raion, Poltava Oblast, village in Myrhorod Raion
- Kovalivka, Poltava Raion, Poltava Oblast, village in Poltava Raion

== Ternopil Oblast ==
- Kovalivka, Ternopil Oblast, village in Chortkiv Raion

== Vinnytsia Oblast ==
- Kovalivka, Vinnytsia Oblast, village in Haisyn Raion

== Zhytomyr Oblast ==
- Kovalivka, Zhytomyr Oblast, village in Korosten Raion

== See also ==
- Kovalyovka
- Kovalyovka, Volgograd Oblast
