= Pidlisne =

Pidlisne may refer to the following locations:

- Pidlisne, Chortkiv Raion, Ternopil Oblast
- Pidlisne, Kremenets Raion, Ternopil Oblast
- Pidlisne, Luhansk Oblast
- Pidlisne, Kirovohrad Oblast, formerly Fedvar
- Pidlisne, Kherson Oblast
- Pidlisne, Mohyliv-Podilskyi Raion, Vinnytsia Oblast
- Pidlisne, Haisyn Raion, Vinnytsia Oblast
- Pidlisne, Derazhnia Raion
- Pidlisne was the former name (from 1946 to 1995) of Yordaneshty, a village in Chernivtsi Raion, Chernivtsi Oblast, Ukraine.

== See also ==
- Podlesnoye
