= Lazarivka, Ternopil Oblast =

Rural locality in Ternopil Oblast, Ukraine

Lazarivka Лазарівка
- Location in Ternopil Oblast
- Coordinates: 49°2′19″N 25°3′44″E
- Country: Ukraine
- Oblast: Ternopil Oblast
- Raion: Chortkiv Raion
- Hromada: Monastyryska urban hromada
- Time zone: UTC+2 (EET)
  - Summer (DST): UTC+3 (EEST)
- Postal code: 48340

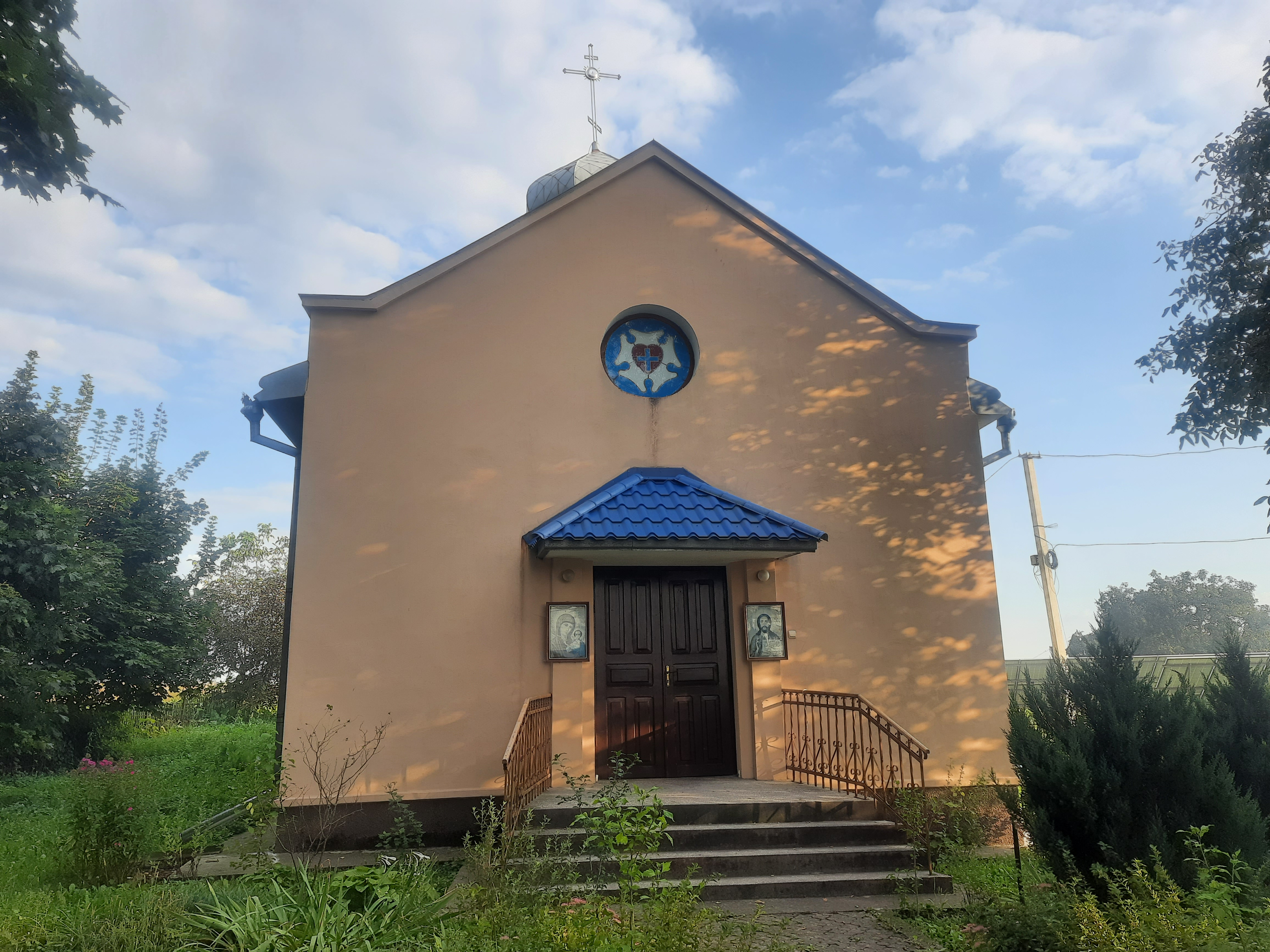
The Evangelical Lutheran Church of the Presentation of the Lord in Lazarivka

Lazarivka (Ukrainian: Лазарівка) is a village in Monastyryska urban hromada, Chortkiv Raion, Ternopil Oblast, Ukraine.

== History ==
It was first mentioned in writings in 1578.

After the liquidation of the Monastyryska Raion on 19 July 2020, the village became part of the Chortkiv Raion.

== Religion ==
- Two churches of St. Nicholas (1667–1669, wooden; 2014, brick),
- Lutheran Church (1998).

== Sources ==
- (in Ukrainian) Броніцький М., Мельничук Б., Лазарівка // Ternopil Encyclopedic Dictionary: in 4 v. / editorial board: H. Yavorskyi and other, Ternopil: "Zbruch", 2005, V. 2: К—О, S. 313. — ISBN 966-528-199-2.
- "Łazarówka 1.), pow. buczacki". Geographical Dictionary of the Kingdom of Poland (in Polish). 5. Warszawa: Kasa im. Józefa Mianowskiego. 1884. p. 617.
- "Suchodół 3.) folwark i grupa domów w Łazarówce, pow. buczacki". Geographical Dictionary of the Kingdom of Poland (in Polish). 11. Warszawa: Kasa im. Józefa Mianowskiego. 1890. p. 536.
