= Bobrivnyky =

Rural locality in Ternopil Oblast, Ukraine

Bobrivnyky Бобрівники
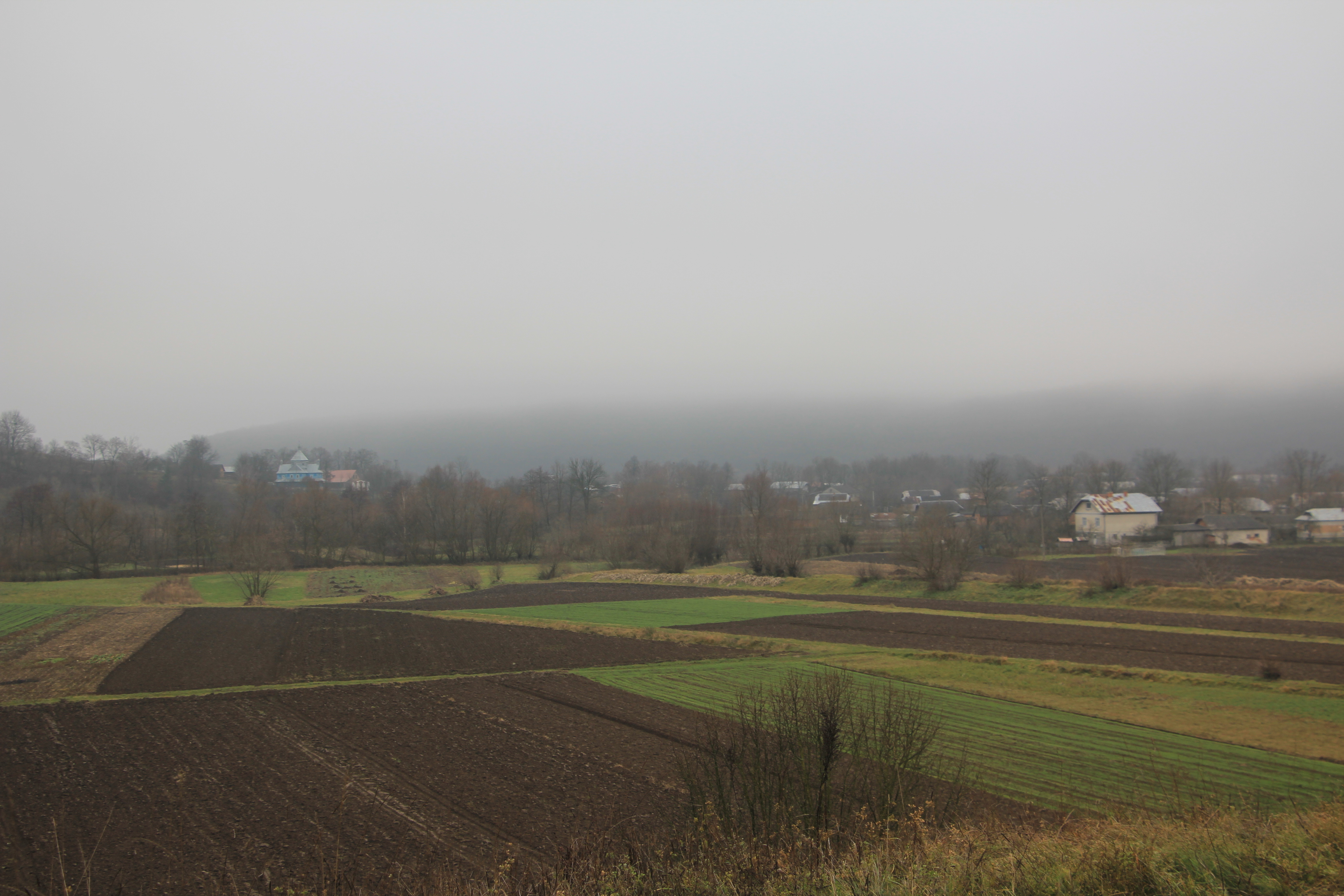
- Panorama of Bobrivyky

- Location in Ternopil Oblast
- Coordinates: 49°0′1″N 25°4′6″E
- Country: Ukraine
- Oblast: Ternopil Oblast
- Raion: Chortkiv Raion
- Hromada: Monastyryska urban hromada
- Time zone: UTC+2 (EET)
  - Summer (DST): UTC+3 (EEST)
- Postal code: 48343

Bobrivnyky (Ukrainian: Бобрівники) is a village in Monastyryska urban hromada, Chortkiv Raion, Ternopil Oblast, Ukraine.

== History ==
It was first mentioned in writings in 1454.

After the liquidation of the Monastyryska Raion on 19 July 2020, the village became part of the Chortkiv Raion.

== Religion ==
- Church of the Exaltation of the Holy Cross (1890, wooden, UGCC).

== Sources ==
- (in Ukrainian) Грицина Д., Уніят В., Бобрівники // Ternopil Encyclopedic Dictionary: in 4 v. / editorial board: H. Yavorskyi and other, Ternopil: "Zbruch", 2004, V. 1: А—Й, S. 146—147. — ISBN 966-528-197-6.
- "Bobrowniki, pow. tłumacki, nad Złotą Lipą". Geographical Dictionary of the Kingdom of Poland (in Polish). 1. Warszawa: Kasa im. Józefa Mianowskiego. 1880. p. 265.
