= Bertnyky =

Rural locality in Ternopil Oblast, Ukraine

Bertnyky Бертники
- Location in Ternopil Oblast
- Coordinates: 49°4′21″N 25°13′21″E
- Country: Ukraine
- Oblast: Ternopil Oblast
- Raion: Chortkiv Raion
- Hromada: Monastyryska urban hromada
- Time zone: UTC+2 (EET)
  - Summer (DST): UTC+3 (EEST)
- Postal code: 48324

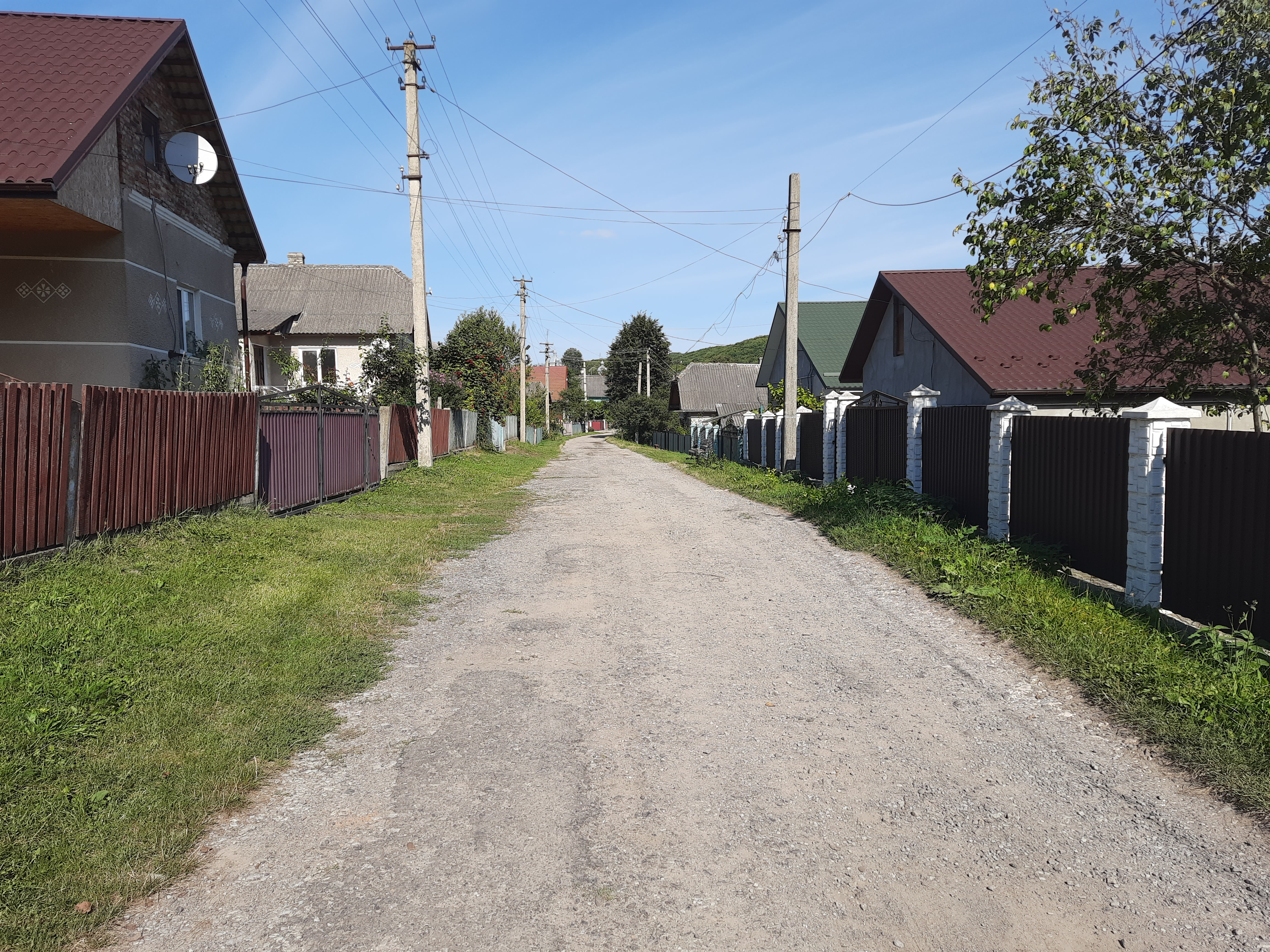

Bertnyky (Ukrainian: Бертники; Polish: Bertniki) is a village in Monastyryska urban hromada, Chortkiv Raion, Ternopil Oblast, Ukraine.

== History ==
It was first mentioned in writings in 1444.

After the liquidation of the Monastyryska Raion on 19 July 2020, the village became part of the Chortkiv Raion.

== Religion ==
- St. Michael's church (1928, brick).

== Sources ==
- (in Ukrainian) Грицина Д., Уніят В., Бертники // Ternopil Encyclopedic Dictionary: in 4 v. / editorial board: H. Yavorskyi and other, Ternopil: "Zbruch", 2004, V. 1: А—Й, S. 116. — ISBN 966-528-197-6.
- "Bertniki". Geographical Dictionary of the Kingdom of Poland (in Polish). 1. Warszawa: Kasa im. Józefa Mianowskiego. 1880. p. 154.
