= Yarhoriv =

Rural locality in Ternopil Oblast, Ukraine

Yarhoriv Яргорів
- Location in Ternopil Oblast
- Coordinates: 49°5′50″N 25°2′26″E
- Country: Ukraine
- Oblast: Ternopil Oblast
- Raion: Chortkiv Raion
- Hromada: Monastyryska urban hromada
- Time zone: UTC+2 (EET)
  - Summer (DST): UTC+3 (EEST)
- Postal code: 48331

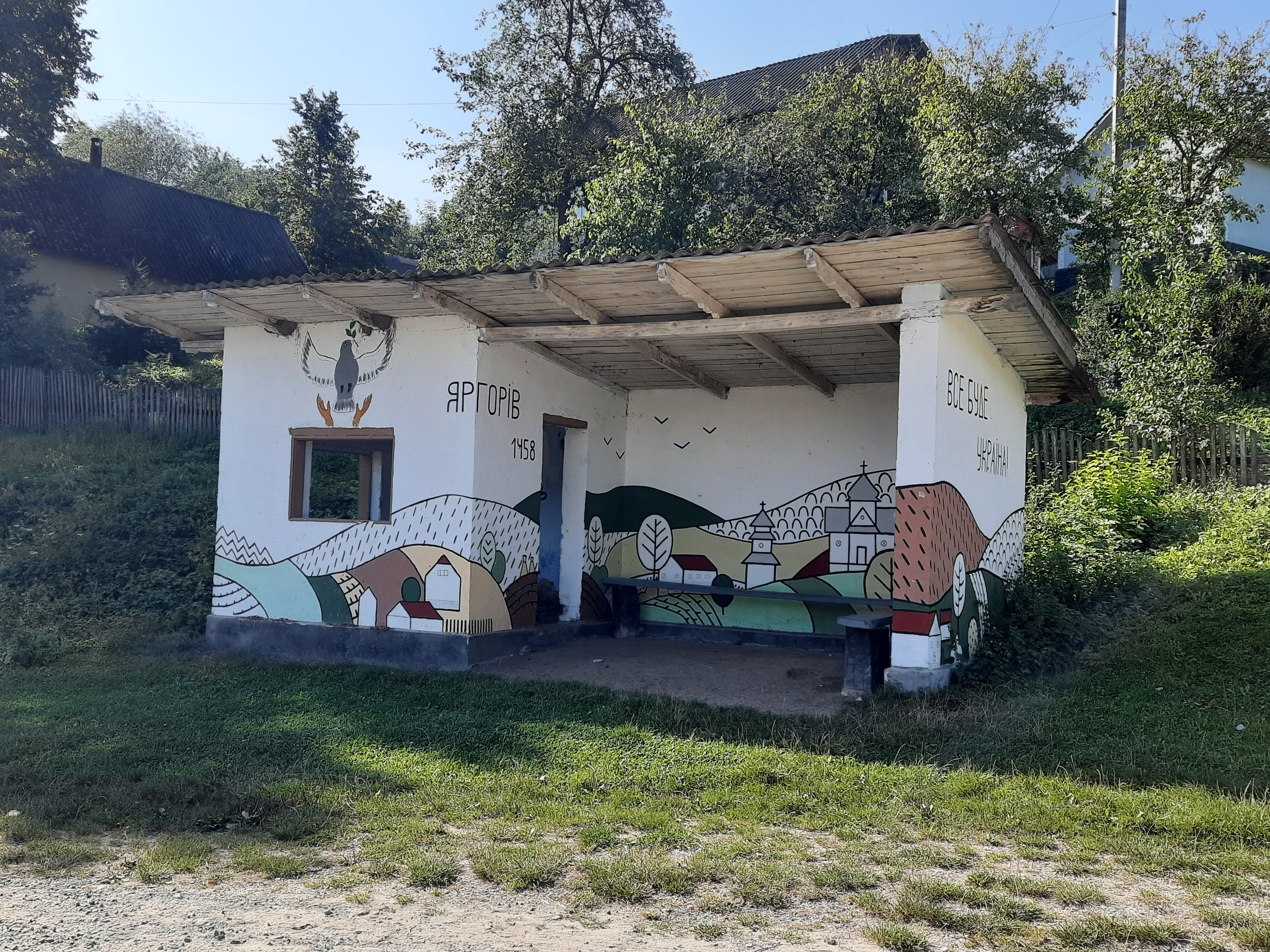
Bus stop in the village of Yarhoriv, Chortkiv district, Ternopil region.

Yarhoriv (Ukrainian: Яргорів) is a village in Monastyryska urban hromada, Chortkiv Raion, Ternopil Oblast, Ukraine.

== History ==
It was first mentioned in writings in 1458.

After the liquidation of the Monastyryska Raion on 19 July 2020, the village became part of the Chortkiv Raion.

== Religion ==
- Church of the Assumption (1927).

== Sources ==
- (in Ukrainian) Черемшинський О., Яргорів // Ternopil Encyclopedic Dictionary: in 4 v. / editorial board: H. Yavorskyi and other, Ternopil: "Zbruch", 2008, V. 3: П—Я, S. 688. — ISBN 978-966-528-279-2.
- "Jarchorów, pow. buczacki". Geographical Dictionary of the Kingdom of Poland (in Polish). 3. Warszawa: Kasa im. Józefa Mianowskiego. 1882. p. 447.
