= Hranitne =

Hranitne (Ukrainian: Гранітне) is an inhabited locality in Ukraine and it may stand for:

== Rural settlements ==
- Hranitne, Kamianske Raion, Dnipropetrovsk Oblast
- Hranitne, Kryvyi Rih Raion, Dnipropetrovsk Oblast
- Hranitne, Mariupol Raion, Donetsk Oblast
- Hranitne, Zhytomyr Oblast

== Villages ==
- Hranitne, Volnovakha Raion, Donetsk Oblast
- Hranitne, Rivne Oblast
- Hranitne, Ternopil Oblast
- Hranitne, Vinnytsia Oblast
