= Nova Huta, Ternopil Oblast =

Rural locality in Ternopil Oblast, Ukraine

Nova Huta Нова Гута
- Location in Ternopil Oblast
- Coordinates: 49°8′17″N 25°5′49″E
- Country: Ukraine
- Oblast: Ternopil Oblast
- Raion: Chortkiv Raion
- Hromada: Monastyryska urban hromada
- Time zone: UTC+2 (EET)
  - Summer (DST): UTC+3 (EEST)
- Postal code: 48305

Nova Huta (Ukrainian: Нова Гута) is a village in Monastyryska urban hromada, Chortkiv Raion, Ternopil Oblast, Ukraine.

== History ==
It is known from the 18th century.

After the liquidation of the Monastyryska Raion on 19 July 2020, the village became part of the Chortkiv Raion.

== Religion ==
- St. Michael's church (1881, wooden, UGCC),
- Church of the Visitation of Elizabeth by the Blessed Virgin Mary (1932).

== Sources ==
- (in Ukrainian) Бігус М., Нова Гута // Ternopil Encyclopedic Dictionary: in 4 v. / editorial board: H. Yavorskyi and other, Ternopil: "Zbruch", 2005, V. 2: К—О, S. 636. — ISBN 966-528-199-2.
- "Huta 17.) H.-nowa i stara z Izabelą, wś, pow. buczacki". Geographical Dictionary of the Kingdom of Poland (in Polish). 3. Warszawa: Kasa im. Józefa Mianowskiego. 1882. p. 236.
