= Dobrovody, Chortkiv Raion, Ternopil Oblast =

Rural locality in Ternopil Oblast, Ukraine

Dobrovody Доброводи
- Location in Ternopil Oblast
- Coordinates: 49°09′22″N 25°12′48″E
- Country: Ukraine
- Oblast: Ternopil Oblast
- Raion: Chortkiv Raion
- Hromada: Monastyryska urban hromada
- Time zone: UTC+2 (EET)
  - Summer (DST): UTC+3 (EEST)
- Postal code: 48321

Dobrovody (Ukrainian: Доброводи) is a village in Monastyryska urban hromada, Chortkiv Raion, Ternopil Oblast, Ukraine.

== History ==
It was first mentioned in writings in 1375.

After the liquidation of the Monastyryska Raion on 19 July 2020, the village became part of the Chortkiv Raion.

== Religion ==
- Church of the Descent of the Holy Spirit (1836, rebuilt in 1989).

== Sources ==
- (in Ukrainian) Костура О., Уніят В., Доброводи // Ternopil Encyclopedic Dictionary: in 4 v. / editorial board: H. Yavorskyi and other, Ternopil: "Zbruch", 2004, V. 1: А—Й, S. 511. — ISBN 966-528-197-6.
- "Dobrowody (1), wś, pow. podhajecki". Geographical Dictionary of the Kingdom of Poland (in Polish). 2. Warszawa: Kasa im. Józefa Mianowskiego. 1881. p. 79-80.
