= Zastavtsi, Ternopil Oblast =

Rural locality in Ternopil Oblast, Ukraine

Zastavtsi Заставці
- Location in Ternopil Oblast
- Coordinates: 49°9′56″N 25°8′35″E
- Country: Ukraine
- Oblast: Ternopil Oblast
- Raion: Chortkiv Raion
- Hromada: Monastyryska urban hromada
- Time zone: UTC+2 (EET)
  - Summer (DST): UTC+3 (EEST)
- Postal code: 48314

Zastavtsi (Ukrainian: Заставці) is a village in Monastyryska urban hromada, Chortkiv Raion, Ternopil Oblast, Ukraine.

== History ==
It was first mentioned in writings in 1470.

After the liquidation of the Monastyryska Raion on 19 July 2020, the village became part of the Chortkiv Raion.

== Religion ==
- Church of the Cathedral of the Blessed Virgin Mary (1890, wooden).

== Sources ==
- (in Ukrainian) Бігус М., Грещина Д., Лупак В., Заставці // Ternopil Encyclopedic Dictionary: in 4 v. / editorial board: H. Yavorskyi and other, Ternopil: "Zbruch", 2004, V. 1: А—Й, 696 s. — ISBN 966-528-197-6.
- "Zastawce, pow. podhajecki". Geographical Dictionary of the Kingdom of Poland (in Polish). 14. Warszawa: Kasa im. Józefa Mianowskiego. 1895. p. 451.
