= Savelivka, Ternopil Oblast =

Rural locality in Ternopil Oblast, Ukraine

Savelivka Савелівка
- Location in Ternopil Oblast
- Coordinates: 49°7′11″N 25°12′52″E
- Country: Ukraine
- Oblast: Ternopil Oblast
- Raion: Chortkiv Raion
- Hromada: Monastyryska urban hromada
- Time zone: UTC+2 (EET)
  - Summer (DST): UTC+3 (EEST)
- Postal code: 48322

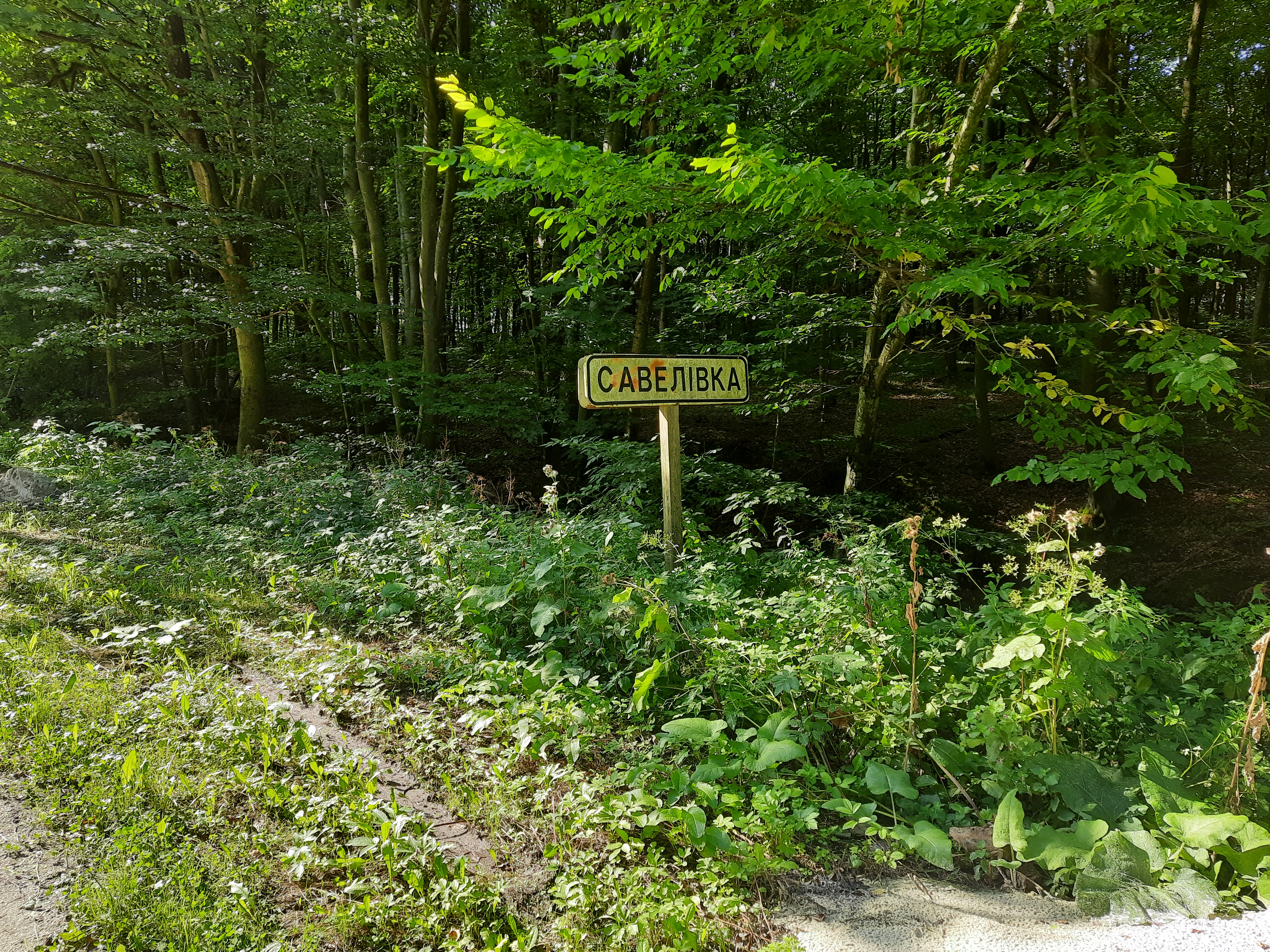
Road sign at the entrance to the village of Savelivka Chortkiv district, Ternopil region.

Savelivka (Ukrainian: Савелівка; until 1947 – Savalusky) is a village in Monastyryska urban hromada, Chortkiv Raion, Ternopil Oblast, Ukraine.

== History ==
It was first mentioned in writings in 1450.

After the liquidation of the Monastyryska Raion on 19 July 2020, the village became part of the Chortkiv Raion.

== Religion ==
- Church of St. John the Baptist (1878, UGCC).

The village also has a chapel of the Assumption (2004) on the spot where the Mother of God appeared. Every year on 19 August, Savelivka hosts a big holiday, a pilgrimage, and a service for the clergy.

== Sources ==
- (in Ukrainian) Мельничук Б., Савка І., Савелівка // Ternopil Encyclopedic Dictionary: in 4 v. / editorial board: H. Yavorskyi and other, Ternopil: "Zbruch", 2008, V. 3: П—Я, S. 213. — ISBN 978-966-528-279-2.
- "Sawałuski, al. Zawałuski". Geographical Dictionary of the Kingdom of Poland (in Polish). 10. Warszawa: Kasa im. Józefa Mianowskiego. 1889. p. 342.
