= Krasiiv =

Rural locality in Ternopil Oblast, Ukraine

Krasiiv Красіїв
- Location in Ternopil Oblast
- Coordinates: 49°3′42″N 25°1′49″E
- Country: Ukraine
- Oblast: Ternopil Oblast
- Raion: Chortkiv Raion
- Hromada: Monastyryska urban hromada
- Time zone: UTC+2 (EET)
  - Summer (DST): UTC+3 (EEST)
- Postal code: 48331

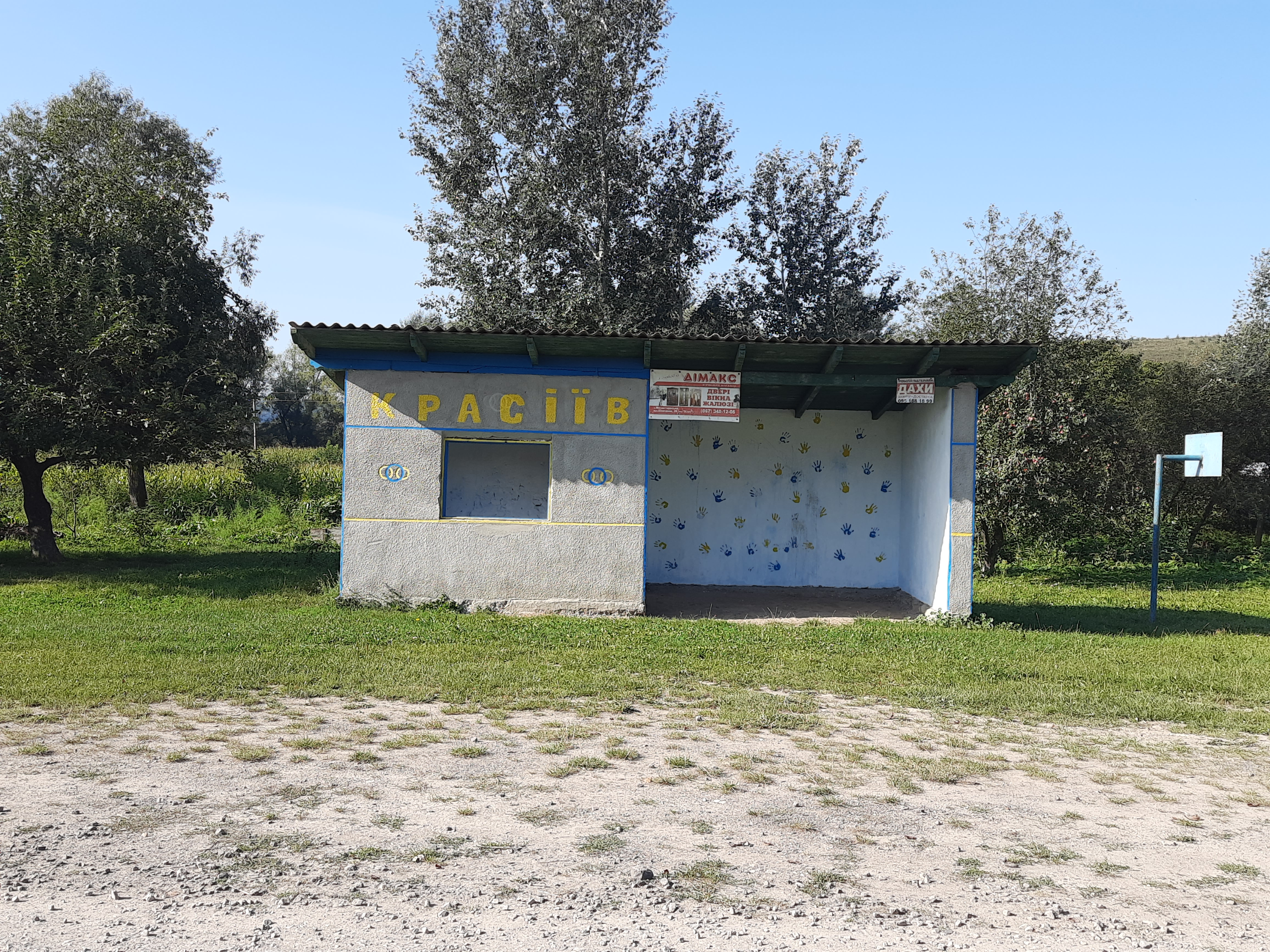

Krasiiv (Ukrainian: Красіїв) is a village in Monastyryska urban hromada, Chortkiv Raion, Ternopil Oblast, Ukraine.

== History ==
It was first mentioned in writings in 1464.

After the liquidation of the Monastyryska Raion on 19 July 2020, the village became part of the Chortkiv Raion.

== Religion ==
- Church of the Presentation of the Blessed Virgin Mary (1993).

== Sources ==
- (in Ukrainian) Бігус М., Уніят Г., Красіїв // Ternopil Encyclopedic Dictionary: in 4 v. / editorial board: H. Yavorskyi and other, Ternopil: "Zbruch", 2005, V. 2: К—О, S. 218. — ISBN 966-528-199-2.
- "Krasiejów, pow. buczacki". Geographical Dictionary of the Kingdom of Poland (in Polish). 4. Warszawa: Kasa im. Józefa Mianowskiego. 1883. p. 614.
