= Chekhiv =

Rural locality in Ternopil Oblast, Ukraine

Chekhiv Чехів
- Location in Ternopil Oblast
- Coordinates: 49°4′18″N 25°11′53″E
- Country: Ukraine
- Oblast: Ternopil Oblast
- Raion: Chortkiv Raion
- Hromada: Monastyryska urban hromada
- Time zone: UTC+2 (EET)
  - Summer (DST): UTC+3 (EEST)
- Postal code: 48305

Chekhiv (Ukrainian: Чехів) is a village in Monastyryska urban hromada, Chortkiv Raion, Ternopil Oblast, Ukraine.

== History ==
It was first mentioned in writings in 1454.

After the liquidation of the Monastyryska Raion on 19 July 2020, the village became part of the Chortkiv Raion.

== Religion ==
- Church of the Intercession (1885, wooden).

== Sources ==
- (in Ukrainian) Бойко Т., Уніят В., Черемшинський О., Чехів // Ternopil Encyclopedic Dictionary: in 4 v. / editorial board: H. Yavorskyi and other, Ternopil: "Zbruch", 2008, V. 3: П—Я, S. 597. — ISBN 978-966-528-279-2.
- "Czechów 1.) wś, pow. buczacki". Geographical Dictionary of the Kingdom of Poland (in Polish). 1. Warszawa: Kasa im. Józefa Mianowskiego. 1880. p. 778.
