= Senkiv =

Senkiv (Ukrainian: Сеньків) is a name of several populated places in Ukraine:

- Senkiv, Chortkiv Raion, Ternopil Oblast
- Senkiv, Ternopil Raion, Ternopil Oblast
