= Markova, Ternopil Oblast =

Rural locality in Ternopil Oblast, Ukraine

Markova Маркова
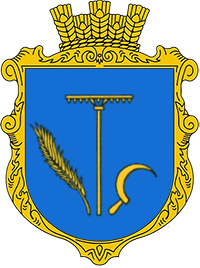
- Coat of arms

- Location in Ternopil Oblast
- Coordinates: 49°9′34″N 25°2′57″E
- Country: Ukraine
- Oblast: Ternopil Oblast
- Raion: Chortkiv Raion
- Hromada: Monastyryska urban hromada
- Time zone: UTC+2 (EET)
  - Summer (DST): UTC+3 (EEST)
- Postal code: 48313

Markova (Ukrainian: Маркова) is a village in Monastyryska urban hromada, Chortkiv Raion, Ternopil Oblast, Ukraine.

== History ==
It was first mentioned in writings in 1441.

After the liquidation of the Monastyryska Raion on 19 July 2020, the village became part of the Chortkiv Raion.

== Religion ==
- Church of the Intercession (1993, brick),
- Roman Catholic church (1909, not functioning).

== Sources ==
- (in Ukrainian) Уніят Г., Ма́ркова // Ternopil Encyclopedic Dictionary: in 4 v. / editorial board: H. Yavorskyi and other, Ternopil: "Zbruch", 2005, V. 2: К—О, S. 460. — ISBN 966-528-199-2.
- "Markowa 3.) M., wś w pow. podhajeckim". Geographical Dictionary of the Kingdom of Poland (in Polish). 6. Warszawa: Kasa im. Józefa Mianowskiego. 1885. p. 126.
