= Trostiantsi =

Rural locality in Ternopil Oblast, Ukraine

Trostiantsi Тростянці
- Location in Ternopil Oblast
- Coordinates: 49°4′1″N 24°56′6″E
- Country: Ukraine
- Oblast: Ternopil Oblast
- Raion: Chortkiv Raion
- Hromada: Monastyryska urban hromada
- Time zone: UTC+2 (EET)
  - Summer (DST): UTC+3 (EEST)
- Postal code: 48333

Trostiantsi (Ukrainian: Тростянці) is a village in Monastyryska urban hromada, Chortkiv Raion, Ternopil Oblast, Ukraine.

== History ==
It was first mentioned in writings in 1515.

After the liquidation of the Monastyryska Raion on 19 July 2020, the village became part of the Chortkiv Raion.

== Religion ==
- Holy Trinity church (1812, rebuilt in 1911, UGCC);
- chapel (early XX century, inactive, RCC).

== Sources ==
- (in Ukrainian) Гусениця І., Ковальков Ю., Тростянці // Ternopil Encyclopedic Dictionary: in 4 v. / editorial board: H. Yavorskyi and other, Ternopil: "Zbruch", 2008, V. 3: П—Я, S. 471. — ISBN 978-966-528-279-2.
- "Trościańce". Geographical Dictionary of the Kingdom of Poland (in Polish). 12. Warszawa: Kasa im. Józefa Mianowskiego. 1892. p. 504.
