= Horishnia Slobidka =

Rural locality in Ternopil Oblast, Ukraine

Horishnia Slobidka Горішня Слобідка
- Location in Ternopil Oblast
- Coordinates: 49°7′22″N 25°9′36″E
- Country: Ukraine
- Oblast: Ternopil Oblast
- Raion: Chortkiv Raion
- Hromada: Monastyryska urban hromada
- Time zone: UTC+2 (EET)
  - Summer (DST): UTC+3 (EEST)
- Postal code: 48315

Church in Horishnia Slobidka

Horishnia Slobidka (Ukrainian: Горішня Слобідка; Polish: Słobódka Górna) is a village in Monastyryska urban hromada, Chortkiv Raion, Ternopil Oblast, Ukraine.

== History ==
It was first mentioned in writings in 1710.

After the liquidation of the Monastyryska Raion on 19 July 2020, the village became part of the Chortkiv Raion.

== Religion ==
- Saint Theodosius of the Caves church (1868, wooden; 1995, brick; architect Mykhailo Netrybiak).

== Sources ==
- (in Ukrainian) Парацій М., Уніят В., Горішня Слобідка // Ternopil Encyclopedic Dictionary: in 4 v. / editorial board: H. Yavorskyi and other, Ternopil: "Zbruch", 2004, V. 1: А—Й, S. 399. — ISBN 966-528-197-6.
- "Słobódka 14.) Górna, wieś, powiat buczacki". Geographical Dictionary of the Kingdom of Poland (in Polish). 10. Warszawa: Kasa im. Józefa Mianowskiego. 1889. p. 807.
