= Zalissia, Monastyryska urban hromada, Chortkiv Raion, Ternopil Oblast =

Rural locality in Ternopil Oblast, Ukraine

Zalissia Залісся
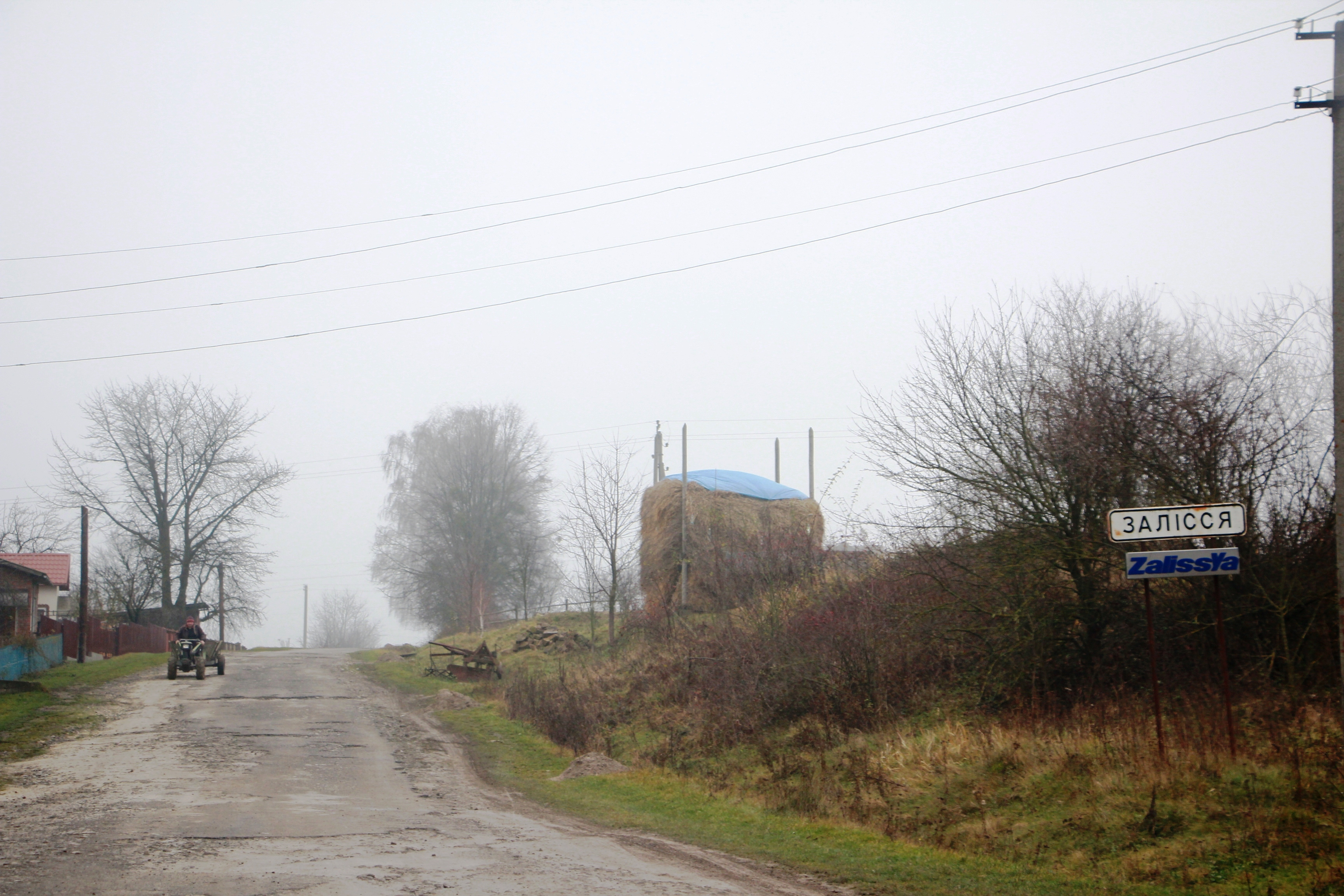
- Roadside sign at the entrance to the village of Zalissya

- Location in Ternopil Oblast
- Coordinates: 49°0′52″N 25°12′21″E
- Country: Ukraine
- Oblast: Ternopil Oblast
- Raion: Chortkiv Raion
- Hromada: Monastyryska urban hromada
- Time zone: UTC+2 (EET)
  - Summer (DST): UTC+3 (EEST)
- Postal code: 48312

Zalissia (Ukrainian: Залісся) is a village in Monastyryska urban hromada, Chortkiv Raion, Ternopil Oblast, Ukraine.

== History ==
Zalissia was first documented in 1441, as recorded in the "Akta grodzkie i ziemskie," a collection of judicial records from the Kingdom of Poland.

Throughout its history, Zalissia experienced various administrative changes. Following the partitions of Poland in the late 18th century, the region became part of the Habsburg Monarchy's Kingdom of Galicia and Lodomeria. After World War I, it was incorporated into the Second Polish Republic. In 1939, the area was annexed by the Soviet Union, and during World War II, it fell under Nazi occupation before being retaken by the Soviets in 1944. Since Ukraine's independence in 1991, Zalissia has been part of the sovereign nation.

After the liquidation of the Monastyryska Raion on 19 July 2020, the village became part of the Chortkiv Raion.

The village is also notable for its proximity to the Mlynky Cave, a gypsum karst cave system discovered in the early 20th century. Local residents initially uncovered the cave while extracting gypsum for household use. In 1960, teacher Mykhailo Bil from the neighboring village of Uhryn led an exploration of the cave with his students, marking the beginning of systematic studies of the cave's extensive labyrinths.

== Religion ==
- Church of the Nativity of the Blessed Virgin Mary (1880, restored in 1991).

== Sources ==
- (in Ukrainian) Грицина Д., Черемшинський О., Залісся // Ternopil Encyclopedic Dictionary: in 4 v. / editorial board: H. Yavorskyi and other, Ternopil: "Zbruch", 2004, V. 1: А—Й, S. 607. — ISBN 966-528-197-6.
- "Zalesie 4.) Z., al. Zalesie Koropieckie wś, pow. buczacki". Geographical Dictionary of the Kingdom of Poland (in Polish). 14. Warszawa: Kasa im. Józefa Mianowskiego. 1895. p. 340.
