= Dubenka, Ternopil Oblast =

Rural locality in Ternopil Oblast, Ukraine

Dubenka Дубенка
- Location in Ternopil Oblast
- Coordinates: 49°3′19″N 25°10′38″E
- Country: Ukraine
- Oblast: Ternopil Oblast
- Raion: Chortkiv Raion
- Hromada: Monastyryska urban hromada
- Time zone: UTC+2 (EET)
  - Summer (DST): UTC+3 (EEST)
- Postal code: 48350

Dubenka (Ukrainian: Дубенка) is a village in Monastyryska urban hromada, Chortkiv Raion, Ternopil Oblast, Ukraine.

== History ==
It was first mentioned in writings in 1823.

After the liquidation of the Monastyryska Raion on 19 July 2020, the village became part of the Chortkiv Raion.

== Religion ==
- Church of the Assumption (1878, brick, UGCC),
- Saints Peter and Paul (1885, brick, UGCC).

== Sources ==
- (in Ukrainian) Уніят В., Фецич І., Дубенки // Ternopil Encyclopedic Dictionary: in 4 v. / editorial board: H. Yavorskyi and other, Ternopil: "Zbruch", 2004, V. 1: А—Й, S. 538. — ISBN 966-528-197-6.
- "Dubienko". Geographical Dictionary of the Kingdom of Poland (in Polish). 2. Warszawa: Kasa im. Józefa Mianowskiego. 1881. p. 190.
