= Kovalyovka =

Kovalyovka Ковалёвка
- Village
- Location within Bashkortostan Location within Russia
- Coordinates: 52°49′N 56°00′E
- Country: Russia
- Region: Bashkortostan
- District: Kuyurgazinsky District
- Time zone: UTC+5:00

Kovalyovka (Russian: Ковалёвка) is a rural locality (a village) in Leninsky Selsoviet, Kuyurgazinsky District, Bashkortostan, Russia. The population was 81 as of 2010. There are 6 streets.

== Geography ==
Kovalyovka is located 29 km northeast of Yermolayevo (the district's administrative centre) by road. Khudayberdino is the nearest rural locality.

== See also ==
- Kovalyovka, Volgograd Oblast
- Kovalivka
