= Hryhoriv, Ternopil Oblast =

Rural locality in Ternopil Oblast, Ukraine

Hryhoriv Григорів
- Location in Ternopil Oblast
- Coordinates: 49°5′53″N 25°12′56″E
- Country: Ukraine
- Oblast: Ternopil Oblast
- Raion: Chortkiv Raion
- Hromada: Monastyryska urban hromada
- Time zone: UTC+2 (EET)
  - Summer (DST): UTC+3 (EEST)
- Postal code: 48324

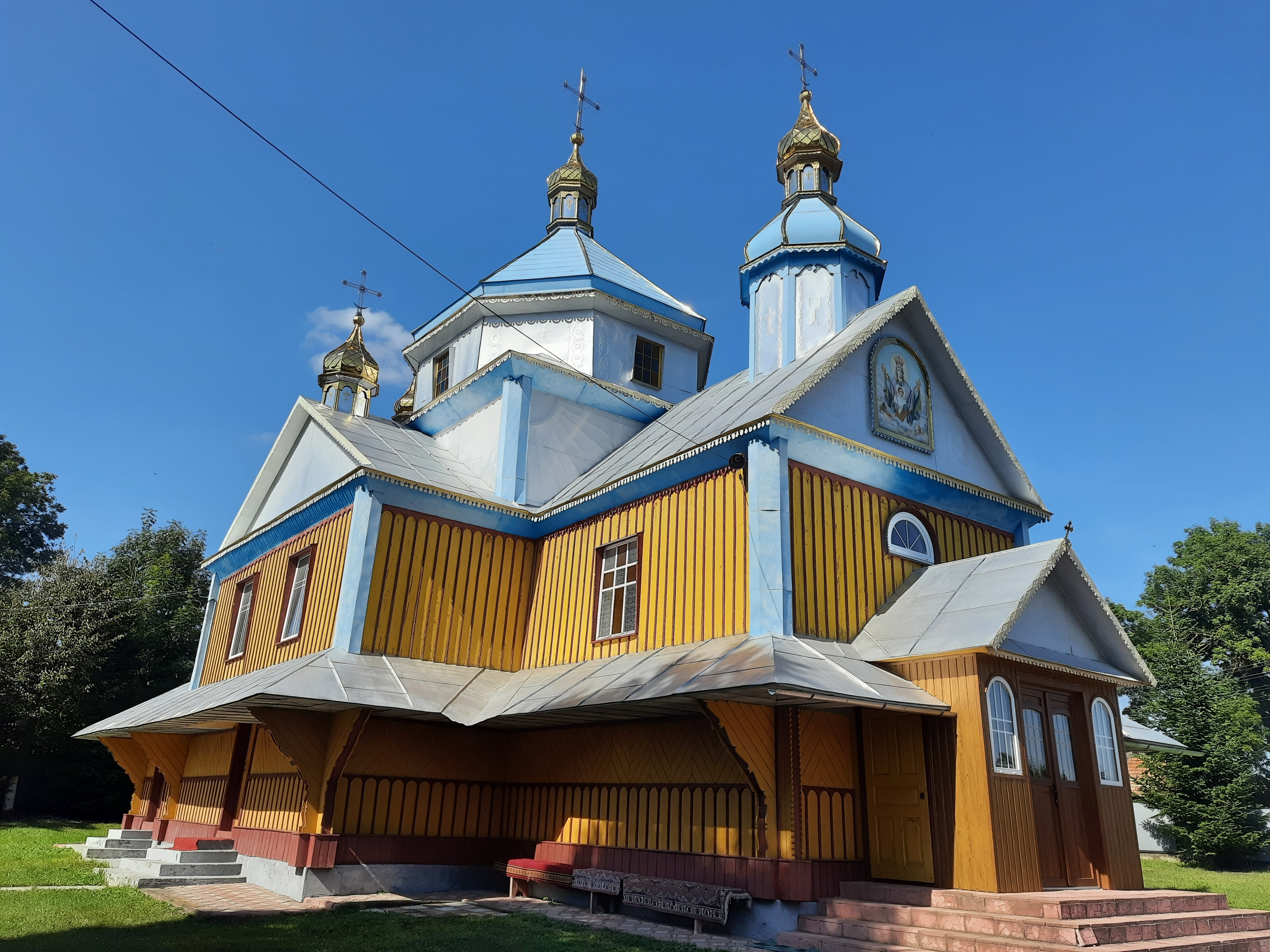
Church of the Blessed Virgin Mary, Hryhoriv village, Ternopil region

Hryhoriv (Ukrainian: Григорів) is a village in Monastyryska urban hromada, Chortkiv Raion, Ternopil Oblast, Ukraine.

== History ==
It was first mentioned in writings in 1454.

After the liquidation of the Monastyryska Raion on 19 July 2020, the village became part of the Chortkiv Raion.

== Religion ==
- Church of the Cathedral of the Blessed Virgin Mary (1865; wooden, restored in 1987).

== Sources ==
- (in Ukrainian) , Григорів // Ternopil Encyclopedic Dictionary: in 4 v. / editorial board: H. Yavorskyi and other, Ternopil: "Zbruch", 2004, V. 1: А—Й, 696 s. — ISBN 966-528-197-6.
- "Hrehorów 2.) H., wś, pow. buczacki, 4 km od w. Monasterzyska". Geographical Dictionary of the Kingdom of Poland (in Polish). 3. Warszawa: Kasa im. Józefa Mianowskiego. 1882. p. 176.
