= Korzhova, Ternopil Oblast =

Rural locality in Ternopil Oblast, Ukraine

Korzhova Коржова
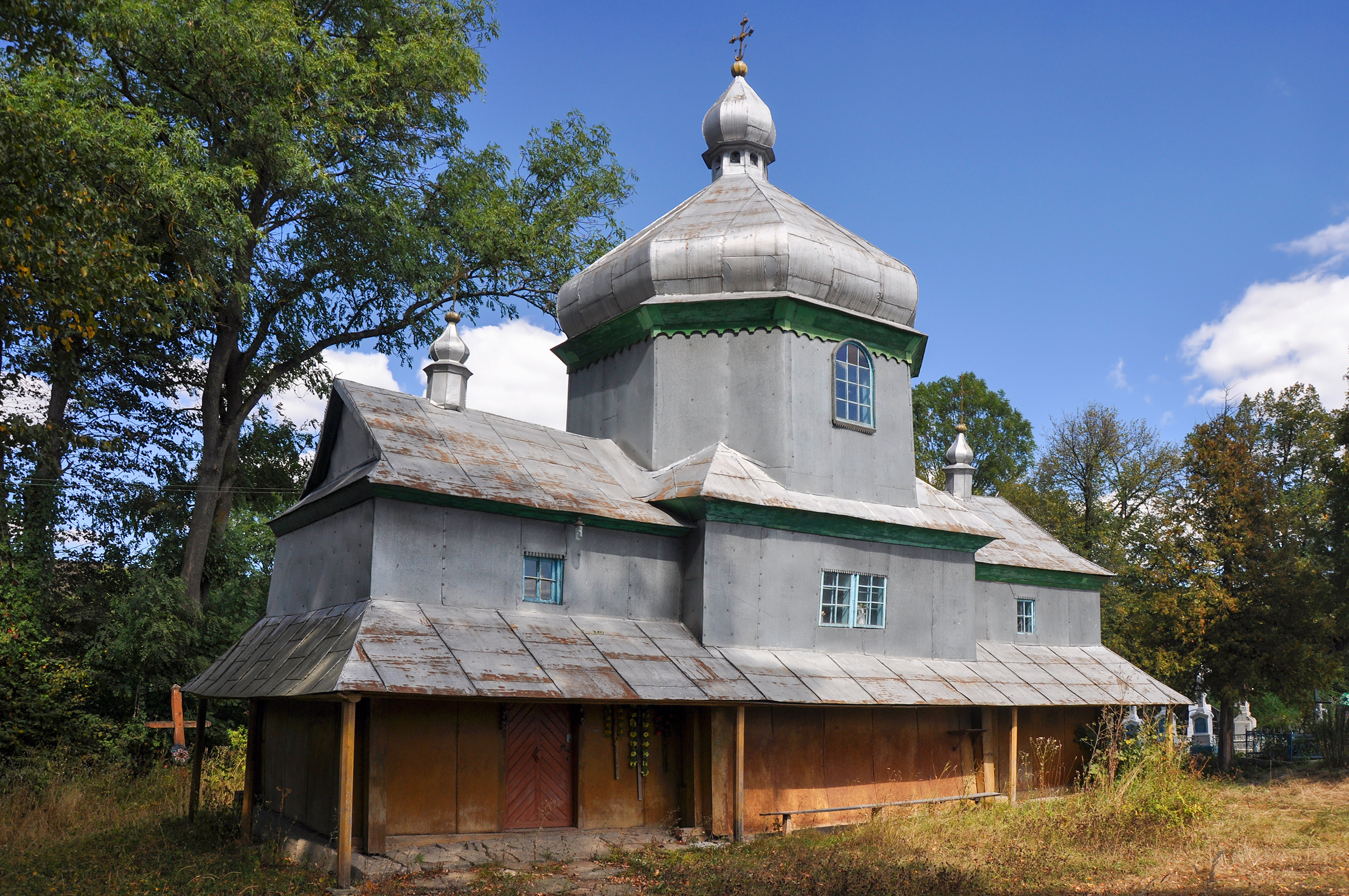
- Saint Michael church

- Location in Ternopil Oblast
- Coordinates: 49°7′39″N 25°1′51″E
- Country: Ukraine
- Oblast: Ternopil Oblast
- Raion: Chortkiv Raion
- Hromada: Monastyryska urban hromada
- Time zone: UTC+2 (EET)
  - Summer (DST): UTC+3 (EEST)
- Postal code: 48313

Korzhova (Ukrainian: Коржова) is a village in Monastyryska urban hromada, Chortkiv Raion, Ternopil Oblast, Ukraine.

== History ==
It was first mentioned in writings in 1561.

After the liquidation of the Monastyryska Raion on 19 July 2020, the village became part of the Chortkiv Raion.

== Religion ==
- Two churches of St. Michael (1880, wooden; 2012, brick; architect M. Netrybiak).

== Sources ==
- (in Ukrainian) Метенчук М., Уніят Г., Коржова // Ternopil Encyclopedic Dictionary: in 4 v. / editorial board: H. Yavorskyi and other, Ternopil: "Zbruch", 2005, V. 2: К—О, S. 175. — ISBN 966-528-199-2.
