= Nyzkolyzy =

Rural locality in Ternopil Oblast, Ukraine

Nyzkolyzy Низьколизи
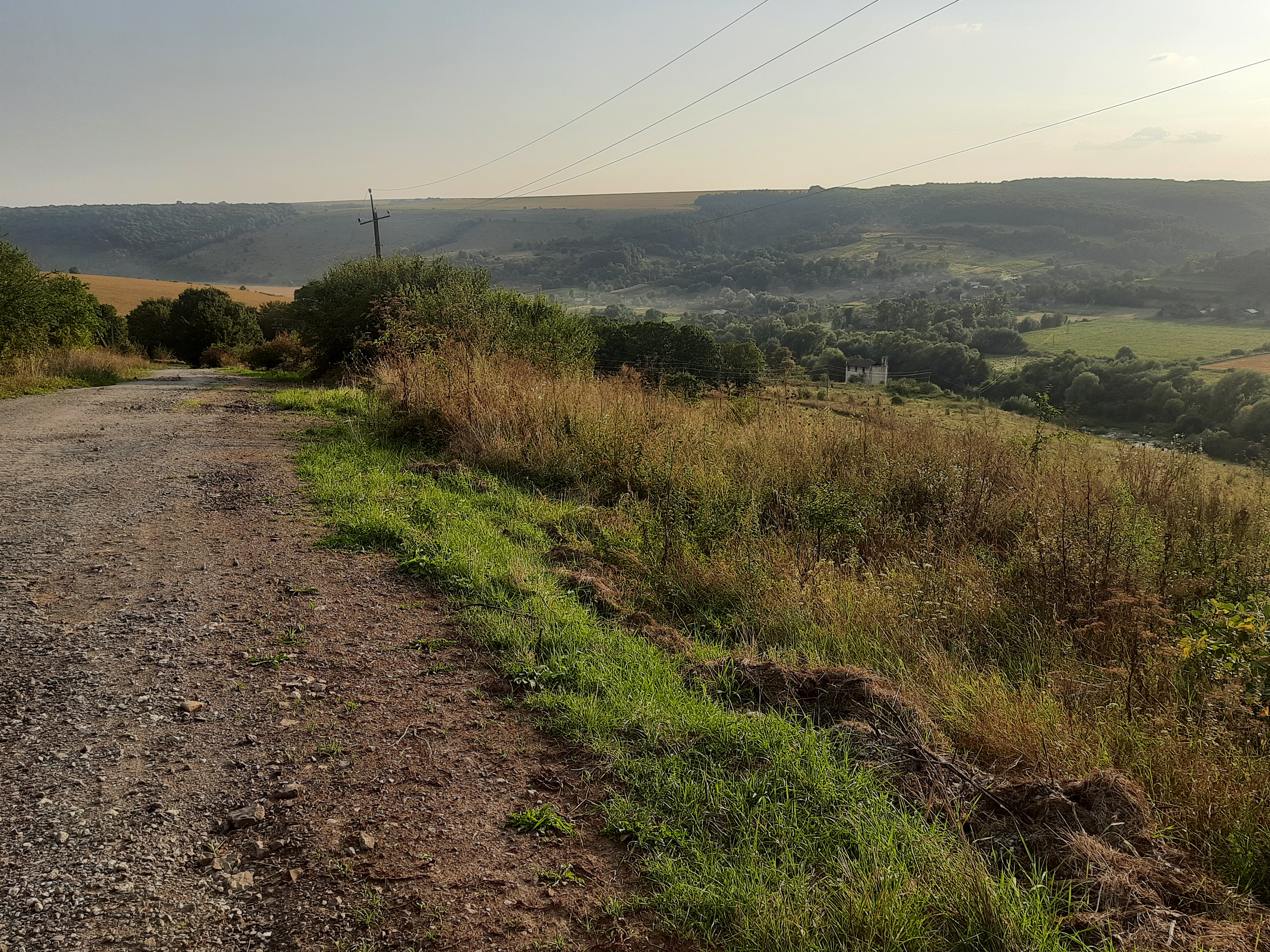
- View of the village from Nyzkolyzy hill Chortkiv district, Ternopil region

- Location in Ternopil Oblast
- Coordinates: 49°1′36″N 25°2′17″E
- Country: Ukraine
- Oblast: Ternopil Oblast
- Raion: Chortkiv Raion
- Hromada: Monastyryska urban hromada
- Time zone: UTC+2 (EET)
  - Summer (DST): UTC+3 (EEST)
- Postal code: 48340

Nyzkolyzy (Ukrainian: Низьколизи) is a village in Monastyryska urban hromada, Chortkiv Raion, Ternopil Oblast, Ukraine.

== History ==
It was first mentioned in writings in 1454.

After the liquidation of the Monastyryska Raion on 19 July 2020, the village became part of the Chortkiv Raion.

== Religion ==
- Church of the Descent of the Holy Spirit (1883).

== Sources ==
- (in Ukrainian) Броніцький І., Лашта В., Низьколизи // Ternopil Encyclopedic Dictionary: in 4 v. / editorial board: H. Yavorskyi and other, Ternopil: "Zbruch", 2005, V. 2: К—О, S. 628. — ISBN 966-528-199-2.
- "Niskołyzy". Geographical Dictionary of the Kingdom of Poland (in Polish). 7. Warszawa: Kasa im. Józefa Mianowskiego. 1886. p. 157.
