= Ridkolissia (village) =

Rural locality in Ternopil Oblast, Ukraine

Ridkolissia Рідколісся
- Location in Ternopil Oblast
- Coordinates: 49°7′5″N 25°6′46″E
- Country: Ukraine
- Oblast: Ternopil Oblast
- Raion: Chortkiv Raion
- Hromada: Monastyryska urban hromada
- Time zone: UTC+2 (EET)
  - Summer (DST): UTC+3 (EEST)
- Postal code: 48305

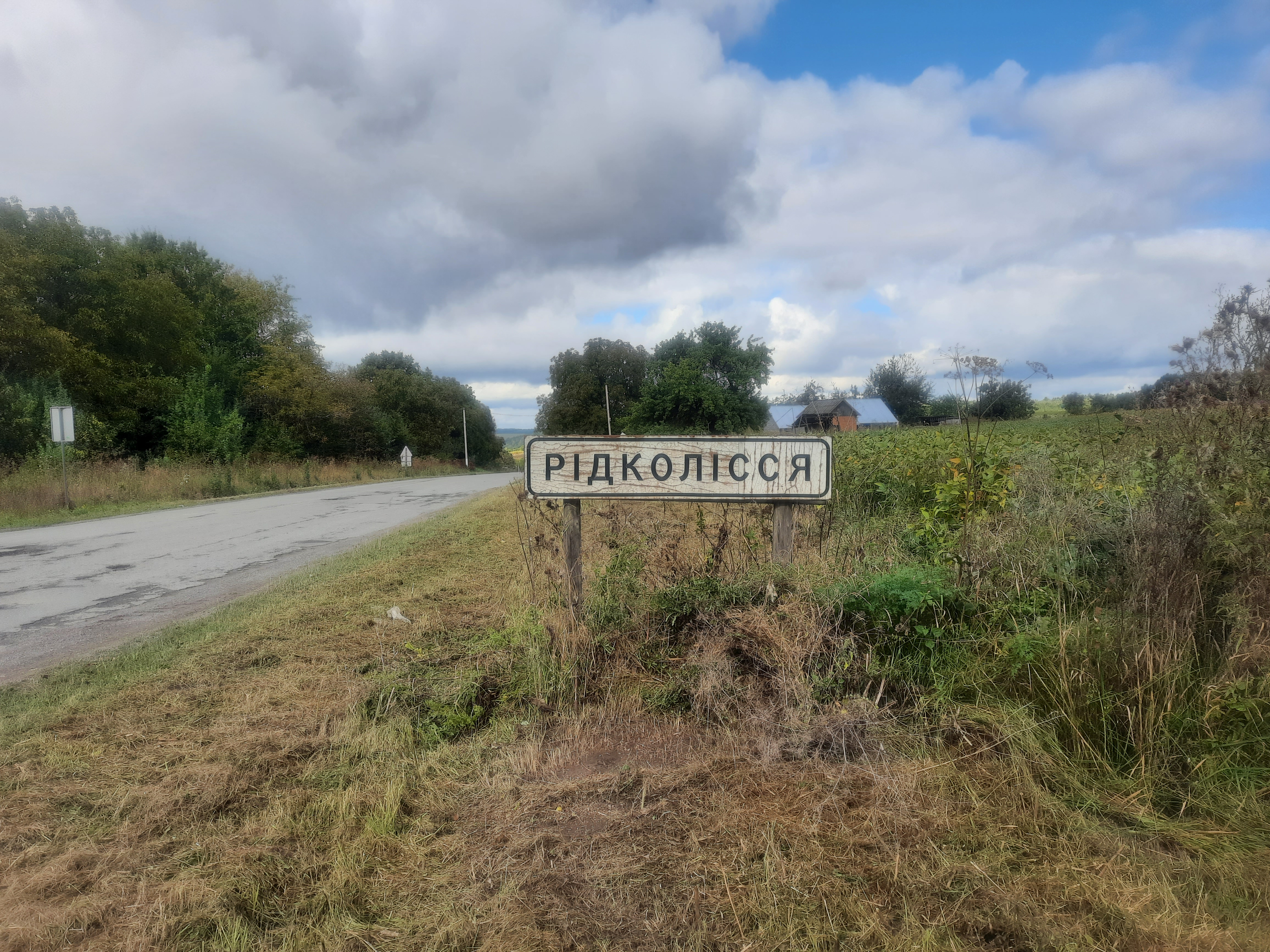
Road sign at the entrance to the village of Ridkolissia. Chortkiv district, Ternopil region.

Ridkolissia (Ukrainian: Рідколісся; until 1945 – Izabella) is a village in Monastyryska urban hromada, Chortkiv Raion, Ternopil Oblast, Ukraine.

== History ==
Known from the beginning of the 19th century.

After the liquidation of the Monastyryska Raion on 19 July 2020, the village became part of the Chortkiv Raion.

== Religion ==
- St. Demetrius church (1830s, UGCC).

== Sources ==
- (in Ukrainian) Хаварівський Б., Рідколісся // Ternopil Encyclopedic Dictionary: in 4 v. / editorial board: H. Yavorskyi and other, Ternopil: "Zbruch", 2008, V. 3: П—Я, S. 181. — ISBN 978-966-528-279-2.
- "Huta (17) H.-nowa i stara z Izabelą, wś, pow. buczacki". Geographical Dictionary of the Kingdom of Poland (in Polish). 3. Warszawa: Kasa im. Józefa Mianowskiego. 1882. p. 236.
