= Ustia-Zelene =

Rural locality in Ternopil Oblast, Ukraine

Ustia-Zelene Устя-Зелене
- Location in Ternopil Oblast
- Coordinates: 49°1′37″N 24°57′51″E
- Country: Ukraine
- Oblast: Ternopil Oblast
- Raion: Chortkiv Raion
- Hromada: Monastyryska urban hromada
- Time zone: UTC+2 (EET)
  - Summer (DST): UTC+3 (EEST)
- Postal code: 48341

Ustia-Zelene (Ukrainian: Устя-Зелене) is a village in Monastyryska urban hromada, Chortkiv Raion, Ternopil Oblast, Ukraine.

== History ==
Known from the 13th century.

After the liquidation of the Monastyryska Raion on 19 July 2020, the village became part of the Chortkiv Raion.

== Religion ==
- Church of the Cathedral of the Blessed Virgin Mary (1893, brick, UGCC),
- Holy Trinity church (1735, restored in the 1990s, RCC).

== Notable residents ==
- Yuliian Pankevych (1863—1933), Ukrainian painter, writer, and activist

== Sources ==
- (in Ukrainian) Мельничук Б., Товстенюк О., Уніят В., Устя-Зелене // Ternopil Encyclopedic Dictionary: in 4 v. / editorial board: H. Yavorskyi and other, Ternopil: "Zbruch", 2008, V. 3: П—Я, S. 501. — ISBN 978-966-528-279-2.
- "Uście 4.) U. Zielone, miasteczko, pow. buczacki". Geographical Dictionary of the Kingdom of Poland (in Polish). 12. Warszawa: Kasa im. Józefa Mianowskiego. 1892. p. 834.
