= Wyczółki (disambiguation) =

Wyczółki is a neighbourhood in Masovian Voivodeship (east-central Poland).

Wyczółki may also refer to:

- Wyczółki, Lublin Voivodeship (east Poland)
- Wyczółki, Grodzisk County in Masovian Voivodeship (east-central Poland)
- Wyczółki, Podlaskie Voivodeship (north-east Poland)
- Wyczółki, Łosice County in Masovian Voivodeship (east-central Poland)
- Wyczółki, Siedlce County in Masovian Voivodeship (east-central Poland)
- Wyczółki, Sochaczew County in Masovian Voivodeship (east-central Poland)
- Wyczółki, Węgrów County in Masovian Voivodeship (east-central Poland)

Wyczółki may also refer to the former Polish name for the village of Vychulky, which is now called Honcharivka, in Ternopil Oblast, Ukraine
