= Zatyshne, Ternopil Oblast =

Rural locality in Ternopil Oblast, Ukraine

Zatyshne Затишне
- Location in Ternopil Oblast
- Coordinates: 48°59′13″N 25°7′53″E
- Country: Ukraine
- Oblast: Ternopil Oblast
- Raion: Chortkiv Raion
- Hromada: Monastyryska urban hromada
- Time zone: UTC+2 (EET)
  - Summer (DST): UTC+3 (EEST)
- Postal code: 48352

Zatyshne (Ukrainian: Затишне) is a village in Monastyryska urban hromada, Chortkiv Raion, Ternopil Oblast, Ukraine.

== History ==
It was first mentioned in writings in 1861 (under the name Hrabok).

After the liquidation of the Monastyryska Raion on 19 July 2020, the village became part of the Chortkiv Raion.

== Religion ==
- Church of the Nativity of the Blessed Virgin Mary (1990, brick, UGCC).

== Sources ==
- (in Ukrainian) Грицина Д., Одут Т., Затишне // Ternopil Encyclopedic Dictionary: in 4 v. / editorial board: H. Yavorskyi and other, Ternopil: "Zbruch", 2004, V. 1: А—Й, S. 627. — ISBN 966-528-197-6.
