= Luka, Ternopil Oblast =

Rural locality in Ternopil Oblast, Ukraine

Luka Лука
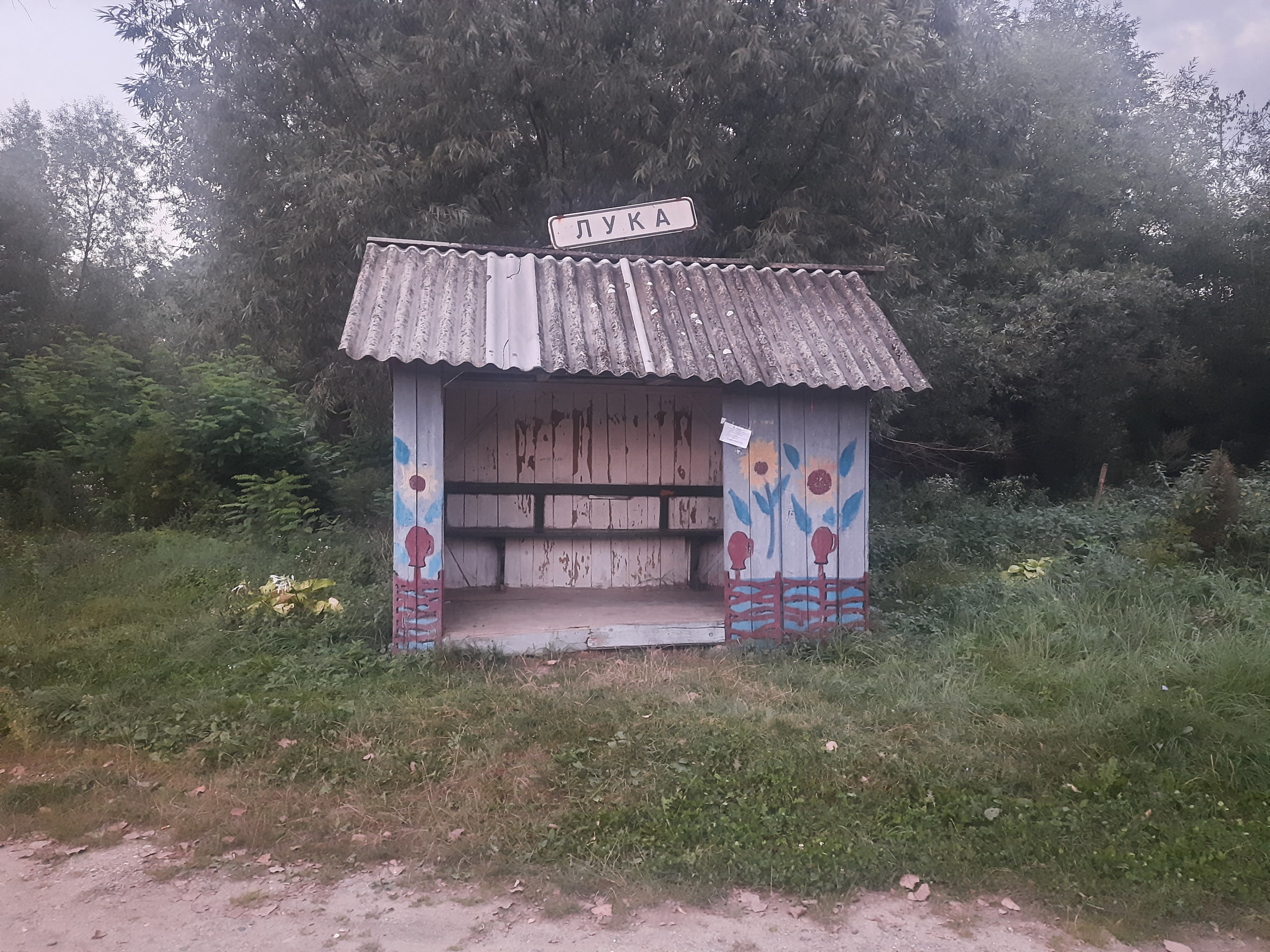
- Luka bus stop

- Location in Ternopil Oblast
- Coordinates: 49°1′3″N 24°59′2″E
- Country: Ukraine
- Oblast: Ternopil Oblast
- Raion: Chortkiv Raion
- Hromada: Monastyryska urban hromada
- Time zone: UTC+2 (EET)
  - Summer (DST): UTC+3 (EEST)
- Postal code: 48341

Luka (Ukrainian: Лука) is a village in Monastyryska urban hromada, Chortkiv Raion, Ternopil Oblast, Ukraine.

== History ==
Luka was first mentioned in writings in 1417.

After the liquidation of the Monastyryska Raion on 19 July 2020, the village became part of the Chortkiv Raion.

== Buildings ==
- St. Nicholas church (1927, wooden)

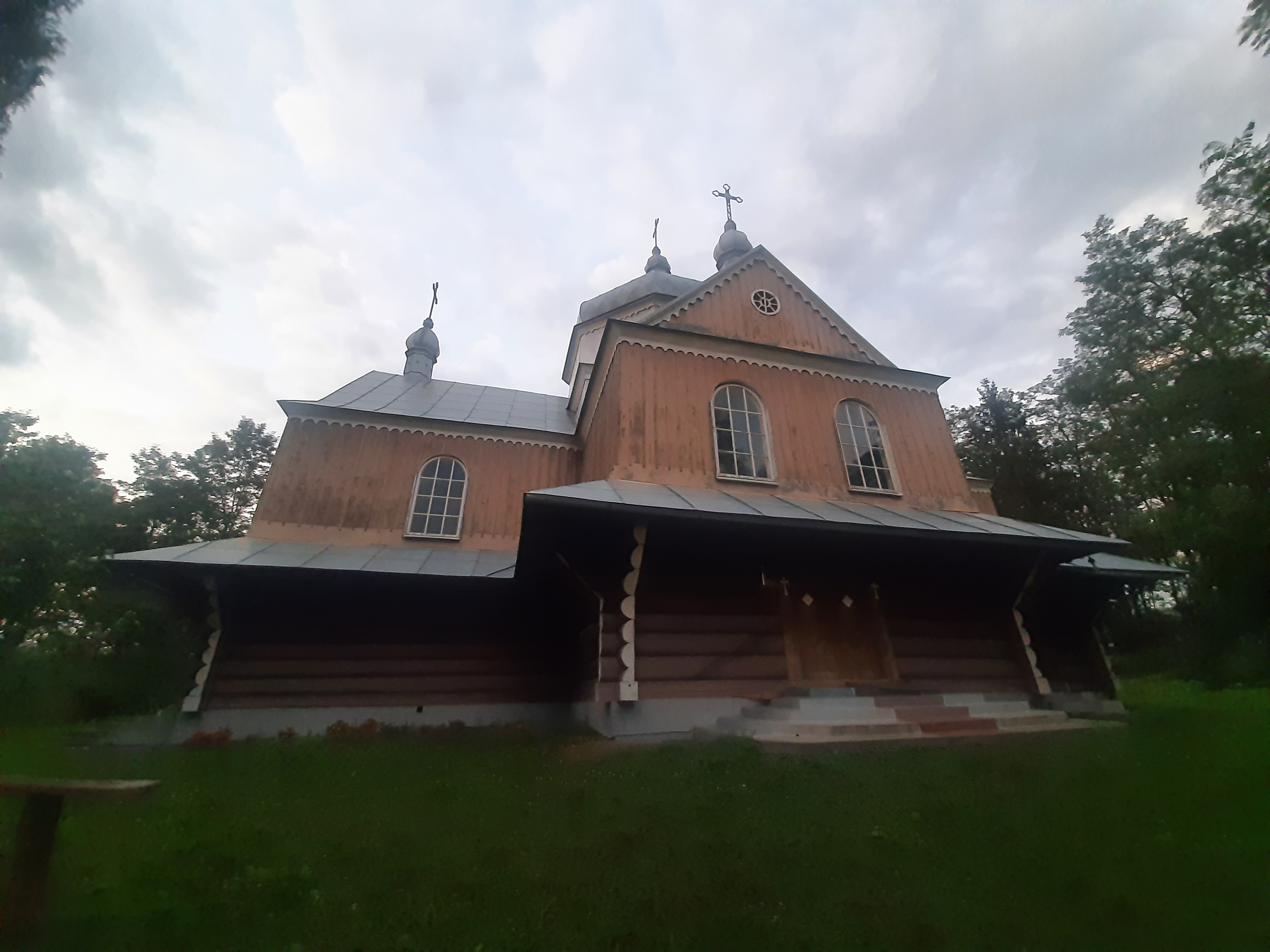
St. Nicolas Church

== Sources ==
- (in Ukrainian) Товстенюк О., Ханас В., Лука // Ternopil Encyclopedic Dictionary: in 4 v. / editorial board: H. Yavorskyi and other, Ternopil: "Zbruch", 2005, V. 2: К—О, S. 400. — ISBN 966-528-199-2.
- "Łuka 1.) wś w pow. buczackim". Geographical Dictionary of the Kingdom of Poland (in Polish). 5. Warszawa: Kasa im. Józefa Mianowskiego. 1884. p. 807—808.
