= Horozhanka (village) =

Rural locality in Ternopil Oblast, Ukraine

Horozhanka Горожанка
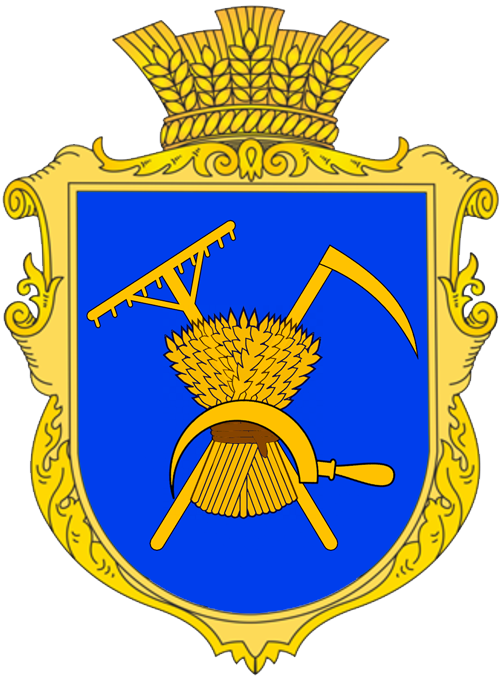
- Coat of arms

- Location in Ternopil Oblast
- Coordinates: 49°8′37″N 24°55′1″E
- Country: Ukraine
- Oblast: Ternopil Oblast
- Raion: Chortkiv Raion
- Hromada: Monastyryska urban hromada
- Time zone: UTC+2 (EET)
  - Summer (DST): UTC+3 (EEST)
- Postal code: 48311

Horozhanka (Ukrainian: Горожанка) is a village in Monastyryska urban hromada, Chortkiv Raion, Ternopil Oblast, Ukraine.

== History ==
It was first mentioned in writings in 1439.

After the liquidation of the Monastyryska Raion on 19 July 2020, the village became part of the Chortkiv Raion.

== Religion ==
- Church of the Assumption (1792, wooden; 2001, brick, UGCC),
- Roman Catholic Church of the Holy Spirit (1723, ruin).

== Monuments ==
- Horozhanka Castle

== Sources ==
- (in Ukrainian) Горбаль Б., Уніят В., Горожанка // Ternopil Encyclopedic Dictionary: in 4 v. / editorial board: H. Yavorskyi and other, Ternopil: "Zbruch", 2004, V. 1: А—Й, S. 403. — ISBN 966-528-197-6.
- "Horożanka". Geographical Dictionary of the Kingdom of Poland (in Polish). 3. Warszawa: Kasa im. Józefa Mianowskiego. 1882. p. 154.
