= Vysoke, Ternopil Oblast =

Rural locality in Ternopil Oblast, Ukraine

Vysoke Високе
- Location in Ternopil Oblast
- Coordinates: 49°8′34″N 25°0′38″E
- Country: Ukraine
- Oblast: Ternopil Oblast
- Raion: Chortkiv Raion
- Hromada: Monastyryska urban hromada
- Time zone: UTC+2 (EET)
  - Summer (DST): UTC+3 (EEST)
- Postal code: 48312

Vysoke (Ukrainian: Високе Polish: Wysokie; until 1965 – Tovstobaby Polish: Toustobaby) is a village in Monastyryska urban hromada, Chortkiv Raion, Ternopil Oblast, Ukraine.

== History ==
It was first mentioned in writings in 1435.

After the liquidation of the Monastyryska Raion on 19 July 2020, the village became part of the Chortkiv Raion.

== Religion ==
- Saint Basil the Great church (1925, wooden; 2012, brick).

== Sources ==
- (in Ukrainian) Дудас М., Лашта-Уніят Г., Високе // Ternopil Encyclopedic Dictionary: in 4 v. / editorial board: H. Yavorskyi and other, Ternopil: "Zbruch", 2004, V. 1: А—Й, S. 262. — ISBN 966-528-197-6.
- "Toustobaby 1.) wś, pow. podhajecki". Geographical Dictionary of the Kingdom of Poland (in Polish). 12. Warszawa: Kasa im. Józefa Mianowskiego. 1892. p. 438.
