= Sadzhivka =

Rural locality in Ternopil Oblast, Ukraine

Sadzhivka Саджівка
- Location in Ternopil Oblast
- Coordinates: 49°9′17″N 24°54′59″E
- Country: Ukraine
- Oblast: Ternopil Oblast
- Raion: Chortkiv Raion
- Hromada: Monastyryska urban hromada
- Time zone: UTC+2 (EET)
  - Summer (DST): UTC+3 (EEST)
- Postal code: 48311

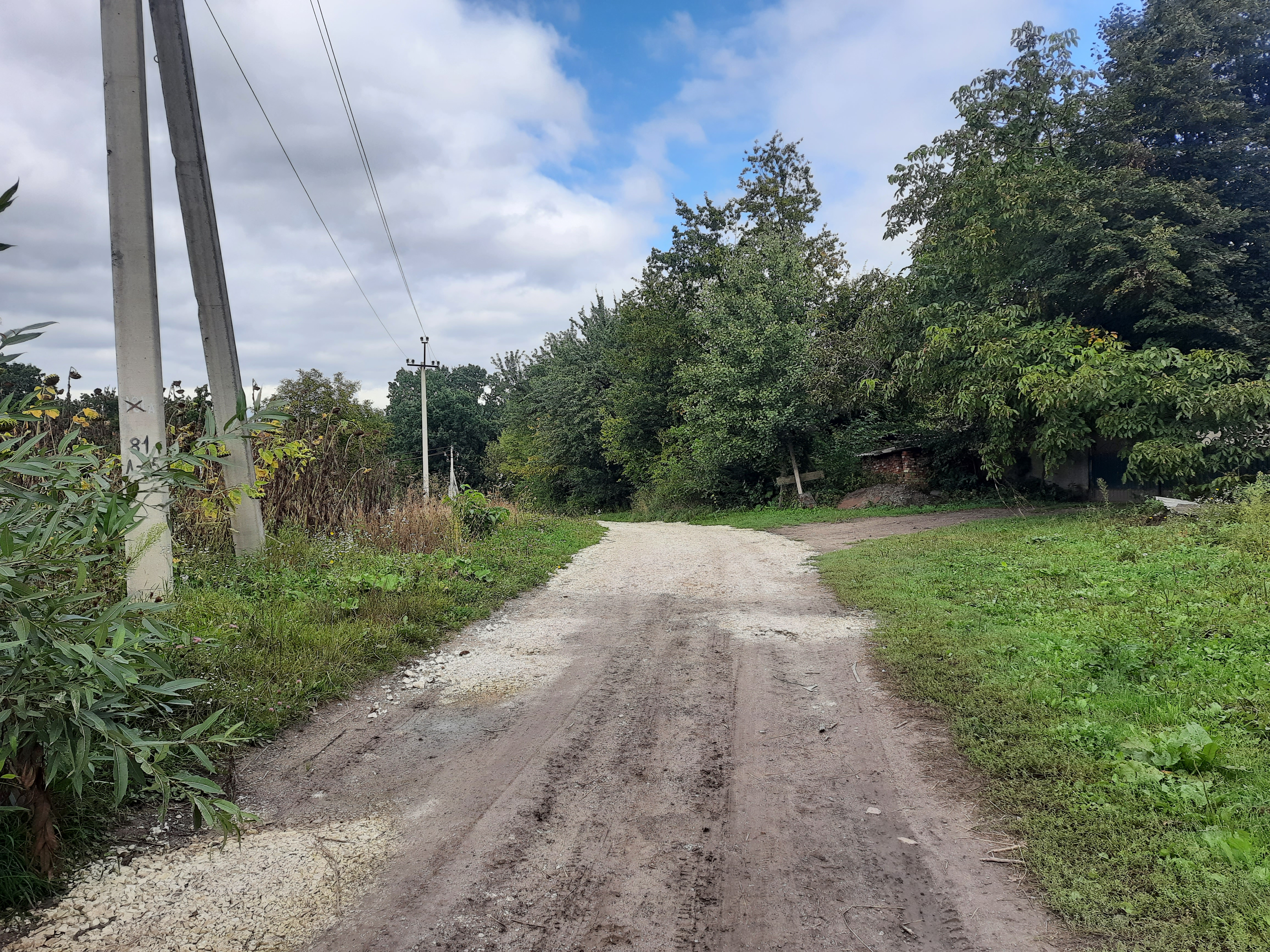
Entrance to the village of Sadzhyvka

Sadzhivka (Ukrainian: Саджівка) is a village in Monastyryska urban hromada, Chortkiv Raion, Ternopil Oblast, Ukraine.

== History ==
It was first mentioned in writings in 1905.

After the liquidation of the Monastyryska Raion on 19 July 2020, the village became part of the Chortkiv Raion.

== Sources ==
- (in Ukrainian) Новосядла Н., Хаварівський Б., Саджівка // Ternopil Encyclopedic Dictionary: in 4 v. / editorial board: H. Yavorskyi and other, Ternopil: "Zbruch", 2008, V. 3: П—Я, S. 221. — ISBN 978-966-528-279-2.
