= Mezhyhiria, Ternopil Oblast =

Rural locality in Ternopil Oblast, Ukraine

Mezhyhiria Межигір'я
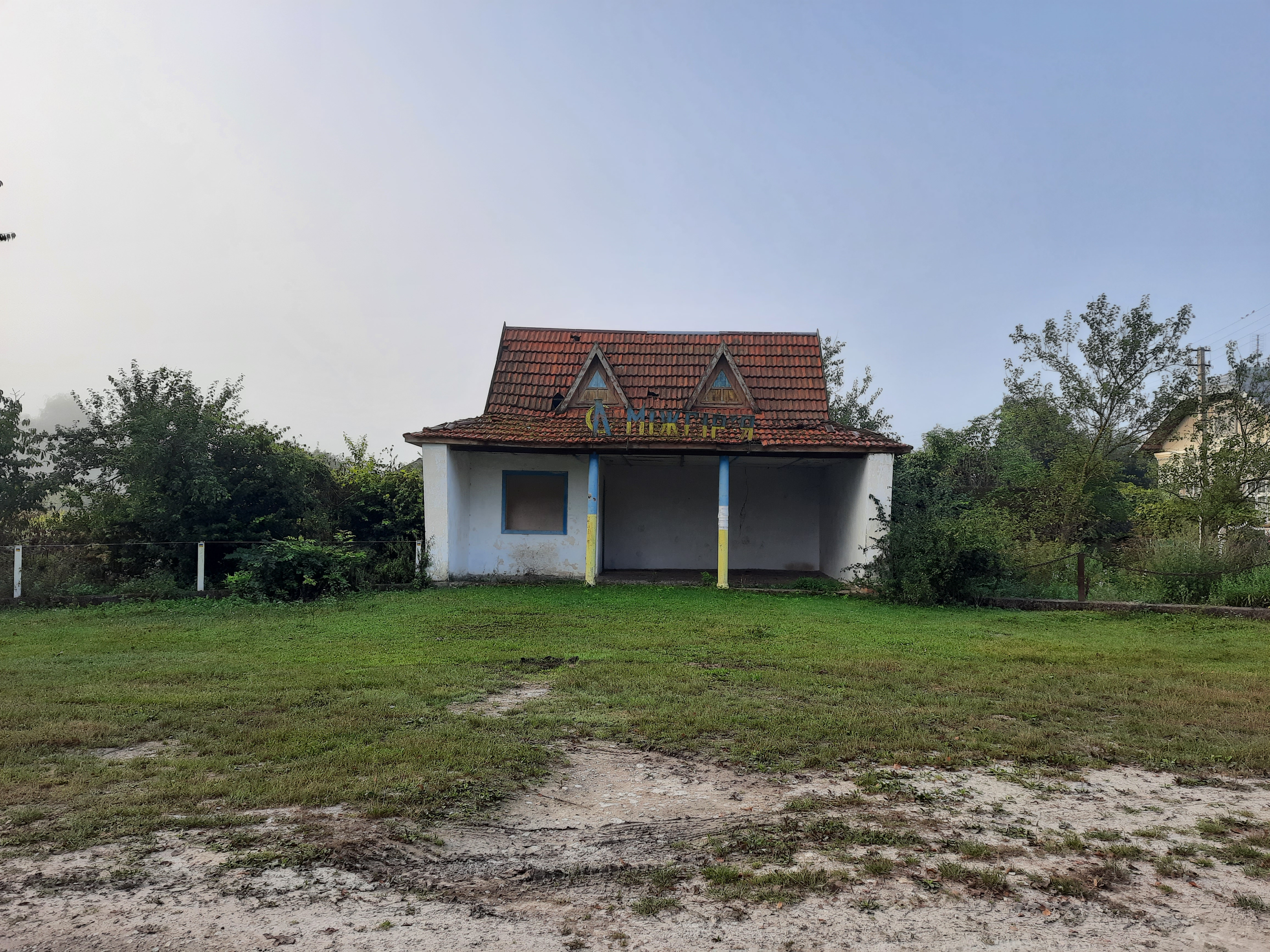
- Bus stop in Mezhyhiria

- Location in Ternopil Oblast
- Coordinates: 49°2′58″N 24°58′3″E
- Country: Ukraine
- Oblast: Ternopil Oblast
- Raion: Chortkiv Raion
- Hromada: Monastyryska urban hromada
- Time zone: UTC+2 (EET)
  - Summer (DST): UTC+3 (EEST)
- Postal code: 48341

Mezhyhiria (Ukrainian: Межигір'я) is a village in Monastyryska urban hromada, Chortkiv Raion, Ternopil Oblast, Ukraine.

== History ==
It is known from the 16th century.

After the liquidation of the Monastyryska Raion on 19 July 2020, the village became part of the Chortkiv Raion.

== Religion ==
- Church of the Intercession (1865, wooden, UGCC).

== Sources ==
- (in Ukrainian) Товстенюк О., Уніят Г., Міжгір'я // Ternopil Encyclopedic Dictionary: in 4 v. / editorial board: H. Yavorskyi and other, Ternopil: "Zbruch", 2005, V. 2: К—О, S. 526. — ISBN 966-528-199-2.
- "Międzygórze, wś, leży nad potokiem, dopływem Dniestru". Geographical Dictionary of the Kingdom of Poland (in Polish). 6. Warszawa: Kasa im. Józefa Mianowskiego. 1885. p. 374.
