= Liadske =

Rural locality in Ternopil Oblast, Ukraine

Liadske Лядське
- Location in Ternopil Oblast
- Coordinates: 49°0′34″N 25°4′15″E
- Country: Ukraine
- Oblast: Ternopil Oblast
- Raion: Chortkiv Raion
- Hromada: Monastyryska urban hromada
- Time zone: UTC+2 (EET)
  - Summer (DST): UTC+3 (EEST)
- Postal code: 48343

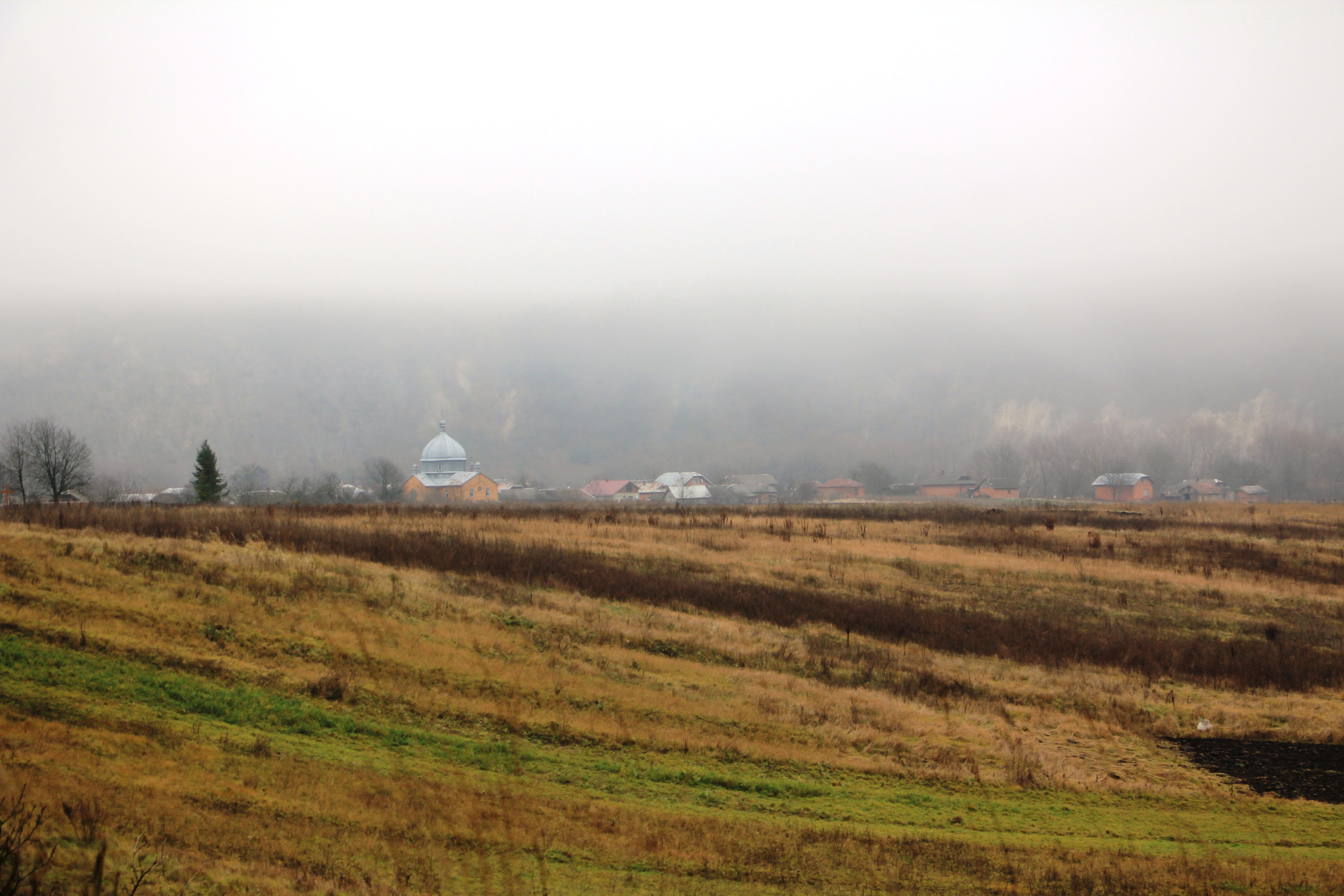
Liadske village

Liadske (Ukrainian: Лядське) is a village in Monastyryska urban hromada, Chortkiv Raion, Ternopil Oblast, Ukraine.

== History ==
It was first mentioned in writings in 1445.

After the liquidation of the Monastyryska Raion on 19 July 2020, the village became part of the Chortkiv Raion.

== Religion ==
- Church of the Assumption (1781, wooden).

== Sources ==
- (in Ukrainian) Шумега М., Уніят В., Лядське // Ternopil Encyclopedic Dictionary: in 4 v. / editorial board: H. Yavorskyi and other, Ternopil: "Zbruch", 2005, V. 2: К—О, S. 418. — ISBN 966-528-199-2.
- "Ladzkie (1), pow. buczacki". Geographical Dictionary of the Kingdom of Poland (in Polish). 5. Warszawa: Kasa im. Józefa Mianowskiego. 1884. p. 63.
- "Ladzkie". Geographical Dictionary of the Kingdom of Poland (in Polish). p. 209.
