= Kovalivka, Ternopil Oblast =

Rural locality in Ternopil Oblast, Ukraine

Kovalivka Ковалівка
- Location in Ternopil Oblast
- Coordinates: 49°8′6″N 25°12′9″E
- Country: Ukraine
- Oblast: Ternopil Oblast
- Raion: Chortkiv Raion
- Hromada: Monastyryska urban hromada
- Time zone: UTC+2 (EET)
  - Summer (DST): UTC+3 (EEST)
- Postal code: 48322

Kovalivka (Ukrainian: Ковалівка) is a village in Monastyryska urban hromada, Chortkiv Raion, Ternopil Oblast, Ukraine.

== History ==
It was first mentioned in writings in 1587.

After the liquidation of the Monastyryska Raion on 19 July 2020, the village became part of the Chortkiv Raion.

== Religion ==
- Saint Nicholas church (1801, wooden, burned down; 1926, brick),
- Roman Catholic Church of the Motherhood of the Blessed Virgin Mary (1864).

== Sources ==
- (in Ukrainian) Бражко В., Уніят В., Ковалівка // Ternopil Encyclopedic Dictionary: in 4 v. / editorial board: H. Yavorskyi and other, Ternopil: "Zbruch", 2005, V. 2: К—О, S. 108. — ISBN 966-528-199-2.
- "Kowalówka 1.), powiat buczacki". Geographical Dictionary of the Kingdom of Poland (in Polish). 4. Warszawa: Kasa im. Józefa Mianowskiego. 1883. p. 515.
