= Senkiv, Chortkiv Raion, Ternopil Oblast =

Rural locality in Ternopil Oblast, Ukraine

Senkiv Сеньків
- Location in Ternopil Oblast
- Coordinates: 49°3′35″N 24°59′48″E
- Country: Ukraine
- Oblast: Ternopil Oblast
- Raion: Chortkiv Raion
- Hromada: Monastyryska urban hromada
- Time zone: UTC+2 (EET)
  - Summer (DST): UTC+3 (EEST)
- Postal code: 48340

Senkiv (Ukrainian: Сеньків) is a village in Monastyryska urban hromada, Chortkiv Raion, Ternopil Oblast, Ukraine.

== History ==
Known from the 18th century.

After the liquidation of the Monastyryska Raion on 19 July 2020, the village became part of the Chortkiv Raion.

== Religion ==
- Church of the Nativity of the Blessed Virgin Mary (1993, brick).

== Sources ==
- (in Ukrainian) Уніят В., Ханас Вас., Сеньків // Ternopil Encyclopedic Dictionary: in 4 v. / editorial board: H. Yavorskyi and other, Ternopil: "Zbruch", 2008, V. 3: П—Я, S. 246. — ISBN 978-966-528-279-2.
- "Seńków 3.), grupa domów w Łuce". Geographical Dictionary of the Kingdom of Poland (in Polish). 10. Warszawa: Kasa im. Józefa Mianowskiego. 1889. p. 432.
