= Yuliian Pankevych =

Ukrainian painter, writer and activist (1863–1933)

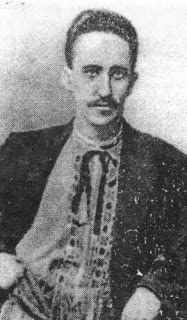
Yuliian Pankevych (before 1900)

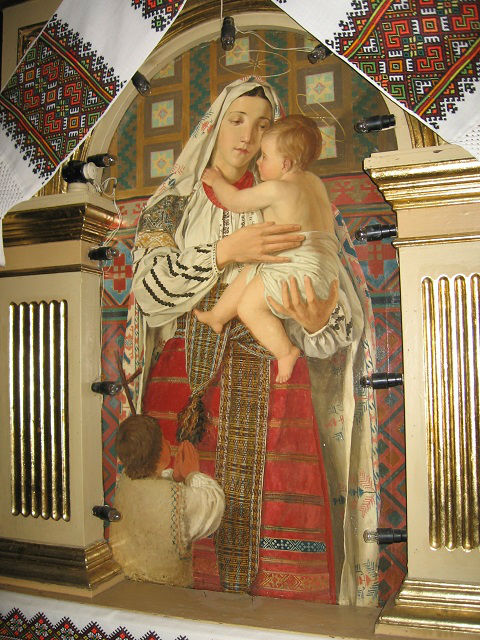
Madonna at the Church of St. Prophet Elijah in Borshchiv

Yuliian Yakovych Pankevych (Note: Also Yulian) (Ukrainian: Юліян Якович Паньке́вич; 4 June 1863 — Summer 1933) was a Ukrainian painter, writer, and activist. Sometimes, he went by the pseudonym, Простен Добромисл (roughly, "simple peasant"). He often gave free art lessons to children. He was also a talented violinist and singer and organized choral societies in small villages.

== Biography ==
Pankevych was born in the village of Ustia-Zelene His father, Yakiv, who was a church painter. He spent much of his childhood in Yezupil. In 1884, he graduated from the gymnasium in Berezhany. With financial assistance from the Dzieduszycki family, he was able to study at the Kraków Academy of Fine Arts under the direction of Jan Matejko. From 1885 to 1887, he continued his studies in Vienna. During the 1890s, he painted one of his best-known works; an iconostasis featuring the Madonna at the Church of St.Prophet Elijah in Borshchiv.

From 1892 to 1898, he worked in Stanyslaviv (now Ivano-Frankivsk) and the villages of Prykarpattia, where he organized choruses, gave art lessons, painted churches, and gathered folklore. After that, he lived in Lviv, where he became one of the co-founders and secretary of the Society for the Development of Russian Art. He organized several exhibitions; in 1898, 1900, and 1903. One of his students during this period was Mykhailo Boychuk, who would be executed during the Great Purge.

In 1903, he created illustrations for Chords, an anthology of Ukrainian folk lyrics, compiled and edited by Ivan Franko, who personally chose him for the assignment. The following year, he painted the only portrait of Franko done from life, as well as a portrait of Taras Shevchenko.

In 1918, he illustrated Баронський син в Америці (The Baroness' Son in America), a collection of fairy tales by Volodymyr Hnatiuk. Through his recommendation, Pankevych also did illustrations for works by Hnat Khotkevych. He wrote satirical couplets, fairy tales, stories, and newspaper articles.

In 1932, he accepted a position at the Fine Arts Museum Kharkiv. He died there in the summer of 1933, during the Holodomor famine. At the time, he was already ill and some sources indicate that he committed suicide.

Since 1993, there has been a small museum, named in his honor, at the gymnasium in Ustia-Zelene.

== Sources ==
- Панькевич Юліян // Encyclopedia of Ukraine. V. 5. P. 1938. ukr.
