= Honcharivka, Ternopil Oblast =

Rural locality in Ternopil Oblast, Ukraine

Honcharivka Гончарівка
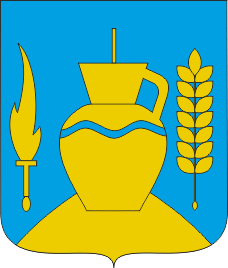
- Coat of arms

- Location in Ternopil Oblast
- Coordinates: 49°5′16″N 25°6′42″E
- Country: Ukraine
- Oblast: Ternopil Oblast
- Raion: Chortkiv Raion
- Hromada: Monastyryska urban hromada
- Time zone: UTC+2 (EET)
  - Summer (DST): UTC+3 (EEST)
- Postal code: 48332

Honcharivka (Ukrainian: Гончарівка; until 1946 – Vychulky Polish: Wyczółki) is a village in Monastyryska urban hromada, Chortkiv Raion, Ternopil Oblast, Ukraine.

== History ==
It was first mentioned in writings in 1515.

After the liquidation of the Monastyryska Raion on 19 July 2020, the village became part of the Chortkiv Raion.

== Religion ==
- St. Michael's church (1958, wooden; 1994, brick, UGCC).

== Sources ==
- (in Ukrainian) Горожанський П., Уніят В., Гончарівка // Ternopil Encyclopedic Dictionary: in 4 v. / editorial board: H. Yavorskyi and other, Ternopil: "Zbruch", 2005, V. 2: К—О, S. 390-391. — ISBN 966-528-199-2.
- "Wyczółki, pow. buczacki". Geographical Dictionary of the Kingdom of Poland (in Polish). 14. Warszawa: Kasa im. Józefa Mianowskiego. 1895. p. 76.
