= Velesniv =

Rural locality in Ternopil Oblast, Ukraine

Velesniv Велеснів
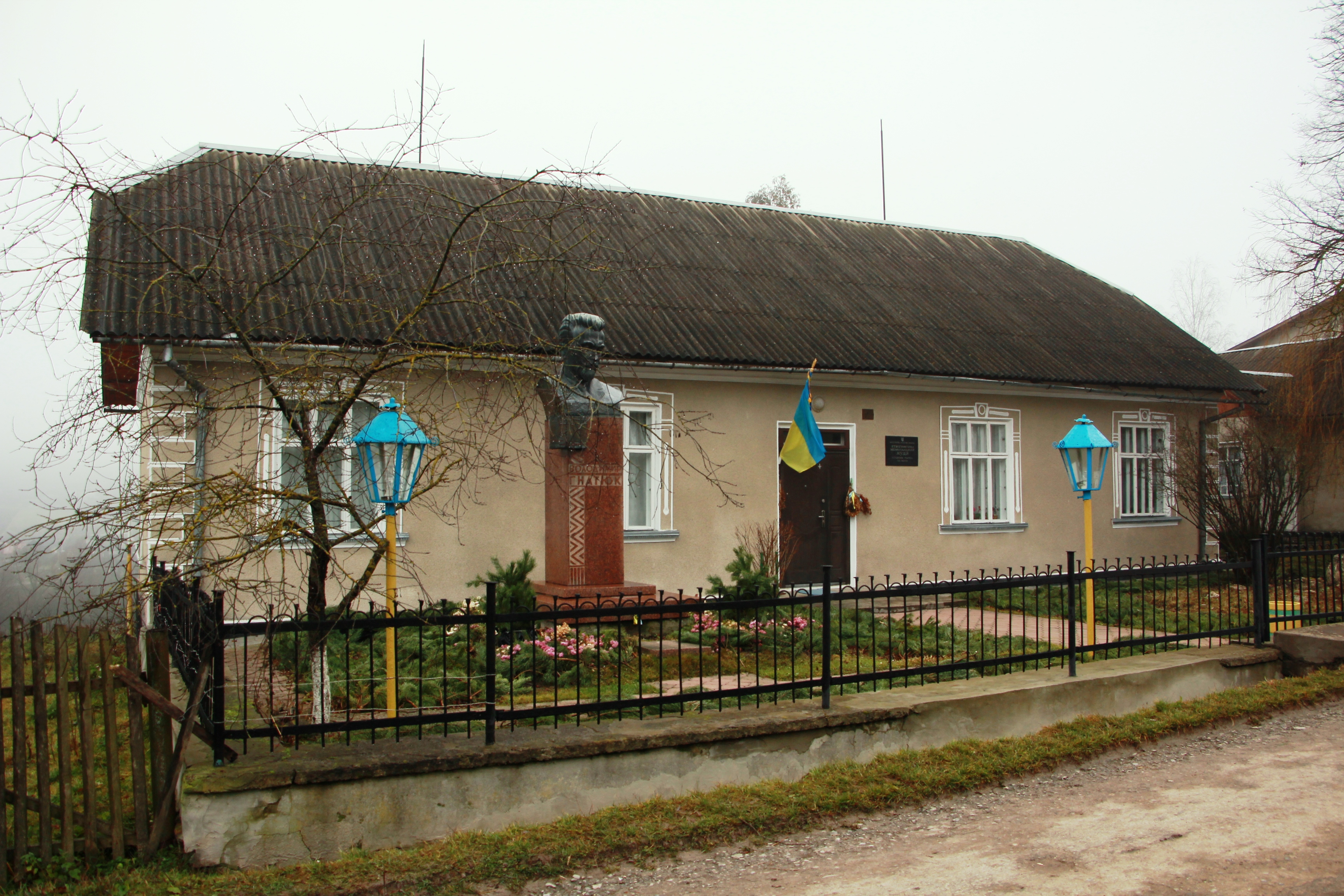
- Museum of Volodymyr Hnatiuk in Velesniv

- Location in Ternopil Oblast Velesniv (Ternopil Oblast)
- Coordinates: 49°1′40″N 25°10′46″E
- Country: Ukraine
- Oblast: Ternopil Oblast
- Raion: Chortkiv Raion
- Hromada: Monastyryska Hromada
- Time zone: UTC+2 (EET)
  - Summer (DST): UTC+3 (EEST)
- Postal code: 48351

Velesniv (Ukrainian: Велеснів; Polish: Weleśniów) is a village in Ukraine, Ternopil Oblast, Chortkiv Raion, Monastyryska urban hromada.

== History ==
The first written mention is from 1454.

== Religion ==
- Saint Nicholas church (1864; brick, restored 1992; renovated 1999, artist M. Dovhan, extension 2003)
- Roman Catholic chapel (1928)

== People ==
- Volodymyr Hnatiuk (1871–1926), writer, literary scholar, translator, and journalist, and was one of the most influential and notable Ukrainian ethnographers
