= Krynytsia, Ternopil Oblast =

Rural locality in Ternopil Oblast, Ukraine

Krynytsia Криниця
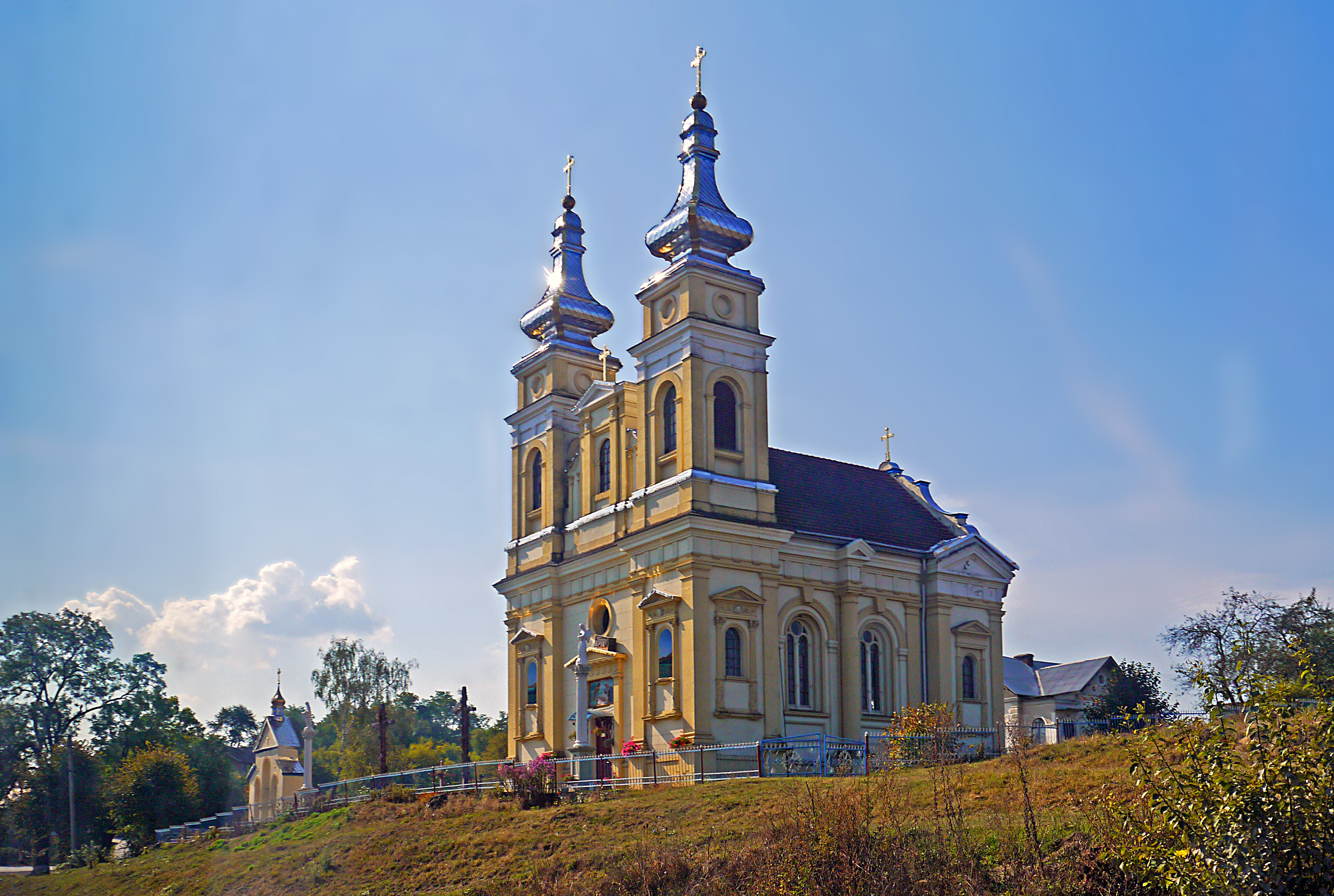
- Church of the Nativity of the Virgin Mary in Krynytsia, Ternopil Oblast

- Location in Ternopil Oblast
- Coordinates: 49°3′19″N 25°6′27″E
- Country: Ukraine
- Oblast: Ternopil Oblast
- Raion: Chortkiv Raion
- Hromada: Monastyryska Hromada
- Time zone: UTC+2 (EET)
  - Summer (DST): UTC+3 (EEST)
- Postal code: 48352

Krynytsia (Ukrainian: Криниця) is a village in Monastyryska urban hromada, Chortkiv Raion, Ternopil Oblast, Ukraine.

== History ==
The first written mention is from 1454.

== Religion ==
- Church of the Nativity of the Blessed Virgin Mary (building of the Roman Catholic Church, 1899)

== Sources ==
- "Korościatyn". Geographical Dictionary of the Kingdom of Poland (in Polish). 4. Warszawa: Kasa im. Józefa Mianowskiego. 1883. p. 415.
