= Horozhanka Castle =

Castle in Horozhanka, Ternopil Oblast, Ukraine

- Горожанківський замок

General information
- Location: Horozhanka, Chortkiv Raion, Ternopil Oblast
- Country: Ukraine
- Coordinates: 49°09′00.0″N 24°55′00.3″E

Horozhanka Castle (Ukrainian: Горожанківський замок) is a defensive castle built in Horozhanka, Ternopil Oblast, Ukraine. Built in the 16th century by the Makowiecki family of Pomian coat of arms.

== Location, history ==
The stronghold was located on the western bank of the Horozhanka River, which is a tributary of the Dniester. The castle was destroyed during many wars and invasions, after which it was always put up again.

== Architecture ==
Coarsely hewn stone was used to build the castle. The stronghold, built on a rectangular plan, consisted of a residential building with towers at the corners, which was surrounded by a sizable rampart and moat. The building was accessed by a hallway passing into a corridor. From the corridor one could access a couple of rooms. The entrance to the castle led over a drawbridge. Under the residential building there were cellars with an escape tunnel to the forest 5 km long. In subsequent years, the entrance to the tunnel was walled up. In the 19th century, the medieval drawbridge was dismantled, the earthen ramparts were leveled and the moats were filled in.

== Court ==
Over the centuries, the fortress turned into a ruin, on the remains of which a mansion was built. A second storey made of brick and wood was added to the old storey made of hewn stone. The remnants of the towers were converted into bastion rooms and the whole was covered with a hipped roof. The first floor of the centuries-old castle and the Gothic cellars became the decoration of the newly built mansion. At the beginning of the 19th century, the estate belonged to the Chojecki family, and then to Stanisław Malinowski from 1850, of the Ślepowron coat of arms, who had three daughters. Horozhanka fell to Joanna, who married Ignacy Romanowski h. Bożawola. In 1912 the estate was inherited by her son, Aleksander Romanowski, who died in Tehran in 1942.

== Bibliography ==
- (in Ukrainian) Бойко В., Горбаль Б., Уніят В., Федечко М., Горожанка // Ternopil region. History of cities and villages: in 3 v. / Ternopil: "Terno-graph", 2014, V. 3: М—Ш, S. 43—45. — ISBN 978-966-457-246-7.
- Roman Aftanazy, Dzieje rezydencji na dawnych kresach Rzeczypospolitej. Województwo ruskie, Ziemia Halicka i Lwowska, T. 7, wyd. 2 przejrzane i uzupełnione, Zakład Narodowy im. Ossolińskich, Wrocław, Warszawa, 1995, ISBN 83-04-03701-7 całość, ISBN 83-04-04229-0 t. 7, ss. 74–76.
