= Olesha, Ternopil Oblast =

Coordinates: 49°7′42″N 25°15′40″E

Olesha (Ukrainian: Оле́ша) is a village in Chortkiv Raion, Ternopil Oblast, western Ukraine. During the 2020 administrative-territorial reform, it was included in the Monastyryska urban hromada.

According to the 2001 Ukraine Census, it had population of 363.

It has the Ukrainian Greek Catholic St. Michael's Church.

== History ==
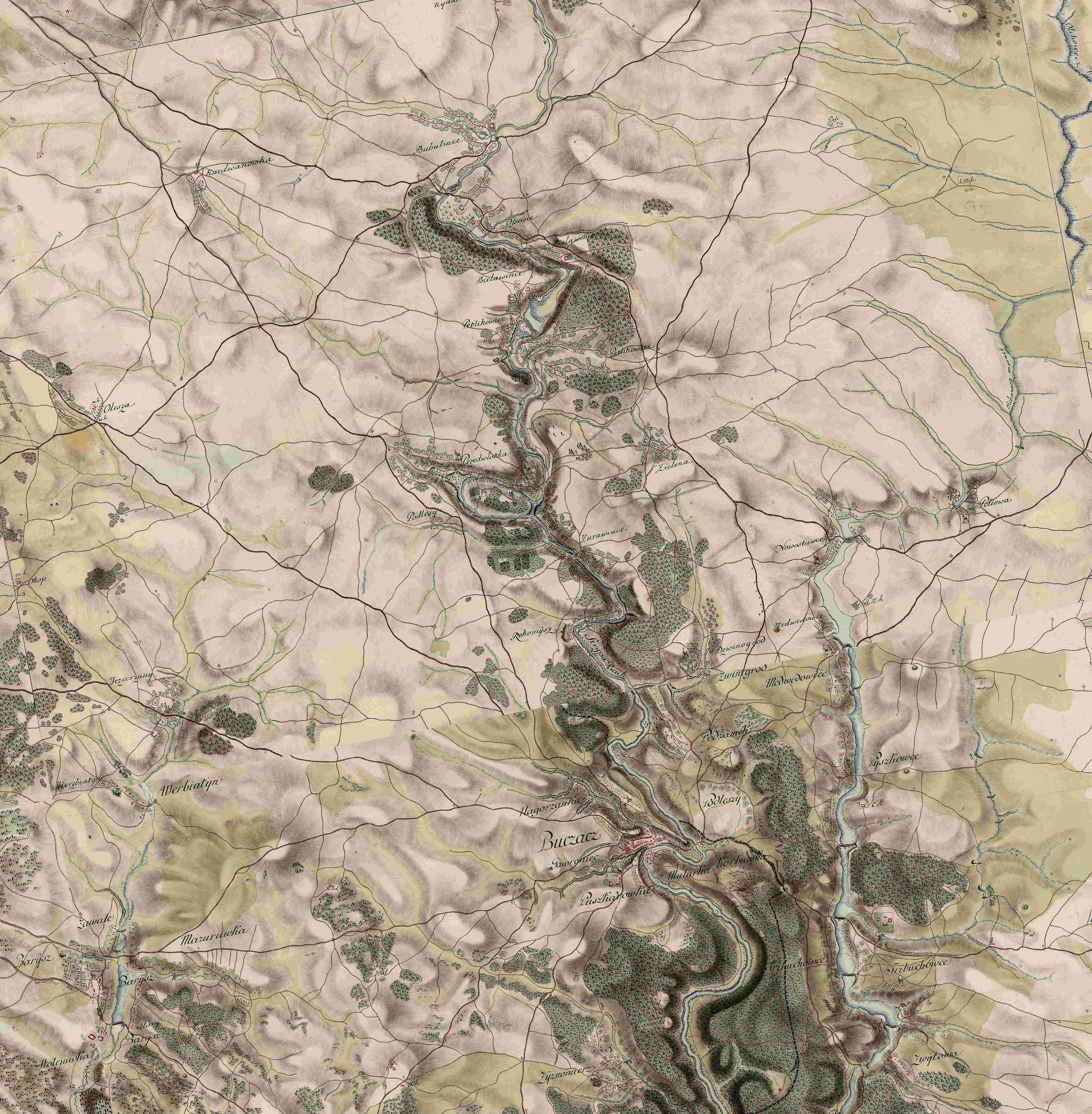
An 18th century map of Buchach area showing Olesha, its church and cemetery

In Congress Poland in the 1890s, it was part of Powiat Buczacki (Buchach powiat)

During 1962–1966 it belonged to Buchach Raion.
