= Hranitne, Ternopil Oblast =

Rural locality in Ternopil Oblast, Ukraine

Hranitne Гранітне
- Location in Ternopil Oblast
- Coordinates: 49°5′0″N 25°1′0″E
- Country: Ukraine
- Oblast: Ternopil Oblast
- Raion: Chortkiv Raion
- Hromada: Monastyryska urban hromada
- Time zone: UTC+2 (EET)
  - Summer (DST): UTC+3 (EEST)
- Postal code: 48331

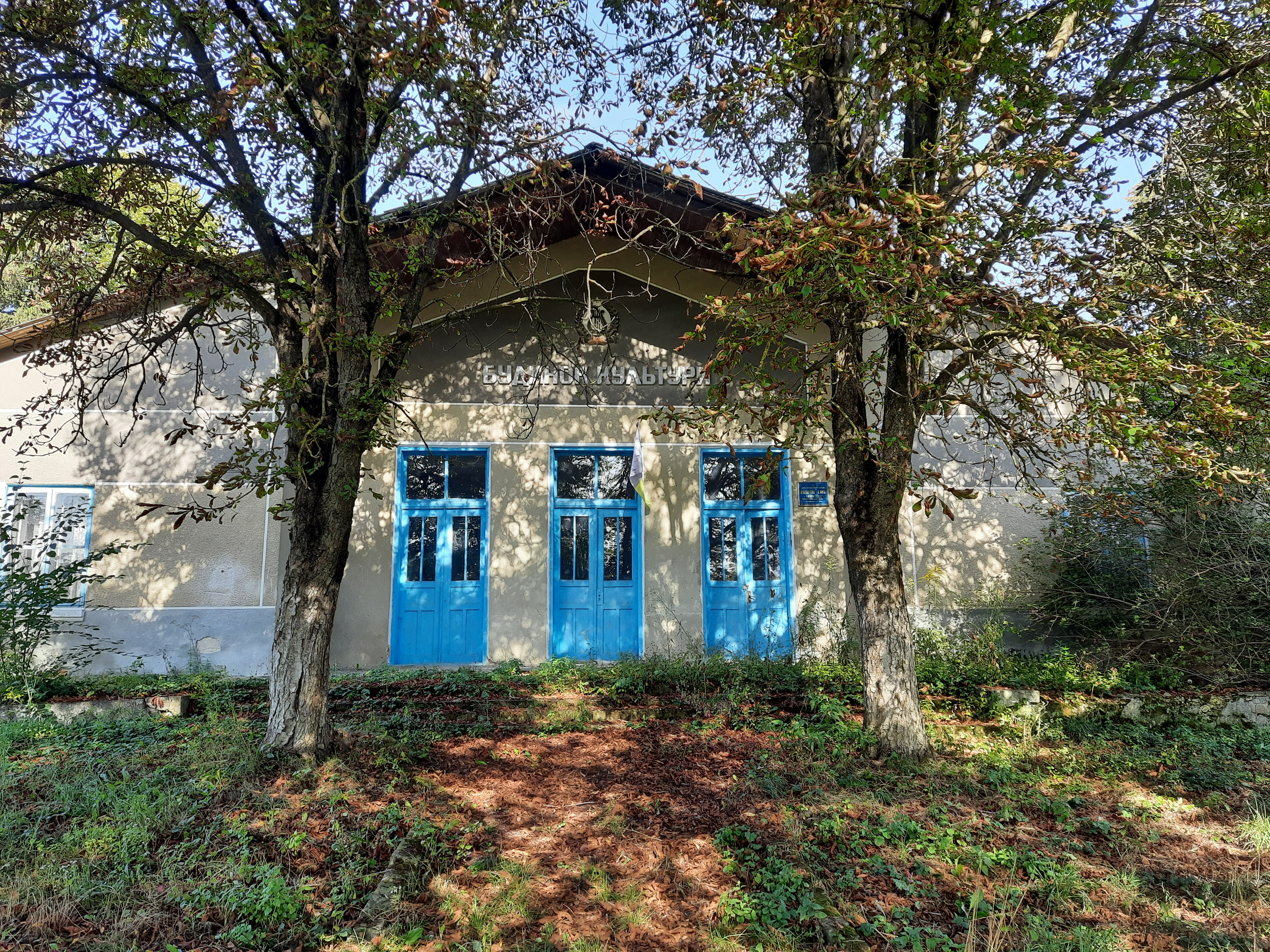
House of Culture in Hranitne village, Ternopil region.

Hranitne (Ukrainian: Гранітне; until 1964 – Baraniv) is a village in Monastyryska urban hromada, Chortkiv Raion, Ternopil Oblast, Ukraine.

== History ==
It was first mentioned in writings in 1461.

After the liquidation of the Monastyryska Raion on 19 July 2020, the village became part of the Chortkiv Raion.

== Religion ==
- St. Demetrius church (1855; wooden, restored in 1986).

== Sources ==
- (in Ukrainian) Пасічник В., Уніят В., Гранітне // Ternopil Encyclopedic Dictionary: in 4 v. / editorial board: H. Yavorskyi and other, Ternopil: "Zbruch", 2004, V. 1: А—Й, S. 410. — ISBN 966-528-197-6.
- "Baranów, wś, pow. buczacki". Geographical Dictionary of the Kingdom of Poland (in Polish). 1. Warszawa: Kasa im. Józefa Mianowskiego. 1880. p. 103.
