= Podlesnoye =

Podlesnoye Подлесное
- Village
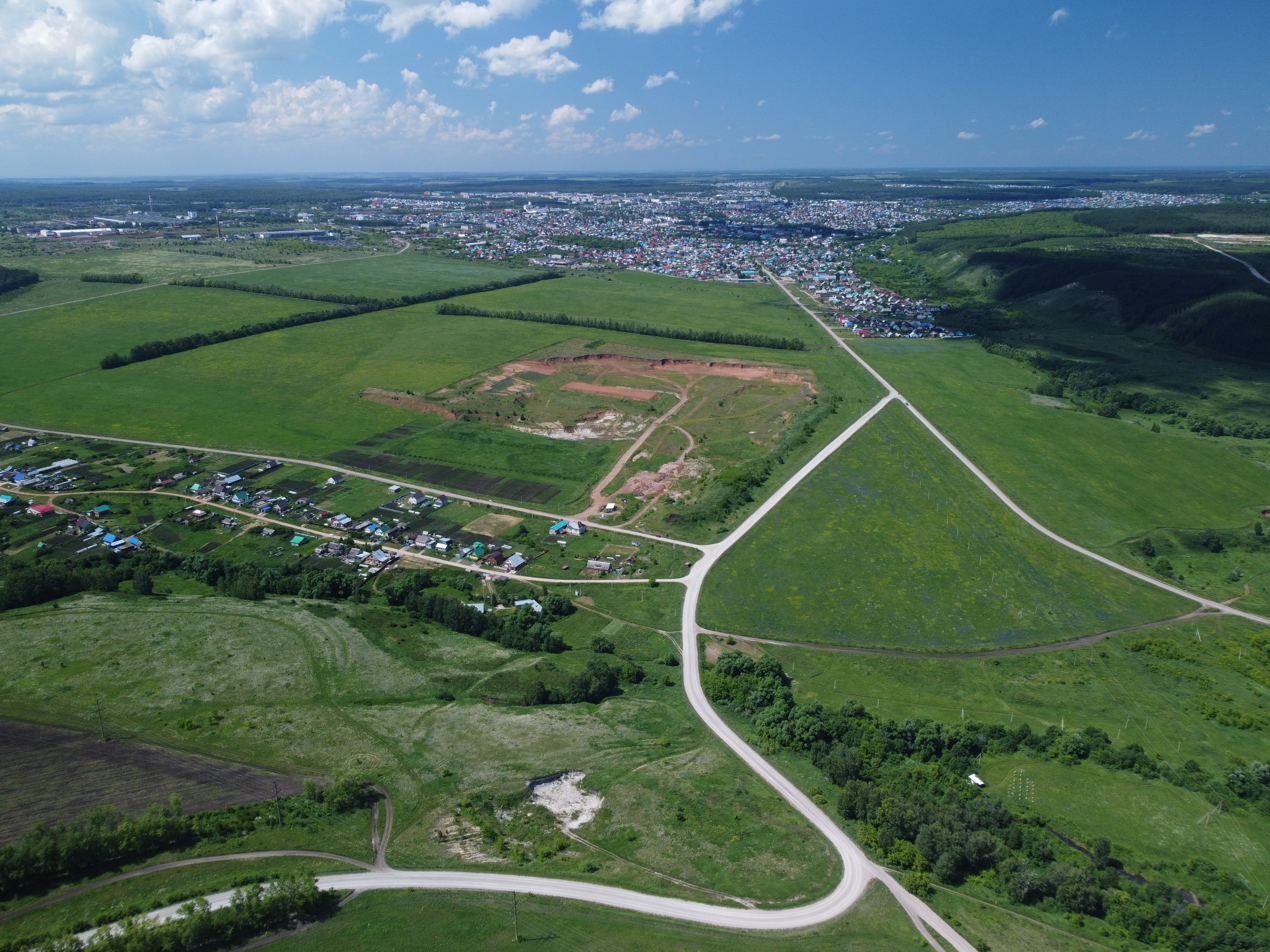

- Location within Bashkortostan Location within Russia
- Coordinates: 54°06′N 54°10′E
- Country: Russia
- Region: Bashkortostan
- District: Belebeyevsky District
- Time zone: UTC+5:00

Podlesnoye (Russian: Подлесное) is a rural locality (a village) in Donskoy Selsoviet, Belebeyevsky District, Bashkortostan, Russia. The population was 138 as of 2010. There are 3 streets.

== Geography ==
Podlesnoye is located 7 km east of Belebey (the district's administrative centre) by road. Belebey is the nearest rural locality.
