= Monastyryska urban hromada =

Urban hromada in Ternopil Oblast, Ukraine

Monastyryska urban hromada Монастириська міська громада
- hromada
- Location within Ternopil Oblast Location within Ukraine
- Coordinates: 49°5′18″N 25°10′0″E
- Country: Ukraine
- Oblast: Ternopil Oblast
- Raion: Chortkiv Raion
- Administrative center: Monastyryska

Government
  - Hromada head: Andrii Starukh

Area
  - Total: 472.7 km^{2} (182.5 sq mi)

Population (2022)
  - Total: 19,025
- City: 1
- Villages: 39
- Website: monastyryskarada.gov.ua

Monastyryska urban territorial hromada (Ukrainian: Монастириська територіальна громада, romanized: Monastyryska miska terytorialna hromada) is a hromada in Ukraine, in Chortkiv Raion of Ternopil Oblast. The administrative center is the city of Monastyryska. Its population is 19,025 (2022 estimate)

== History ==
It was formed on 22 August 2018, by amalgamation of Monastyryska city council and Honcharivka, Horishnia Slobidka, Dubenka, Kovalivka, Komarivka, Krynytsia village councils of Monastyryska Raion.

== Settlements ==
The hromada consists of 1 city (Monastyryska) and 36 villages:

- Bertnyky
- Bobrivnyky
- Velesniv
- Vysoke
- Honcharivka
- Horishnia Slobidka
- Horozhanka
- Hranitne
- Hryhoriv
- Dobrovody
- Dubenka
- Zavadivka
- Zadariv
- Zalissia
- Zastavtsi
- Zatyshne
- Kovalivka
- Komarivka
- Korzhova
- Krasiiv
- Krynytsia
- Lazarivka
- Luka
- Liadske
- Markova
- Mezhyhiria
- Nyzkolyzy
- Nova Huta
- Olesha
- Pidlisne
- Ridkolissia
- Sadzhivka
- Savelivka
- Senkiv
- Trostiantsi
- Ustia-Zelene
- Chekhiv
- Shveikiv
- Yarhoriv
