= Kovalyovka, Volgograd Oblast =

Kovalyovka Ковалёвка
- Selo
- Location within Volgograd Oblast Location within Russia
- Coordinates: 47°56′N 43°48′E
- Country: Russia
- Region: Volgograd Oblast
- District: Oktyabrsky District
- Time zone: UTC+4:00

Kovalyovka (Russian: Ковалёвка) is a rural locality (a selo) in Kovalyovskoye Rural Settlement, Oktyabrsky District, Volgograd Oblast, Russia. The population was 308 as of 2010. There are 6 streets.

== Geography ==
Kovalyovka is located in steppe, on Yergeni, on the bank of the Aksay River, 19 km southeast of Oktyabrsky (the district's administrative centre) by road. Zhutovo 1-ye is the nearest rural locality.
