= Monastyryska Raion =

Former subdivision of Ternopil Oblast, Ukraine

Monastyryska Raion Монастириський район
- Raion
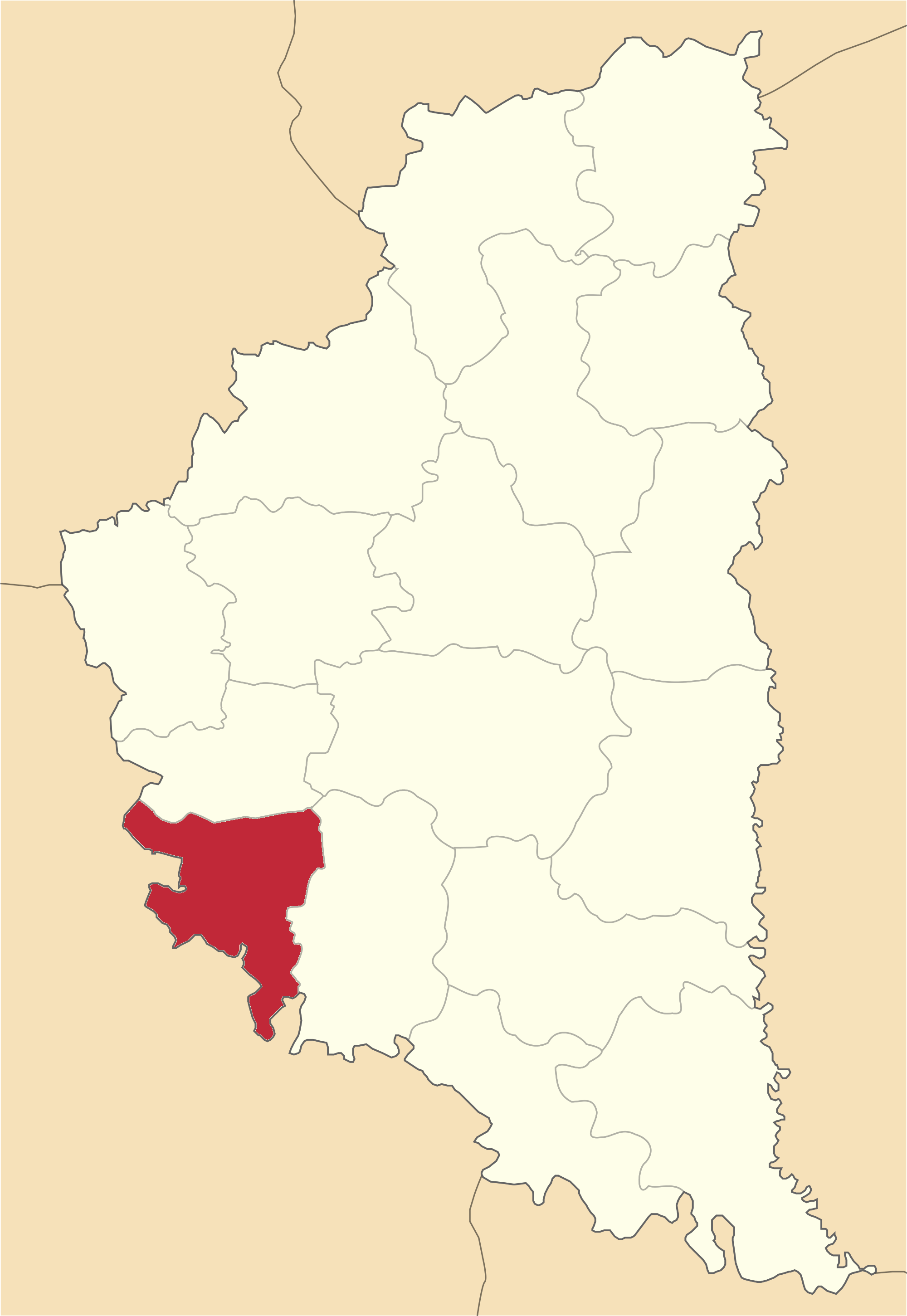
- Coordinates: 49°05′N 25°04′E
- Country: Ukraine
- Region: Ternopil Oblast
- Established: 1939
- Disestablished: 18 July 2020
- Admin. center: Monastyryska
- Subdivisions: List: — city councils; — settlement councils; — rural councils; Number of localities: — cities; — urban-type settlements; 46 — villages; — rural settlements

Area
  - Total: 0.558 km^{2} (0.215 sq mi)

Population (2020)
  - Total: 25,889
  - Density: 46,400/km^{2} (120,000/sq mi)
- Time zone: UTC+02:00 (EET)
  - Summer (DST): UTC+03:00 (EEST)
- Area code: 380-3555

Monastyryska Raion (Ukrainian: Монастириський район) was a raion (district) in Ternopil Oblast in western Ukraine. Its administrative center was the city of Monastyryska. The raion was abolished on 18 July 2020, as part of an administrative reform in Ukraine, which reduced the number of raions of Ternopil Oblast to three. The area of Monastyryska Raion was merged into Chortkiv Raion. The last estimate of the raion population was 25,889 (2020 est.).

The raion was created in 1939, after the invasion of Poland, when Poland was partitioned between Nazi Germany and Soviet Union. Monastyryska Raion was created out of the former Polish Buchach County. Several years later, it was abolished following the invasion of the Soviet Union by Nazi Germany. The raion was reinstated in 1944 after return of the Soviet regime.

== Subdivisions ==
At the time of its disestablishment, the raion consisted of two hromadas:

- Koropets settlement hromada with the administration in the urban-type settlement of Koropets;
- Monastyryska urban hromada with the administration in Monastyryska.

== People from Monastyryska Raion ==
- Volodymyr Hnatiuk – (1871–1926), writer, literary scholar, translator, and journalist, and was one of the most influential and notable Ukrainian ethnographers.

== See also ==
- Subdivisions of Ukraine
