= Duchy of Bukovina =

Austrian crown land (1849–1918)

Duchy of Bukovina Herzogtum Bukowina or Herzogtum Buchenland (German) Ducatul Bucovinei (Romanian) Герцогство Буковина (Ukrainian)
- 1849–1918
- Flag Coat of arms
- Royal anthem: Kaiserhymne
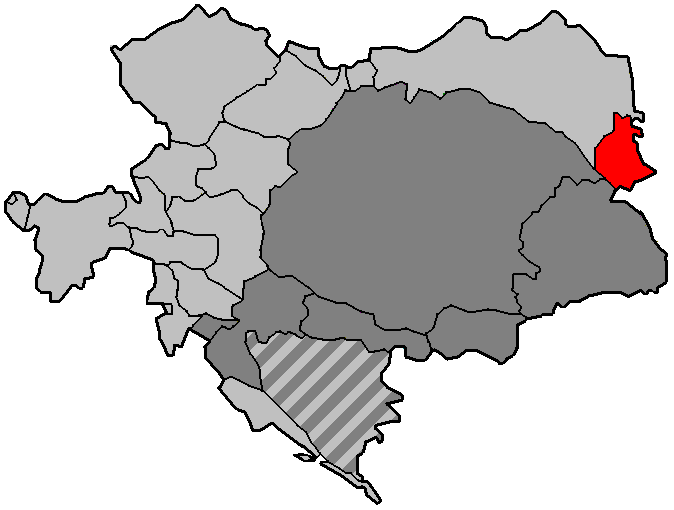
- The Duchy of Bukovina within Austria-Hungary
- Status: Land of the Austrian Empire (1849–1867); Crown land of Cisleithania (1867–1918)
- Capital: Czernowitz (Cernăuți / Chernivtsi)
- Official languages: German; Romanian; Ruthenian
- Common languages: German, Romanian, Ukrainian
- Government: Constitutional Monarchy (1861–1918)
  - Grand Duke of Bukovina: Franz Joseph I (1849–1916); Charles I (1916–1918)
- Landespräsident
  - 1849: Eduard von Bach
  - 1917–1918: Josef Graf von Ezdorf
- History
  - Annexation of northwestern Moldavia by the Habsburg monarchy and integration into the Kingdom of Galicia and Lodomeria as the Bukovina District: 1775
  - Establishment of the Duchy of Bukovina: 4 March 1849
  - Declaration of Union with Romania: 28 November 1918
  - Treaty of Saint Germain: 10 September 1919

Area
  - Total: 10,442 km^{2} (4,032 sq mi)
Preceded by	Succeeded by
Bukovina District	Kingdom of Romania
- Today part of: Romania; Ukraine

The Duchy of Bukovina (German: Herzogtum Bukowina or Herzogtum Buchenland; Romanian: Ducatul Bucovinei; Ukrainian: Герцогство Буковина, romanized: Hertsohstvo Bukovyna) was a constituent land of the Austrian Empire from 1849 and a Cisleithanian crown land of Austria-Hungary from 1867 until 1918.

== Name ==
The name Bukovina came into official use in 1775 with the region's annexation from the Principality of Moldavia to the possessions of the Habsburg monarchy (which became the Austrian Empire in 1804, and Austria-Hungary in 1867).

The official German name, die Bukowina, of the province under Austrian rule (1775–1918), was derived from the Polish form Bukowina, which in turn was derived from the Ukrainian word, Буковина (Bukovyna), and the common Slavic form of buk, meaning beech tree (бук [buk] as, for example, in Ukrainian or, even, Buche in German). Another German name for the region, das Buchenland, is mostly used in poetry, and means "beech land", or "the land of beech trees". In Romanian, in literary or poetic contexts, the name Țara Fagilor ("the land of beech trees") is sometimes used.

In English, an alternative form is The Bukovina, increasingly an archaism, which, however, is found in older literature.

== History ==
After the Mongol invasion of Europe, the Bukovina lands since the 14th century had been part of the Principality of Moldavia, with Suceava being the princely capital from 1388 to 1565. In the 16th century, Moldavia came under Ottoman suzerainty, but still retaining its autonomy. During the early 18th century, Moldavia became the target of the Russian Empire's southwards expansion, inaugurated by Tsar Peter the Great during the Pruth River Campaign of 1710–11. In 1769, during the Russo-Turkish War of 1768–74, Moldavia was occupied by the Imperial Russian Army.

=== Austrian rule ===
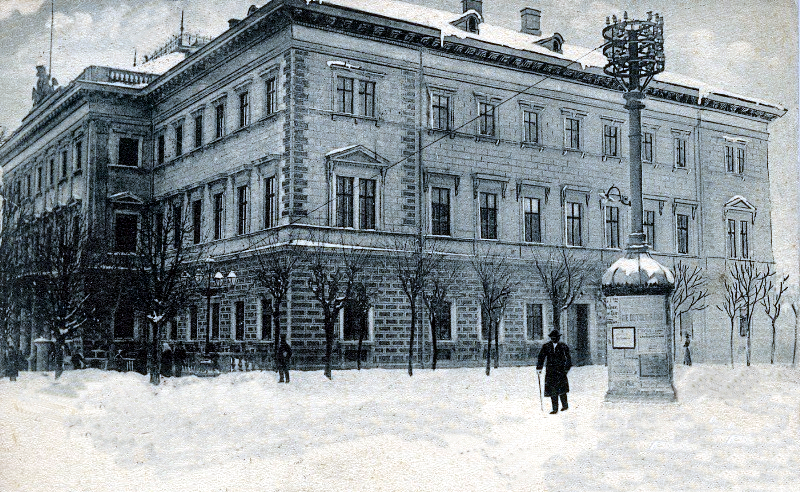
Czernowitz: Seat of the Bukovina provincial government, about 1900

Following the First Partition of Poland in 1772, the Habsburg monarchy had aimed at a land connection from the Principality of Transylvania to the newly acquired Kingdom of Galicia and Lodomeria. After the Russo-Turkish Treaty of Küçük Kaynarca was concluded in July 1774, the Austrians entered into negotiations with the Sublime Porte from October and could finally obtain a territory of Moldavia with an area of about 10,000 square kilometres (ca. 4,000 square miles) they called Bukowina, which they formally annexed in January 1775. On 2 July 1776, at Palamutka, Austrians and Ottomans signed a border convention, the Habsburg monarchy giving back 59 of the previously occupied villages, and remaining with 278 villages. For opposing and protesting the annexation of the northwestern part of Moldavia, the Moldavian ruler Prince Grigore III Ghica was assassinated by the Ottomans.

Bukovina at first was a closed military district from 1775 until 1786, and then was incorporated as the largest district, the Bukovina District, of the Austrian constituent Kingdom of Galicia and Lodomeria. So far, the Moldavian nobility had traditionally formed the ruling class in that territory. The Habsburg emperor Joseph II wished to affiliate the region with the provinces of the Austrian monarchy (though not with the Holy Roman Empire); he had the devastated lands colonised by Danube Swabians, later known as Bukovina Germans. In the mid 19th century the town of Sadhora became the centre of the Hasidic Sadigura dynasty. The immigration process promoted the further economic development of the multi-ethnic country, though it remained a remote eastern outpost of the Danube Monarchy.

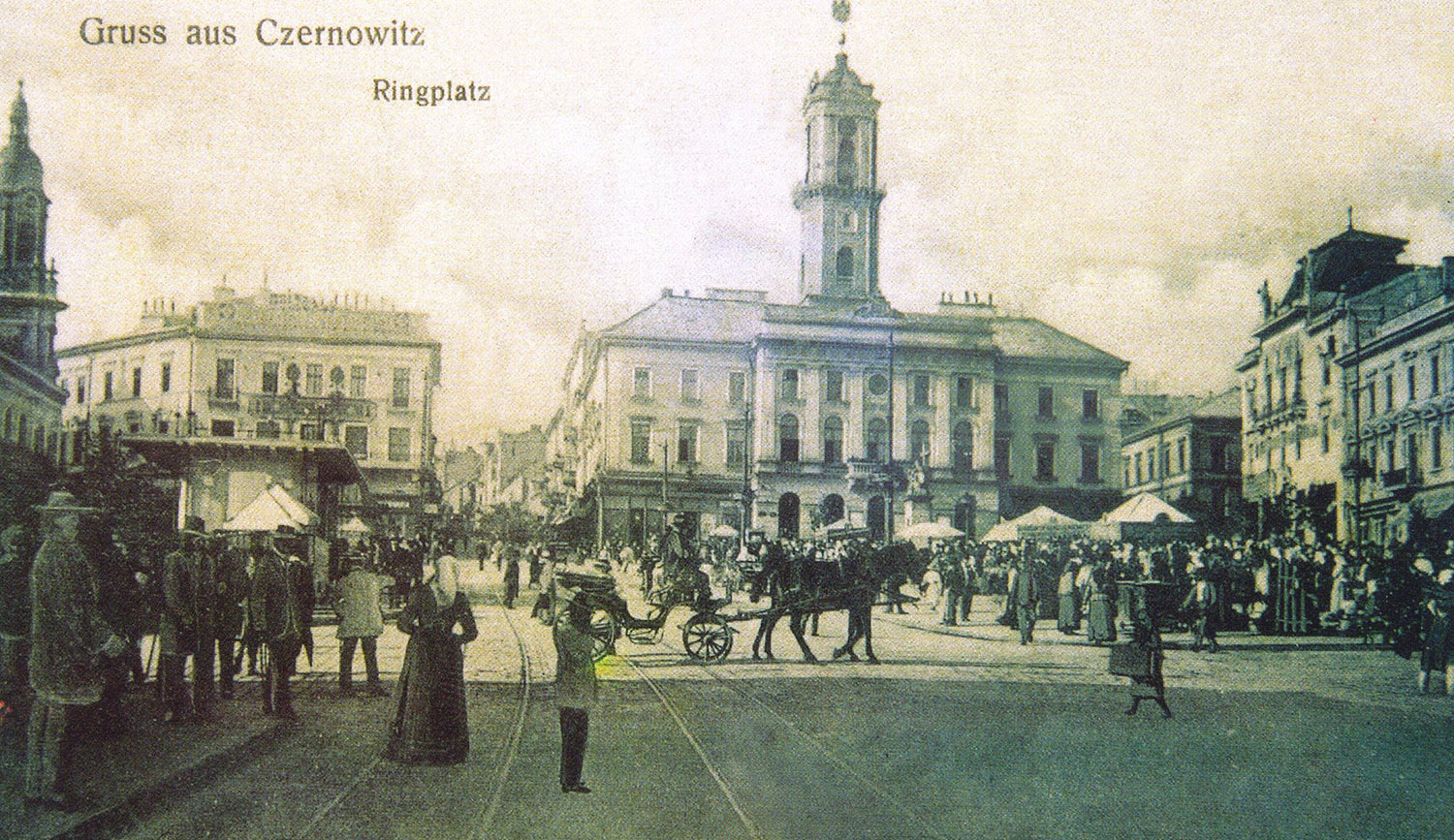
Czernowitz: main square and town hall

In 1804, the region became part of the newly established Austrian Empire. After the political turmoil of the 1848 revolutions, the estates urged the Vienna government to elevate the Bukovina to a separate Austrian Kronland (crown land). With effect of 4 March 1849, the former Kreis was declared the Herzogtum Bukowina, a nominal duchy as part of the official full style of the Austrian emperor. It was governed by a k.k. Statthalter (stadtholder) appointed by the emperor, with his official residence at Czernowitz from 1850.

In 1860 the Bukovina was again amalgamated with Galicia, but reinstated as a separate province once again according to the 1861 February Patent issued by Emperor Franz Joseph I. The reinstated crown land received its own Landtag diet including a Landesausschuss executive authority, a status that would last until 1918. In 1867, with the re-organisation of the Austrian Empire as the Austro-Hungarian Empire, it became part of the Cisleithanian ("Austrian") territories. Upon the promulgation of the December Constitution, the Imperial Council, on the initiative of the Cisleithanian Citizens' Ministry led by Karl von Auersperg, decided to confer the title Landespräsident on the former stadtholder, heading a Landesregierung (state government). Nine (from 1907 elections: 14) delegates represented the Bukovina in the Austrian House of Deputies.

Between 1870–1871, Bukovina Romanian Alexander Petrino served as the Agriculture Minister in the Potocki Cabinet, being the only Bukovinan and Romanian to hold this office.

=== First World War ===
The main military force in the region during peacetime was the 22nd Infantry Regiment at Czernowitz, at that time the only k.k. Landwehr regiment with a Romanian majority (54%). As soon as hostilities began, however, new units were formed from the locally recruited population. The 22nd, 23rd and 41st Landwehr Regiments, along with the 4th Dragoons regiment all had Romanian majority. To encourage recruitment, the Romanians were allowed to wear their national colors as well as receiving spiritual guidance by ethnic-Romanian military priests.

In 1914–15 large parts of the Bukovina were occupied by the Russian 8th Army under General Aleksei Brusilov after the Austro-Hungarian defeat in the Battle of Galicia and could only be regained by the united forces of the Central Powers after the German-led Gorlice–Tarnów Offensive and the Russian Great Retreat. The Romanian troops fought bravely, 62 being awarded the Medal for Bravery. In one instance, the 41st Regiment fought for 54 hours continuously. By 4 June 1916, The Bukovinian Romanian casualties were 184 killed, 1175 wounded and 82 captured.

In the autumn of 1918, the multi-ethnic state of Austria-Hungary collapsed and the Ministry of War officially ordered demobilization, though no central authority was able to ensure the decommissioning of arms. On 18 October 1918, the Ukrainian National Council established in Lemberg, Galicia, planned to declare a Ukrainian Republic that would also incorporate the Bukovina and Carpathian Ruthenia. On 25 October 1918, a Ukrainian regional committee, led by Emilian Popowicz, was established in Czernowitz to represent the Ukrainian National Council in Bukovina. On 14/27 October 1918, at the initiative of Sextil Pușcariu, Iancu Flondor, and Isidor Bodea, the Constituent Assembly of Bukovina established, in Czernowitz, the Romanian National Council (consisting of representatives from the Austrian parliament and from the Bukovina diet, and local political activists), which adopted a declaration to support the union of Bukovina with Romania, and demanded the last Austrian Landespräsident governor Josef Graf Etzdorf to cede his power.

In the meantime, the local paramilitary forces of the Ukrainian National Council took control over Czernowitz and other parts of Bukovina, effectively supplanting Austrian control by the 6th of November. Although local Ukrainians attempted to incorporate Bukovina into the so-called West Ukrainian People's Republic, they were not able to set up an administration. In the light of Ukrainians' actions, the Romanian National Council leader Iancu Flondor, request the Romanian government to intervene in Bukovina. Five days later, the Romanian 8th Division, led by General Iacob Zadik, entered Czernowitz, against Ukrainian protests, while the Ukrainian paramilitary forces withdrew without resistance to Galicia. Further attempts by local Ukrainians to incorporate parts of northern Bukovina into the West Ukrainian People's Republic were swiftly suppressed by the troops, with the leadership of the Ukrainian National Council fleeing across the Dniester River, to Galicia, which was partially under Ukrainian military control.

After the Romanian troops secured the region, a General Congress of Bukovina was established on 15/28 November 1918, which counted among its members 74 Romanians, 13 Ruthenians, 7 Germans, and 6 Poles were elected (this is the linguistic composition, and Jews were not recorded as a separate group). A popular enthusiasm sprang throughout the region, and a large number of people gathered in the city to wait for the resolution of the Congress. The Congress elected the Romanian Bukovinian politician Iancu Flondor as chairman, and voted for the union with the Kingdom of Romania, with the support of the Romanian, German, and Polish representatives; Ukrainian representatives boycotted the Congress. The reasons stated were that, until its takeover by the Habsburg in 1775, Bukovina was the heart of the Principality of Moldavia (where the voivods' burial sites are located), and right of self-determination.

Romanian control of the province was recognized internationally in the Treaty of St. Germain, in 1919, and the Treaty of Trianon, in 1920, when both the Republic of German-Austria and the Kingdom of Hungary renounced all claims to the Bukovina.

== Administration ==
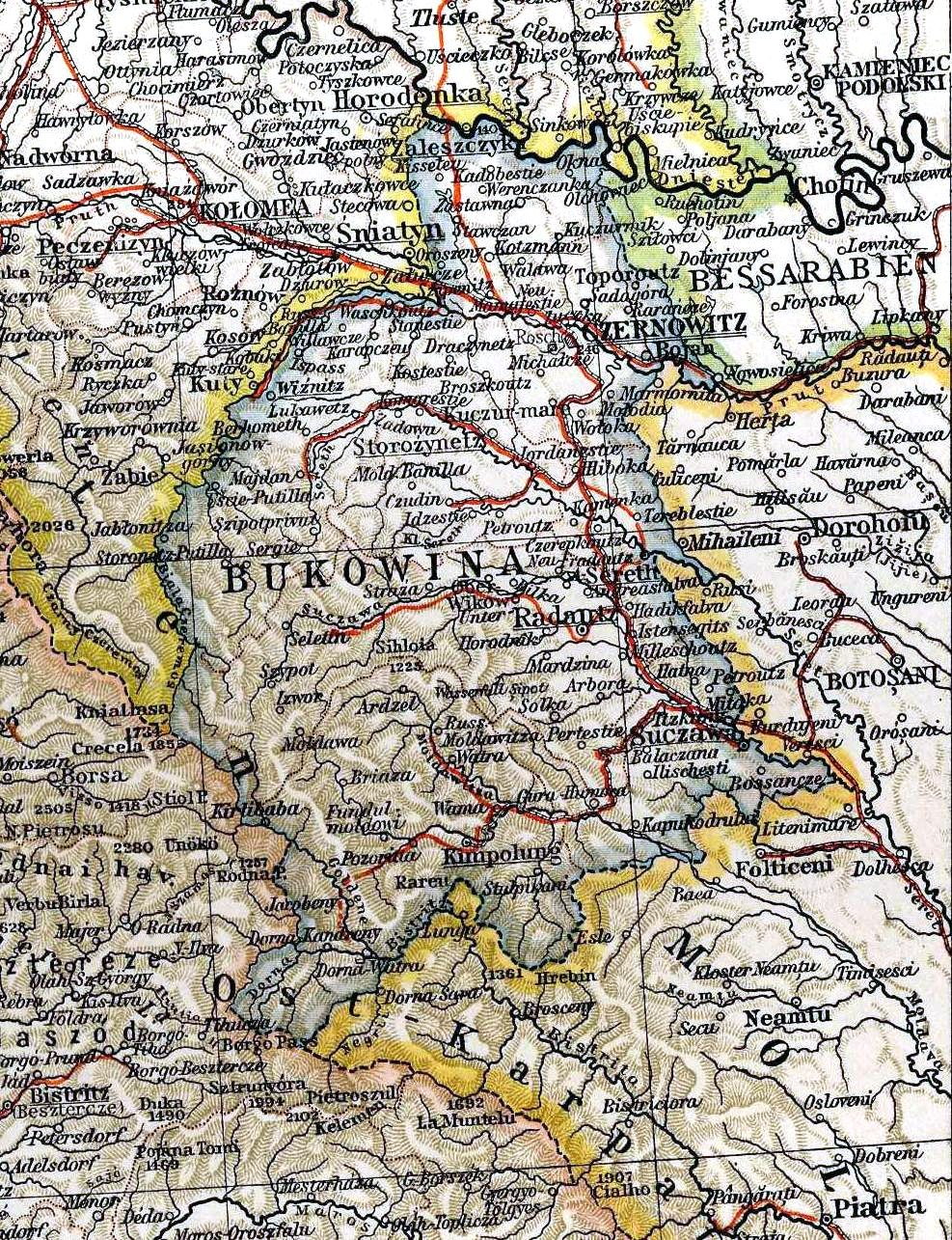
1901 map of Bukovina

When Kreis Bukowina was elevated to a duchy in its own right in 1849, it was initially still administered from the Galician capital Lemberg. By order of the Austrian Ministry of the Interior, Czernowitz became the seat of an Imperial-Royal (k.k.) Stadtholder in 1850. On 31 August 1860 it was re-subordinated to Lemberg but its separate status was restored in the 1861 February Patent, which also granted the Duchy of Bukovina a representative assembly, the Landtag diet with a Landesausschuss executive branch led by a Landeshauptmann. Upon the 1907 Cisleithanian legislative election the duchy was represented by 14 delegates in the Austrian Imperial Council legislature.

=== Subdivisions ===
In 1850 the first political districts (Bezirkshauptmannschaften) were introduced in Bukovina, based on the pre-existing judicial districts (Gerichtsbezirke):

Political district	Judicial districts
Czernowitz	Czernowitz (first and second sections), Sadagora, Streszents
Kotzmann	Kotzmann, Zastawna
Wischnitza	Wischnitz, Waskoutz, Putilla
Radautz	Sereth, Radautz, Seletin
Moldauisch Kimpolung	Kimpolung, Wadradorna, Gura humora
Suczawa	Suczawa, Solka

In 1854 the political districts were dissolved and Bukovina was divided into 15 Bezirke (districts), plus the Stadtbezirk (city-district) of Czernowitz. These Bezirke (sometimes referred to as Amtsbezirke) were administered centrally via four Bezirksämter (district offices):

- the Landesgericht in Czernowitz, covering the city and district of Czernowitz plus the districts of Sadagura, Kotzmann, Waskoutz am Czeremosz, and Zastawna
- the Bezirksamt in Suczawa, for the Suczawa, Dorna, Kimpolung and Gurahumora districts
- the Bezirksamt in Storoschinetz, for the Storoschinetz, Putilla and Wysznitz districts
- the Bezirksamt in Radautz, for the Radautz, Solka and Sereth districts

In 1868 political districts were reintroduced. There were initially eight political districts, whose territories were based on those of the former Amtsbezirke:

Political district	Former districts	Area (square German miles)	Population
Czernowitz	Czernowitz, Sadagora	15.75	66,975
Kotzmann	Kotzmann, Zastawna	15.61	75,556
Wisnitz	Wisnitz, Putilla	22.42	34,099
Storožynetz	Storožynetz, Stanestie	24.33	70,388
Radautz	Radautz, Solka	38.00	66,751
Suczawa	Suczawa, Gurahumora	23.13	58,912
Kimpolung	Kimpolung, Dorna	34.94	26,352
Sereth	Sereth	6.63	31,542

The boundaries and number of districts were amended several times during the rest of the duchy's existence; by 1914 the Duchy of Bukovina consisted of eleven political districts:

District	Area	Pop. (1900)
Czernowitz	876.05 km^{2} (338.24 mi^{2})	99,438
Gurahumora (est. 1893)	739.89 km^{2} (285.67 mi^{2})	55,741
Kimpolung	2,349.48 km^{2} (907.14 mi^{2})	55,688
Kotzmann	518.80 km^{2} (200.31 mi^{2})	94,633
Radautz	184.097 km^{2} (71.080 mi^{2})	82,152
Sereth	518.8 km^{2} (200.3 mi^{2})	60,743
Storoschinetz	1,152.31 km^{2} (444.91 mi^{2})	80,100
Suczawa	569.32 km^{2} (219.82 mi^{2})	62,447
Waskoutz am Czeremosz (est. 1903)	427.87 km^{2} (165.20 mi^{2})	43,595
Wysznitz	1,499.89 km^{2} (579.11 mi^{2})	71,631
Zastawna (est. 1905)	492.82 km^{2} (190.28 mi^{2})	51,502

=== Marshals of the Diet of Bukovina ===
Except Baron Anton Kochanowski of Stawczan, who was an ethnic Pole, all of the Marshals (Landeshauptmann) of the Diet were ethnic Romanians.

No.	Portrait	Name (Birth–Death)	Term	Monarch
1		Bishop; Eugenie Hacman (1793–1873)	26 February 1861 – 4 December 1862	Franz Joseph I (1848–1916)
2		Baron; Eudoxiu de Hurmuzachi (1812–1874)	5 December 1862 – 15 August 1870	Franz Joseph I (1848–1916)
3		Baron; Alexandru Wassilko de Serecki (1827–1893)	16 August 1870 – 15 December 1871	Franz Joseph I (1848–1916)
4		Baron; Eudoxiu de Hurmuzachi (1812–1874)	16 December 1871 – 10 February 1874	Franz Joseph I (1848–1916)
5		Baron; Anton Kochanowski von Stawczan (1817–1906)	27 April 1874 – 18 July 1884	Franz Joseph I (1848–1916)
6		Baron; Alexandru Wassilko de Serecki (1827–1893)	19 July 1884 – 31 August 1892	Franz Joseph I (1848–1916)
7		Ioan Lupul (1836–1922)	1 September 1892 – 13 September 1904	Franz Joseph I (1848–1916)
8		Count; Georg Wassilko von Serecki (1864–1940)	14 September 1904 – 26 May 1911	Franz Joseph I (1848–1916)
9		Baron; Alexandru de Hurmuzachi (1869–1946)	27 May 1911 – 21 November 1916	Franz Joseph I (1848–1916)
9		Baron; Alexandru de Hurmuzachi (1869–1946)	21 November 1916 – 12 November 1918	Charles I (1916–1918)

== Historical population ==
According to the 1775 Austrian census, the province had a total population of 86,000 (this included 56 villages which were later returned to Moldavia). The census only recorded social status and some ethno-religious groups. In 1919, the historian Ion Nistor claimed that Romanians constituted an overwhelming majority in 1774, roughly 64,000 (85%) of the 75,000 total population. Meanwhile, about 8,000 (10%) were Ruthenians, and 3,000 (4%) other ethnic groups. On the other hand, just four years before the same Nistor claimed the 1774 population consisted of 52,750 Romanians (73%), 15.000 Ruthenians (21%) and 4,000 others "using Romanian in conversation" (6%). In 2011, an anthropological analysis of the Russian census of the population of Moldavia in 1774 asserted a population of 68,700 people in 1774, out of which 40,920 (59.6%) were Romanians, 22,810 Ruthenians and Hutsuls (33.2%), and 7.2% Jews, Roma, and Armenians. The Ruthenians lived more densely in the north-west of Bukovina, especially in the zone between Prut and Dniester and the Hutsuls were concentrated in the mountain zone in the west of the province, especially in the zone of the rivers Ceremuș and Putyla. In 1787, the imperial officials documented in Czernowitz 414 houses, of which 153 were Moldavian (Romanian), 84 German and 76 Jewish, with the rest being Armenian, Arnaut (Albanian), Czech, Greek, Hungarian, Pole and Ruthene (Ukrainian).

During the 19th century, Austrian imperial policies encouraged immigration in order to develop the economy. The immigrants were mainly Ukrainians (at that time referred to as Ruthenians from Galicia) and Romanians from Transylvania and Hungary, as well as smaller numbers of Germans, Poles, Jews, and Hungarians. Official censuses in the Austrian Empire did not record ethno-linguistic data until 1850–1851. H.F. Müller gives the 1840 population used for purposes of military conscription as 339,669. According to Alecu Hurmuzaki, by 1848 55% of the population was Romanian. The Austrian census of 1850–1851, which for the first time recorded data regarding languages spoken, shows 48.50% Romanians and 38.07% Ruthenians

In 1843 the Ruthenian language was recognized, along with the Romanian language, as 'the language of the people and of the Church in Bukovina'.

According to estimates and Austrian/Austro-Hungarian census data, the population of Bukovina was:

Year	Romanians		Ruthenians (Ukrainians)		Others (including Bukovina Germans)	
1774.	40,920 – 64,000	59.6% – 85.33%	8,000 – 22,810	10.6% – 33.2%	3,000 – 4,970	4.0% – 7.2%
1848	209,293	55.4%	108,907	28.8%	59,381	15.8%
1851	184,718	48.5%	144,982	38.1%	51,126	13.4%
1880	190,005	33.4%	239,960	42.2%	138,758	24.4%
1890	208,301	32.4%	268,367	41.8%	165,827	25.8%
1900	229,018	31.4%	297,798	40.8%	203,379	27.8%
1910	273,254	34.1%	305,101	38.4%	216,574	27.2%
