= Alexander von Petrinò =

Romanian nobleman and politician (1824–1899)

Alexander Freiherr von Petrinò
- Alexandru Petrino

Minister of Agriculture of Austria
- In office 28 June 1870 – 6 February 1871
- Monarch: Franz Joseph I
- Prime Minister: Alfred Jozef Potocki
- Preceded by: Alfred Jozef Potocki
- Succeeded by: Albert Schäffle

Member of the House of Deputies
- In office 1861–1864
- In office 1867–1871
- In office 1873–1876

Member of the Diet of Bukovina
- In office 1861–1864
- In office 1866–1875

Personal details
- Born: 18 May 1824 Waschkautz, Austrian Empire
- Died: 17 April 1899 (aged 74) Czernowitz, Austria-Hungary
- Party: Federalist
- Occupation: Landowner, politician, businessman, banker
- Profession: Jurist
- Known for: the only Romanian and the only Bukovinan to become minister in the government of Austria

Alexander Freiherr von Petrinò (Romanian: Alexandru Petrino; 18 May 1824 – died 17 April 1899) was a Romanian nobleman, landowner and politician from the Austrian Bukovina. He served as a deputy in the Diet of Bukovina, the Imperial Council (Reichsrat), and as the Austrian Minister of Agriculture, being the only ethnic Romanian from Bukovina to hold this office. Petrinò advocated for the cultural and political autonomy of the Romanians in Bukovina.

== Biography ==
Coat of Arms of the Petrino family

Coming from an old family of Aromanian merchants who settled in Moldavia in the late 18th century as Phanariots, Petrinò was the son of landowner Apostolo Ioan (from 1835: Baron) Petrinò (d. 1837). His stepfather was landowner Ioan Mustață. He was of the Orthodox faith and married Marie Martine (d. 1895).

Several members of his extended family were also deputies in the Diet of Bukovina:

- His half-brother Nicolae Petrinò (1817–1884), from his father's first marriage;
- His half-brother Otto Petrinò (1834–1884);
- His stepbrother from his mother’s second marriage, Nicolae Mustață (1839–1904);
- His stepbrother Ioan Mustață (1830–1895).

He attended gymnasium and the Institute of Philosophy in Czernowitz, then studied law at the University of Vienna starting in 1842. After finishing his studies, he lived as a landowner in Vășcăuți. In 1855, he purchased the Budineț estate. After 1875, he engaged in industrial investments, becoming a major shareholder in the Lemberg–Czernowitz–Jassy railway company and, from 1882, co-founder and president (until 1889) of the Bukowinaer Boden-Credit-Anstalt.

== Political career ==
During the Moldavian Revolution of 1848, Petrino, who was in Iași at that time, took part in the revolutionary movement.

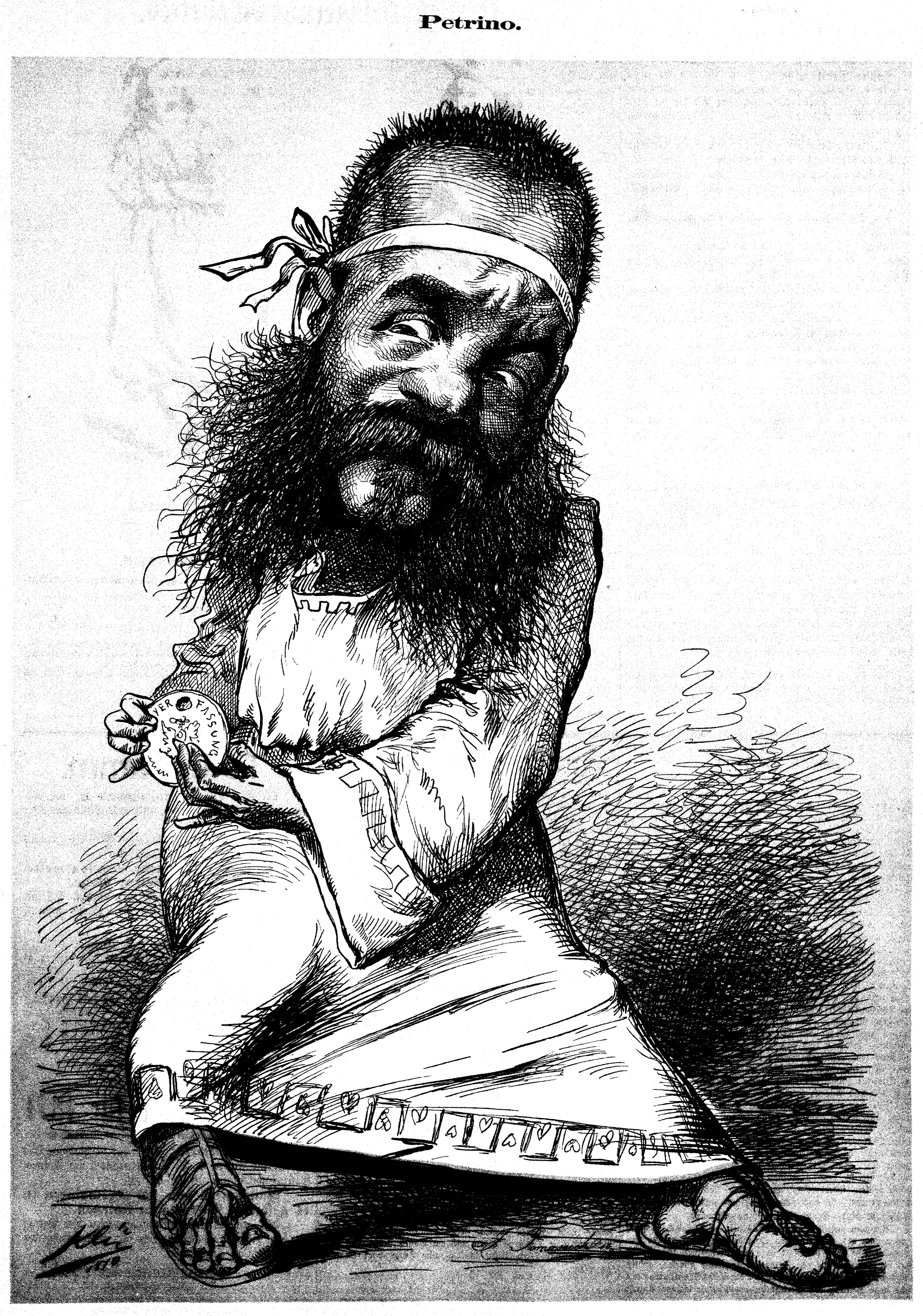
Caricature of Petrinò (1870)

In 1860, he became a member of the expanded Imperial Council, where he supported the improvement of the Orthodox Church's status. Following the establishment of the Bukovina Diet in 1861, he served as a deputy in the periods: 1861–1864, 1866–1873, and 1874–1875. He was also a member of the Imperial Council in multiple terms: 1861–1864, 1867–1870, 1870–1871, and 1873–1876.

As one of the wealthiest landowners in Bukovina, Petrinò was a founding member of the Association for the Culture of the Land, the Bukovina Local Railways Company, and the Land Credit Institute. He supported the founding of the Country Library in Czernowitz and the Society for Romanian Culture and Literature in Bukovina.

After his brother Nicolae declined a mandate, Alexander Petrinò was elected in a partial election to the first legislature (3 May 1861 – 9 May 1864) from the college of large landowners. In the second legislature (20 May 1867 – 31 March 1870), he was elected by the cities' college and the Czernowitz Chamber of Commerce. He resigned again, along with 11 other deputies, in protest against the Reichsrat's rejection of his proposal for expanded provincial autonomy and dissatisfaction with emergency electoral law debates. In the third and fifth legislatures, he was again elected by the landowners' college. Between 17 June and late September 1867, he was part of the Herbst-Kaiserfeld Club. In 1870 and again in 1873, he joined the conservative-centrist club, identifying as a Romanian federalist.

In the government led by Count Alfred Józef Potocki, Petrinò briefly served as acting Minister of Agriculture (6 May – 28 June 1870), then as full minister from 28 June 1870 to 6 February 1871.

Baron Petrinò led the Federalist Party (also known as the Autonomist Party), which campaigned for greater autonomy of Bukovina from Vienna. Other members included Gheorghe Hurmuzachi, Alexander Wassilko von Serecki, and Gheorghe Flondor. The federalists, while nationalist, viewed all of Bukovina as historically Romanian. Governor Martina remarked that "Petrinò's party" incited agitation against foreign officials (e.g., Ruthenians) brought in from Galicia. The party was considered conservative and nationalist and therefore acting as a ‘Romanian party’, because its members were concerned with promoting the Romanian language, the Orthodox Church, Romanian schools, the placement of as many Romanian officials as possible in local public administrations. It also spoke out against the centralising tendencies of Vienna, supporting the extension of the right to vote on other social categories, ensuring public education, freedom of the press, and the material and spiritual progress of all nationalities in the empire.

Petrinò became the rival of liberal Eudoxiu Hurmuzachi, leader of the Centralists, who also supported Bukovina’s autonomous and Romanian character but favored harmonization with Vienna’s legislation and closer cooperation with Bukovina’s German-speaking population.

Petrinò co-founded the Regional Cultural Association of Bukovina and is considered one of the founders of the Romanian cooperative system in the province.

In 1872, he founded the Society of National Autonomists and the newspaper Der Patriot, in an attempt to regain political support. However, the endeavor ended in electoral failure, and combined with family problems, led to his withdrawal from politics in 1875. He retired to his estate, where he remained until his death in 1899.

== Literary activity ==
In 1875, after retiring from politics, Alexandru Petrino wrote the poem Resemnare (Resignation), marked by a melancholic tone, a modern lyrical discourse, and a remarkable philosophical load.
