= Berehomet =

Rural locality in Chernivtsi Oblast, Ukraine

Berehomet Берегомет
- Rural settlement
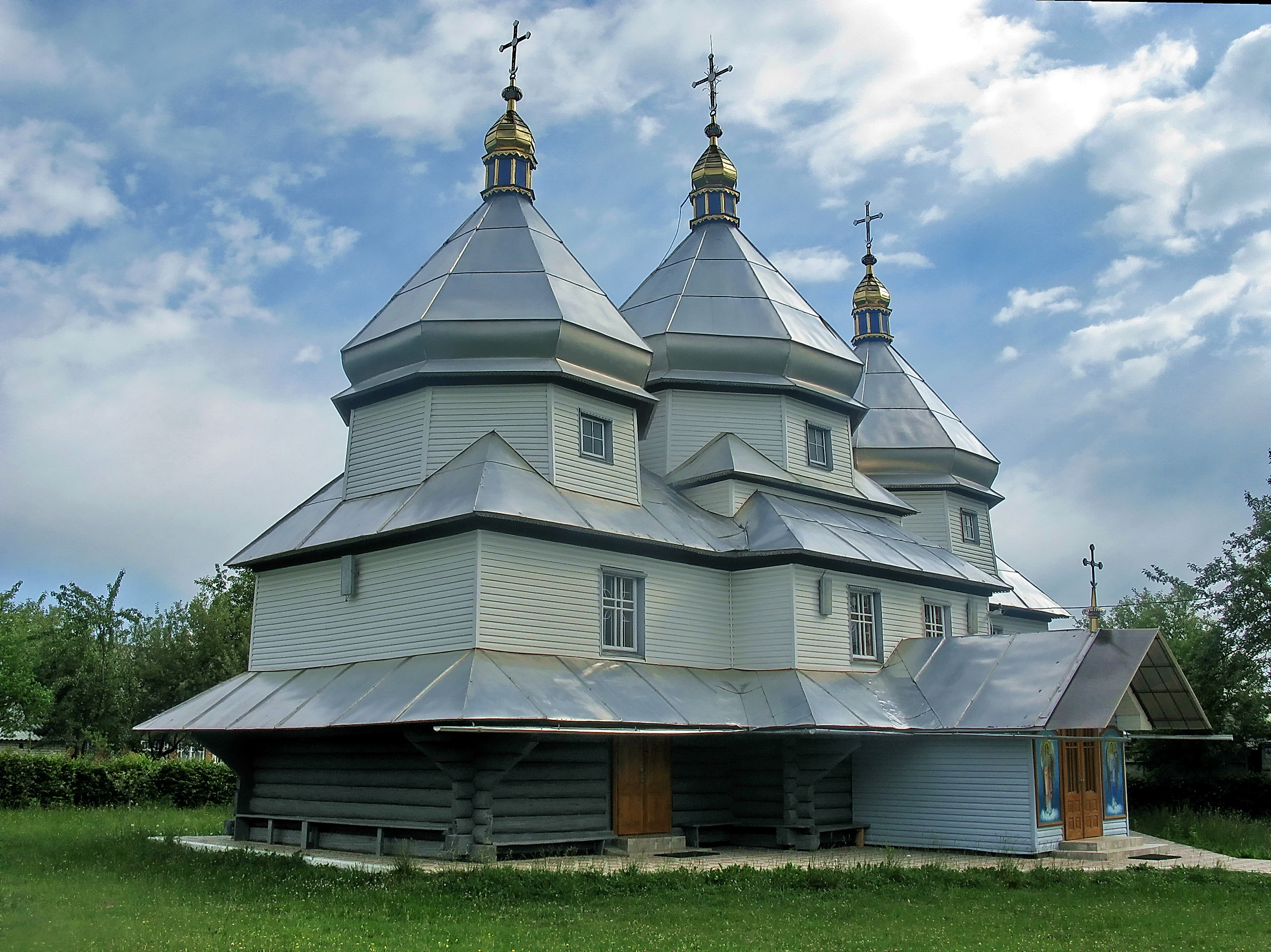
- Saint George's Church

- Location of Berehomet in Ukraine Berehomet (Ukraine)
- Coordinates: 48°09′25″N 25°18′20″E
- Country: Ukraine
- Oblast: Chernivtsi Oblast
- Raion: Vyzhnytsia Raion
- Hromada: Berehomet settlement hromada
- Town status: 1963

Government
  - Town Head: Serhiy Bodnaryuk

Area
  - Total: 19.6 km^{2} (7.6 sq mi)
- Elevation: 467 m (1,532 ft)

Population (2024)
  - Total: 7,588
  - Density: 387/km^{2} (1,000/sq mi)
- Time zone: UTC+2 (EET)
  - Summer (DST): UTC+3 (EEST)
- Postal code: 59233
- Area code: +380 3730
- Website: http://rada.gov.ua/

Berehomet (Ukrainian: Берегомет; Romanian: Berhomet pe Siret; German: Berhometh; Yiddish: בערעמעט, romanized: Berhomet) is a rural settlement in Vyzhnytsia Raion, Chernivtsi Oblast, western Ukraine. It hosts the administration of Berehomet settlement hromada, one of the hromadas of Ukraine. The settlement lies on the Siret River. As of the 2001 census, the settlement's population was 8,513. Population: 7,514 (2022 estimate), 7,588 (2024 estimate).

One village is administered by the settlement, Zarichchia (Заріччя).

The name of the rural settlement comes from the word berehomet Ukrainian: берегомет - a place where the river bank is washed away by water.

== History ==
The first mention of the village was in 1696.

Starting in 1963, Berehomet was designated an urban-type settlement. This status lasted until 26 January 2024, when a new law entered into force which abolished this status, and Berehomet became a rural settlement.

== Notable people ==
- Baron Alexander Wassilko von Serecki (1823–1893), governor of the Duchy of Bucovina and member of the Herrenhaus
- Count Georg Wassilko von Serecki (1864–1940), governor of the Duchy of Bucovina and hereditary member of the Herrenhaus
- Antin Kravs (1871–1945), Ukrainian Galician Army general.
- Odarka Kyselytsia, Ukrainian landscape and portrait painter, Honored Artist of Ukraine (1997).
