= Georg Wassilko von Serecki =

Austro-Hungarian Romanian politician (1864–1940)

Hochgeboren Graf Georg Wassilko von Serecki
- Wassilko von Serecki in 1895

Landeshauptmann of Bukovina
- In office 1904–1911
- Preceded by: Ioan Lupul
- Succeeded by: Alexandru N. Hurmuzachi

Personal details
- Born: 17 February 1864 Berhometh, Austrian Empire (now Berehomet, Ukraine)
- Died: 24 March 1940 (aged 76) Berehomet, Kingdom of Romania
- Parents: Alexander Wassilko von Serecki; Katharina von Flondor (mother)
- Education: Chernivtsi University; University of Vienna

Georg Wassilko von Serecki (17 February 1864 – 24 March 1940), was an Austrian Empire-born ethnic Romanian statesman, Landeshauptmann of the Duchy of Bucovina and hereditary member of the Herrenhaus, the Upper House of the Imperial Council of Austria.

== Early life and ancestry ==
Born into an old Modavian boyar Wassilko von Serecki family, he was born as eldest son of Freiherr Alexander Wassilko von Serecki and his wife, Katharina von Flondor (1843-1920).

== Activity ==
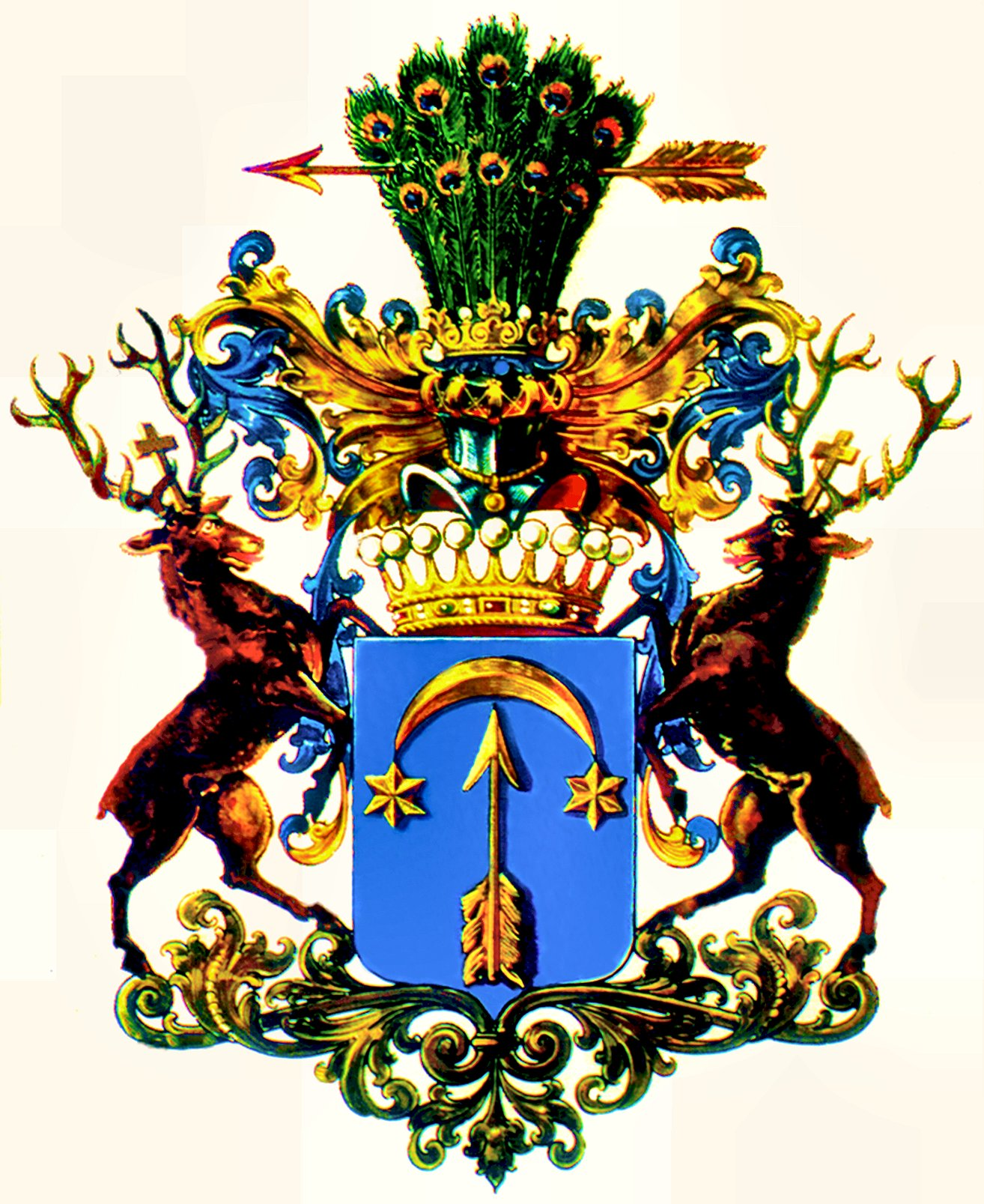
Coat of arms - Counts Wassilko von Serecki

George attended the German Gymnasium at Czernowitz (Cernăuți), then the Theresianum in Vienna and graduated with his baccalaureate in 1882. Then he studied jurisprudence and economics at the University of Czernowitz and the University of Vienna. He rejected chauvinism and snobbery and thus joined the international student fraternity "Danubia". He also stood very close to the liberal Romanian association "România Jună". The Romanian balls, that he frequently organized as their committee president, were legendary. For this he was once rewarded in a remarkable manner by Crown Prince Rudolf, who often participated in one of these events.

In 1885 the new Romanian political society of young intellectuals led by George Popovici together with Constantin Isopescul, Constantin Morariu (grandnephew of Metropolitan Sylvester-Andrievici Morariu), Iancu Flondor and others, began to fight the conservative wing of large landowners. The young student enthusiastically joined this group. After the 1892 affair surrounding the President of Bukovina, Count Anton Pace von Friedensberg, finally the "youngsters" agreed with the conservatives and founded the political club "Concordia". In 1898 George was co-founder of the newspaper "Gazeta Bucovina" and became political spokesman of the party.

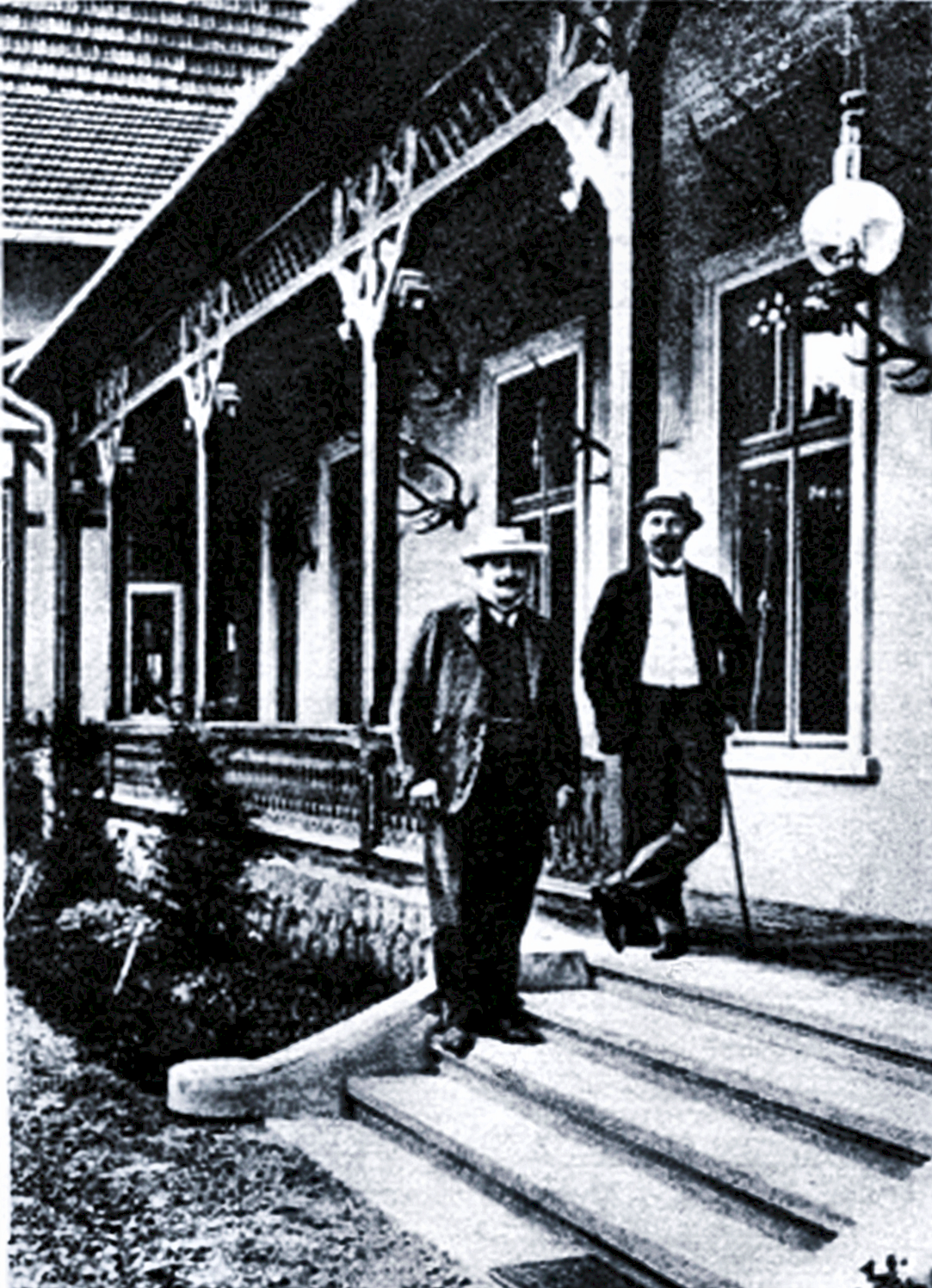
President Prince Hohenlohe (r.) and Governor of Bukovina, Count Georg Wassilko, at Berhometh Castle in 1904

The Baron became a member of the Bukovina Diet and on 8 March 1895 he was elected to the Imperial Council (Reichsrat), as successor of Baron Victor Styrcea (until 1904). During this time he joined the "Hohenwart Club". Then he founded in Vienna, together with George Popovici, Baron Alexander Hurmuzachi and other Romanian parliamentarians the "Clubul Parlamentar Român" within the Imperial Council, and was elected as vice-president.

The Government needed their votes to reach the majority necessary for the adoption of various legislative proposals. The group, therefore, received some benefits for the Romanian community, such as the creation of parallel Romanian classes at the German Gymnasium in Czernowitz. Wassilko also strongly argued against the persecution of Romanians in Transylvania.

On 10 June 1904 Wassilko was appointed permanently, and later, in 1907, hereditary member of the Upper House of the Austrian Empire. On 14 September 1904 Emperor Franz Joseph of Austria designated him as Governor of the Duchy Bukovina, a function he held until July 1911. His decorations included, inter alia, the Imperial Order of Leopold, the Grand Cross of the Order of Franz Josef, personally handed over by Emperor Franz Josef, and the Grand Cross of the Order Star of Romania by King Carol I of Romania.

In 1919 and 1922, after the union of Bukovina with Romania, Wassilko was elected with large majority as member of the Romanian Parliament, in which he served as Vice President of the Senate. George was also a strong supporter and later honorary president of the most influential intellectual, cultural and political Romanian union of the 19th and early 20th century, the society "Junimea", which his father had cofounded.

After George Wassilko and his brothers Stephan (1869-1933), Alexander (1871-1920) and Victor (1872-1934) had already been honored on 19 December 1905 with the title of Imperial Chamberlain, they were raised to the rank of Count by resolution of Emperor Karl I of Austria for their loyalty to the state and their personal sacrifices (Imperial Resolution of 29 August 1918 in Eckartsau, diploma in Vienna, 19 October).

The Wassilko von Serecki family was the only family of Romanian origin whose members bore the title of Count in Austro-Hungarian Empire.

== Family ==
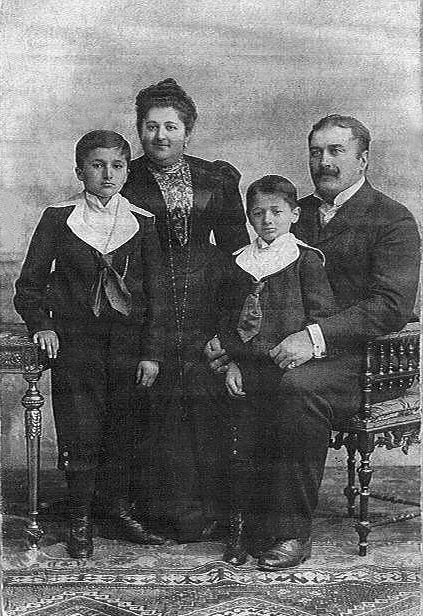
Constantin, Elisa, Xandi, Georg Wassilko von Serecki 1901

George was the grandson of Baron Iordache and oldest son of Baron Alexander Wassilko von Serecki, Governor of the Duchy of Bukovina, life member of the Upper House in Vienna and Katharina von Flondor (1827–1893).

On 5 October 1890 he married at Mendyk Castle Elise von Ohanowicz (b. 20 April 1874, Mendyk Castle – d. 15 October 1943, Cernăuți). They had two sons: Constantin (Costea) (b. 9 August 1891, Berhomet Castle – d. 25 December 1932, Cernăuți) whose wife was Princess Tatiana of Sayn-Wittgenstein (1894-1974) and Alexander (Xandi) (b. 17 November 1893, Castle Berhometh, - d. 27 May 1972, Dumbrăveni) married in first marriage with Anisia von Costin (1897-1965), then with Baroness Margit von Vécsey (1903-1971), daughter of the general of division Baron Eduard von Vécsey.

Alexander, being – in the eyes of the communist regime – the head of a "family of unhealthy origin", was sentenced in 1949 to five years of forced labor at the Danube Canal near Sulina and then to compulsory domicile at Dumbrăveni until his death.

== Sources ==
- Die Gothaischen Genealogischen Taschenbücher des Adels S-Z, S. 606, GB 1919
- Gothaisches Genealogischen Taschenbuch der Gräflichen Häuser Teil B, S. 536-537, 114. Jahrgang, 1941
- Die Flondoraffaire im Bukowinaer Landtage. Nach den stenographischen Protokollen. Czernowitz 1903. Verlag der „Bukowinaer Post“, Druck Isidor Wiehler, Czernowitz, 256 p.
- Ion Nistor, Istoria Bucovinei, Editura Humanitas, București 1991
- Erich Prokopowitsch, Der Adel in der Bukowina, Verlag "Der Südostdeutsche", München 1983
- Ion Drăgușanul, Bucovina faptului divers, Vol. 1,2, Editura Bucovina Viitoare, Suceava, 2002
- Mihai-Ștefan Ceaușu, Czernowitz 1892 in: Wladimir Fischer (Hg.), Räume und Grenzen in Österreich-Ungarn 1867-1918: kulturwissenschaftliche Annäherungen, Francke Verlag 2010
