= Alexander Wassilko von Serecki =

Austro-Hungarian Romanian statesman (1827–1893)

Freiherr Alexander Wassilko von Serecki

Landeshauptmann of Bukovina
- In office 1870–1871
- Preceded by: Eudoxiu Hurmuzachi
- Succeeded by: Eudoxiu Hurmuzachi
- In office 1884–1892
- Preceded by: Anton Kochanowski von Stawczan
- Succeeded by: Ioan Lupul

Personal details
- Born: 17 December 1827 Berhometh, Austrian Empire (now Berehomet, Ukraine)
- Died: 20 August 1893 (aged 65) Lopuszna, Austria-Hungary (now Lopushna, Ukraine)
- Party: Autonomist Romanian Conservative Party
- Spouse: Katharina von Flondor (m. 1859–1893)
- Relations: Georg Wassilko von Serecki (son)
- Education: Chernivtsi University; University of Lviv

Freiherr Alexander Wassilko von Serecki (17 December 1827 – 20 August 1893) was an Austro-Hungarian ethnic Romanian statesman, Landeshauptmann of the Duchy of Bukovina and member of the Herrenhaus, the Upper House of the Imperial Council of Austria.

== Activity ==
After completing his baccalaureate in 1846, Wassilko von Serecki studied philosophy and jurisprudence at the universities of Czernowitz and Lemberg. Since 1850 he worked as a lawyer in Czernowitz and after 1859 he managed his father's Baron Jordaki estates.

Wassilko von Serecki became a member of the "Autonomist Romanian Conservative Party", led by Alexander von Petrino, and began his political career in 1862, when he was elected as one of their representatives in the Council (Diet) of Bukovina.

In 1863, Wassilko von Serecki cofounded the society "Junimea", the most influential intellectual, cultural and political Romanian union of the 19th century. He continued to support it and later became an honorary member.

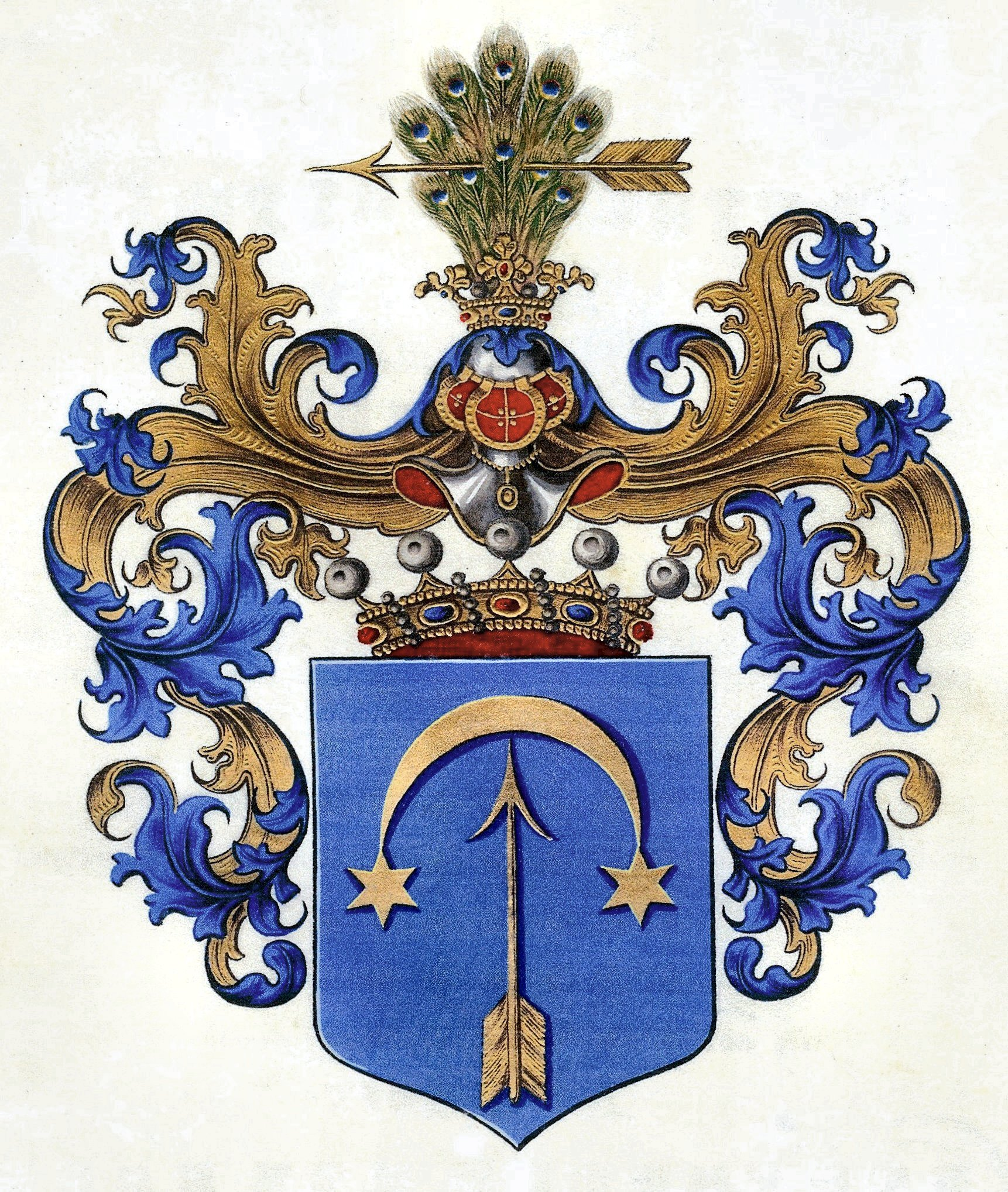
Coat of arms of the barons Wassilko von Serecki

On 24 February 1867 Emperor Franz Josef designated him to succeed his father as member in the Herrenhaus, the Upper House of the Imperial Parliament in Vienna in 1867. He was the only representative of the Duchy of Bukovina in this chamber for thirteen years. Finally, in 1880, the metropolitan of Bukovina and Dalmatia Sylvester Morariu-Andriewicz, also became a member of this institution.

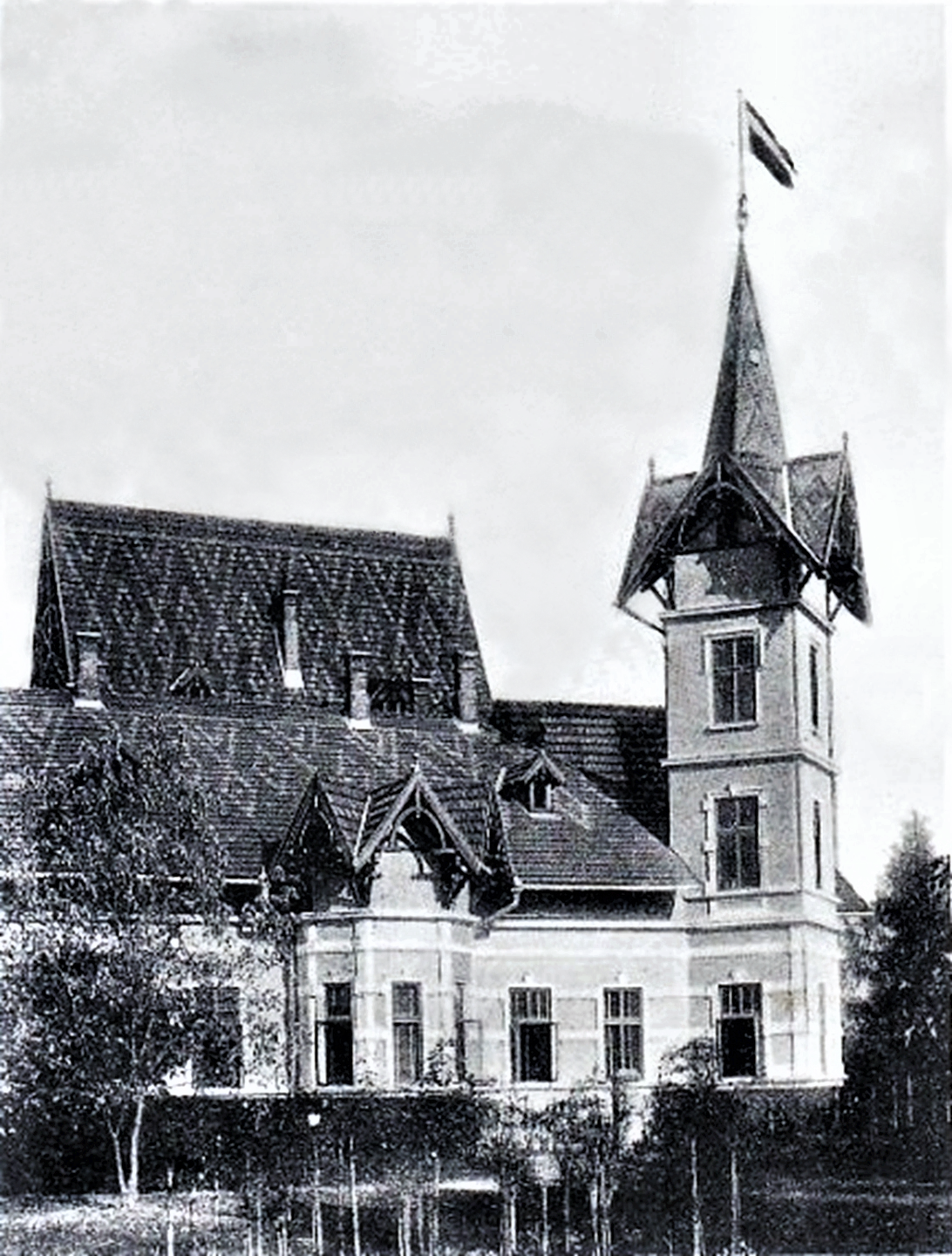
Berhometh Castle at 1900

From 1870 to 1871 and again from 1884 to 1892, he assumed the position of Governor of the Duchy of Bukovina. He attracted considerable attention, because he campaigned, along with other members of his parliament (including Hormuzaki, Costin, Flondor) successfully campaigned in Vienna for the limitation of the monopoly and autocracy of the Eastern Orthodox Church.

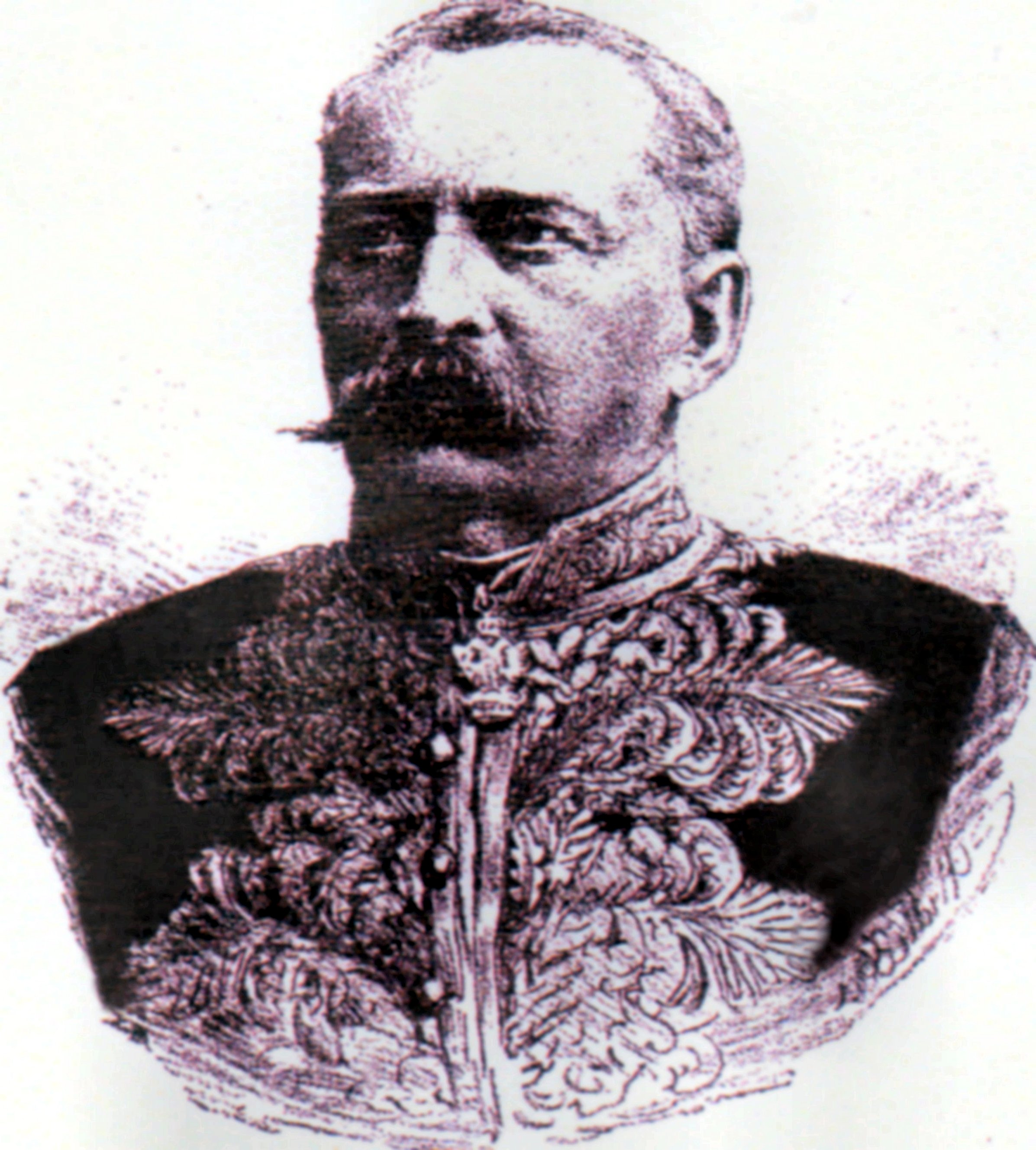
Wassilko von Serecki in 1890

Due to his relationship with the Viennese court he also achieved, that in 1876 the Romanian language was approved as language of instruction at the Lyceum of Suczawa. The permission to teach in Romanian in special high school classes in Czernowitz followed several years later.

He also insisted, despite his leading position in the federal faction of the Romanian aristocracy and as Governor of Bukovina, that all citizens had the right to freely exercise their own religion and culture, and to have their mother tongue recognized, but always under the auspices of the Habsburg monarchy and the leadership of the Emperor. After the Kingdom of Romania was founded in 1881, Alexander proved to be a resolute opponent of the growing number of proponents for a union of the Bucovina with Romania. In his opening speech as governor, given in German language in the Bukovina Parliament on 22 July 1884, he called on all parliamentarians to proceed unanimously in upholding provincial autonomy within the concept of an Austrian state. He also campaigned for the legal recognition of the German, Romanian and Ruthenian languages, stressing that the German language was the common bond of all the peoples in the monarchy. These have evolved historically and factually as the only official language, and is therefore to be ruled by them. He was considered an early pioneer of the idea of a United Europe of Nations. He was also a member of the Austrian Academy of Sciences.

In 1885 His Imperial and Royal Apostolic Majesty awarded the baron the Order of the Iron Crown 2nd class and, in 1888, on the occasion of his reappointment as governor, the rank of a "Real Privy Councillor".

His unexpected death in 1893 led to "deep dismay and sadness" in the population, and among his political friends and enemies.

== Family ==
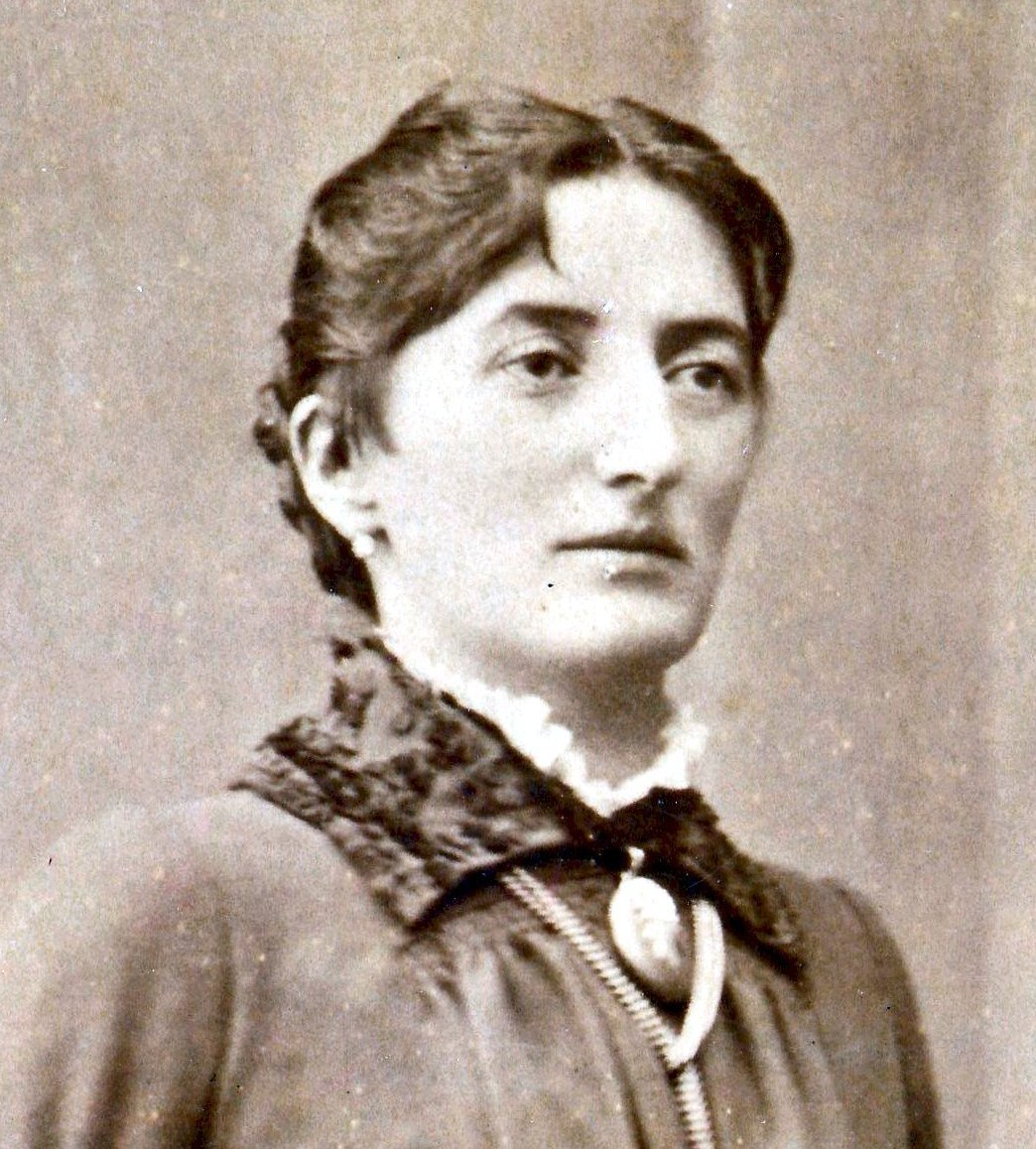
Katharina von Flondor

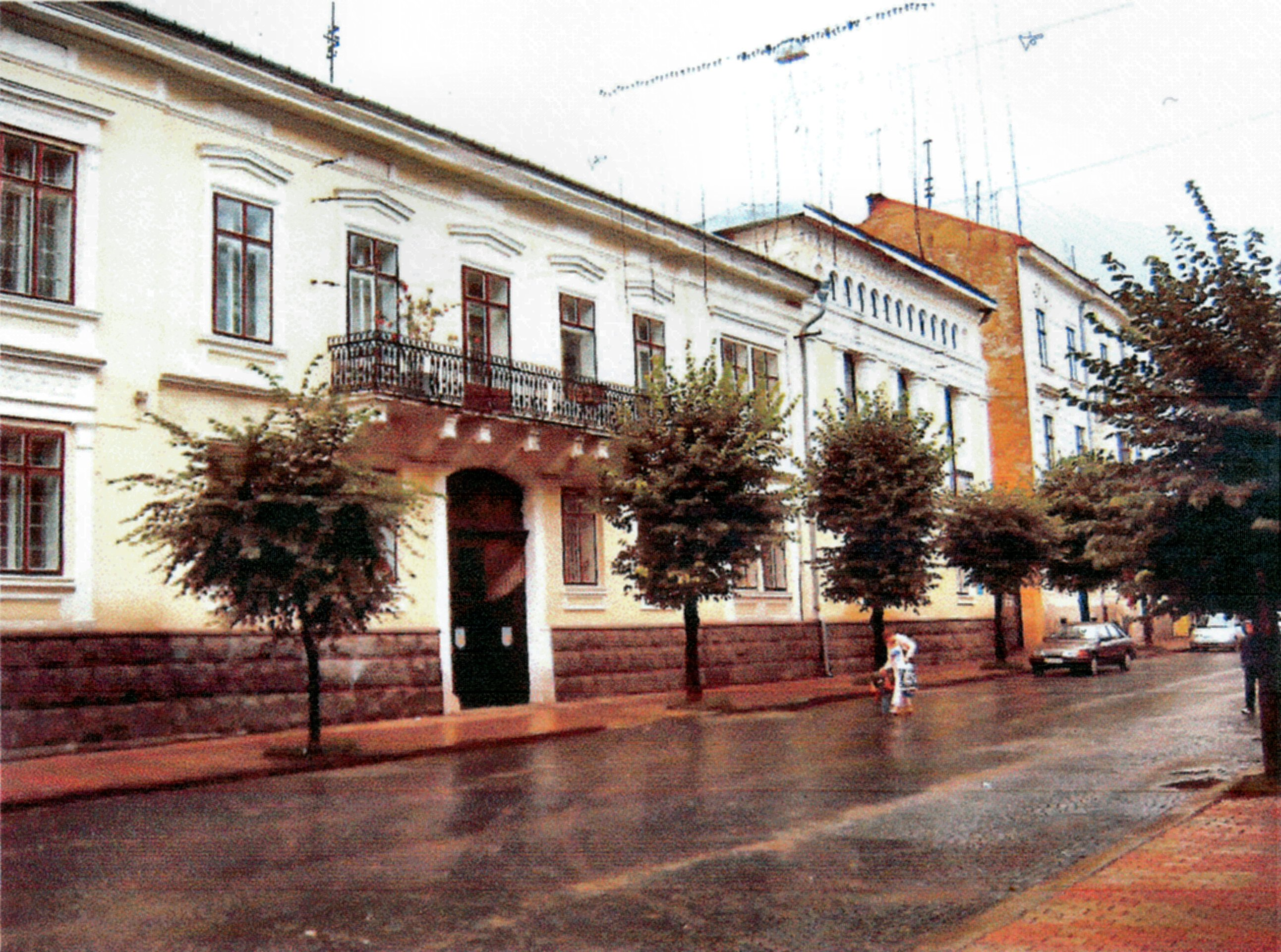
Wassilko-Palais, Czernowitz

Alexander was the son of Baron Iordaki (b. 4 March 1795, Castle Berhometh; d. 6 November 1861, ibid.) and his wife, Pulcheria Kalmuţchi (b. 3 November 1811, in Rohozna, Bukovina; d. 22 August 1895, in Czernowitz). On 16 June 1859, at Castle Hlinița, he married Katharina (b. 21 July 1843, at Hlinița Castle, d. 27 December 1920, at Mihowa Castle), the daughter of a landowner and owner of Hlinița-Castle, Jordaki Ritter von Flondor (1798-1868). The marriage resulted in four sons:

- Georg (1864-1940) also Austro-Hungarian statesman (Governor) of the Duchy of Bucovina,
- Stephan (b. 10 June 1869, Berhometh; d. 31 August 1933, Salzburg), Officer and Ministerial Counsellor in the Ministry of the Interior,
- Alexander (b. 2 February 1871, Berhometh Castle; d. 21 July 1920, Bârlad), Chamberlain of the Archduke Henry Ferdinand of Habsburg-Toscana, Lieutenant-Colonel and Deputy Head of the Evidenzbureau. His wife mother Eva baroness von Rolsberg was the granddaughter of Feldzeugmeister Wilhelm Lenk von Wolfsberg.
- Viktor (b. 19 May 1872, auf Berhometh Castle; d. 13 July 1934, Czernowitz), orthodox military priest, than archdeacon and Exarch in Vienna.

Emperor Charles I of Austria appointed them with the title of "Kämmerer" of the empire in 1905, and on 29 August 1918 (Diploma of October 19 of the year) to Austrian Counts Wassilko von Serecki. In 1907 the family was named hereditary member of the Upper House of the Austrian Imperial Council.

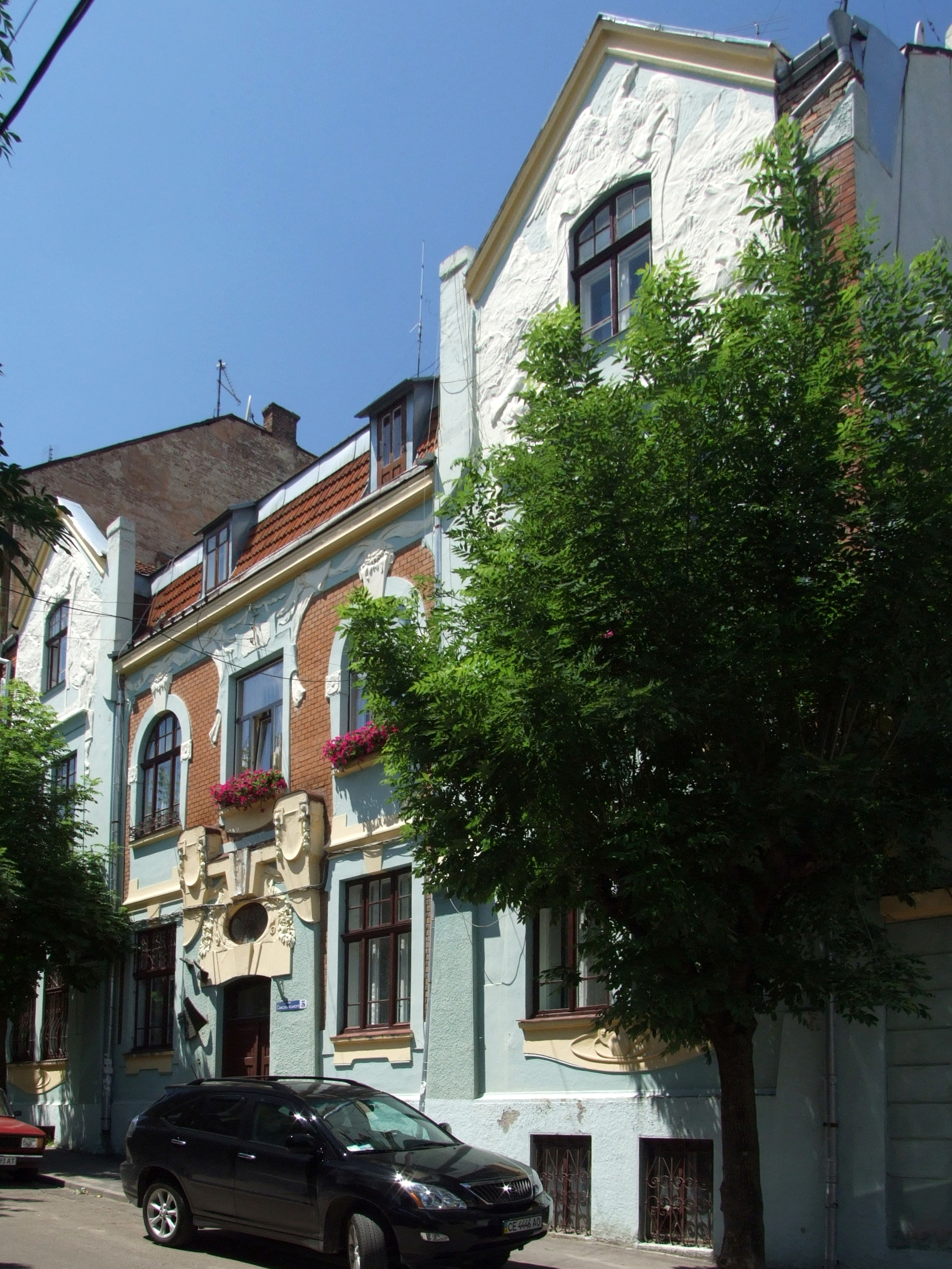
5 Wassilkogasse in Czernowitz

== Possessions ==
He was by far the largest landowner in Bukovina (28,000 hectares) and one of the largest in the Austria-Hungarian Empire. Because his brothers died childless, Emperor Franz Joseph I, with the consent of both Houses of the Imperial Parliament, approved him in 1888 to establish and guide a "Realfideikommisss".

In order to advance the state of agriculture on his property he founded two villages named after himself and his wife: "Alexanderdorf" (1863) and "Katharinendorf" (1869). There he settled German-Lutheran farmers from the area and from Galicia. In both places he built German schools (1870 and 1875). Settler families had to pay small, regular fees for their maintenance. Because the closest Lutheran Church was 70 km away, in Czernowitz, he established a Lutheran church for the two villages.

The Baron acquired the 1886 "Wassilko-Palais", a building at Herrengasse No. 38, in Czernowitz. He also completed the construction of "Berhometh Castle", that had been destroyed by fire in the Russian offensive of 1915, during the First World War. In 1889 the Baron also ordered the building of a new church in Berhometh. In 1924 the "Wassilkogasse" in Czernowitz, a side street of the "Herrengasse" named after the family, was renamed, to honour him. The German-Jewish author Paul Celan grew up on this street, in house No. 5.
