= List of Landeshauptmann of Bukovina =

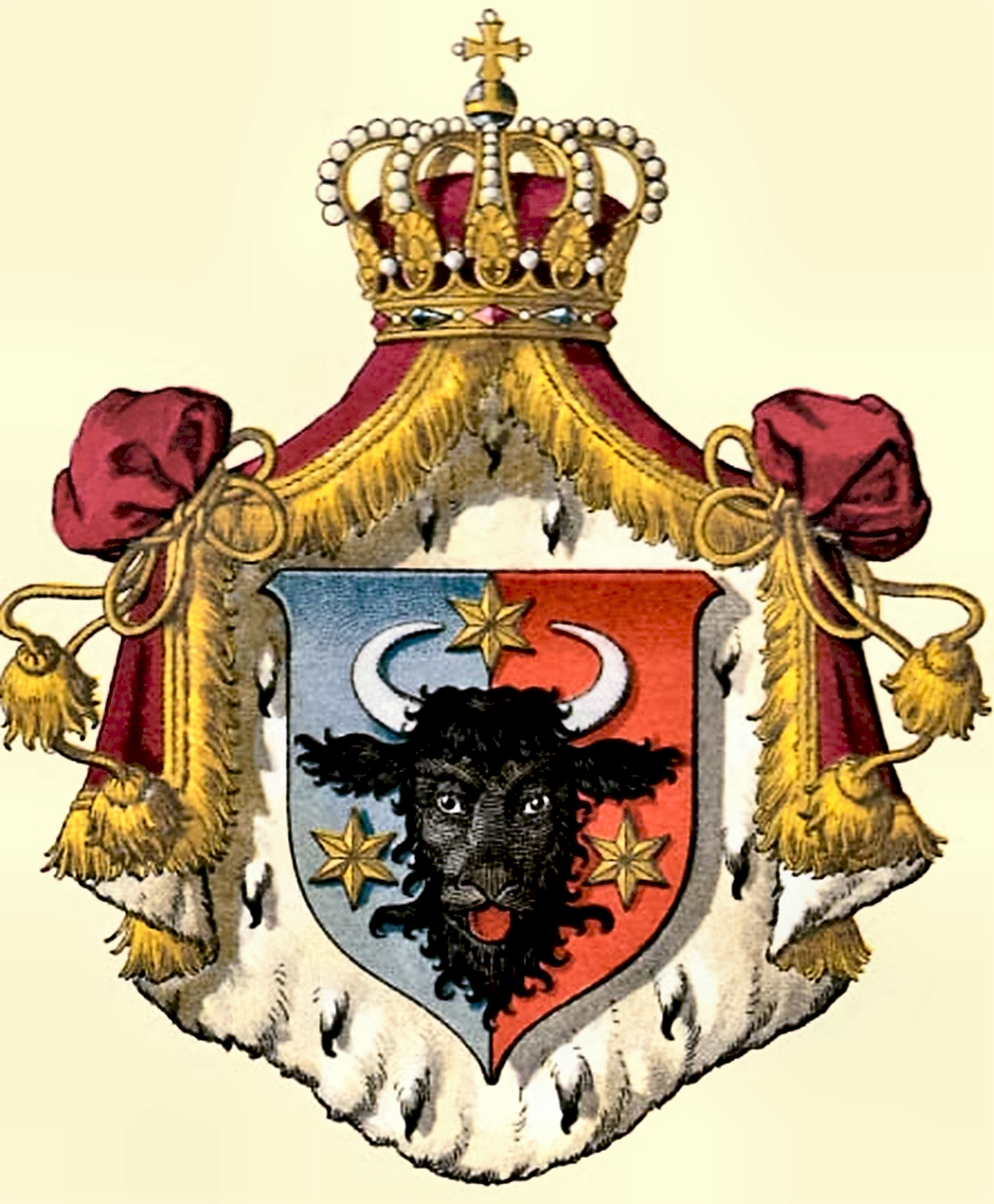
Coat of arms of the Duchy of Bukovina

This list outlines the Landeshauptmen of the Crownland Duchy of Bukovina at the time of the reign of the Habsburg Empire.

Except Baron Anton Kochanowski von Stawczan, who was of Polish origin, all the Landeshauptmen of Bukovina were ethnic Romanians.

== Landeshauptmann of Bucovina ==
- Eugenie Hacman (1861–1862)
- Eudoxiu Hurmuzachi (1862–1870)
- Alexander Wassilko von Serecki (1870–1871)
- Eudoxiu Hurmuzachi (1871–1874)
- Anton Kochanowski von Stawczan (1874–1884)
- Alexander Wassilko von Serecki (1884–1892)
- Ioan Lupul (1892–1904)
- Georg Wassilko von Serecki (1904–1911)
- Alexandru N. Hurmuzachi (1911–1918)

=== Gallery ===
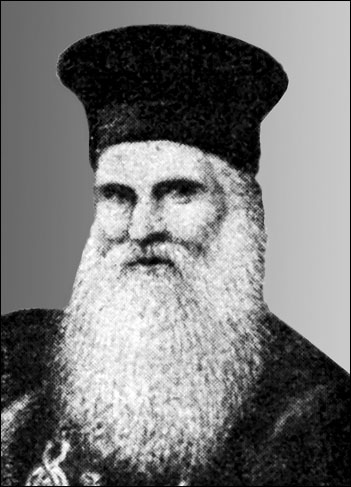
Eugenie Hacman

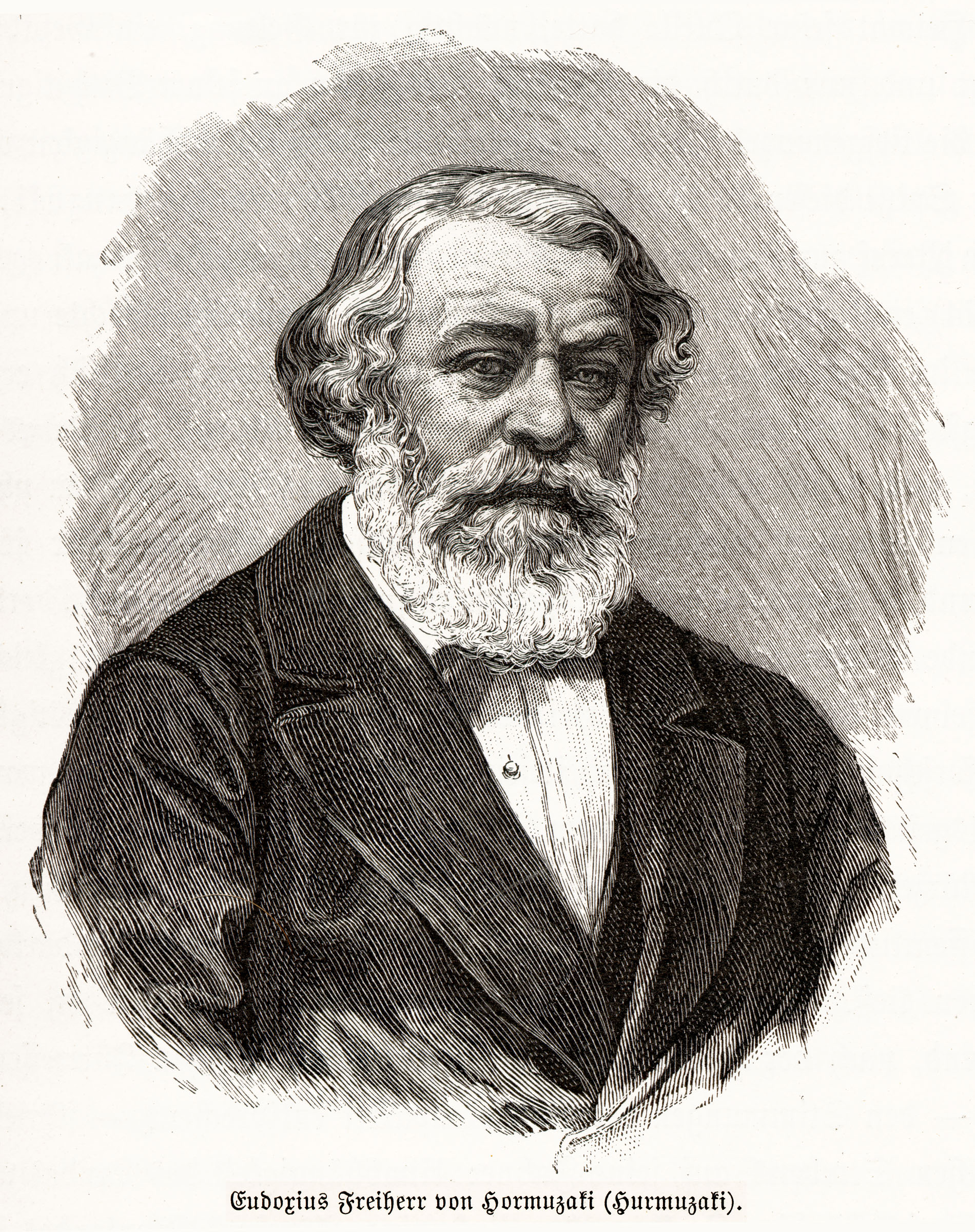
Eudoxiu Hurmuzachi

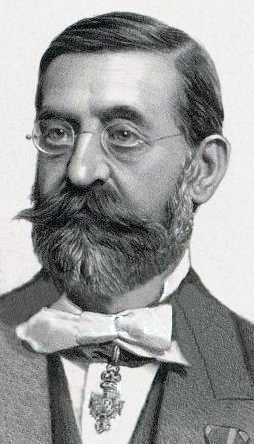
Anton Kochanowski von Stawczan

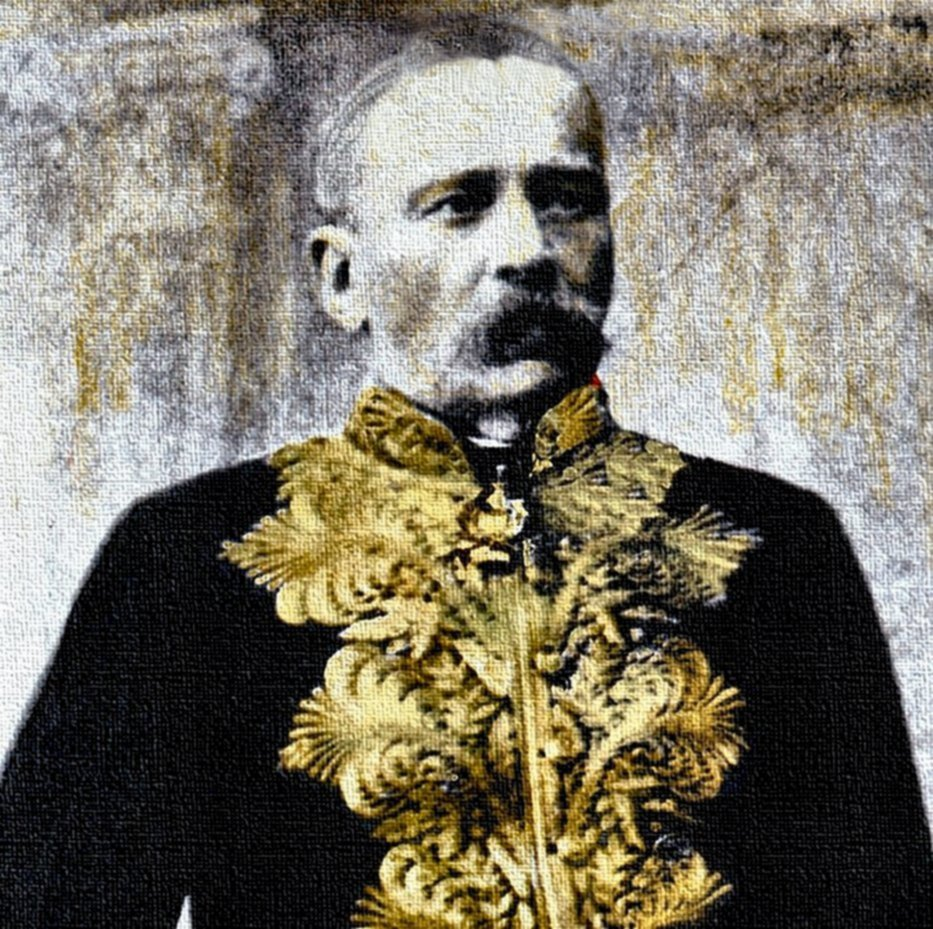
Alexander Wassilko von Serecki

Johann von Lupul

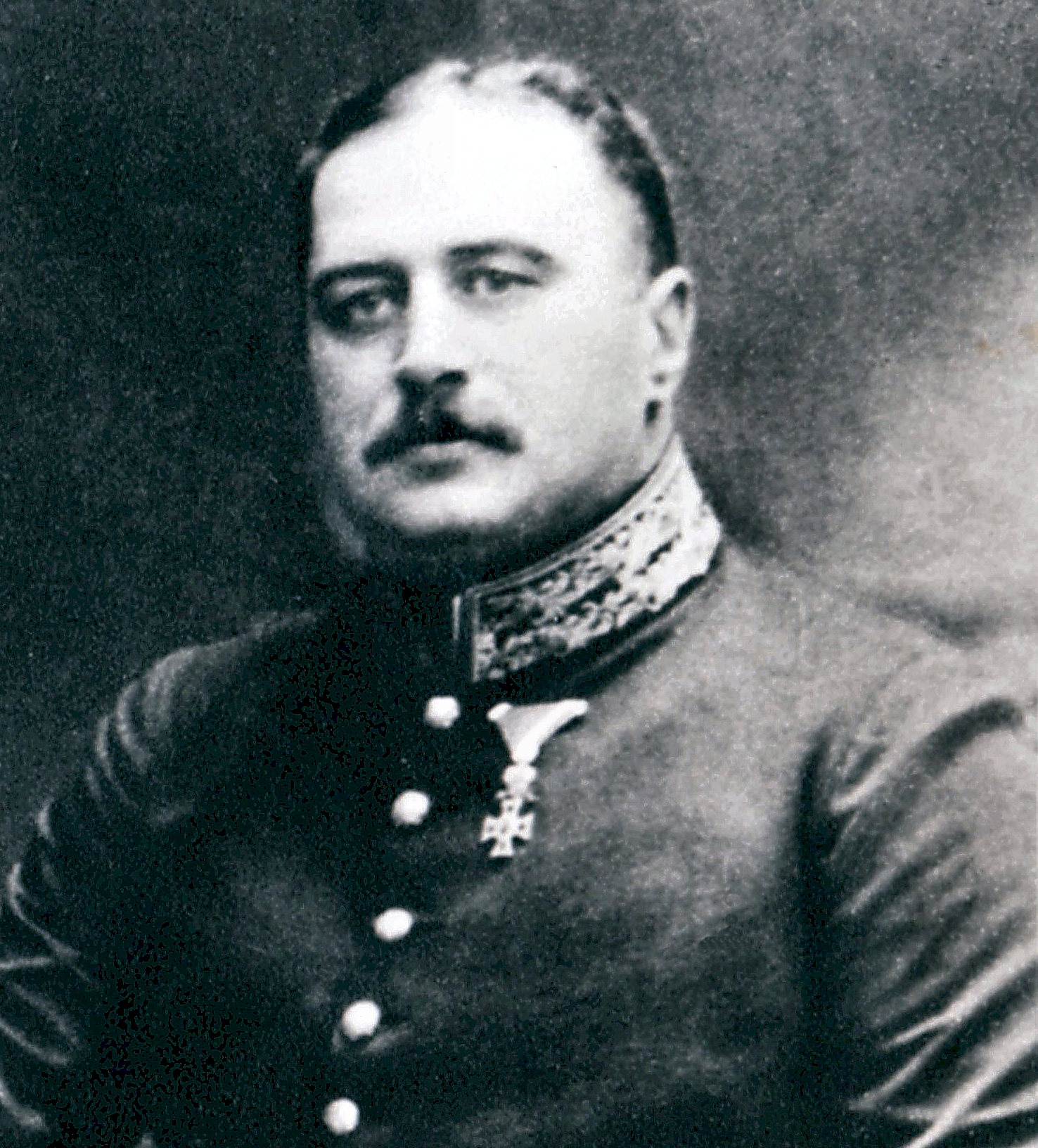
Georg Wassilko von Serecki

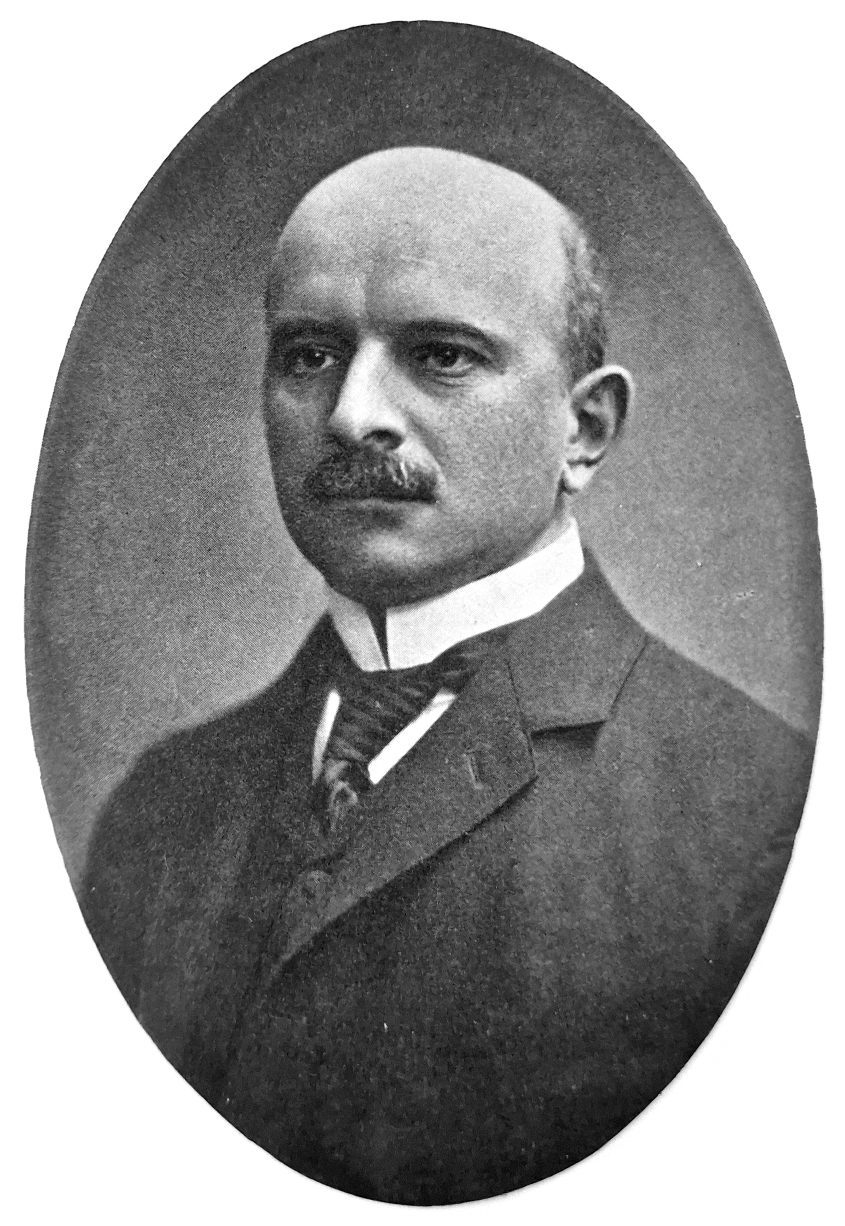
Alexander von Horumzaki
