= Eugene Hackmann =

Romanian politician (1793–1873)

Saint Eugenius of Bukovina
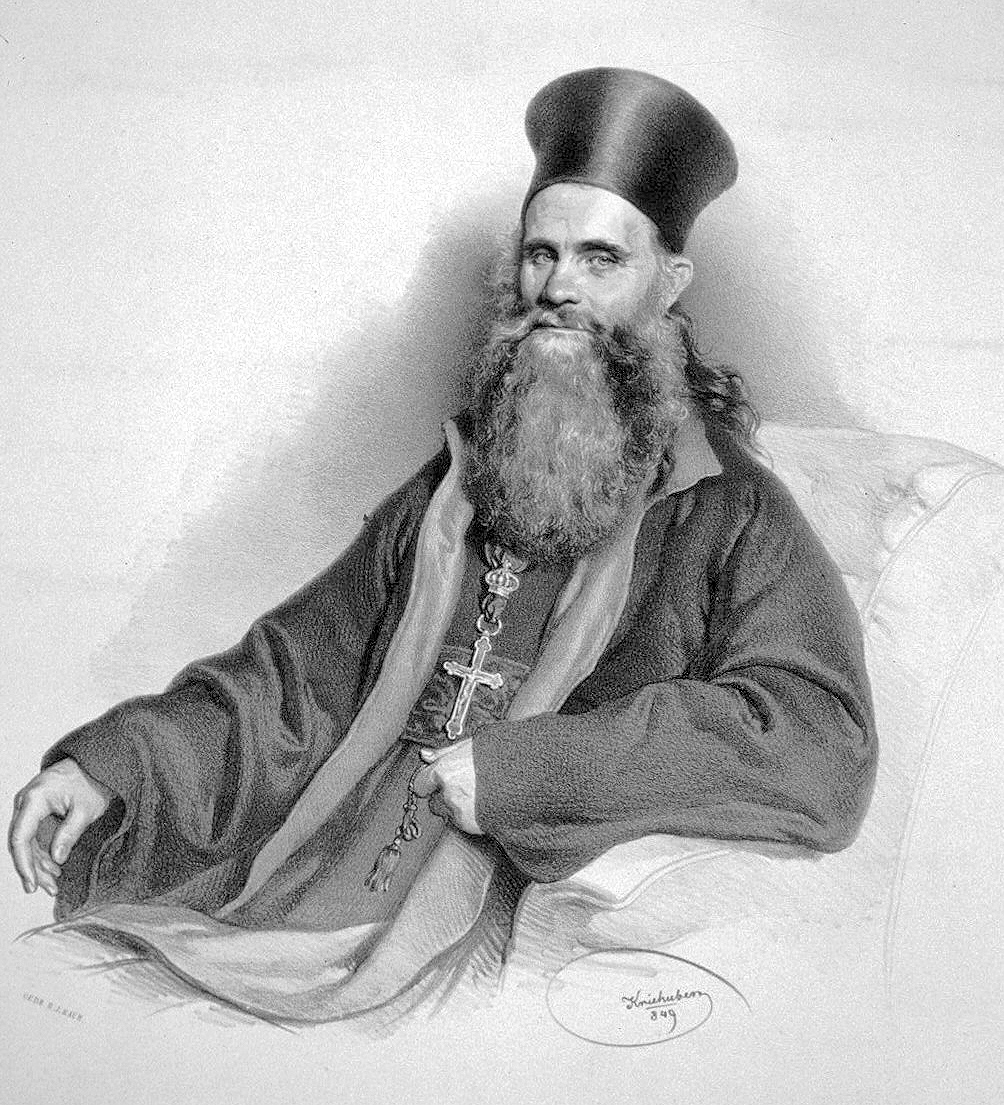
- Metropolitan Eugene Hackmann

Metropolitan of Bukovina and Dalmatia
- Venerated in: Orthodox Church of Ukraine
- Canonized: 2026; 0 years ago by Theognostus, Metropolitan of Chernivtsi and Bukovina
- Patronage: Bukovina
- Church: Eastern Orthodox Church
- Metropolis: Bukovina and Dalmatia
- See: Czernowitz
- Elected: 23 January 1873
- Term ended: 12 April 1873
- Previous post: Bishop of Bukovina (1835–1873)

Orders
- Consecration: 1835

Personal details
- Born: March 16, 1793 Wasloutz, Kingdom of Galicia and Lodomeria, Habsburg Monarchy
- Died: 12 April 1873 (aged 80) Vienna, Austria-Hungary

Landeshauptmann of Bukovina
- In office 1862–1864
- Preceded by: Position established
- Succeeded by: Eudoxiu Hurmuzachi

Personal details
- Party: Constitutional

Metropolitan Eugene Hackmann (Romanian: Mitropolitul Eugenie Hacman,, Ukrainian: Євгеній Гакман; born Eftimie Hacman, 1793 – 31 March / 12 April 1873) was a Romanian Orthodox cleric, Bishop of Bukovina (1835–1873), and later Archbishop of Czernowitz and Metropolitan of Bukovina and Dalmatia (January – March 1873). He also held political offices, being elected Marshal of the Duchy of Bukovina and serving in the Imperial Senate, as well as a Real Privy Councillor.

== Biography ==
Hackmann was born in 1793 in Wasloutz, in present-day Ukraine, into a peasant family originally from the Hotin region. His surname derived from an ancestor who had held the title of hatman; as a patronymic, it was later adapted in Bukovina to “Hackmann” or “Hacman.” After completing secondary education, he attended the Theological School of Czernowitz and then the Faculty of Roman Catholic theology at the University of Vienna, graduating in 1823. During his student years, he taught the Romanian language to Archduke Ferdinand of Austria.

In 1823, he took monastic vows, being ordained hierodeacon and later hieromonk at Dragomirna Monastery. He was appointed catechist at the Trivial School, and later professor of Biblical Studies at the Theological Institute of Czernowitz (1827–1835).

In 1835, appointed by the Emperor, he became Orthodox Bishop of Bukovina. He promoted primary and confessional education, introducing Romanian as the language of instruction at the Theological Institute of Czernowitz in place of Latin, but opposing the adoption of the Latin alphabet. In 1837, he reopened Romanian primary schools; in 1848, he founded a Normal School in Czernowitz, though by 1869 such institutions were converted to state schools with German as the medium of instruction. In 1860, a high school was opened in Suceava.

During his episcopate, the Holy Spirit Cathedral (1844–1864) and the Metropolitan Palace (1864–1882) in Czernowitz were built. As a deputy in the House of Lords, he supported establishing a university in Czernowitz. His authoritarian style, preference for the German language in administration, and support for the Ruthenians over Romanians alienated part of the clergy. He backed the Ruthenian cultural association Ruska Besida and regularly made donations to the poor.

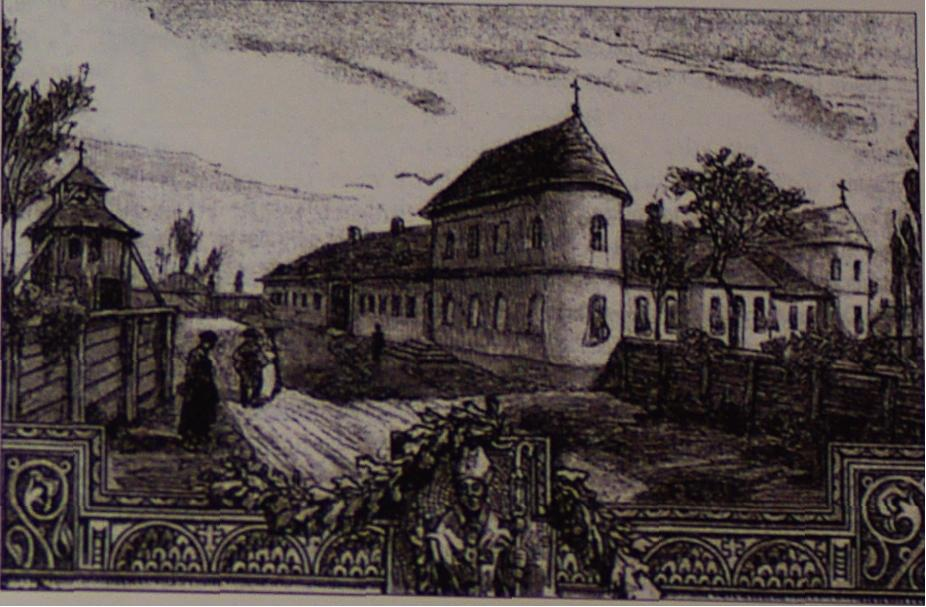
Old episcopal residence in Czernowitz, where Hackmann resided

His decision to favor services in the Ruthenian language at the Metropolitan Cathedral led to Romanian protests in 1866 and 1867. Writer George Sion criticized the lack of national pride among Romanian professors at the seminary during Hackmann’s time. Archpriest Mihai Ivasiuc claimed in 1998 that bishop Hackmann was known among the Romanians as "Eugene the Schismate" (Eugenie Schismatul).

In 1863, he was elected as president of the "Romanian Reunion" organization. However, he did not fulfill his duties, with vicepresident Gheorghe Hurmuzachi acting as the de facto leader. He formally led the organization until 1865.

== Metropolitan of Bukovina and Dalmatia ==
Many Romanians in the Austro-Hungarian Empire supported creating a single metropolitanate for all Orthodox Romanians. Hackmann opposed this, instead advocating for a separate Metropolitanate of Bukovina. In 1861, the Bukovinian clergy voted to elevate the bishopric to metropolitan rank.

In 1862, Romanian leaders from across the empire, including Eudoxiu Hurmuzachi, petitioned Franz Joseph I of Austria for a unified Orthodox metropolitanate independent from the Serbian Orthodox Church. Andrei Șaguna of Transylvania supported including Bukovina, but Hackmann resisted.

On 23 January 1873, the Diocese of Bukovina was elevated to metropolitan rank, incorporating two Slavic dioceses from Dalmatia, and Hackmann was appointed Archbishop of Czernowitz and Metropolitan of Bukovina and Dalmatia. He died suddenly in Vienna on 12 April 1873, before enthronement. He was buried in the Holy Spirit Cathedral and left funds for an almshouse in Czernowitz and a church in his native village. Among those who attended his funeral was the Austrian minister of education, Karl Ritter von Stremayr. His nephew was the Romanian jurist Maximilian Hacman.

Hackmann served as the first Marshal of the Duchy of Bukovina (1862–1864), succeeded by Eudoxiu Hurmuzachi. He was a Commander of the Order of Franz Joseph and an honorary citizen of Czernowitz and Siret. During the monarchy, a street in Czernowitz bore the name Bischof-Hackmann-Gasse.

Because of his pro-Ruthenian policies, Ukrainian historiography often presents him as "an Orthodox cleric of Ukrainian origin", a claim contested by the Romanian historians, who claim that he was "a pure Romanian".

== Canonization ==
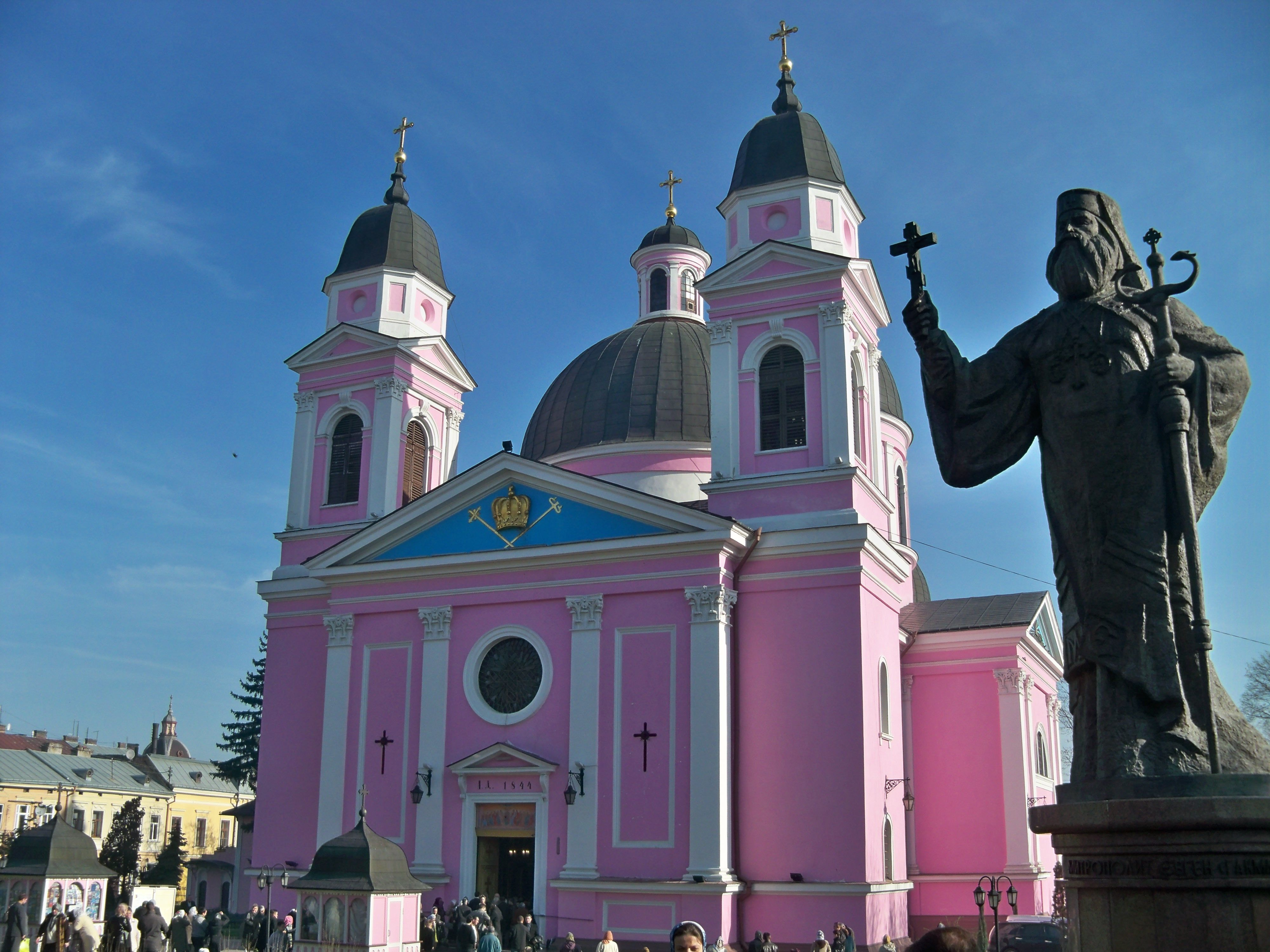
Statue of Metropolitan Eugene in front of the Chernivtsi Metropolitan Cathedral

At the end of the 19th and beginning of the 20th century, several attempts were made to canonize Hackmann. In 1880, Ruthenian protopope Vasyl Prodan petitioned Metropolitan Silvestru Morariu-Andrievici, who formed a commission to examine the case. In 1889, Omelian Popowicz, head of Ruska Besida, also petitioned for his canonization.

In 1903, Metropolitan Vladimir de Repta reopened the process, but it was never completed. In 1914 Hackmann's grave was opened, and his remains were reported to be incorrupted. Under the Soviet rule, in 1976 Hackmann's remains were removed by authorities from the Holy Spirit Cathedral, where he had been buried, and their whereabouts since then have been unknown. In 2024, the Orthodox Church of Ukraine renewed efforts toward his canonization. On 11 May 2026 synod of the Orthodox Church of Ukraine formally canionized Hackmann.

In the Romanian press, this event was viewed with reluctance. The Romanian-language website from the Chernivtsi region, Bucpress, published an article written by Alexandru Vasilachi presenting the metropolitan's controversies and anti-Romanian actions, concluding: "The Orthodox churches in Ukraine present him as a spiritual leader, enlightener, and defender of the Orthodox faith – qualifications that the Romanian community has never shared." On the other hand, Ukrainian historian Andriy Boyda, who considers Hacman to be Ukrainian, calling him the Sheptytsky of Bukovina, praised the gesture, claiming that "he protected Ukrainians from Romanian abuses" and that, thanks to him, Bukovinian Ukrainians were not assimilated by Romanians.

== See also ==
- Teoctist Blajevici
- Arcadie Ciupercovici
