= Wilhelm Lenk von Wolfsberg =

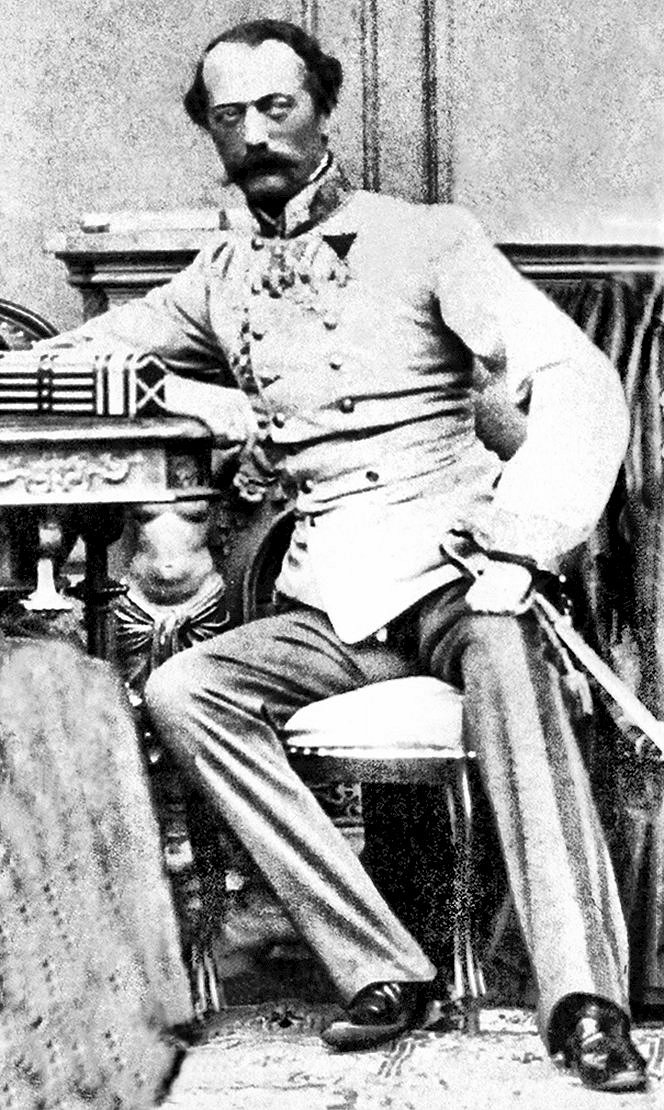
Wilhelm Freiherr Lenk von Wolfsberg in 1865

Nikolaus Wilhelm Freiherr Lenk von Wolfsberg (March 17, 1809, in Budweis, Austria – October 18, 1894, in Troppau, Austria) was an Austrian artillery General (Feldzeugmeister) and scientist, noted for his research and experimentation with gun cotton-trinitrocellulose and improved methods for manufacturing the same. An aristocrat, he was the propriertor of the Corps Artillery Regiment No. 4.

== Biography ==
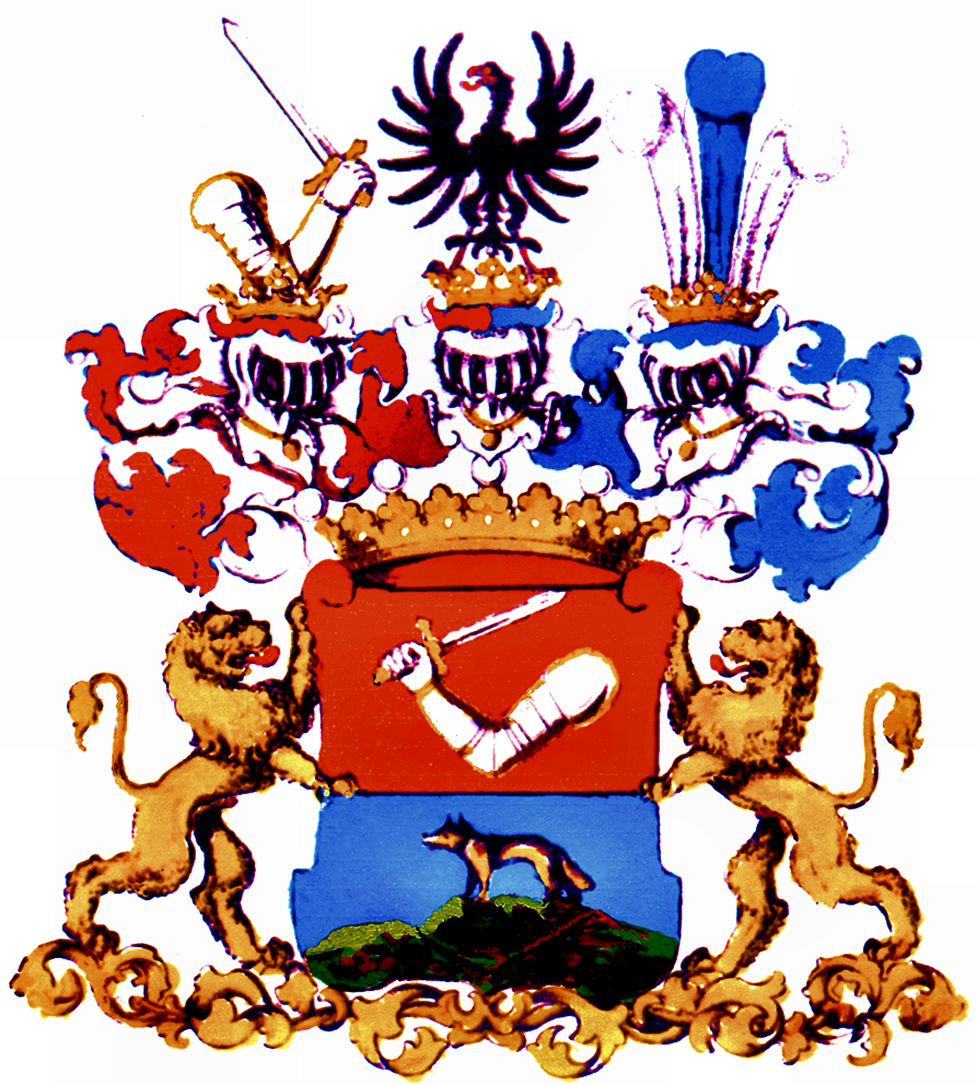
Coat of arms of the Barons Lenk von Wolfsberg, 1829

The young Wilhelm was adjusted in the Artillery regiment Nr. 4 in 1823. He completed the higher course of his artillery training in the Austrian military training centres and the Bombardier Corps in 1826, moved there in 1831 to lieutenant. In the following years, Lenk served as commander of a Bombardier detachment in the federal fortress of Mainz. In 1839, he became first lieutenant in the Field Artillery Regiment Nr. 1, then in 1848 Lieutenant Commander at Prague, as a captain in 1849 at Peterwardein and 1851 at Vienna in the artillery stuff-administrative district of the 2nd Artillery regiment. He was assigned to the General Division Artillery and promoted to major at the end of 1852. Now he could completely dedicate his time to his work in the field of technical chemistry.

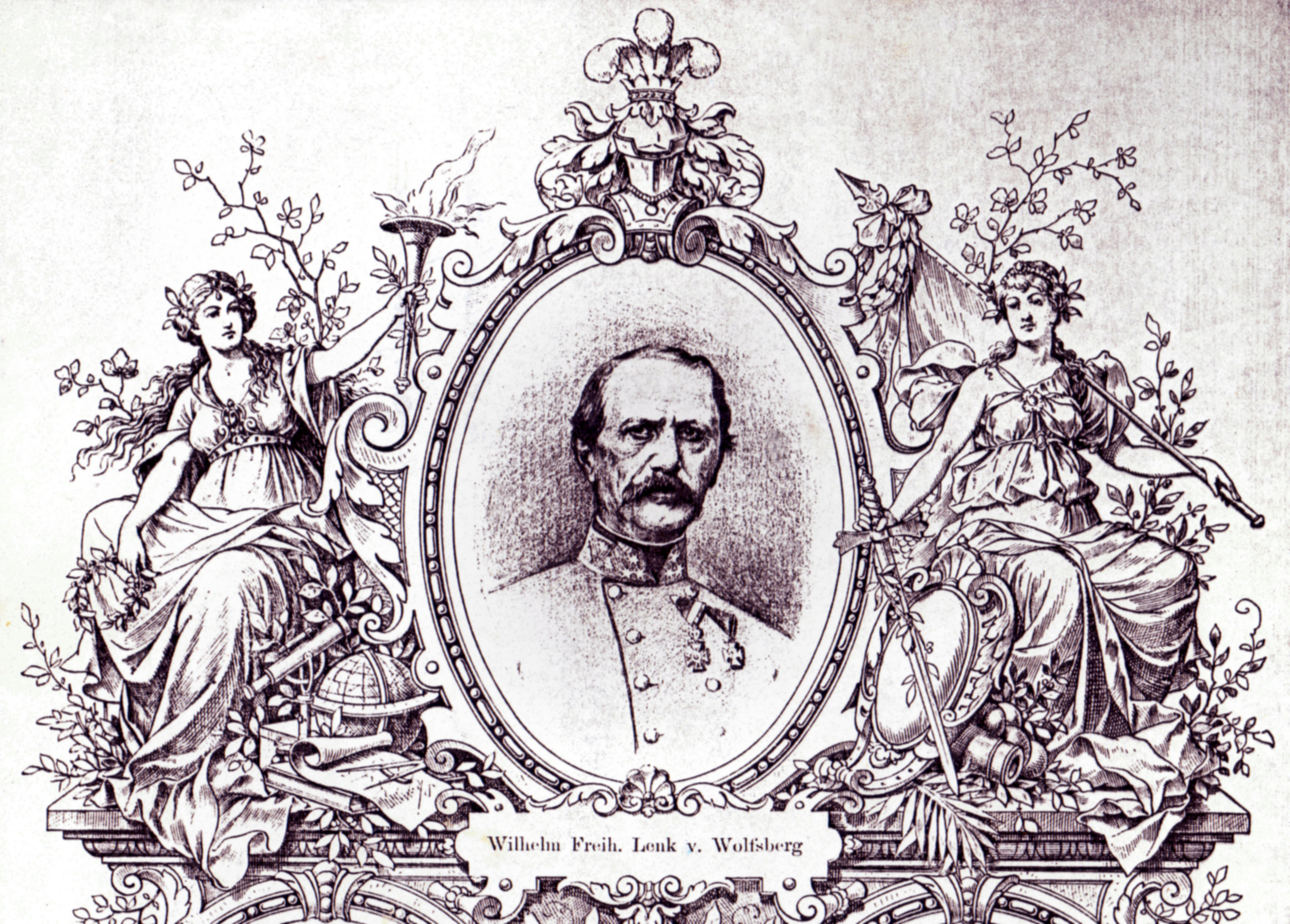
Feldzeugmeister Wilhelm Freiherr Lenk von Wolfsberg 1877

On 1 April 1854, he was appointed lieutenant colonel and chairman of the second Department of General Artillery Directorate (Director of guncotton centre). He remained in this position until he promoted, out of the ranking tour, on 19 February 1861 to brigadier general and was entrusted with the management of the Artillery Committees, then in 1862 followed the appointment as national director of artillery in Vienna.

In this function he became the second owner of the Artillery Regiment No. 1 "Kaiser Franz Joseph" in 1866 and earned through the armouring of the bridgehead Floridsdorf, the fortified camp near Vienna, as chief of artillery great merits during the war of 1866. Therefore, the emperor promoted him on November 9, 1867 (rank from November 13 of the year), to major general (Feldmarschalleutnant), and in 1871 he appointed Wolfsberg to the owner of the Corps Artillery Regiment No. 4. In April 1875, he entrusted him with the command of the fortress of Olmütz, which he headed until his retirement.

On April 1, 1877, he got the rank of Feldzeugmeister and retired at his own request.

== Technical achievements ==
The Baron occupied himself in 1849 with technical work, especially intensive with the improvement and consolidation of the gun cotton trinitrocellulose. He tried to use the guncotton as blowing agent for guns. Therefore, the “K. K. Ärarische Schießwollanstalt” in Hirtenberg, a predecessor of today existing arms factory Hirtenberger AG, was established in 1851. The later Feldzeugmeister succeeded in generating a Trinitrocellulose [C_{12}H_{7}(3NO_{4})O_{10}], that met the military requirements for durability, uniform combustion with high combustion rate and temperature insensitivity up to an ignition point of 136 °C. Concurrently, initiatives were undertaken in France, Russia, and England to implement gun-cotton as a replacement for gunpowder.

Wolfsberg patented the process about his method of controlled compression of the fibre at the guncotton on June 4, 1864. Therefore, he was asked to give lectures in England and France. In France, he was allowed to report Emperor Napoleon III. personally and received from his hand the Commander's Cross of the Legion of Honour and a box provided with his initials and ornate with diamonds. However, by the end of 1865 the production was abandoned prematurely in fear of spontaneous combustion in Austria, due to explosions in two magazines.

Anastasius Grün wrote: "It was a fatal rashness that the method to use guncotton as blowing agent in guns, developed by Major General Lenk of Wolfsberg, was not pursued further after the explosion of a depot. Finally, it was just the Austrian artillery, whose officers and graduates of the Engineering Academy were the main victims of the defeat at the Battle of Königgrätz: the battery of the dead."

Furthermore, Wilhelm invented a good corroborating percussion fuse, a shrapnel grenade, and collapsible tubes for mountain guns. He also gave a construction of the so-called wedge traits for rifled guns. The results convinced and had to go in equipping 30 field batteries.

== Performance from today's perspective ==
His performance is still not forgotten.

- Gerhard Freiherr von Ledebur wrote in his book about the historical representation of the sea mine, that Lenk succeeded in making a Trinitrocellulose, that fulfilled the military requirements for durability and uniform combustion with high efficiency. In the document the "European Association for Chemical and Molecular Sciences"
- Wilhelm Lenk von Wolfsberg is mentioned in the "Inventions of 1849" along with the names of Ebelman, Halliday, Max von Pettenkofer in the field of technological chemistry.
- In the publication in honour on the 150th anniversary of Hirtenberger AG, which was established based on Lenk's desire, Wilhelm is designated there as a man with a revolutionary idea, but its technology was not yet ripe for that time. Ultimately, modern technology use his invention in the arms and ammunition technology since 1990.
- The last mention finally comes from the Austrian Army in 2010: "In 1860 the Austrian officer Wilhelm Lenk von Wolfsberg improved the gun-cotton." Furthermore, the author pointed out to the indispensable additional use of this material for the production of torpedoes, beginning in the 1890s.

== Awards (selection) ==
- Knight of the Royal Prussian Order of the Red Eagle, 3rd Class, 15 May 1850
- Knight of the Imperial Austrian Order of Leopold, 1854
- Order of Saint Stanislaus Second Class, ca. 1860
- Knight of the Royal Prussian Order of the Red Eagle, 2nd Class, 1861
- Commander of the Royal Bavarian Merit Order of St. Michael, 1863
- Commander of the Imperial French Order Legion of Honour, 1864
- Austro-Hungarian Military Merit Cross with War Decoration, 1866
- Imperial Austrian Order of the Iron Crown, 2nd Class, 1872
- Imperial Persian Order of the Lion and the Sun, 1st Class

== Family ==
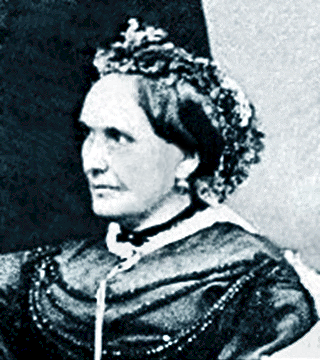
Eva Aloisia Schreher, the general's spouse in 1865

Wilhelm was the son of Jacob Freiherr Lenk von Wolfsberg, Colonel and Knight of the Military Order of Maria Theresa. He married on June 24, 1833, in Mainz Eveline Aloisia Schreher (b. November 2, 1810, Mainz; d. January 7, 1871, Troppau). They had five children. Rudolf (1834-1907), the eldest son, was an Austrian General, too. One of his daughters, Malwine (1839-1866), married the Austrian General Constantin Buol von Wischenau (1822-1893), the youngest, Friederike Berta (1843-1906), was the spouse of the deputy of the Austrian Imperial Council and large landowner's Karl Freiherr Putz von Rolsberg (1852-1921). She was the ancestress of the children of Count Alexander, son of Baron Alexander Wassilko von Serecki.
