= Silvestru Morariu-Andrievici =

Romanian Orthodox cleric

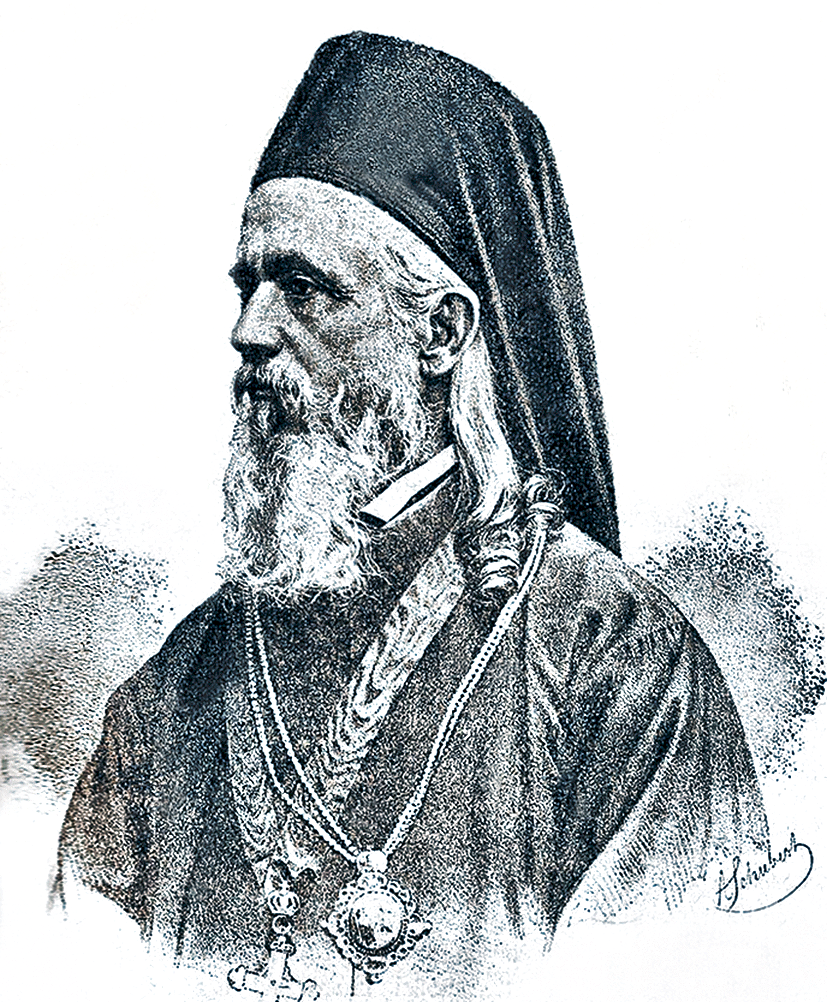
Silvestru Morariu-Andrievici after 1880

Silvestru Morariu-Andrievici (born Samuil Morariu; November 26 [O.S. November 14] 1818–April 15 [O.S. April 3] 1895) was an ethnic Romanian Orthodox cleric in the Duchy of Bukovina, in Austria-Hungary. From 1880 until his death, he served as Metropolitan of Bukovina and Dalmatia.

Born in Mitocu Dragomirnei, north of Suceava, his father Gherasim was the local parish priest, while his mother Zamfira (née Grigorovici) was the daughter of another priest from the same village. A school principal replaced his original surname with the Ukrainian-sounding Andrievici, for purposes of de-nationalization; the authorities restored Morariu upon his request in 1871. After attending primary school in his native village and in Suceava, he went to high school and university at the Cernăuți theological institute, graduating with high honors in 1843. He was a priest at Ceahor (1843-1862), an adviser to the archbishop's council at Cernăuți (1862-1880). He showed great skill as a professor at the diocesan seminary there. He became a monk after his wife's death in 1873, taking the name Silvestru. He rose to the rank of archimandrite and, in 1877, general vicar of the archdiocese. In 1880, Morariu was elected archbishop of Cernăuți and metropolitan of Bukovina and Dalmatia; his consecration took place in Vienna that April. He was an ex officio member of the Diet of Bukovina and the House of Deputies.

While in office, Morariu campaigned for the preservation of ecclesiastical autonomy and for the rights of the province's Romanians. He encouraged the 1889 establishment of Academia Ortodoxă, a society of theology students. He sponsored the painting of the cathedral, and was a patron of the arts. In 1881, he approved the establishment of Armonia Musical Society, which disseminated folk music. He helped expand the network of Romanian-language village schools and ensured their endowment with textbooks. He edited a series of widely circulated textbooks on reading, religion and arithmetic, making him the first author of Romanian textbooks and pedagogical manuals for primary schools in Bukovina. He established the first Romanian press in the province (later named after him) and the church magazine Candela. He was among the first Bukovina Romanians to write sonnets (of which he published four) and fables (Cucoșul curcănit, “The Turkeyed Rooster”). He pushed for the use of Romanian in the Diet. In an 1879 work of church music, he was an early adopter of linear note transcription. He died in Cernăuți.
