= Alexandru N. Hurmuzachi =

Romanian politician

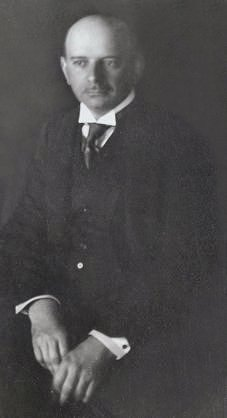
Hurmuzachi in 1904

Alexandru N. Hurmuzachi (March 3, 1869–1946) was an Austro-Hungarian-born Romanian politician.

Born in Cernăuți, the son of Nicolae Hurmuzachi, he graduated from the gymnasium in his native city in 1886 and from the law faculty of Czernowitz University in 1891, earning a doctorate. He was then hired as a civil servant in the Cernăuți finance department. A member of the Romanian Democratic Party and then of the Romanian National Party, he served in the House of Deputies (1904-1918) and in the Diet of Bukovina (1904-1914), where he was president (1911-1914).

In autumn 1918, during the events leading up to the union of Bukovina with Romania, Hurmuzachi displayed a hesitant, conservative attitude, but participated in the Romanian National Council of Bukovina. Afterwards, as a member of the Democratic Union Party, he was elected Senator for Siret in the first parliament of Greater Romania. He was made an officer of the Order of the Crown of Romania in 1898. After the Soviet occupation of Bessarabia and Northern Bukovina, he moved to Sibiu. He died in Geneva.
