= Eudoxiu Hurmuzachi =

Austrian Romanian noble, historian, and politician (1812–1874)

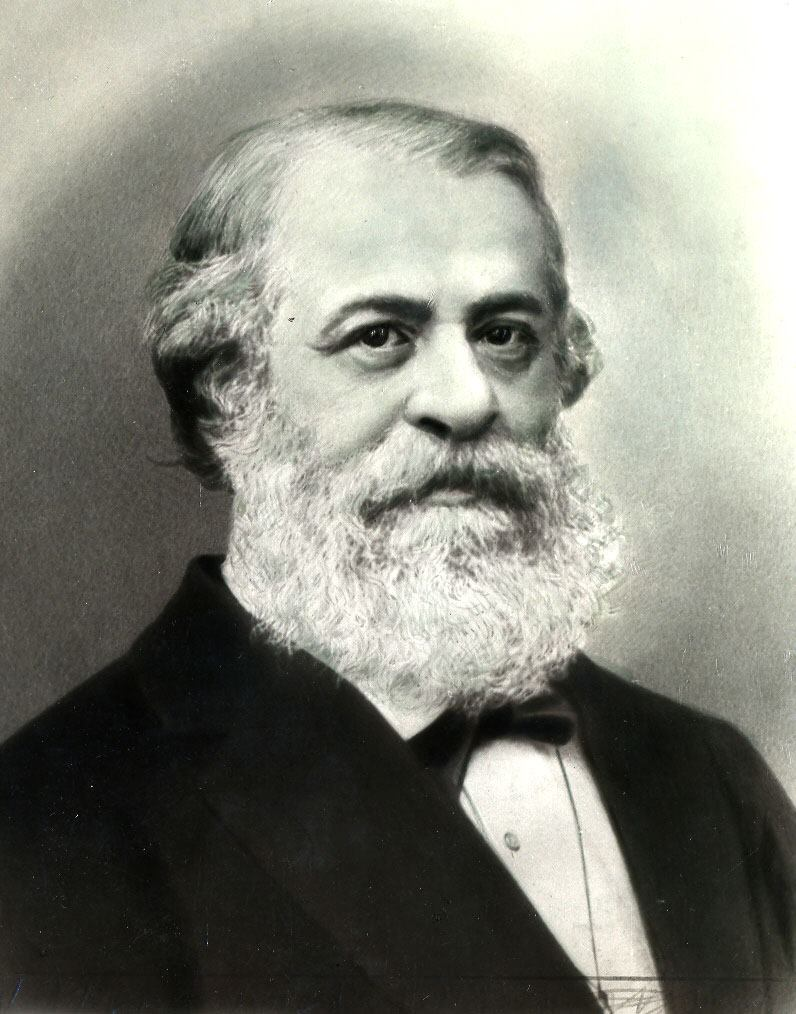

Landeshauptmann of Bukovina
- In office 1862–1870
- Preceded by: Eugenie Hacman
- Succeeded by: Alexander Wassilko von Serecki
- In office 1871–1874
- Preceded by: Alexander Wassilko von Serecki
- Succeeded by: Anton Kochanowski von Stawczan

Personal details
- Born: 29 September 1812 Czernawka, Austrian Empire (now Chornivka, Ukraine)
- Died: 10 February 1874 (aged 61) Czernowitz, Austria-Hungary (now Ukraine)
- Resting place: Chornivka
- Party: Constitutional
- Relations: Hurmuzachi family

Eudoxiu Hurmuzachi (also spelled Eudoxiu Hurmuzache; German: Eudoxius Freiherr von Hormuzaki; 29 September 1812 – 10 February 1874) was a Romanian patriot, historian and politician who served as Landeshauptmann of the Duchy of Bucovina.

== Early life and family ==
Hurmuzachi was born into a family of noble lineage (see Hurmuzachi brothers), as the second son of Doxachi Hurmuzachi, at the family estate in Czernawka, Austria (Romanian: Cernăuca; now Chornivka, Ukraine), located in the historic region of Bukovina. His father used to offer refuge to persecuted Romanian political leaders from Transylvania, and went into considerable debt for this. Together with his brothers, Eudoxiu would become one of the leading figures of the Romanian national movement in Bukovina.

== Career ==
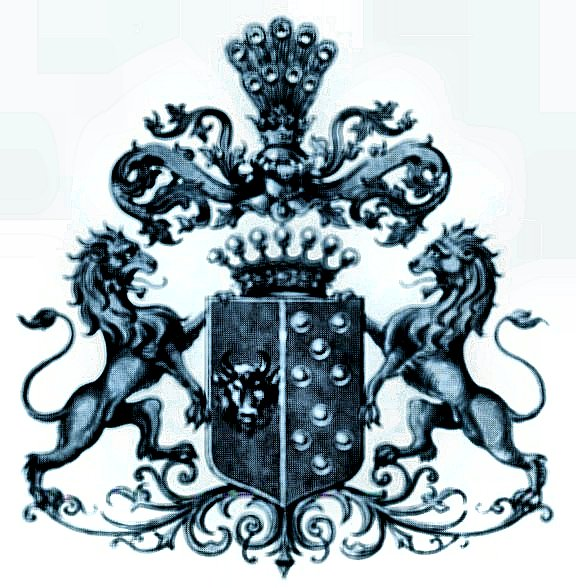
Eudoxius von Hormuzaki Eudoxius von Hormuzaki’s coat of arms

Hurmuzachi went to Vienna to study history; there he experienced the Revolutions of 1848, and decided to interrupt his studies. He returned home and participated in the movement to introduce the Romanian language at the Theological Institute in Czernowitz (now Chernivtsi, Ukraine; known as Cernăuți during Romanian rule), and to establish a Romanian language and literature course at the Institute for Philosophic Studies, also in Czernowitz.

In 1849, he petitioned the Austrian emperor to transform Bukovina into a duchy of the Crown (a "crown land", Kronland in German), with rights equal to those of the other lands and kingdoms of the Austrian Empire; the petition was granted. He also contributed articles to the Bucovina newspaper in Czernowitz between 1848 and 1850. After the political upheaval abated, he returned to continue studying history at the Vienna State Archives. At this time, the inhabitants around Câmpulung Moldovenesc asked him to do research in order to regain lands that had been confiscated from them. He was successful, and the people of Câmpulung erected a small stone monument as a token of their gratitude.

In 1861, he was elected as their representative in both the local council (Diet) of Bukovina and the Imperial Parliament in Vienna. In 1860, when Bukovina was incorporated into Galicia, he petitioned the emperor and the minister to re-establish the autonomy of the province. He was again successful, and Bukovina’s status as a crown land was restored. The emperor then named him captain of Bukovina in 1864. An imperial decree also granted him the title of baron.

On 2 August 1872 he was elected as a member of the Romanian Academy. Throughout his entire career as a historian, he collected and published 12 volumes of historical documents.

== See also ==
- Hurmuzaki Psalter
