= List of villages in Chernivtsi Oblast =

This is a list of villages of Chernivtsi Oblast in alphabetical order categorized by raion. More thorough lists of communities are available for each raion.

== Chernivtsi Raion ==
- Bahrynivka
- Banyliv Pidhirnyi
- Bayraky
- Borivtsi
- Bridok
- Chahor
- Chunkiv
- Kostychany
- Kostyntsi
- Kulivtsi
- Kyseliv
- Luzhany
- Molodiia
- Mykhalcha
- Panka
- Repuzhyntsi
- Shypyntsi
- Shyshkivtsi
- Stara Krasnoshora
- Tarasivtsi
- Toporivtsi
- Tysovets
- Vasyliv
- Verenchanka

== Dniester Raion ==
- Anadoly
- Babyn
- Selyshche

== Vyzhnytsia Raion ==
- Ispas

== See also ==
- List of Canadian place names of Ukrainian origin
