= Kassian Bogatyrets =

Rusyn Eastern Orthodox priest (1868–1960)

Kassian Bogatyrets (Kasyan Bohatyrets)
- Suffragan Bishop of Bukovina
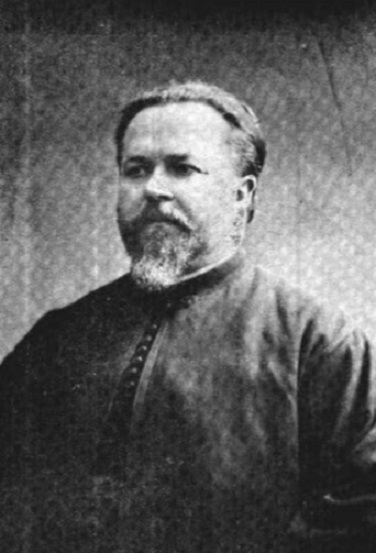
- Bogatyrets in 1911
- Church: Romanian Orthodox Church; Russian Orthodox Church (Ukrainian Exarchate)
- Appointed: 1944
- Term ended: 1945
- Predecessor: Tit Simedrea (as Metropolitan)
- Successor: Theodosius (Kovernynsky)

Orders
- Ordination: 1897 by Arcadie Ciupercovici

Personal details
- Born: November 5, 1868 Kabivtsi–Kabin, Duchy of Bukovina, Austria-Hungary
- Died: July 28, 1960 (aged 91) Chernivtsi, Ukrainian SSR, Soviet Union
- Buried: Chernivtsi Cemetery
- Residence: Metropolitan Palace of Bukovina; Svyato Vvedensky Monastery
- Education: Franz Joseph I University

Kassian Dmitrievich Bogatyrets, or Kasyan Dmytrovych Bohatyrets (Rusyn and Russian: Кассиан Дмитриевич Богатырец; Ukrainian: Касіян Димитрович Богатирець; Romanian: Casian Bohatireț, Bogatireț, Bohatereț, or Bohatyretz; November 5, 1868 – July 28, 1960), was an Eastern Orthodox priest, church historian, and Rusyn community leader in Bukovina. Born a national of Austria-Hungary, he studied theology and history, and served the parish of Sadhora. He drew the suspicion of Austrian authorities attention with his open support for Russophile politics, and was persecuted after visiting the Russian Empire in 1908. He was arrested during the first days of World War I and deported to Sankt Marien, then tried for sedition in Vienna. He was scheduled to be executed by hanging in early 1917, but was freed by a general amnesty shortly before the Austrian monarchy crumbled.

Caught between Romanian and Ukrainian nationalisms, Bogatyrets hoped to obstruct Bukovina's incorporation into Greater Romania, or at least to preserve its autonomy. He eventually joined the Romanian Orthodox Church together with the whole Diocese of Bukovina, including his new parish at Coțmani (Kitsman). His ambitions to improve the standing of Romanian Rusyns were challenged by the Ukrainian National Party, and he remained the leader of a Russophile minority within the larger Ukrainian one. Bogatyrets championed the use of Slavic vernaculars in both education and church services, and did missionary work among the Ukrainians of Maramureș/Maramorosh. He also helped organize the Czechoslovak Orthodox Church on the other side of the border, in Carpathian Ruthenia.

World War II again challenged Bogatyrets' national affiliations, leading him to support reunification with the Russian Orthodox Church. He stayed behind in Soviet territory after the occupation of northern Bukovina but was eventually forced into exile. He lived in Nazi Germany and Romania to 1941, when the German–led invasion allowed him back to Cernăuți (Chernivtsi). For three years, he assisted Metropolitan Tit Simedrea and took over effective leadership of the Diocese when Simedrea left Bukovina. He joined the Ukrainian Exarchate in late 1944, welcoming back the Soviets, but was marginalized from 1949. His final work was as a historiographer of the regional church through its various administrative avatars.

== Biography ==
=== Russophile leader ===
Bogatyrets was born in Kabivtsi–Kabin village, in the northern half of the Duchy of Bukovina (now in Chernivtsi Raion, Ukraine). His family was attested there from the era before the Austrian annexation, when the whole of Bukovina was part of Moldavia. The Bogatyretses had belonged to the rich Moldavian yeomanry (răzeși), but their lands had been scattered between male inheritors before Kassian's birth—his parents, Dmitry and Xenia, were officially registered as "farmers" or "peasants". Like several of his ancestors, Kassian was destined for a priestly career. He studied at the Volksschule and the gymnasium of Czernowitz (Chernivtsi), graduating with honors in 1889, then attended the Orthodox Theology Department of Franz Joseph I University, taking his diploma cum laude in 1893. He also had an interest in Ukrainian folklore, presenting his finds to the (mainly Romanian) Academia Ortodocsă Society of Czernowitz.

On May 11, 1897, he married Stefanida Veligorska, daughter of Priest Alexander from Oshyhliby. In June of the same year he was consecrated a deacon by Arcadie Ciupercovici, the Metropolitan of Bukovina and Dalmatia, taking an administrative position in Sadhora. In September, he officiated alongside Galician Romanian priests at a ceremony in Lemberg (Lviv)—praying for the successful completion of a Romanian church, which had been paid for by ethnographer Teodor Burada. In 1898, Bogatyrets became a Doctor of Divinity from the same Franz Joseph I University, having also taken advanced courses in Slavistics. He was moved from Sadhora to Orshivtsi in 1898, and in the following year to Stanivtsi.

Within that context, Bogatyrets emerged as a figure of importance among the Bukovina Russophiles (or "Old Ruthenians"). The faction was led by Orthodox theologian Eugene Hakman and scholar Jevhen Kozak; its adversaries were "Ukrainophiles", Greek Catholics, and modernizing "Young Ruthenians" such as Hierotheus Pihuliak and Nikolai von Wassilko. The Russophile movement as a whole was discouraged by the Austrian administrators, who backed the Pihuliak faction. When Bogatyrets applied for a lecturer's chair at his alma mater, he received a veto from the Austrian officials and Metropolitan Arcadie. He continued his ministry, receiving commendation. In 1901, he rose to the position of parish priest, and, in this capacity, began a long-lasting career in popular education and political activism, establishing reading rooms and cooperative societies, and spreading Russophile ideas among his parishioners. During elections for the Diet of Bukovina in mid-1904, he was presented as a candidate of the Russian National Party (RNP) for the rural precinct of Waszkoutz. He lost to a Ukrainophile, Theodor Lewicki, 63 votes to 21. He was rumored to have conspired with Alexander von Barbier, a figure from the German community, in his attempt at undercutting Lewicki. The allegation was attributed to Mihail Chisanovici of the Democratic Peasants' Party, who nevertheless stated: "I have not disclosed this or similar information to anyone, and I am not aware of any such pact".

In April 1908, having been granted the honorific title of Exarch, Bogatyrets helped establish the Russkij Club, dedicated to "promot[ing] social life in the Russian districts of Bukovina"; he served as its financial auditor. Later that year, he visited the Russian Empire. At Saint Petersburg, he gave a controversial lecture, taken up by Novoye Vremya newspaper. It suggested that Bukovina had been an integral part of Kievan Rus' (and, as such, that it was a Russian irredenta), while also criticizing the Austrian officials for their Ukrainophile policy. He also earned attention by implying that the RNP was fully aligned with Austria's Christian Social Party. According to a notice in the Bukowinaer Post, this was implicit admission of antisemitism, meaning that, as a politician, Bogatyrets could no longer count on Bukovina Jews to support him. A formal investigation was ordered in Czernowitz. Upon return to Bukovina, which coincided with a major clampdown on Russophile and Rusyn activities, Bogatyrets was demoted to the parish of Verenchanka, west of Zastavna.

=== Clampdown, imprisonment, and return ===
Bogatyrets still contributed to the Rusyn protests of 1909, joining the delegation which petitioned Governor Bourguignon. In early 1910, rumor spread across Austria that he was part of a Russian spy ring, and that he had been deposed by the Metropolitan over this issue. He ran, again unsuccessfully, in the 1911 elections for the Diet, as a candidate and regional leader of the RNP. On April 17, 1912, he led an RNP delegation to the Diet, voicing and his constituents' loyalty toward the Habsburg monarchy and the Austrian state. According to the Czernowitzer Allgemeine Zeitung, Bourguignon was "somewhat surprised" by this apparent change of attitude, which seemed to signal that the Rusyns and Ukrainians were no longer relying on Russian support.

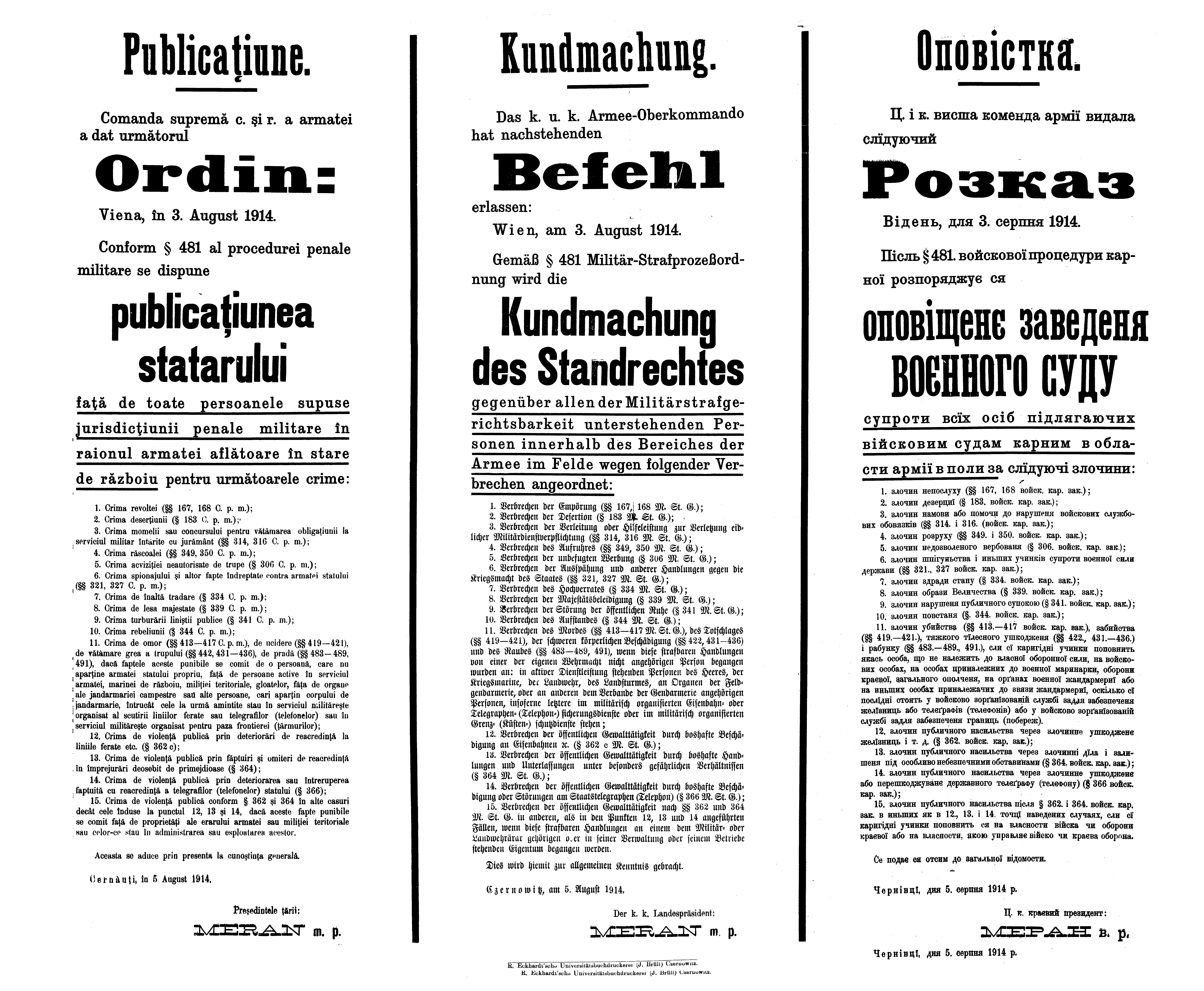
Tri-lingual proclamation by Governor Meran, announcing the introduction of summary executions for crimes of treason and sedition (August 3, 1914)

By January 1914, a renewed clampdown on the "Old Ruthenian" movement left Bogatyrets without his parish. By March, the RNP leadership was facing trial at Lemberg. A sworn witness claimed that Bogatyrets had received 4,000 roubles from his Russian contacts, and had split this sum evenly with an accomplice named Vorobets. In August–September, just as World War I broke out, areas of Bukovina fell to a Russian occupation. Before the Austrian evacuation, Czernowitz's police chief, Konstantin Tarangul von Valea Utsei, ordered Bogatyrets' arrest. He was transferred to an internment camp at Sankt Marien, in Upper Austria, then to the prison-garrison of Vienna. Stefanida was also detained some days after her husband, and deported to Talerhof. Bogatyrets was eventually tried, alongside Hilarion Tsurkanovich (Curkanovič) and 20 other defendants, from September 14, 1916, to February 17, 1917. As he himself later recalled, the indictment was 360 pages in length, all of them "fictitious". He was one of 17 sentenced to death by hanging.

An appeal was filed, although, allegedly, Bogatyrets had refused to ask for clemency. Eventually, under the terms of a general amnesty granted by Emperor Charles, all the defendants were spared punishment, and Bogatyrets was assigned domicile in Graz. In September 1917, Bogatyrets was allowed back in Verenchanka to resume work as a parson. By November 1918, the Austrian monarchy had collapsed. Bukovina, following skirmishes between the Ukrainian Galician and Romanian armies, was occupied by the latter. As the Romanian provisional military administration negotiated a transition to civilian rule, he reemerged as his community's political organizer; the core Ukrainian leadership, including Pihuliak, Stepan Smal-Stotskyi, and Volodymyr Zalozetsky-Sas, had left the region in protest, confident that the Paris Peace Conference would rule in favor of the Ukrainian People's Republic.

For a while, Bogatyrets cooperated with the conservative Romanian Iancu Flondor of the General Congress, who supported regional autonomy for Bukovina within Greater Romania. In June, Romanian General Nicolae Petala heard complaints from a trans-ethnic coalition, expressing support for the autonomy of Bukovina: Bogatyrets was a representative of all Ukrainian groups; others to speak were the Romanians Flondor and George Grigorovici, Germans Albert Kohlruss and Rudolf Gaidosch, and Jews Mayer Ebner and Iacob Pistiner. As the Ukrainian People's Republic lost ground to the rival Ukrainian Soviet Socialist Republic, Bogatyrets signed a plea addressed to the Allies. Presented there by the Czechoslovak delegation, it argued for the creation of a new Ukrainian state—comprising Bukovina, Eastern Galicia, Carpathian Ruthenia, Bessarabia, and Maramureș/Maramorosh. Bogatyrets had included a historical overview, which asserted that Bukovina was ancestrally Ruthenian, and a map, which suggested that the Ukrainians and Rusyns were a majority of the population in Bukovina.

=== In Romanian Bukovina and second exile ===
Eventually, Bukovina was incorporated into the Romanian state. Bogatyrets and Kozak agreed to a boycott of the November 1919 election, noting the Ukrainian-and-Ruthenian liberties were being trampled upon by the authorities. The letter of protest was also signed by their Ukrainophile rivals. Bogatyrets revised this stance within months, running for the Assembly of Deputies in the May 1920 election, at Zastavna. He lost by a large margin (640 to 2,994) to Constantin Krakalia of the Socialist Party. This defeat signaled the ultimate decline of "Old Ruthenian" politics among the Ukrainians of Romania; from 1928, the forefront was taken by Zalozetsky-Sas and his Ukrainian National Party, which formed successful partnerships with mainstream Romanian politicians.

By 1921, Bogatyrets had affiliated with the newly created Czechoslovak Orthodox Church, taking part in its missionary activities among the Ukrainians of Mukačevo. In September 1922, he was granted an audience with the Czechoslovak President, Tomáš Masaryk. A professor emeritus of canon law at his alma mater (re-baptized Carol I University of Cernăuți), he contributed directly to the drafting of the Czechoslovak Church constitution c. 1928. Such activities were also meant to strengthen Carpatho-Russian identity against Ukrainophiles. In early 1927, Václav Klofáč of the Czech National Social Party praised Bogatyrets as an authentic voice of Ruysn nationalism, contrasting him with Andrey Gagatko of the Carpatho-Russian Party (whom he depicted as an impostor and a sellout to the Jews).

Bogatyrets focused his other activities on the administration of the Czernowitz Diocese, by then part of the Romanian Orthodox Church. During January 1923, he joined a delegation of community leaders who publicly reprimanded Ukrainian nationalist youths who had desecrated Romanian symbols. They carried with them an address by the rioters' parents, which they presented to headmaster Alexe Procopovici; this document featured promises to uphold "sincere patriotism" and loyalty toward Ferdinand I, the King of Romania. In 1925, Bogatyrets was elected as a Rusyn representative to the Diocesan Assembly; Petro Katerynyuk represented the Ukrainians, and the other delegates were Romanian. He took up advocacy for both the Ukrainians and the Rusyns of Romania, demanding that school be taught in the native language throughout the Diocese, and asking for an official prayer book (Molitvoslov) for native use. He was especially critical of Romanianization, describing his defense of Rusyn identity as an "impossible fight". In 1926, he resigned from the Assembly, together with a fellow priest, Kalarenchuk. As noted by the Romanian activist Ion Nistor, who was serving in the Senate, the two men invoked "reasons of nationality". In his retort, Nistor noted that they had been tacitly allowed to preach in Russian, but could no longer regard themselves as Russian priests, since there existed "only one Romanian Orthodox church." He suggested that both Bogatyrets and Kalarenchuk be asked to pass a Romanian-language examination.

An Archpriest from 1929, Bogatyrets moved to the parish of Coțmani in 1930 (where he served until 1940), and was also tasked by Metropolitan Visarion Puiu with coordinating missionary activities at Nistru, Maramureș. His work was supposed to ensure a tighter union between the parishes of Maramureș and Bukovina and to combat the influence of Ukrainian Greek Catholics. By 1931, Bogatyrets was involved in a direct dispute over political legitimacy with Zalozetsky-Sas. Bogatyrets found favor with the Romanian Bukovinian Constantin Isopescu-Grecul, who recognized him as "the true leader" and "a person of great character". In mid-1931, he was serving on the presidium of the "Bukovina Russian Minority Organization", alongside Jevhen Kozak and B. Velihorschi. Together, the three men addressed a congratulatory telegram to Nicolae Iorga, who had been made Prime Minister of Romania, expressing a wish to join Iorga's National Union; they also noted that the Union was supportive of "ethnic [and] cultural rights" for the Rusyns, who shared the Romanians' history of persecution by the Austrians. Bogatyrets' campaign for linguistic pluralism ended abruptly in April 1937, when the Diocesan Council ruled in favor of disciplinary sanctions for priests who took up languages other than Romanian in their sermons or at Sunday school. However, in 1939, the Romanian state authorized Bogatyrets to receive and wear the Gold Cross of Merit, awarded by the Second Polish Republic. In June of that year, he lectured in Zastavna about the recently deceased Miron Cristea, the Patriarch of All Romania, and toasted to the health of King Carol II.

In July 1940, following a Soviet ultimatum, the Romanian administration withdrew from northern Bukovina. Bogatyrets and another 131 parish priests of the Diocese stayed behind in Soviet territory, under a Russian Orthodox bishop, Damaskin (Malyuta). Bogatyrets declared himself a Ukrainian by nationality—although, according to the Rusyn researcher S. G. Sulyak, he only did so under pressure to conform with the Soviet policy on nationalities. In short time, the regime began nationalizing all Church property and stopped the payment of salaries, deporting some of the clergy to the Gulag. The priests complained and asked to be allowed back into the Romanian Church; the authorities responded by letting them leave the country. As a result, all but 22 of the parish priests crossed the border into Nazi Germany and Occupied Poland.

Bogatyrets was one of those who seized this opportunity, leaving with Stefanida and his two children (Nicolae and Nadezhda). They would spend some six months at Leubus Monastery, Gau Silesia, where Father Kassian treated his illness and did research in the library. He was registered as a refugee in the Leubus camp for prisoners-of-war, and visited there by the Romanian Commission. Eventually, the Commission obtained that he and his family be returned to Romania, where Bogatyrets served as a parish priest in Monteoru. In July 1941, the German–led attack on the Soviet Union brought the Romanian administration back into northern Bukovina. After protracted negotiations, the Bogatyretses were also allowed to return to Bukovina in September, settling in Cernăuți. Tit Simedrea, the new head of Bukovina Diocese, made Father Cassian his confessor, assigned to Intrarea în biserică (Svyato Vvedensky) Monastery.

=== Soviet years ===
In March 1944, as northern Bukovina fell back to the Soviets, Metropolitan Simedrea took refuge in Romania with most of the Bukovina clergy, but Bogatyrets did not follow. Aware of the improved status of the Russian Church and disappointed by the Romanianization campaign under Ion Antonescu, he decided to continue with the Diocese. He welcomed the Red Army, and provided some thousands of roubles in donations for the war effort. He became suffragan bishop, preparing full communion with the Russian Church, and eventually handing over leadership to Metropolitan Theodosius of the Ukrainian Exarchate. The transitional process recognized all of the Romanian ordinations, but made a return to the Julian calendar. While overseeing these changes as suffragan or as Theodosius' assistant, Bogatyrets simultaneously served as confessor at Svyato Vvedensky (which became the diocesan seat upon his eviction from the Metropolitan Palace) and head priest at St. Nicolas Cathedral in Chernivtsi (Czernowitz).

Stefanida Bogatyrets died on August 31, 1944, leaving him to enter monastic life; her children, meanwhile, had emigrated to France. Kassian spent much of the following year writing Краткую историю Буковинской епархии ("A Brief History of the Bukovina Eparchy"), on behalf of Metropolitan Theodosius and the Russian Synod. He continued work on an extended version, asking Theodosius' permission to study the Bukovinian archive in Kiev—although he probably never managed to do so. Following requests from the Ukrainian SSR government and the Museum of Local Lore, he wrote historical notices on the Metropolitan Palace and the local spread of the Lipovan, Baptist, Pentecostal and Adventist churches. In 1946, he was made a Stavrophore and received from the Soviet state the Medal "For Valiant Labour in the Great Patriotic War 1941–1945".

Although he could not persuade the Soviets to return the Metropolitan Palace, nor to grant permission for a pastoral magazine, Bogatyrets managed to obtain the resumption of theological training at the university, and obtained their support for his anti-sectarian missionary work. Late in 1947, Theodosius, who was taking a new seat at Kirovograd, recommended Bogatyrets as his replacement in Chernivtsi, highlighting his scholarly competence and Russophile stances. This proposal was dismissed by Patriarch Alexius, who considered Bogatyrets politically unreliable. The church effectively demoted him to the rank of Protoiereus, since the rank of Archpriest was unused in Russian Orthodoxy. However, in 1955 the consistory provided him with a monthly pension of 2,000 roubles, citing his contribution to church life during the Austrian era, as well as his scientific work. Bogatyrets was also snubbed by the Soviet state. His house on Pravda Street was nationalized in 1949, and he moved with his books to an apartment on Kvitki-Osnovyanenko. He was only granted citizenship and a Soviet Union passport in 1954.

Bogatyrets retired from his ministry in 1955, after a serious illness, and bequeathed his books to the church. He died on July 28, 1960. He was buried two days later at the family crypt in Chernivtsi Cemetery, with a large funeral procession attended by his former parishioners. He had not finished his life's work as a historian, История Буковинской епархии ("History of the Bukovina Eparchy"), never having started the planned chapters on church history after 1950. Days after his burial, the KGB confiscated many of his books, and the manuscript was presumed lost; however, a typewritten copy had been kept by Bogatyrets' niece, Evgenya V. Gorzhu. The work also doubled as a compendium of regional history, from the Scythians, Dacians and Bolokhoveni to the author's day. Much interest was paid to the persecution of the church under the Austrians, and to Rusyn–Romanian struggles for control of the Diocese. Bogatyrets' text also contained noted factual errors, misdating the first use of the name "Bukovina" to 1392 (instead of the historical 1412); details on church history under the 1914 Russian occupation and much of World War II were entirely absent.
