= Crăsnișoara =

Crăsnișoara is the Romanian name for two villages in Storozhynets Raion, Ukraine:

- Crăsnișoara Nouă, or Nova Krasnoshora village in Chudei Commune
- Crăsnișoara Veche, or Stara Krasnoshora Commune
