= Rusescu =

Rusescu is a Romanian surname. Notable people with the surname include:

- Alfred Rusescu (1895–1981), Romanian pediatrician
- Maria Rusescu (born 1936), Romanian painter
- Raul Rusescu (born 1988), Romanian footballer
