= Nova Zhadova =

Village in Chernivtsi Oblast, Ukraine

Coordinates: 48°13′34″N 25°32′18″E

Nova Zhadova (Ukrainian: Нова Жадова; Romanian: Jadova Nouă; German: Neu Zadowa) is a village in Chernivtsi Raion, Chernivtsi Oblast, Ukraine. It belongs to Storozhynets urban hromada, one of the hromadas of Ukraine.

Until 18 July 2020, Nova Zhadova belonged to Storozhynets Raion. The raion was abolished in July 2020 as part of the administrative reform of Ukraine, which reduced the number of raions of Chernivtsi Oblast to three. The area of Storozhynets Raion was merged into Chernivtsi Raion.
