= Vasile Tarnavschi =

Imperial Austrian-born Romanian theologian

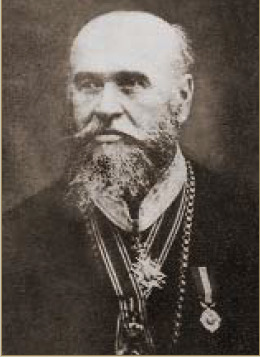
- Vasile Tarnavschi as Rector of the Cernăuți University
- Born: November 11, 1859; Mihalcea, Duchy of Bukovina, Austrian Empire
- Died: February 4, 1945 (aged 85); Cernăuți, Soviet Union (now Chernivtsi, Ukraine)
- Education: University of Czernowitz
- Known for: Old Testament exegesis; Rector of the University of Czernowitz; Academic theology in Bukovina
- Scientific career
- Fields: Theology, Biblical studies

Vasile Tarnavschi (December 16, 1859 – February 4, 1945) was an Imperial Austrian-born Romanian theologian.

Born in Mihoveni, in Austrian-ruled Bukovina, he attended high school in Suceava from 1870 to 1878, followed by the theology faculty of Czernowitz University from 1878 to 1882. After earning his doctorate there in 1886, he undertook specialized studies in the Old Testament and Semitic languages at Vienna, Breslau and Berlin from 1898 to 1900. He served as a priest in Stroiești from 1887 to 1889, as a priest and religion teacher in Suceava from 1889 to 1896 and as a priest in Czernowitz (Cernăuți) from 1896 to 1898.

After the death of Isidor Onciul in 1897 and resulting vacancy of the Old Testament and Hebrew language professorate in the Czernowitz theology faculty, Tarnavschi was hired as a teaching assistant for those subjects in 1900. In 1903, he was promoted to substitute professor, and was full professor from 1906 to 1932. For a time, he was a substitute in the practical theology department, and taught non-mandatory courses on Aramaic, Syriac and Arabic. He served five terms as faculty dean and, from 1918 to 1920, was the first rector of the university after Bukovina passed under Romanian administration.

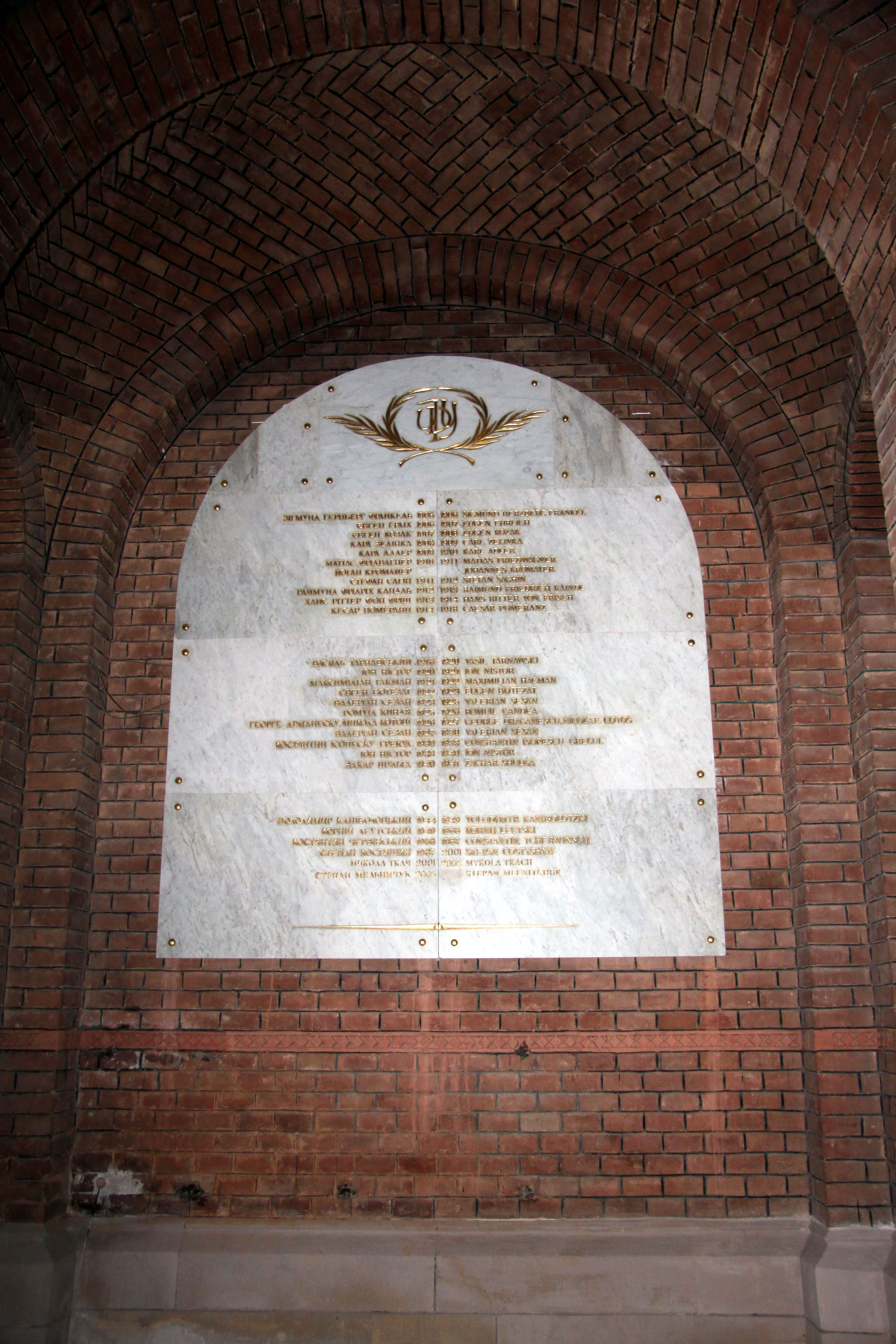
Plaque dedicated to the rectors of the University of Chernivtsi, also mentioning Vasile Tarnavschi (as Vasil Tarnawski)

He directed and edited Candela magazine from 1923 to 1932 and, from 1923 to 1924, was president of the Bukovina clergy association. His teaching and particularly his published work places him at the forefront of Romanian Orthodox Old Testament theologians. His research into exegesis and theology culminated in two books: Întroducere în sfintele cărți ale Testamentului Vechi (1928) and Arheologie biblică (1930); the latter remained in use as a general reference for decades. Tarnavschi died in Bucharest.
