= Bobești =

Bobești may refer to:

- Bobești, a village in Duda-Epureni Commune, Vaslui County, Romania
- Bobești, the Romanian name of Bobivtsi, Chernivtsi Oblast, Ukraine
- Bobești, a former village in Glina, Ilfov, Romania
