= Tysovets =

Tysovets may refer to the following places in Ukraine:

- Tysovets, Chernivtsi Oblast, village in Storozhynets Raion, Chernivtsi Oblast
- Tysovets, Skole Raion, village in Skole Raion, Lviv Oblast
