= Ruslan Platon =

Ukrainian footballer (born 1982)

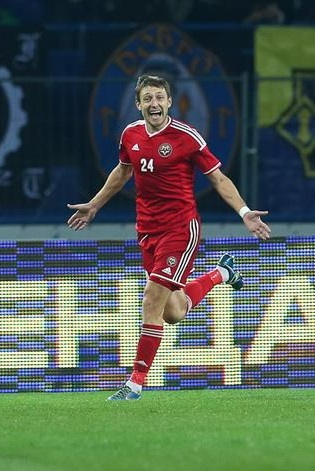

Personal information
- Full name: Ruslan Serhiyovych Platon
- Date of birth: 12 January 1982 (age 44)
- Place of birth: Sniachiv, Ukrainian SSR, Soviet Union
- Height: 1.83 m (6 ft 0 in)
- Position: Forward

Youth career
- RUFK (Kyiv)

Senior career*
Years	Team	Apps	(Gls)
2000–2001	Bukovyna Chernivtsi	39	(3)
2001–2007	Karpaty Lviv	94	(10)
2001–2004	→ Karpaty-2 Lviv	76	(18)
2001–2003	→ Halychyna-Karpaty Lviv	13	(6)
2007–2009	FC Kharkiv	30	(3)
2008	→ Zakarpattia Uzhhorod (loan)	11	(2)
2009–2012	Tavriya Simferopol	47	(8)
2012–2013	Bukovyna Chernivtsi	18	(13)
2013–2015	Metalurh Zaporizhya	39	(8)
2016–2017	TSK Simferopol	39	(13)
2017–2018	Artek Yalta	16	(16)
2019	Favorite-VD-Kafa Feodosia	13	(5)
2019	Mriya Yalta	5	(1)
2020	Gvardeyets Gvardeyskoye	5	(2)
- * Club domestic league appearances and goals

Ruslan Platon (born 12 January 1982) is a Ukrainian former professional footballer who played as a forward.

== Career ==
Platon played the second half of the 2007–08 season on loan at Zakarpattia Uzhhorod, and returned to play for Kharkiv next season. In July 2009, he signed for Tavriya Simferopol. He played for Metalurh Zaporizhya in the Ukrainian First League.
