= Radu Bercea =

Romanian painter and former prisoner

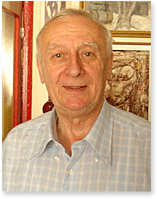
- Born: August 29, 1939 (age 86); Cuciurul Mare, Cernăuți, Bucovina
- Citizenship: Romanian
- Occupation: Painter
- Spouse: Olga
- Children: 3 ( Manuela; Ștefan; Oana)
- Parent(s): Eugenia and Teofil
- Website: http://www.radubercea.com

Radu Bercea (born August 29, 1939) is a Romanian painter and illustrator, and former prisoner under the Socialist Republic of Romania.

== Biography ==
Radu went on to study art at the Octav Băncilă School of Fine and Decorative Arts in Iași. Under the communist regime, between 1959 and 1964, he was politically persecuted for his pro-Western beliefs. During his detention in the extermination camps, he met a number of prominent figures from the Romanian intellectual community, such as Alexandru Paleologu, academic Alexandru Zub, poet Alexandru Ivasiuc, and architect Crașoveanu. He was granted amnesty by a decree issued in the spring of 1964, imposed by international human rights bodies and the UN.

== Published work ==
- Memoria retinei gulagului românesc (2007)
- Deportații/via Dolorosa/Bărăgan (2010) – with Nicolae Ianăși
- Țara lui tercea-Bercea (2010)
- Mărturii din infern (2011)
- Bucovina mărturisită de Radu Bercea (2013).

== Bibliography ==
- Emil Satco: Encyclopedia of Bucovina, Vol. I, Princeps Publishing House, 2004, ISBN 973-7730-05-4, pp. 444–446
- Emil Satco, Ioan Pînzar: Notable Figures of Bucovina. Dictionary, vol. VIII, Bucovina Library and Bucovina Cultural Foundation, 1997, ISBN 973-0-00376-9, 219 pp.
- Emil Satco: Art in Bukovina. A Bibliographic Guide, vol. I, Suceava, County Library, 1984, 300 pp.
