= Storozhynets urban hromada =

Urban hromada in Chernivtsi Oblast, Ukraine

Storozhynets urban hromada Сторожинецька міська громада
- Hromada
- Interactive map of Storozhynets urban hromada
- Country: Ukraine
- Oblast: Chernivtsi
- Raion: Chernivtsi

Area
  - Total: 496.27 km^{2} (191.61 sq mi)

Population (2018)
  - Total: 38,680
  - Density: 77.94/km^{2} (201.9/sq mi)
- Settlements: 17
- Cities: 1
- Villages: 16

Storozhynets urban territorial hromada (Ukrainian: Сторожинецька міська територіальна громада, romanized: Storozhynetska miska terytorialna hromada) is a hromada of Ukraine, located in the western Chernivtsi Oblast. Its administrative centre is the city of Storozhynets. According to the 2001 Ukrainian census, out of 40,848 inhabitants, 33,617 spoke Ukrainian as their mother tongue (83.04%), whereas 5,878 spoke Romanian (14.52%), out of which 5,799 said that they spoke Romanian (14.32%) and 79 called it Moldovan (0.19%), 1,099 spoke Russian (2.69%) and 204 spoke Polish (0.5%).

== Settlements ==
In addition to one city (Storozhynets), there are 16 villages within the hromada:

- Banyliv Pidhirnyi
- Bobivtsi
- Davydivka
- Dibrivka
- Komarivtsi
- Kosovanka
- Kostyntsi
- Nova Zhadova
- Novi Broskivtsi
- Panka
- Ropcha
- Sloboda-Komarivtsi
- Stara Zhadova
- Yaseny
- Zabolottia
- Zrub-Komarivskyi
