= Davydivka =

Commune in Chernivtsi Oblast, Ukraine

Coordinates: 48.1375°N 25.5444°E

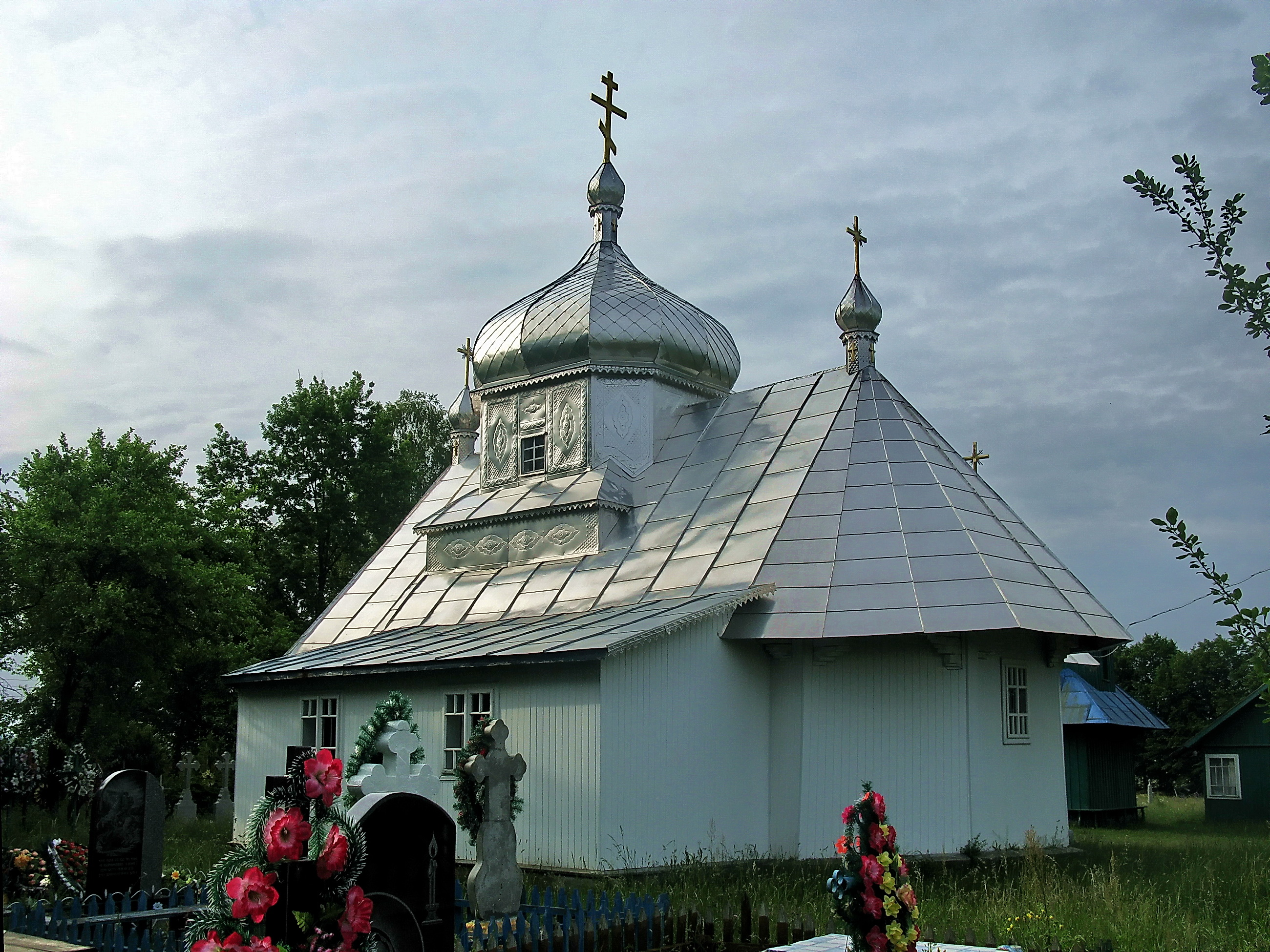
St Parascheva Church

Davydivka (Ukrainian: Давидівка; Romanian: Davideni; German: Dawideny) is a village in Chernivtsi Raion, Chernivtsi Oblast, southwestern Ukraine. It belongs to Storozhynets urban hromada, one of the hromadas of Ukraine.

Located in the Ukrainian part of the historic Bukovina region, the commune is situated on the Siret river at an altitude of 432 metres (1,417 ft). As of 2001, it had 3115 inhabitants.

Historically part of the Principality of Moldavia, the area became part of the Habsburg monarchy in 1775. Since 1849, it was incorporated into the Storoschinetz district of the Duchy of Bukovina, a crown land of the Austrian Empire and Austria-Hungary. After World War I, it became part of the newly established Storojineț County in the Kingdom of Romania. According to the Nazi–Soviet Pact of 1939, the region was annexed by the Soviet Union and incorporated into the Storozhynets Raion of the Ukrainian Soviet Socialist Republic. The German population was resettled to Nazi Germany, while Romanian citizens were subjected to persecution. Two years later, when the Nazi invasion of the Soviet Union was launched, the area was re-occupied by Romanian forces. The members of the local Jewish community were deported to Bessarabia and Transnistria, where most of them were killed. The region was reconquered by advancing Red Army forces in 1944; it became part of independent Ukraine in 1991.

Until 18 July 2020, Davydivka belonged to Storozhynets Raion. The raion was abolished in July 2020 as part of the administrative reform of Ukraine, which reduced the number of raions of Chernivtsi Oblast to three. The area of Storozhynets Raion was merged into Chernivtsi Raion.

== Notable people ==
- Joseph Schmidt (1904–1942), tenor.
