= Velykyi Kuchuriv =

Commune in Chernivtsi Oblast, Ukraine

Coordinates: 48.2144°N 25.9072°E

Velykyi Kuchuriv (Ukrainian: Великий Кучурів; Romanian: Cuciurul Mare; German: Kuczurmare or Kuczumare) is a village in Chernivtsi Raion, Chernivtsi Oblast, Ukraine. It hosts the administration of Velykyi Kuchuriv rural hromada, one of the hromadas of Ukraine.

== History ==
Founded as a village of the medieval principality of Moldavia and first mentioned in a document from 1422, it was ceded along with what became known as Bukovina by the Ottoman suzerain in 1774 to the Habsburg Dynasty (Austria). In 1918, Bukovina became part of the Kingdom of Romania. In 1930, 88,4% of the inhabitants of Cuciurul Mare were Romanians. Nowadays the overwhelming majority of the population is Ukrainian.

Until 18 July 2020, Velykyi Kuchuriv belonged to Storozhynets Raion. The raion was abolished in July 2020 as part of the administrative reform of Ukraine, which reduced the number of raions of Chernivtsi Oblast to three. The area of Storozhynets Raion was merged into Chernivtsi Raion.

== Notable people ==
- Mircea Streinul (1910–1945), Romanian prose writer and poet
- Radu Bercea (b. 1939), Romanian painter and graphic artist, political convict during the Communist regime in Romania
