= Cheresh =

Commune in Chernivtsi Oblast, Ukraine

Coordinates: 48.0978°N 25.6108°E

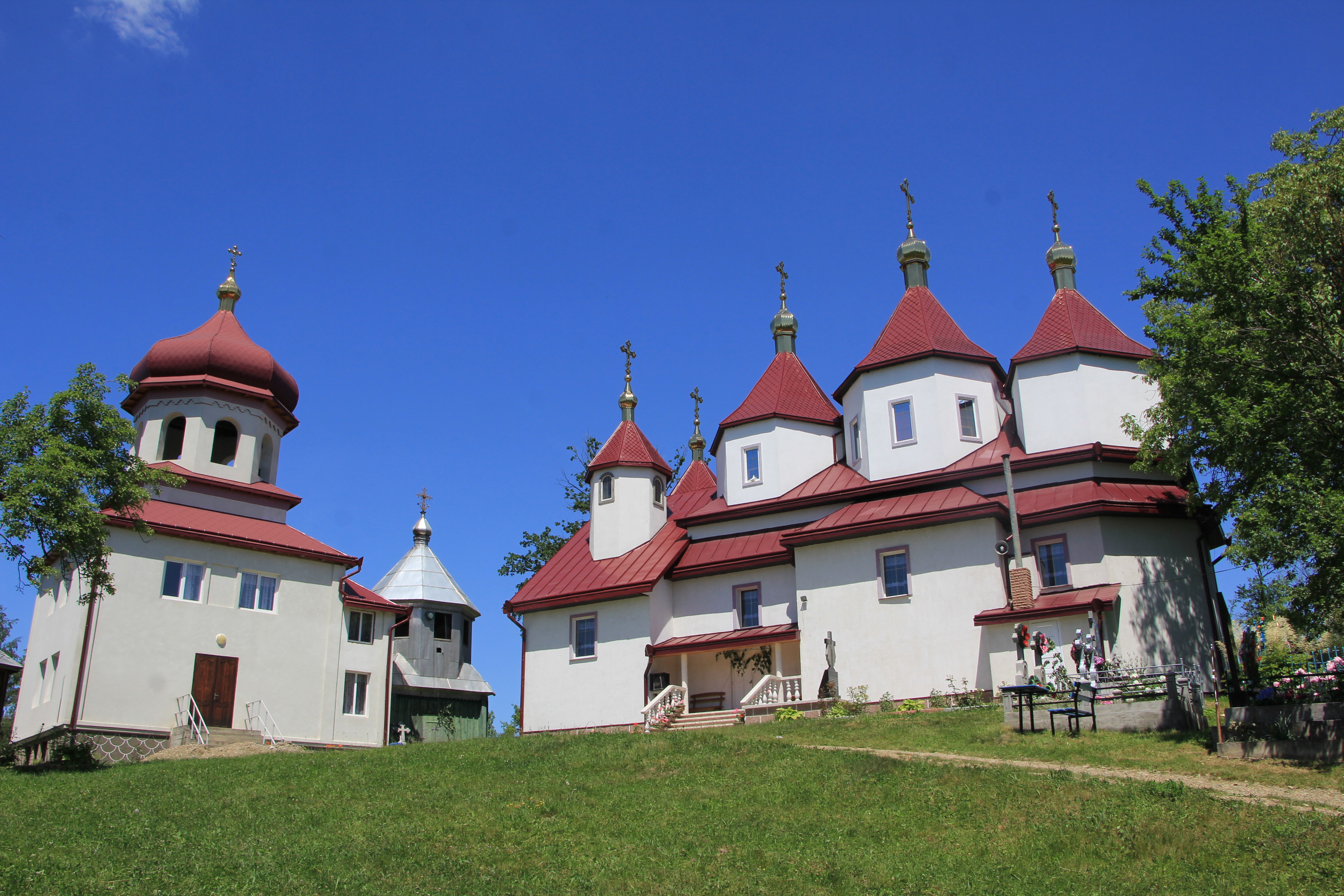
Wooden Church of St. Dmitry 1821 village Cheresh

Cheresh (Ukrainian: Череш; Romanian: Cireș; Polish: Cziresz; German: Cziresz) is a commune (selsoviet) in Chernivtsi Raion, Chernivtsi Oblast, Ukraine. It is composed of a single village, Cheresh. It belongs to Chudei rural hromada, one of the hromadas of Ukraine.

Until 18 July 2020, Cheresh belonged to Storozhynets Raion. The raion was abolished in July 2020 as part of the administrative reform of Ukraine, which reduced the number of raions of Chernivtsi Oblast to three. The area of Storozhynets Raion was merged into Chernivtsi Raion. In 2001, 71.76% of the inhabitants spoke Romanian as their native language, while 25.69% spoke Ukrainian, and 2.04% spoke Russian.
