= Șcheia, Suceava =

Șcheia
- Commune
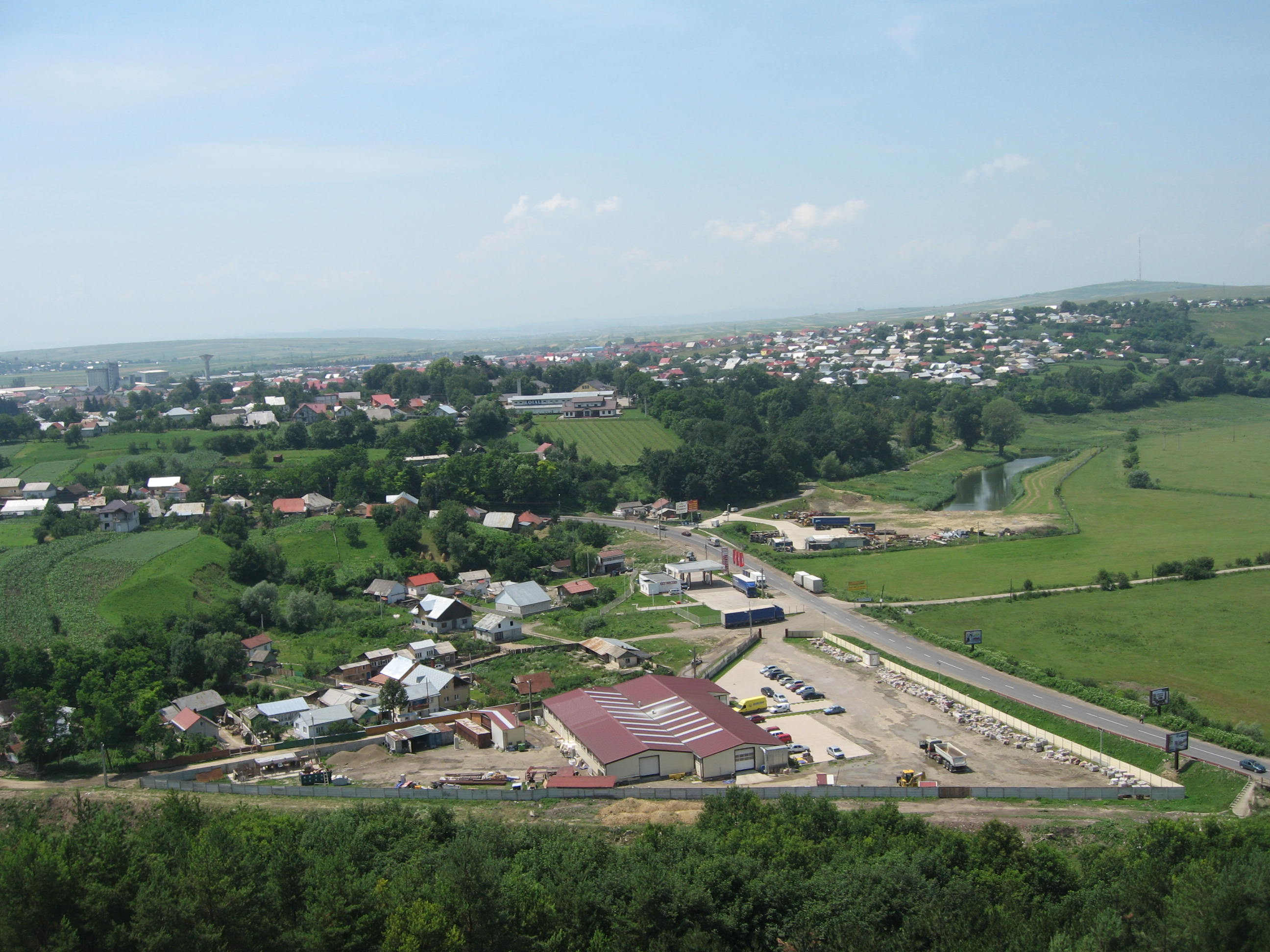
- Panoramic view of Șcheia, as seen from the ruins of the namesake medieval fortress

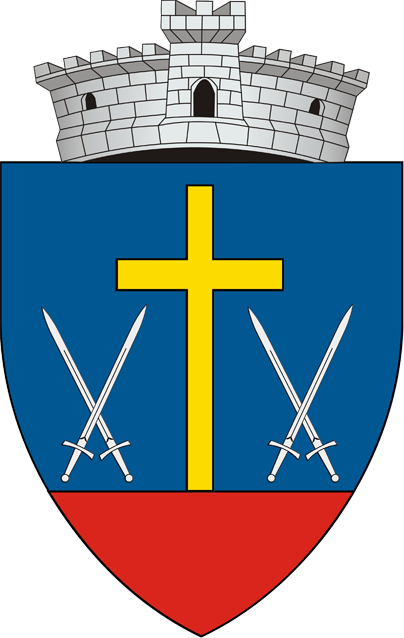
- Coat of arms

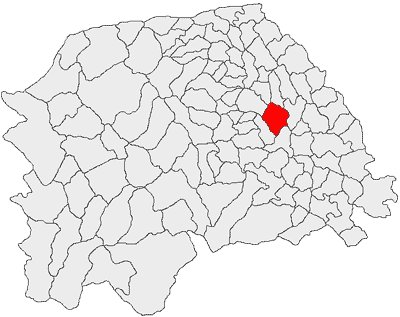
- Location in Suceava County

- Location in Romania
- Coordinates: 47°39′N 26°13′E
- Country: Romania
- County: Suceava

Government
  - Mayor (2020–2024): Vasile Andriciuc (PNL)
- Area: 58.3 km^{2} (22.5 sq mi)
- Elevation: 318 m (1,043 ft)
- Population (2021-12-01): 12,792
  - Density: 219/km^{2} (568/sq mi)
- Time zone: UTC+02:00 (EET)
  - Summer (DST): UTC+03:00 (EEST)
- Postal code: 727525
- Area code: +(40) 230
- Vehicle reg.: SV
- Website: www.primariascheia.ro

Șcheia (German: Skeja) is a commune located in Suceava County, Bukovina, northeastern Romania. It is composed of five villages: Florinta, Mihoveni, Sfântu Ilie, Șcheia, and Trei Movile.

== Politics and administration ==
The commune's current local council has the following multi-party political composition, based on the results of the ballots cast at the 2020 Romanian local elections:

Party	Seats	Current Council
National Liberal Party (PNL)	5	
Social Democratic Party (PSD)	5	
People's Movement Party (PMP)	4	
Save Romania Union (USR)	2	
PRO Romania (PRO)	1	

== Villages ==
=== Mihoveni ===
Archaeological research conducted at the Mihoveni-Cahla Morii archaeological site, beginning in the summer of 1971, led to the discovery of a multi-layered settlement whose existence began in prehistory and continued through the Middle Ages. Evidence of habitation dating from the Upper Paleolithic (Gravettian), Neolithic and Chalcolithic (Linear Pottery culture, Precucuteni III, Cucuteni B1 and B2 cultures), the transitional period to the Bronze Age (Komarov and Noua cultures), the Hallstatt period (Gáva-Holihrady culture, Grănicești cultural aspect), the Getic and Bastarnae La Tène, the 2nd–4th centuries AD, and the 13th–15th centuries has been identified.

The Mihoveni Cahla Morii archaeological site, located 2 km from the village, is listed as a historic monument by Romania's Ministry of Culture and Religious Affairs.

== Natives ==
- Neculai Nichitean (born 1969), former rugby union football player
- Vasile Tarnavschi (1859 – 1945), theologian

== Gallery ==
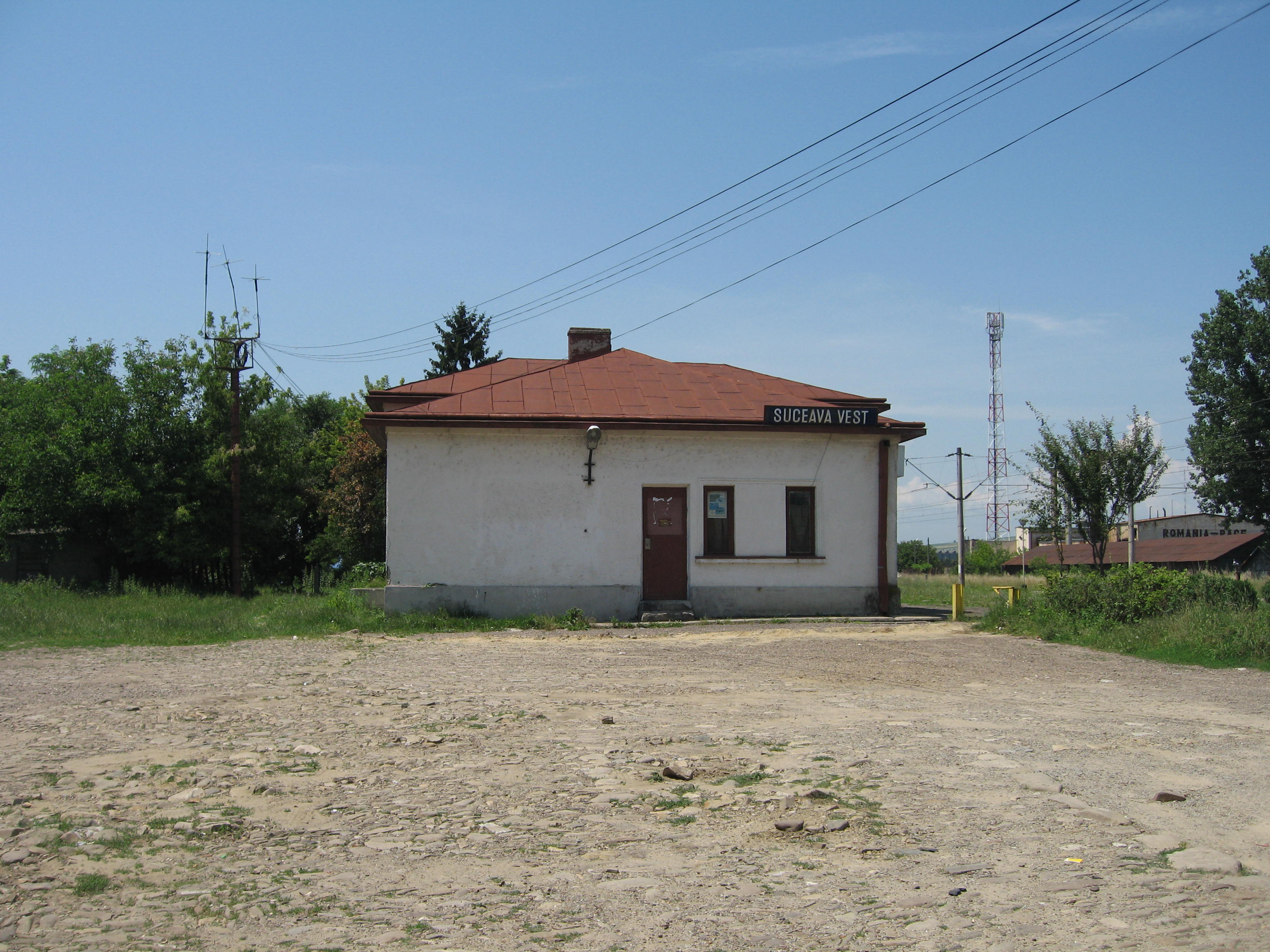
Suceava West train station in Șcheia

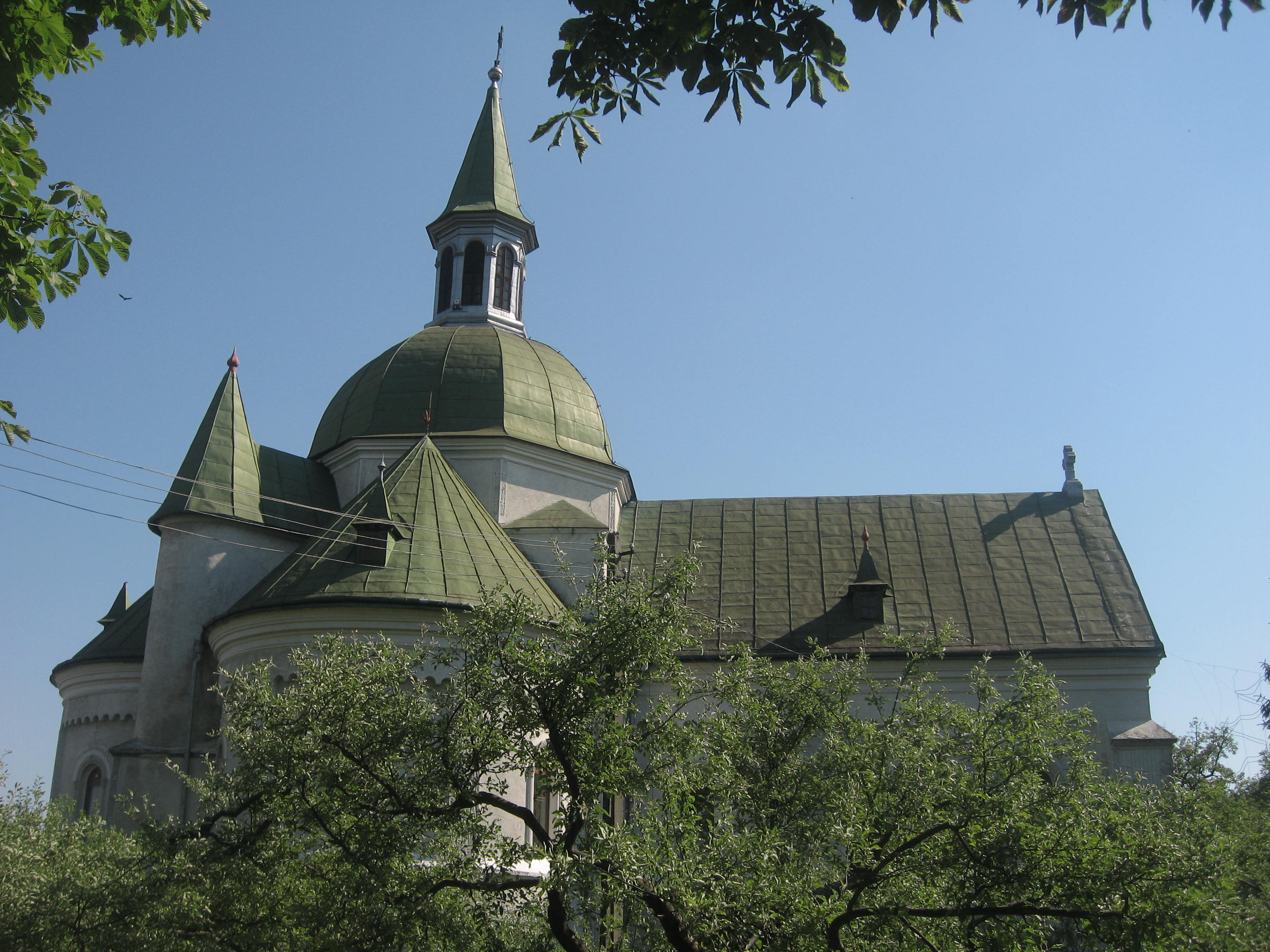
St. Michael and Gabriel Church in Mihoveni, Suceava County, Romania
