= Verkhni Petrivtsi =

Commune in Chernivtsi Oblast, Ukraine

Coordinates: 48.0706°N 25.6958°E

Verkhni Petrivtsi (Ukrainian: Верхні Петрівці; Romanian: Pătrăuții de Sus; German: Ober Petroutz) is a village in Chernivtsi Raion, Chernivtsi Oblast, Ukraine. It hosts the administration of Petrivtsi rural hromada, one of the hromadas of Ukraine.

Until 18 July 2020, Verkhni Petrivtsi belonged to Storozhynets Raion. The raion was abolished in July 2020 as part of the administrative reform of Ukraine, which reduced the number of raions of Chernivtsi Oblast to three. The area of Storozhynets Raion was merged into Chernivtsi Raion. In 2001, 94.91% of the inhabitants spoke Romanian as their native language, while 4.32% spoke Ukrainian.
