= Mihalcea =

Mihalcea is a Romanian surname. Notable people with the surname include:

- Adrian Mihalcea (born 1976), Romanian football player and manager
- Camelia Macoviciuc-Mihalcea (born 1968), Romanian rower

== See also ==
- The Romanian name for Mykhalcha Commune, Storozhynets Raion, Ukraine
