= Stari Broskivtsi =

Commune in Chernivtsi Oblast, Ukraine

Coordinates: 48.2400°N 25.7419°E

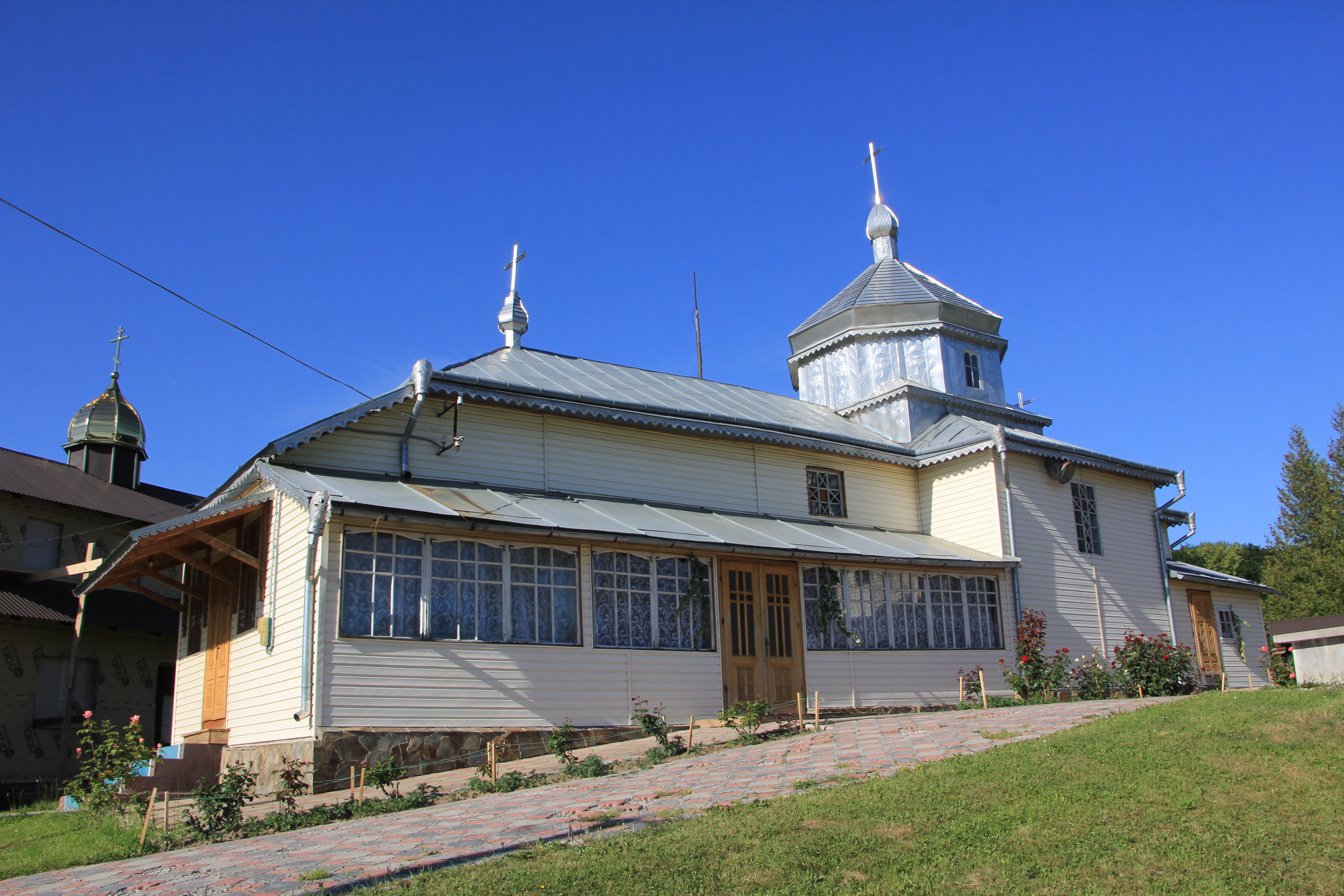
Wooden church of St. Ap. Peter and Paul, est. 1919 in Stari Broskivtsi.

Stari Broskivtsi (Ukrainian: Старі Бросківці; Romanian: Broscăuții Vechi; German: Broschkoutz Alt) is a commune (selsoviet) in Chernivtsi Raion, Chernivtsi Oblast, Ukraine. It is composed of a single village, Stari Broskivtsi. It belongs to Kamiana rural hromada, one of the hromadas of Ukraine.

Until 18 July 2020, Stari Broskivtsi belonged to Storozhynets Raion. The raion was abolished in July 2020 as part of the administrative reform of Ukraine, which reduced the number of raions of Chernivtsi Oblast to three. The area of Storozhynets Raion was merged into Chernivtsi Raion.
