= Kamiana =

Commune in Chernivtsi Oblast, Ukraine

Coordinates: 48.2231°N 25.8553°E

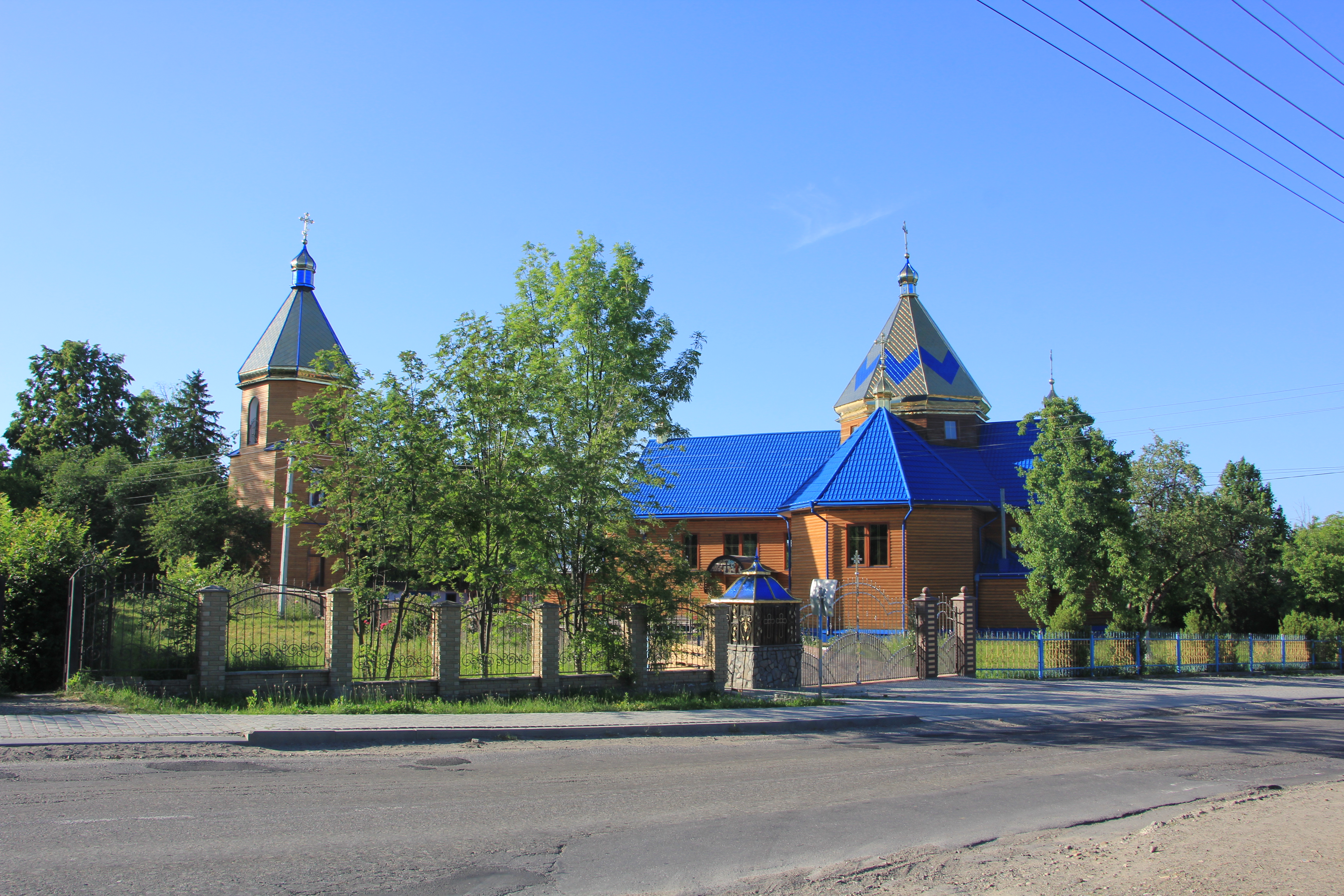

Kamiana (Ukrainian: Кам'яна; Romanian: Camena; German: Kamena) is a commune (selsoviet) in Chernivtsi Raion, Chernivtsi Oblast, Ukraine. It is composed of a single village, Kamiana. It hosts the administration of Kamiana rural hromada, one of the hromadas of Ukraine.

Until 18 July 2020, Kamiana belonged to Storozhynets Raion. The raion was abolished in July 2020 as part of the administrative reform of Ukraine, which reduced the number of raions of Chernivtsi Oblast to three. The area of Storozhynets Raion was merged into Chernivtsi Raion.
