= Neculai Nichitean =

Romania international rugby union player

- Born: Neculai Nichitean; 27 September 1969 (age 57) Șcheia, Romania
- Height: 5 ft 11 in (180 cm)
- Weight: 187 lb (85 kg)
- Occupation: Rugby Coach

Rugby union career
- Position: Fly-half
Youth career
- Bucovina Suceava
Senior career
| Years | Team | Apps | (Points) |
| 1986–1989 | Bucovina Suceava | | |
| 1989–1993 | Baia Mare | | |
| 1993–1997 | Universitatea Cluj | | |
| 1997–1999 | Mirano Rugby 1957 | | |
| 1999–2003 | Rugby Bologna | | |
| 2003–2006 | Modena Rugby Club | | |
International career
| Years | Team | Apps | (Points) |
| 1990–1997 | Romania | 28 | (201) |
Coaching career
- Years: Team
- 2011–2012: Universitatea Cluj

Neculai Nichitean (born 27 September 1969) in Șcheia, is a former Romanian rugby union football player and currently a coach. He played as a fly-half.

== Club career ==
Nichitean played for Suceava, Baia Mare, Universitatea Cluj and also for Mirano, Bologna and Modena in Italy. After retiring from playing he coached Romanian rugby club Universitatea Cluj.

== International career ==
Nichitean gathered 28 caps for Romania, from his debut in 1990 to his last game in 1997. He scored 45 penalties and 18 conversions during his international career, 201 points on aggregate. He was a member of his national side for the 2nd and 3rd Rugby World Cups in 1991 and 1995 and played in 4 group matches.
