= Mircea Streinul =

Romanian writer

Mircea Streinul (2 January 1910 – 17 April 1945) was an Austro-Hungarian-born Romanian prose writer and poet.

== Biography ==
Born in Cuciurul Mare, in the Bukovina region, his parents were the Romanian Orthodox priest Gavril Streinul and his wife Olimpia (née Șandru). He attended primary school in his native village. From 1920 to 1928, he studied at Aron Pumnul High School in Cernăuți, the capital of the region, which had meanwhile become part of Romania. While there, he was a member of the Steluța cultural society and managed the school magazine, Ecoul tinerimii. With three classmates, he published the single number of Caietul celor patru magazine. In 1929, he entered the theology faculty of Cernăuți University, graduating in 1934. While a student, he contributed to the local publications Tribuna, Spectatorul, Munca intelectuală, Evenimentul, Glasul Bucovinei and Junimea literară.

In 1931, he and four colleagues founded the Iconar group; together with I. Vesper, he established a publishing house with the same name that put out some 30 volumes of poetry in 1933–1934. The mission of the press and the magazine (also called Iconar) was to promote Bukovina's new literature, a synthesis of tradition and modernity. In 1935, he became ill with tuberculosis. From 1937 to 1938, he lived in the national capital Bucharest, where he edited the Iron Guard-affiliated newspaper Buna Vestire. Back at Cernăuți from 1938 to 1940, he led Suceava newspaper, was press adviser for Ținutul Suceava and vice president of the Bukovina Writers' Society. In 1940, he was a clerk in the Propaganda Ministry. As his disease worsened, he was obliged to stay at Filantropia Hospital and, from 1944, at the Filaret Sanatorium; he died the following April.

== Contributions ==
His first book, Carte de iconar (1933), included poems; this was followed by other short verse collections: Itinerar cu anexe în vis (1934), Tarot sau Călătoria omului (1935), Divertisment (1936), Zece cuvinte ale fericitului Francisc de Assisi (1936), Comentarii lirice la "Poeme într-un vers" de Ion Pillat (1937) and Corbul de aur (1938). In 1939, he collected the previous decade's work into Opera lirică. Shifting toward prose, he published the novella Aventura domnișoarei Zenobia Magheru (1938), followed by the novels Ion Aluion (1938, reissued in 1941 as Somnul negru), Lupul din țara Huțulilor (1939), Guzli sau Tsu-Tsui (1939), Viața în pădure (1939), Drama casei Timoteu (1941), Prăvălia diavolului (1942), Soarele răsare noaptea (1943) and Băieți de fată (1944).

His lyric verse was replete with myth, reflecting a pantheistic vision close to that of Lucian Blaga, but more obsessed with the oneiric, hallucinatory and obsessed with death, recording visions in a manner reminiscent of Rainer Maria Rilke and Georg Trakl. He translated from the latter as Cele patru poeme în proză ale austriacului Georg Trakl (1939). His early prose features sharply drawn evocations of rural life in Bukovina, evolving toward tragic depictions of fates determined by World War I and a Fyodor Dostoyevsky-like psychological analysis. In his later novels, Streinul added a fantastic-grotesque dimension.

He was a contributor to Capricorn, Azi, Frize, Meșterul Manole, Gândirea, Universul literar, Revista Fundațiilor Regale and Vremea. He authored an anthology, Poeți tineri bucovineni (1938), and a libretto for Paul Constantinescu's opera Meșterul Manole. He won the Romanian Writers' Society Prize in 1935.
