= Arcadie Ciupercovici =

Romanian Orthodox cleric

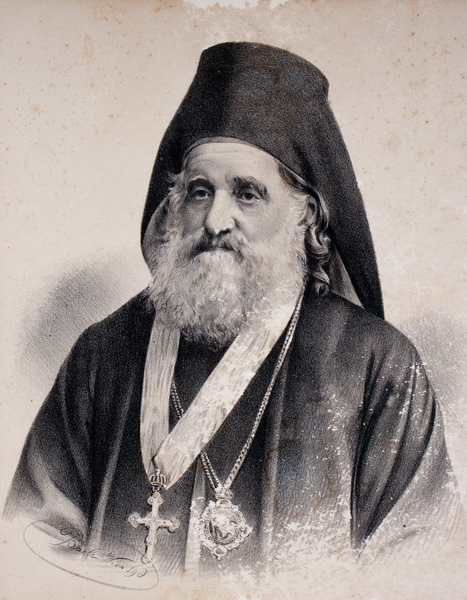

Arcadie Ciupercovici (born Alexandru Ciupercovici; April 14, 1823 [O.S.]–March 5, 1902) was an ethnic Romanian Orthodox cleric from the Duchy of Bukovina in Austria-Hungary.

Born in Câmpulung Moldovenesc, his father Nicolae Ciupercă was a priest there. He attended gymnasium and the theological institute in Cernăuți, graduating in 1847, when he was ordained a priest. He served at Toporăuți (1847), Cernăuca (1848-1853), Bădeuți and Milișăuți (until 1866). That year, his wife Olimpia (née Tomiuk) died; the couple had two daughters, one of whom died young. He then entered Putna Monastery as a monk, taking the name Arcadie. Living there until 1878, he soon became hegumen, rising to archimandrite in 1874. In 1871, during his time at Putna, the first congress of Romanian students took place there. In 1873, he was part of the delegation that went to Vienna in order to ask autonomy for the Romanian Orthodox Church. From 1878 to 1880, he was an adviser to the metropolitan bishop, and was diocesan archimandrite and vicar general under Silvestru Morariu-Andrievici.

He served as Metropolitan of Bukovina and Dalmatia from 1896 until his death in Cernăuți. Perceived official injustice toward the Romanian community increased during his term; for example, in 1899, the authorities decided that one of the church's two representatives in the provincial school council had to be Ruthenian. The trend continued after his death: from 1905, five of ten advisers to the metropolitan had to be Ruthenian, the other half Romanian. He served in the Diet of Bukovina from 1874 to 1878, and again from 1896 to 1902. He was in the House of Deputies in Vienna from 1885 to 1891, joining the Austrian House of Lords in 1896.
