= Chudei =

Village in Chernivtsi Oblast, Ukraine

Coordinates: 48.0483°N 25.5889°E

Chudei (Ukrainian: Чудей, romanized: Chudey; Romanian: Ciudei; Yiddish: טשעדי, romanized: Tshedi; German: Tschudej) is a village in Chernivtsi Raion, Chernivtsi Oblast, Ukraine. It hosts the administration of Chudei rural hromada, one of the hromadas of Ukraine.

Between September 7, 1946 and April 6, 1995 the village was called Meschyritschja (Ukrainian: Межиріччя).

Until 18 July 2020, Chudei belonged to Storozhynets Raion. The raion was abolished in July 2020 as part of the administrative reform of Ukraine, which reduced the number of raions of Chernivtsi Oblast to three. The area of Storozhynets Raion was merged into Chernivtsi Raion. In 2001, 82.24% of the inhabitants spoke Romanian as their native language, while 13.56% spoke Ukrainian.

In an interview for the Romanian newspaper Libertatea published on 26 April 2023, the mayor of the Chudei rural hromada, Anatolie Pițul, stated that some 60 men, ethnic Romanians, from the localities composing the hromada were fighting in the frontlines as a result of the Russian invasion of Ukraine. He also said that the Chudei rural hromada had hosted a total of some 1,250 internally displaced Ukrainian citizens since the start of the war, with some 340 remaining in the hromada at the time of the interview's publication.

== Notable people ==
- Mikhail Burla (born 1957), Transnistrian politician
- Maria Rusescu (born 1936), Romanian painter
