= Rusyns in Romania =

Total population
- 262 (2002 census); 834 (2021 census)

Regions with significant populations
- Romania (Maramureș)

Languages
- Rusyn (native), Romanian, Ukrainian

Religion
- Mainly Eastern Orthodox Christianity

Related ethnic groups
- Other Rusyns, Ukrainians of Romania

The Rusyns (Rusyn: Русины, romanized: Rusynŷ, Romanian: Ruteni) are an ethnic minority in Romania.

While only 262 people officially identified themselves as "Rusyns" in the 2002 Romanian census, 3,890 people identified as Hutsuls (Romanian: Huțuli; Rusyn Hutsuly). According to the 2021 Romanian census, there were 834 people (0.004% of the population) who identified themselves officially as Rusyns, and 594 who declared that their language was Rusyn. Among the self-declared Rusyns, 179 declared that they spoke Romanian, 90 Ukrainian, 4 Russian, and 545 Rusyn. In the 2011 Romanian census, there were 257 self-identified Rusyns in Romania. According to the U.S. Census Bureau, in 2015, there were 345 ethnic Ukrainians born in Romania who lived in the United States of America at that time. According to the U.S. Census Bureau, in 2015, there were no ethnic Carpatho-Rusyns born in Romania who lived in the United States of America at that time among the 156 foreign-born Carpatho-Rusyns and the 8,003 Carpatho-Rusyns living in the United States. By contrast, according to the U.S. Census Bureau, in 2015, there were 345 ethnic Ukrainians born in Romania who lived in the United States of America at that time.

Another 61,091 Romanian citizens identified as Ukrainian (Romanian: Ucrainieni). According to the 2021 Romanian census, 45,835 individuals declared that they were ethnic Ukrainians (0.24%), and 40,861 declared their mother tongue as Ukrainian; among the ethnic Ukrainians, 39,326 stated that their mother tongue was Ukrainian, and 15 said that it was Rusyn. As the archaic exonym Ruthenians was previously applied to both Rusyns and Ukrainians, some Ukrainian-Romanians may also regard themselves as Rusyns (without declaring themselves to, or being identified by, census collectors). Ukrainian-Romanians live primarily in northwestern Romania; the largest populations are found in Satu Mare and Maramureș counties.

As an officially recognised ethnic minority, Rusyns have a reserved seat in the Romanian Chamber of Deputies, which is currently held by a party called the Cultural Union of Ruthenians of Romania. In 2020, the political group obtained 3,779 votes (0.06%), while the Union of Ukrainians of Romania obtained 5,457 votes (0.09%) in the Chamber of Deputies election.
