= Storozhynets Raion =

Former subdivision of Chernivtsi Oblast, Ukraine

Storozhynets Raion Сторожинецький район (in Ukrainian) Raionul Storojineţ (in Romanian)
- Raion
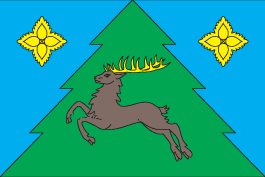
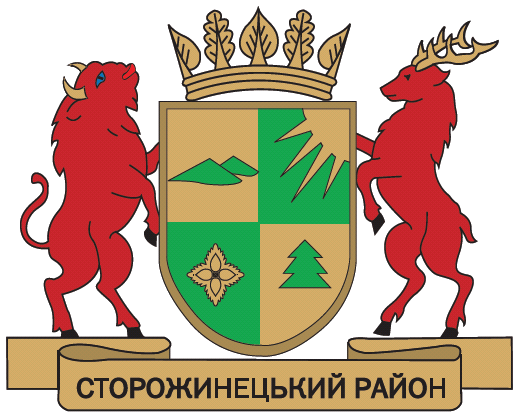
- Flag Coat of arms

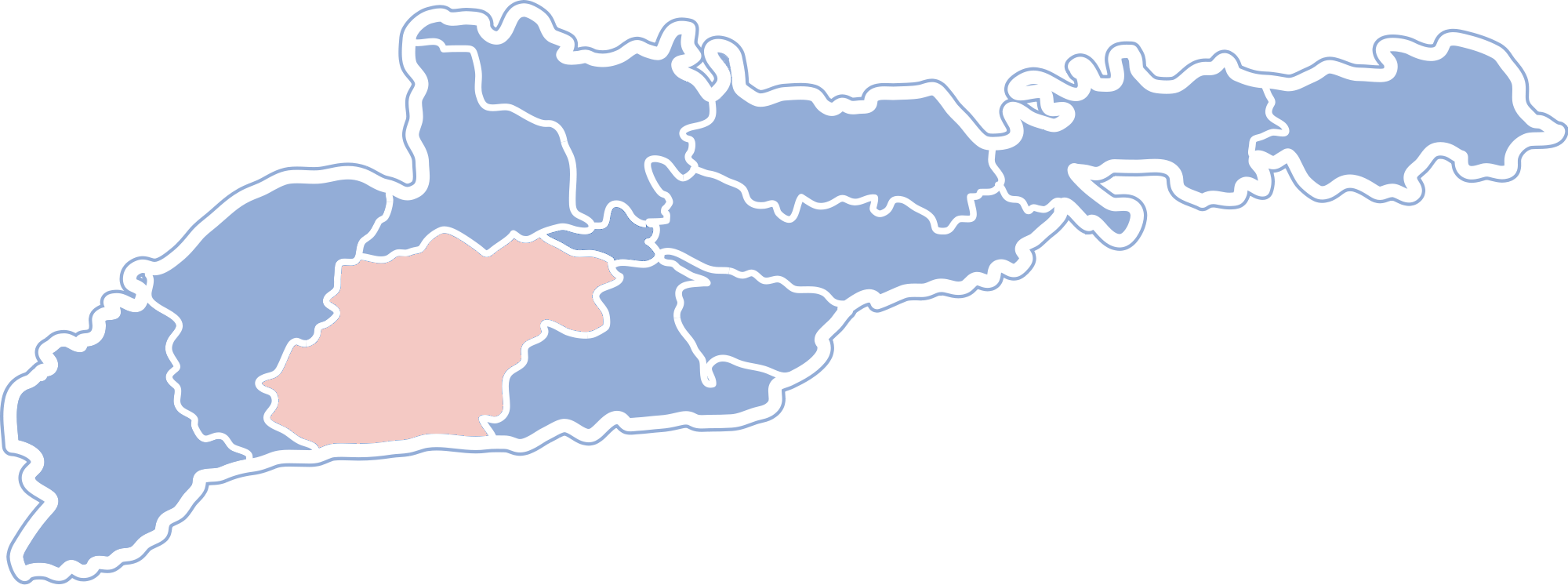
- Coordinates: 48°7′5″N 25°37′44″E
- Country: Ukraine
- Region: Chernivtsi Oblast
- Established: 1940
- Disestablished: 18 July 2020
- Admin. center: Storozhynets
- Subdivisions: List: — city councils; — settlement councils; — rural councils; Number of localities: — cities; — urban-type settlements; 37 — villages; — rural settlements

Government
  - Governor: N/A

Area
  - Total: 1,160 km^{2} (450 sq mi)

Population (2020)
  - Total: 100,918
  - Density: 87.0/km^{2} (225/sq mi)
- Time zone: UTC+02:00 (EET)
  - Summer (DST): UTC+03:00 (EEST)
- Postal index: 604XX
- Area code: 380-3735X
- Website: [?]

Storozhynets Raion (Ukrainian: Сторожинецький район, Romanian: Raionul Storojineț) was a raion (administrative district) in Chernivtsi Oblast, (province), in the historical region of Bukovina, in western part of Ukraine. The administrative center of the raion was the city of Storozhynets. It bordered with Romania from south, Vyzhnytsia Raion from west, Kitsman Raion from north, municipality of Chernivtsi and Hlyboka Raion from east. The raion was abolished on 18 July 2020 as part of the administrative reform of Ukraine, which reduced the number of raions of Chernivtsi Oblast to three. The area of Storozhynets Raion was merged into Chernivtsi Raion. The last estimate of the raion population was 100,918 (2020 est.)

At the time of disestablishment, the raion consisted of six hromadas:

- Chudei rural hromada with the administration in the selo of Chudei;
- Kamiana rural hromada with the administration in the selo of Kamiana;
- Krasnoilsk settlement hromada with the administration in the urban-type settlement of Krasnoilsk;
- Petrivtsi rural hromada with the administration in the selo of Verkhni Petrivtsi;
- Storozhynets urban hromada with the administration in Storozhynets;
- Velykyi Kuchuriv rural hromada with the administration in the selo of Velykyi Kuchuriv.

According to the 2001 Ukrainian Census, the raion's population was 95,295. The ethnic composition of the district's population as reported by the census: 56,786 Ukrainians (59.59%), 35,095 Romanians (36.83%), 1,367 Russians (1.43%), 307 Moldovans (0.32%), and 1,740 others (1.83%). Storozhynets Raion, within its boundaries at that time, had 95,295 inhabitants in 2001, including 61.42% Ukrainian-speakers, 35.64% Romanian-speakers, and 1.81% Russian-speakers. According to the last Soviet census of 1989, there were 89,751 inhabitants, including 51,526 Ukrainians (57.41%), 32,965 Romanians (36.73%), 731 Moldovans (0.88%), 2,310 Russians (2.57%) and 1,693 Poles (1.89%).

The Romanian population was concentrated in the south of the raion, especially around the urban-type settlement of Krasnoilsk (Romanian: Crasna). The raion had 1 city (Storozhynets), 1 urban-type settlement (Krasnoilsk), which on 26 January 2024 became a rural settlement, 24 communes (selsoviets), and 13 villages attached to communes. These villages were

- Banyliv Pidhirnyi (Romanian: Bănila pe Siret, Bănila Moldovenească between 1922 and 1944, German: Augustendorf)
- Bobivtsi (Romanian: Bobești)
- Novi Broskivtsi (Romanian: Broscăuții Noi, German: Broschkoutz Neu)
- Stari Broskivtsi (Romanian: Broscăuții Vechi, German: Broschkoutz Alt)
- Budenets (Romanian: Budineț, German: Budinetz, has Romanian majority)
- Kamiana (Romanian: Camena, German: Kamena)
- Cheresh (Cireș, German: Cziresz, has Romanian majority)
- Chudei (Romanian: Ciudei, German: Czudyn, Mezhirechye between 1944 and 1995, has Romanian majority)
- Komarivtsi (Romanian: Comărești)
- Kostyntsi (Romanian: Costești, German: Kostestie)
- Stara Krasnoshora (Romanian: Crăsnișoara Veche, Polish: Stara Huta Krasna, German: Althütte, former Ukrainian: Altkhyute between 1775 and 1918, has Polish majority)
- Velykyi Kuchuriv (Romanian: Cuciurul Mare, Romanian: Kuczurmare, Polish: Kuczurów Wielki)
- Davydivka (Romanian: Davideni, German: Dawideny)
- Yizhivtsi (Romanian: Igești, German: Idzestie, has Romanian majority)
- Stara Zhadova (Romanian: Jadova, German: Zadowa Alt)
- Mykhalcha (Romanian: Mihalcea, German: Mihalcze)
- Panka (Romanian: Panca, German: Panka)
- Nyzhni Petrivtsi (Romanian: Pătrăuții de Jos, German: Unter Petroutz, Polish: Pietrowce Dolne, has Romanian majority)
- Verkhni Petrivtsi (Romanian: Pătrăuții de Sus, German: Ober Petroutz, has Romanian majority)
- Ropcha (Romanian: Ropcea, has Romanian majority)
- Sloboda-Komarivtsi (Romanian: Slobozia Comăreștilor, German: Komarestie Slobodzia)
- Sniachiv (Romanian: Sneci, Polish: Sniacziw)
- Tysovets (Romanian: Tișăuți, German: Teschoutz)
- Zrub-Komarivskyi (Romanian: Trei Movile)
- Arshytsia (Romanian: Arșița, has Romanian majority)
- Kabivtsi (Romanian: Căbești, German: Kabestie)
- Kosovanka (Romanian: Cosovanca)
- Nova Kranoshora (Romanian: Crăsnișoara Nouă, German: Neuhütte, has Romanian majority)
- Dubove (Romanian: Dubova)
- Dibrivka (Romanian: Dumbrava)
- Hlybochok (Romanian: Hlibacioc)
- Hodyliv (Romanian: Hodilău)
- Nova Zhadova (Romanian: Jadova Nouă, German: Zadowa Alt)
- Spaska (Romanian: Spasca)
- Ursoia (Romanian: Ursoaia, Usole between 1944 and 1995, has Romanian majority)
- Zabolottia (Romanian: Zabolotie, Yablonovets between 1944 and 1995)
- Zavoloka (Romanian: Zavoloca)
