= Selyshche, Dniester Raion, Chernivtsi Oblast =

Commune in Chernivtsi Oblast, Ukraine

Selyshche Селище
- Village
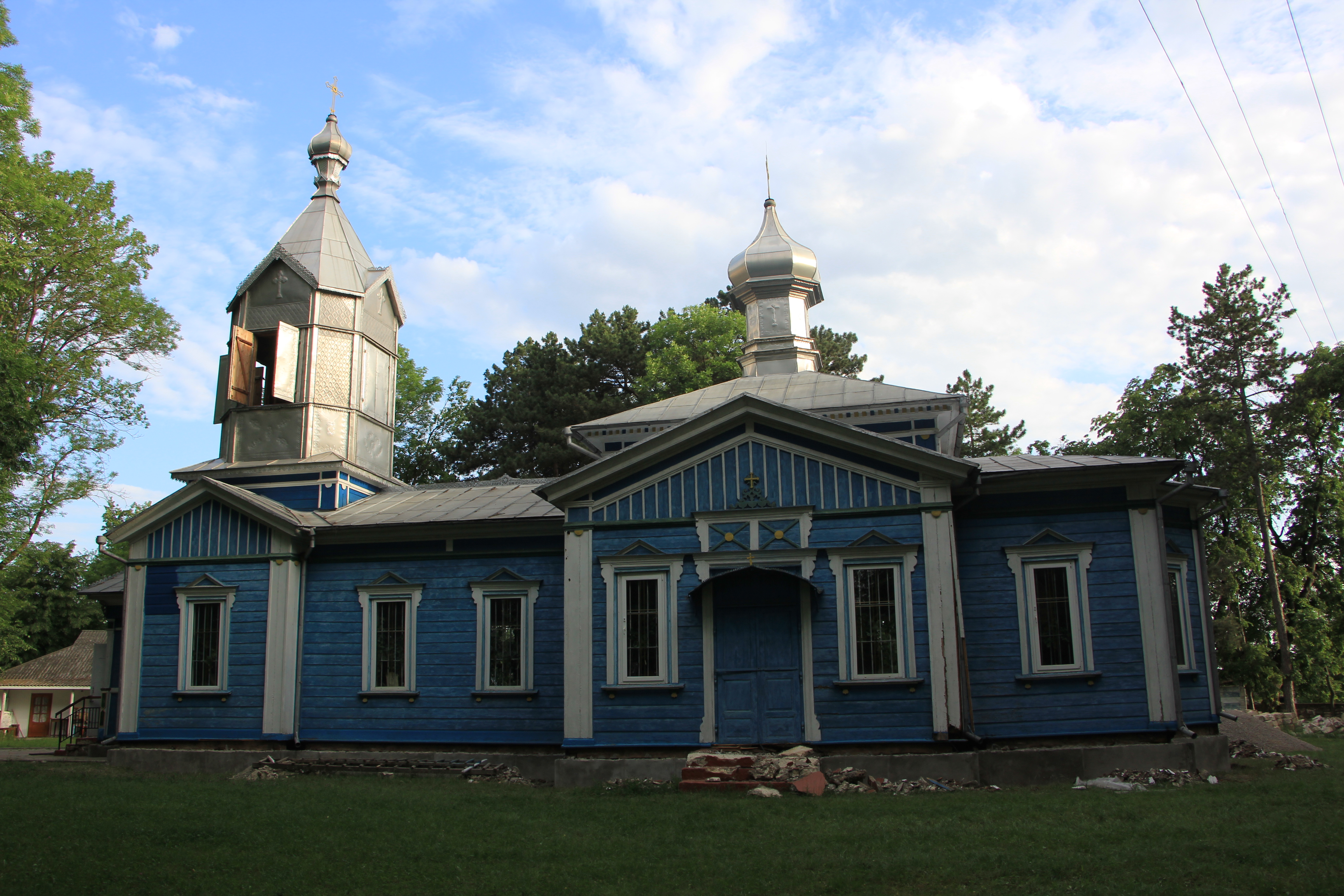
- Church of the Intercession Pr. Mother of God 1888 p. Village

- Location within Chernivtsi Oblast Location within Ukraine
- Coordinates: 48°29′53″N 27°5′18″E
- Country: Ukraine
- Oblast: Chernivtsi Oblast
- Raion: Dniester Raion
- Hromada: Sokyriany urban hromada
- Founded: before 1808
- Elevation: 259 m (850 ft)

Population (2001)
  - Total: 1,375
- Time zone: UTC+2 (EET)
  - Summer (DST): UTC+3 (EEST)
- Postal code: 60216
- Website: Village

Selyshche (Ukrainian: Селище) is a village in western Ukraine, in Dniester Raion of Chernivtsi Oblast. It belongs to Sokyriany urban hromada, one of the hromadas of Ukraine.

According to the 2001 Ukrainian census, 1,375 people live in the village.

== History ==
According to the data of 1859, 1898 people (946 males and 952 females) lived in the proprietary village Khotyn district Bessarabian province 1898 people (946 males and 952 females), there were 343 households, and there was an Orthodox Church.

As of 1886, the village had 2271 people, 381 households, an Orthodox church and a school.

Since August 24, 1991, the village has been part of independent Ukraine.

Until 18 July 2020, Selyshche belonged to Sokyriany Raion. The raion was abolished in July 2020 as part of the administrative reform of Ukraine, which reduced the number of raions of Chernivtsi Oblast to three. The area of Sokyriany Raion was merged into Dniester Raion.

== Gallery ==
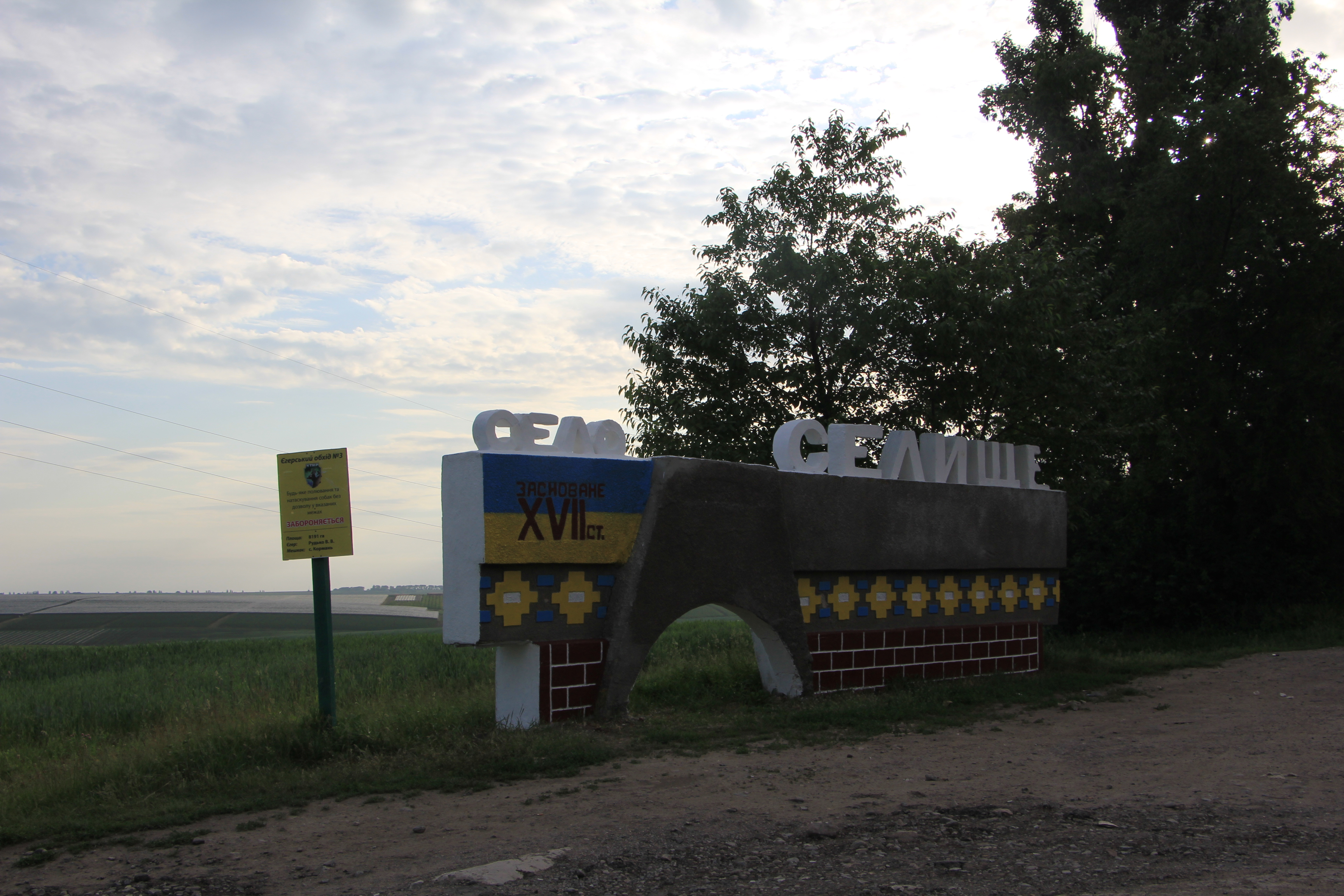
Sign at the entrance to the village

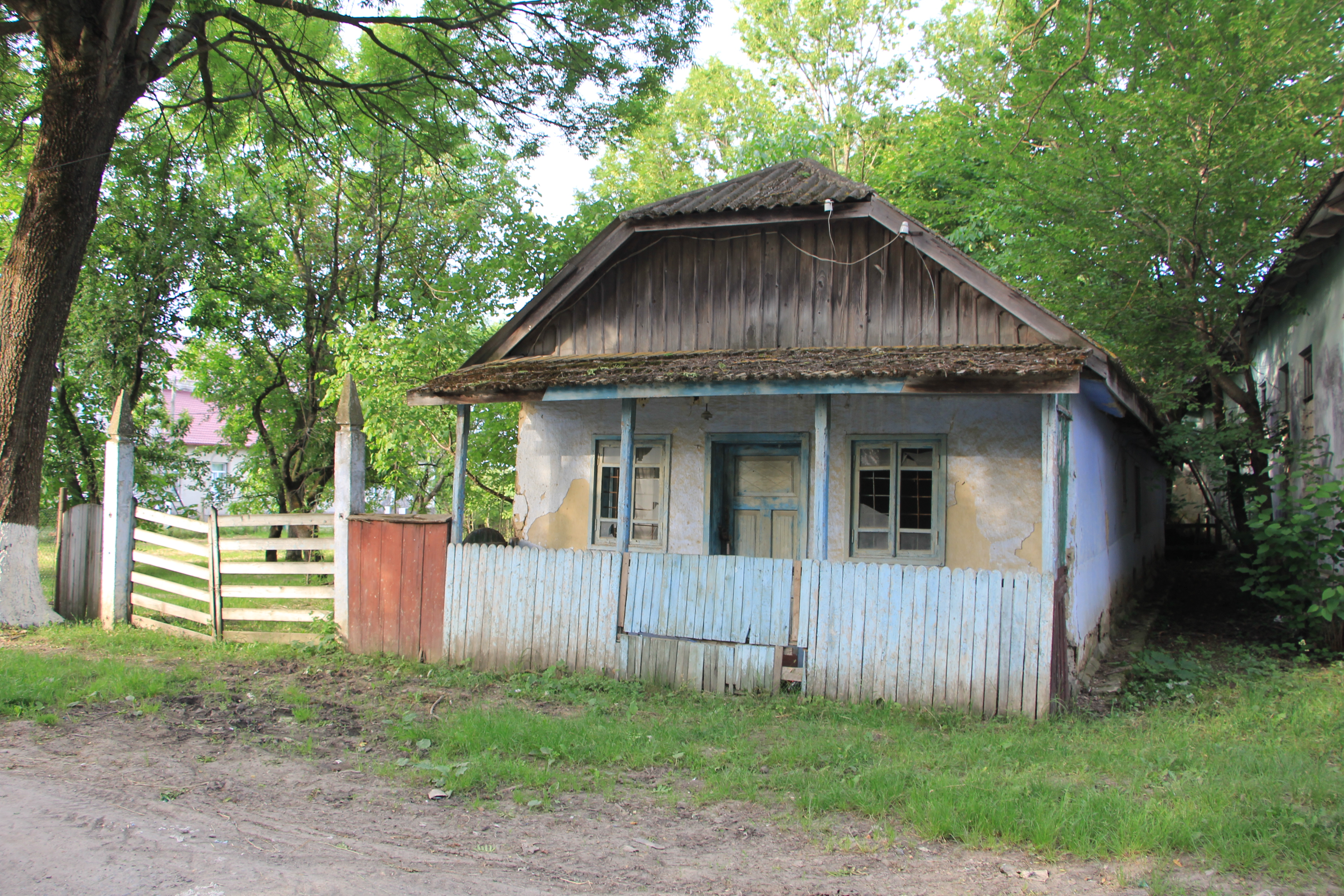
An old house

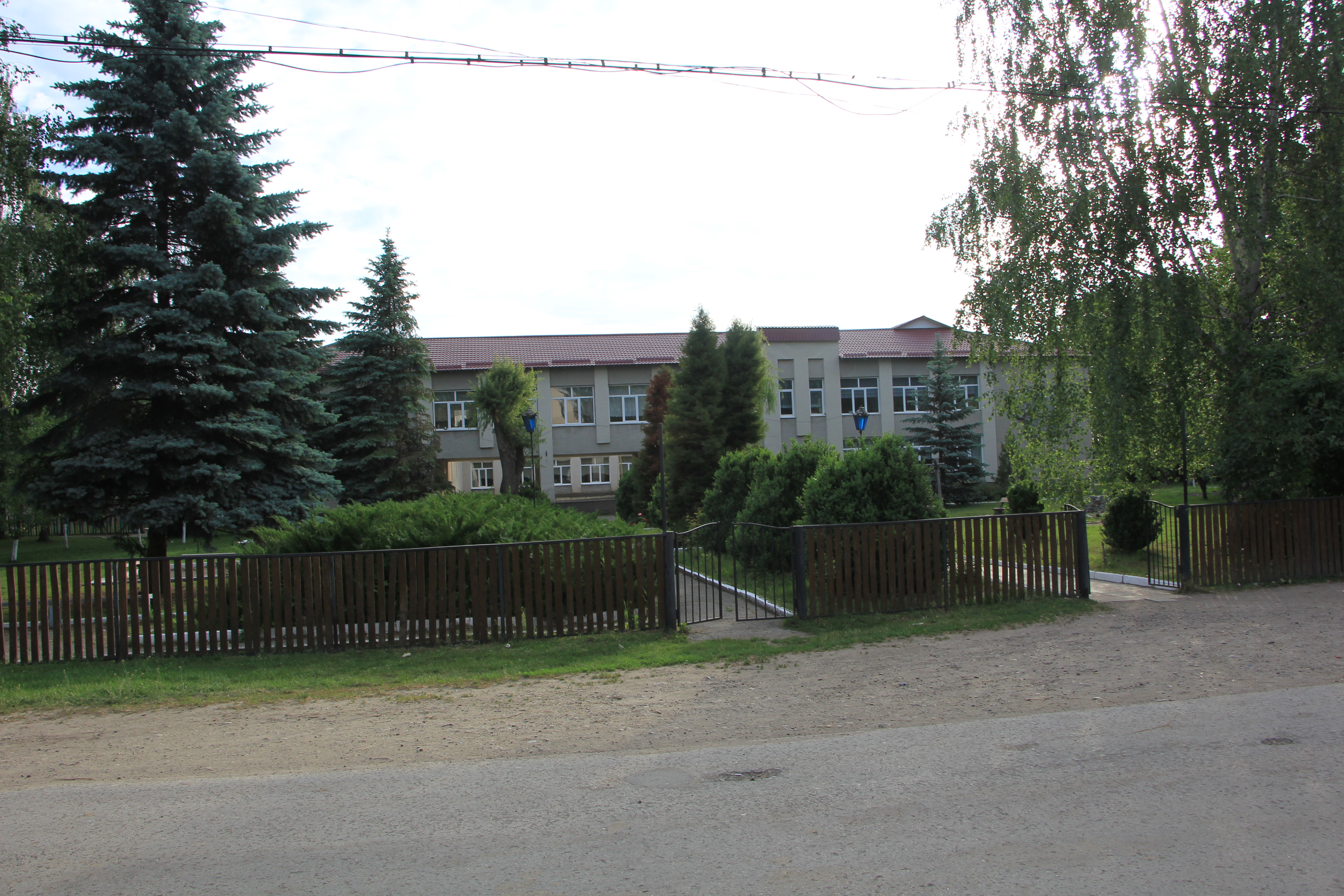
School

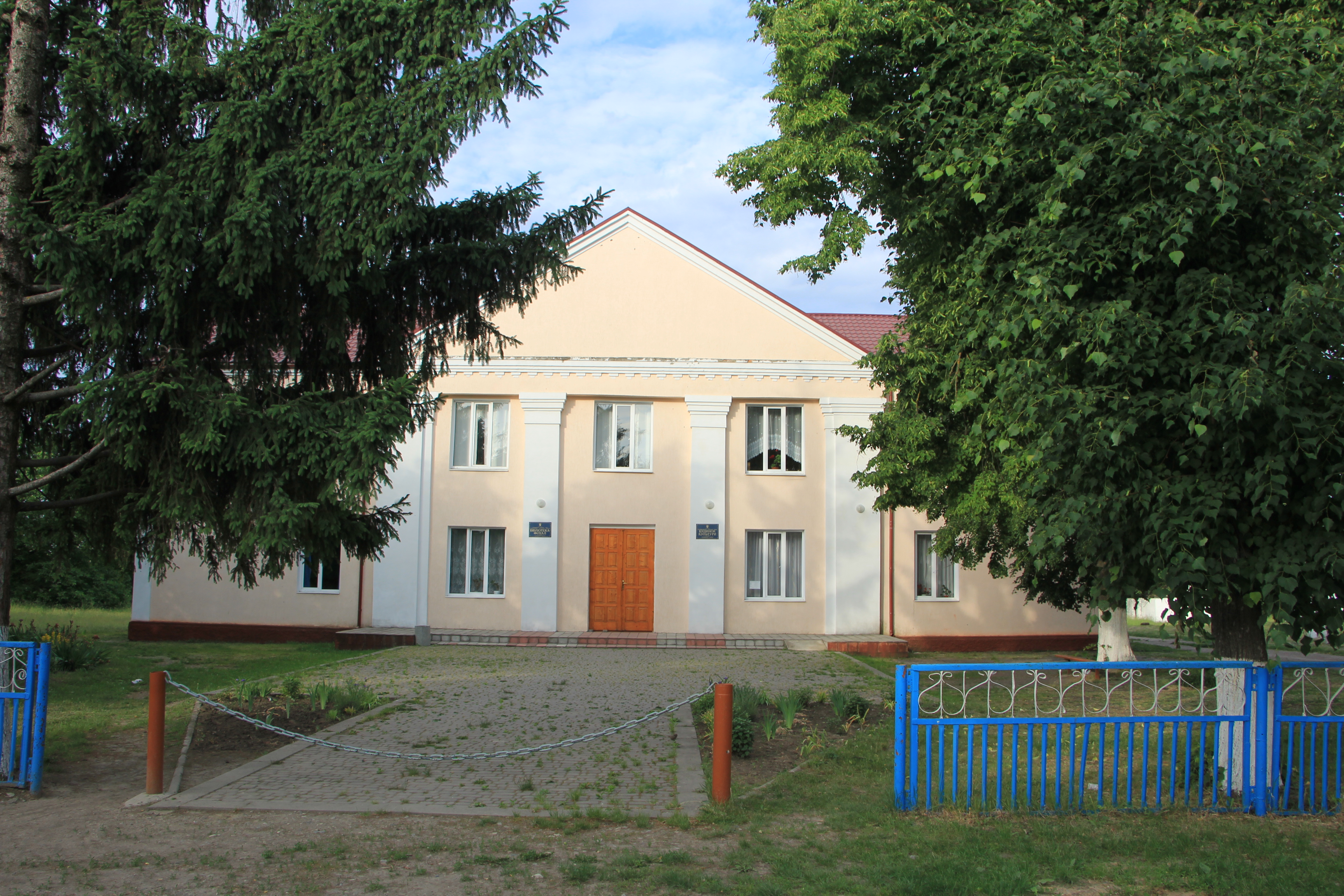
House of culture

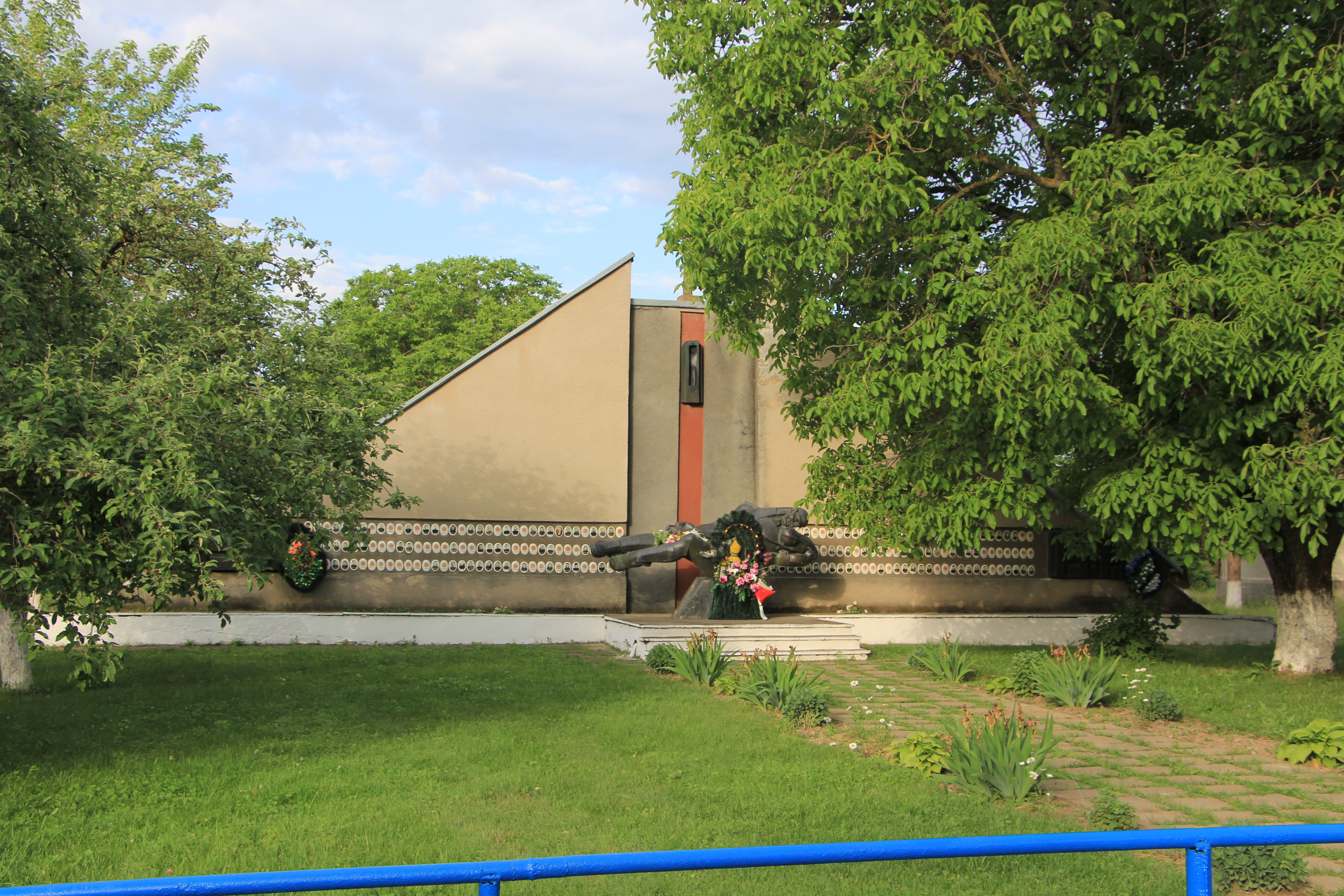
Soviet monument

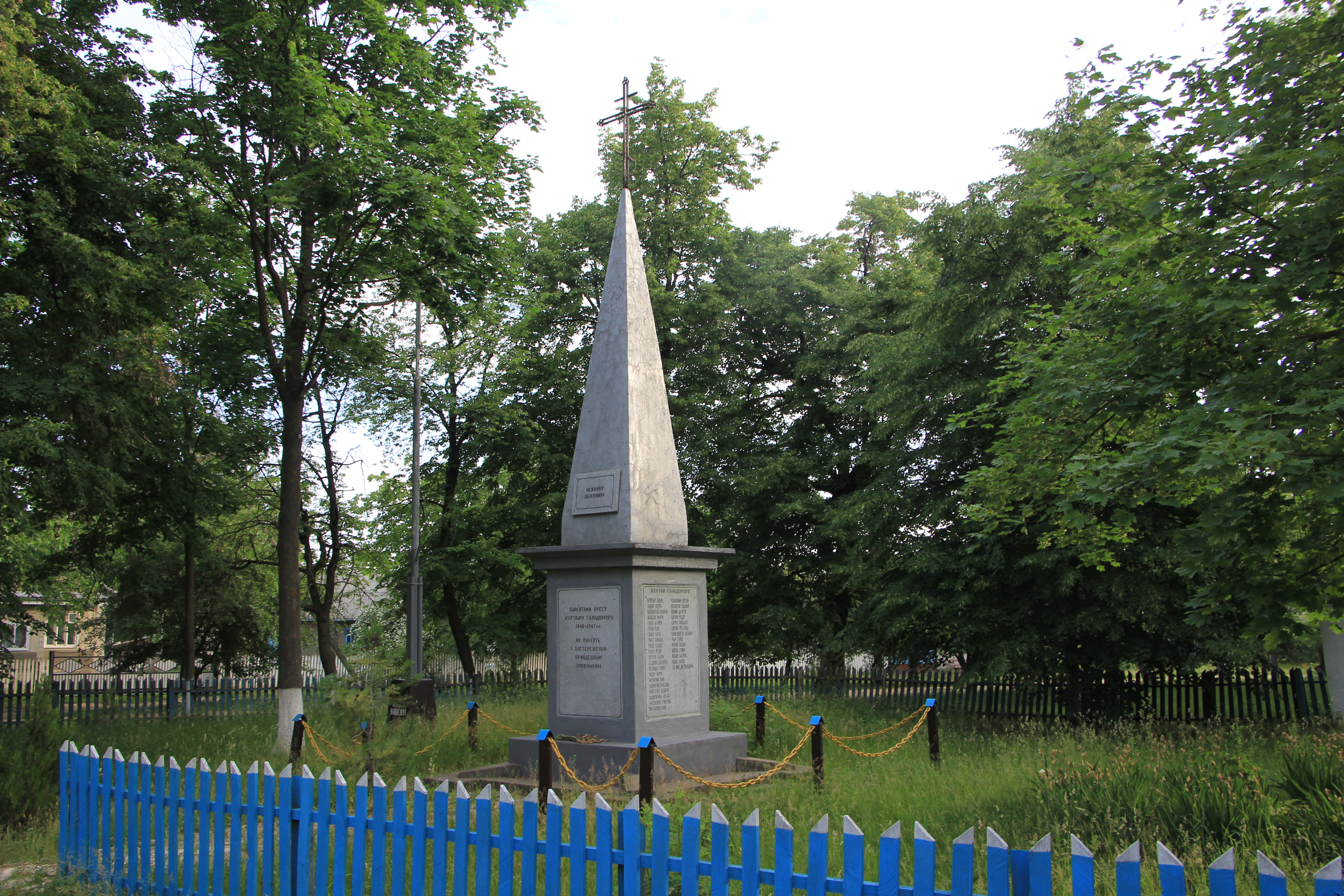
Soviet monument
