= Alfred Rusescu =

Romanian pediatrician (1895–1981)

Alfred Rusescu (April 12, 1895–October 9, 1981) was a Romanian pediatrician.

Born in Bucharest into a family of intellectuals, he attended Gheorghe Lazăr High School. In 1913, Rusescu entered the Medicine faculty of the University of Bucharest. Following graduation, he studied medicine at the University of Paris from 1920 to 1925. His thesis dealt with the development of waistlines in infants. From 1922 to 1926, he was an intern at Notre-Dame de Bon Secours Hospital in Paris, under the noted pediatrician Gaston Variot.

After returning home, in 1927 Rusescu was hired as an instructor at the University of Bucharest's pediatrics department headed by Mihail Manicatide. In 1931, he briefly served as assistant professor, rising to associate professor later that year. In 1940, he was made full professor and head of department. He played an important role in the founding of a separate pediatrics faculty, raising the prestige of the discipline. Rusescu assiduously encouraged the most promising students, so that nearly all the new maternity hospitals established in Bucharest by the communist regime after 1948 were headed by his former students.

Rusescu authored over 400 scientific publications, individually and in collaboration, which appeared in magazines, books and textbooks. In 1967, he was awarded the Romanian Academy's Gheorghe Marinescu prize. He was an honorary member of the Academy of Medical Sciences. In 1942, he launched Revista de Pediatrie, a magazine where he published a series of studies based on his clinical work. As head of the Bucharest Pediatrics Society, he drew together local specialists in the field.

In 1990, one of Bucharest's maternity hospitals was named after Rusescu.
