= Maria Rusescu =

Romanian painter (born 1936)

- Born: 7 September 1936; Ciudei, Storojineţ County, Romania (now Chudei, Chernivtsi Oblast, Ukraine)
- Known for: Painting

Maria Rusescu (born 7 September 1936) is a Romanian painter.

== Biography ==
=== Early life ===
Rusescu's parents, Filaret and Zamfira Andrișan, moved to Iași from Northern Bukovina at the beginning of 1940. After graduating in 1959 from Institutul Politehnic Iași, Maria Rusescu was a textile engineer who worked for SC IAȘICOMF SA Iași, from where she retired in 1990.

=== Artistic career ===
Rusescu's first paintings, dated 1974, are reproductions, in particular, after the work of Theodor Aman. Later, she became fascinated by the work of artist Constantin Daniel Stahi, whom she considered a spiritual mentor. As a result, Rusescu established the "Constantin Daniel Stahi" Foundation in 1993 in Iași, coordinating its activities until 2007. After 1990 she participated in several local and national (Romanian) exhibitions.

Influenced by the works of Stahi, Rusescu's paintings oscillate between a native sincerity and the attempt to accurately represent, in a classical manner, religious objects or peasant traditional subjects enveloped in a particular light, creating the appearance of a world long gone where everything contained perfection and equilibrium.

=== Recognition ===
- 1990: Diploma de gradul I, Group exhibition, Alley of Classics, Chișinău, Moldova, 3rd Prize at Annual Salon of the Asociația Artiștilor Plastici from Iași.
- 1994: 3rd Prize, "Arthur Verona" Artists Exhibition, Minerva Gallery, Dorohoi.
- 2000: 2nd Prize for the painting "Mama" (The Mother) at the Asociația Artiștilor Plastici Iași Spring Salon.
- 2003: 3rd Prize for the painting "Moara, gîștele și noi" (The mill, the geese, and us) at the Asociaţia Artiştilor Plastici Iași Spring Salon, "Casa Cărții" Gallery, Iași.
