= Sniachiv =

Village in Chernivtsi Oblast, Ukraine

Sniachiv Снячів
- Village
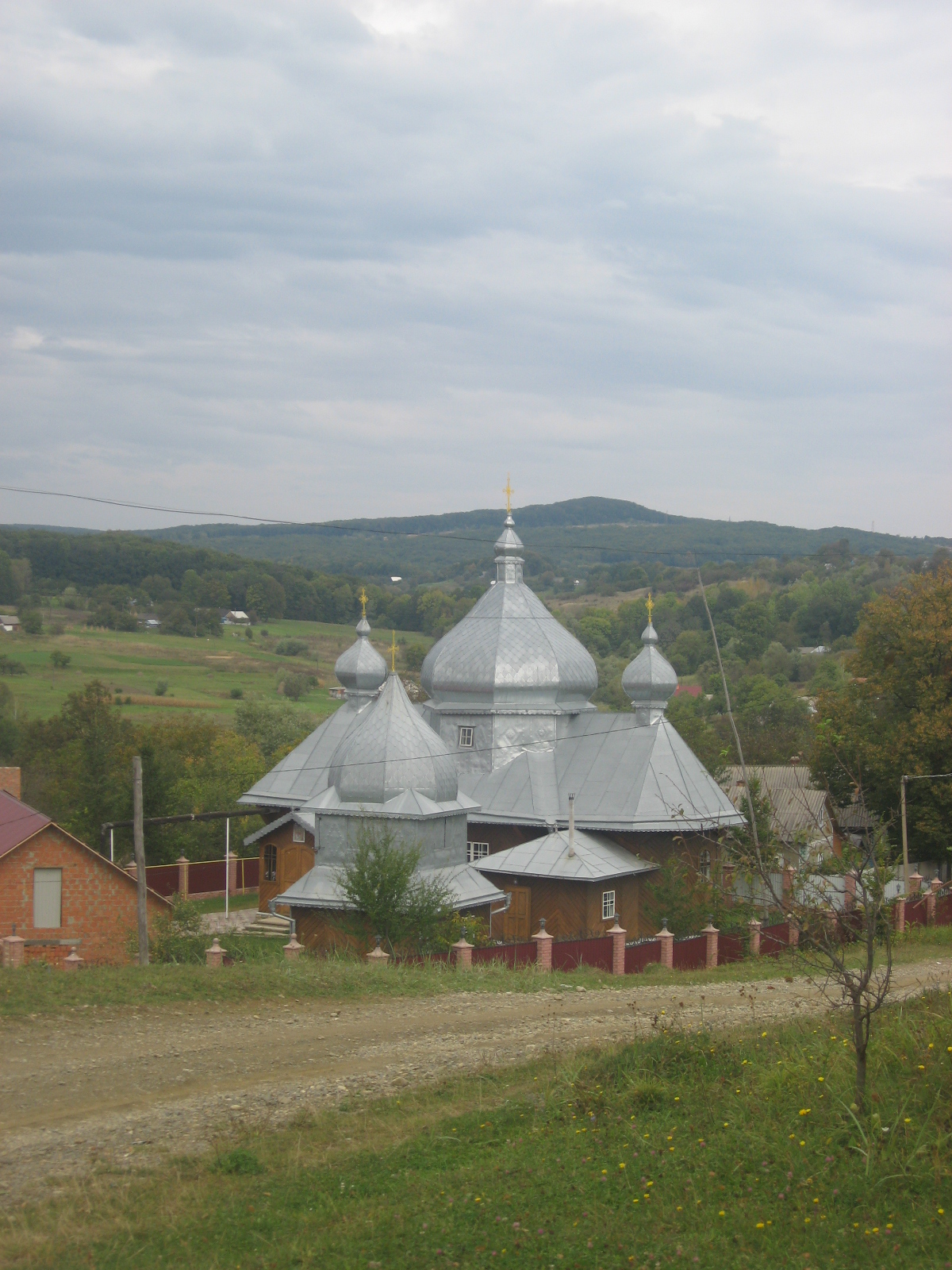
- Holy Spirit Church

- Location within Ukraine
- Coordinates: 48.1889°N 25.8411°E
- Country: Ukraine
- Oblast: Chernivtsi Oblast
- Raions of Ukraine: Chernivtsi Raion
- Hromada: Velykyi Kuchuriv rural hromada

Sniachiv (Ukrainian: Снячів; Romanian: Sneci) is a village in Chernivtsi Raion, Chernivtsi Oblast, Ukraine. It belongs to Velykyi Kuchuriv rural hromada, one of the hromadas of Ukraine.

Until 18 July 2020, Sniachiv belonged to Storozhynets Raion. The raion was abolished in July 2020 as part of the administrative reform of Ukraine, which reduced the number of raions of Chernivtsi Oblast to three. The area of Storozhynets Raion was merged into Chernivtsi Raion.
