= Panka, Ukraine =

Commune in Chernivtsi Oblast, Ukraine

Coordinates: 48.1733°N 25.6481°E

Panka (Ukrainian: Панка; Romanian: Panca) is a village in Chernivtsi Raion, Chernivtsi Oblast, Ukraine. It belongs to Storozhynets urban hromada, one of the hromadas of Ukraine.

From September 7, 1946 until April 6, 1995, the village was called Klyniwka (Ukrainian: Клинівка).

Until 18 July 2020, Panca belonged to Storozhynets Raion. The raion was abolished in July 2020 as part of the administrative reform of Ukraine, which reduced the number of raions of Chernivtsi Oblast to three. The area of Storozhynets Raion was merged into Chernivtsi Raion.
