= Kostyntsi =

Village in Chernivtsi Oblast, Ukraine

Coordinates: 48.278°N 25.649°E

Kostyntsi (Ukrainian: Костинці; Romanian: Costești; German: Kostestie) is a village in Chernivtsi Raion, Chernivtsi Oblast, Ukraine. It belongs to Storozhynets urban hromada, one of the hromadas of Ukraine.

Until 18 July 2020, Kostyntsi belonged to Storozhynets Raion. The raion was abolished in July 2020 as part of the administrative reform of Ukraine, which reduced the number of raions of Chernivtsi Oblast to three. The area of Storozhynets Raion was merged into Chernivtsi Raion.
