= Mykhalcha =

Village in Chernivtsi Oblast, Ukraine

- Village
- Interactive map of Mykhalcha
- Location within Ukraine Location within Chernivtsi Oblast
- Coordinates: 48°15′N 25°51′E
- Country: Ukraine
- Oblast: Chernivtsi Oblast
- Raion: Chernivtsi

Mykhalcha (Ukrainian: Михальча; Romanian: Mihalcea; German: Mihalcze) is a village in Chernivtsi Raion, Chernivtsi Oblast, Ukraine. It belongs to Kamiana rural hromada, one of the hromadas of Ukraine.

Until 18 July 2020, Mykhalcha belonged to Storozhynets Raion. The raion was abolished in July 2020 as part of the administrative reform of Ukraine, which reduced the number of raions of Chernivtsi Oblast to three. The area of Storozhynets Raion was merged into Chernivtsi Raion.

== Population ==
=== Language ===
Distribution of the population by native language according to the 2001 census:

Language	Number	Percentage
Ukrainian	2 227	99.20%
Other or undecided	18	0.80%
Total	2 245	100.00%
