= Stara Krasnoshora =

Commune in Chernivtsi Oblast, Ukraine

Stara Krasnoshora Cтара Красношора
- Rural settlement
- Location within Chernivtsi Oblast Location within Ukraine
- Coordinates: 48°02′18″N 25°31′45″E
- Country: Ukraine
- Oblast: Chernivtsi Oblast
- Raion: Chernivtsi Raion
- Hromada: Krasnoilsk settlement hromada

Government
  - Mayor: Stepan Drahun
- Elevation: 465 m (1,526 ft)

Population (2001)
  - Total: 745
- Time zone: UTC+2 (EET)
  - Summer (DST): UTC+3 (EEST)
- Postal code: 59023
- Area code: +380 3735
- Vehicle registration: CE/IE/26

Stara Krasnoshora (Ukrainian: Стара Красношора; German: Althütte; Polish: Stara Krasnoszora; Romanian: Crăsnișoara Veche or Huta Veche) is a village in Chernivtsi Raion, Chernivtsi Oblast, Ukraine. It belongs to Krasnoilsk settlement hromada, one of the hromadas of Ukraine.

Until 18 July 2020, Stara Krasnoshora belonged to Storozhynets Raion. The raion was abolished in July 2020 as part of the administrative reform of Ukraine, which reduced the number of raions of Chernivtsi Oblast to three. The area of Storozhynets Raion was merged into Chernivtsi Raion.

== Demographics ==
As of the 2001 Ukrainian census, Stara Krasnoshora had a population of 745. The majority of the population is ethnically Polish. The linguistic composition of the town was as follows:

Languages in Stara Krasnoshora
	percent
Polish	61.6%
Romanian	26.7%
Ukrainian	11.3%
Russian	0.4%
others	0.0%
