= Liudmyla Barbir =

Ukrainian actress and TV presenter

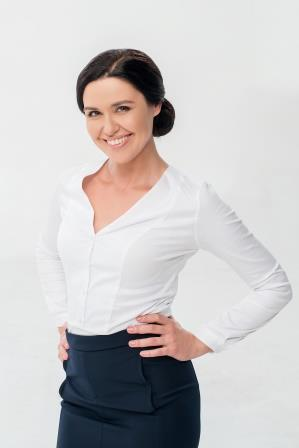
- Born: 30 November 1982 (age 43); Chornohuzy, Chernivtsi Oblast, Ukraine
- Occupations: Actress, television presenter
- Children: 1

Liudmyla Hryhorivna Barbir (born 30 November 1982) is a Ukrainian actress and TV presenter, cohosting the morning show Breakfast with 1+1 on the channel 1+1.

== Biography ==
Barbir was born on 30 November 1982 in the village of Chornohuzy, Vyzhnytsia Raion, Chernivtsi Oblast.

In 2004 she graduated from Kyiv National I. K. Karpenko-Karyi Theatre, Cinema and Television University with a degree in theater and film. She worked in the theaters "Ramp", "Bravo", "Theater perevtlennya" and others.

In 2007 she began to appear in commercials. In total, she has more than 20 works in this genre.

In 2011–2012, she was a host on the TV channel TET, the show Theory of Treason with Andrey Merzlikin.

Since 19 August 2013, she is paired with Ruslan Senichkin who has been conducting the morning show Breakfast with 1+1 on 1+1.

In 2016–2017, Liudmyla Barbir and Savva Libkin hosted the "Food in the Big City" culinary show at "Breakfast. Weekend" on the "1+1" TV channel.

Barbir took part in the dubbing of feature films and TV shows, including Avatar, The Wolverine and Our Matter in Warsaw.

=== Personal life ===
Barbir is married. Her husband is an aikido trainer. In 2012, she gave birth to a son, Taras.
