= Koniatyn, Chernivtsi Oblast =

Village in Chernivtsi Oblast, Ukraine

Koniatyn Конятин
- Village
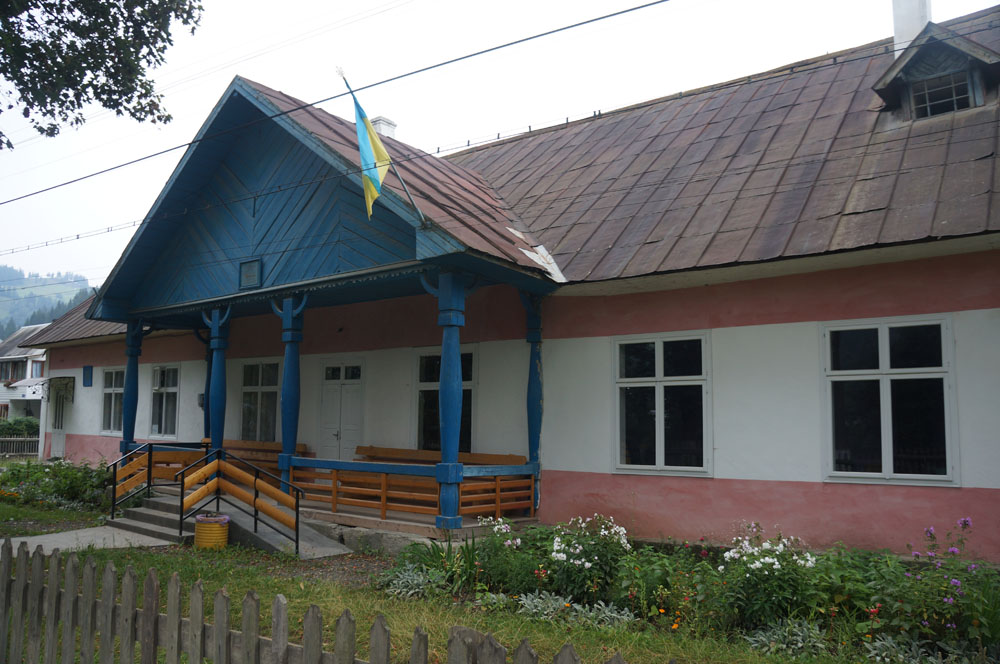
- Palace of Culture in Koniatyn

- Location of Koniatyn in Chernivtsi Oblast Location of Koniatyn in Ukraine
- Coordinates: 48°02′34″N 24°56′19″E
- Country: Ukraine
- Oblast: Chernivtsi Oblast
- Raion: Vyzhnytsia Raion
- First mentioned: 1774

Koniatyn (Ukrainian: Конятин; Romanian: Coniatin; German: Koniatyn) is a village in Vyzhnytsia Raion, Chernivtsi Oblast, in western Ukraine. It is the capital of Koniatyn rural hromada, one of the hromadas of Ukraine. Its population is 677 (as of 2024).

== History ==
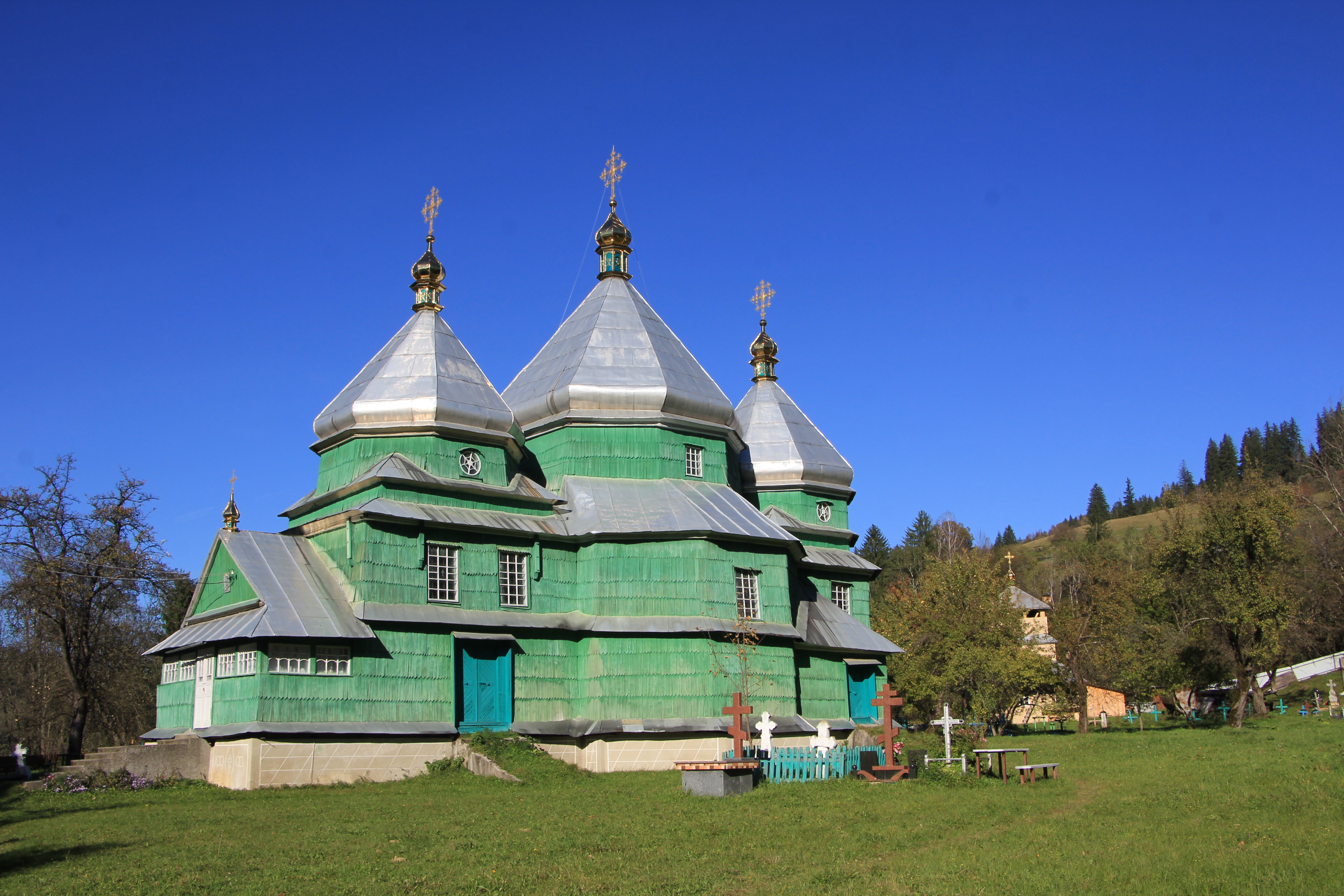
Sain Basil's Church

Koniatyn was first mentioned in 1774. Its residents supported peasant uprisings led by Lukjan Kobylytsia. The Austrian government responded by executing local leaders who supported Kobylytsia.

The village is home to a wooden church named the Basilian Church. The church was constructed in either 1790 or 1877, and it is part of the Ukrainian Greek Catholic Church.

== Notable residents ==
- Viktor Ferliievych, senior soldier of the Armed Forces of Ukraine killed during the War in Donbas.
- Anatolii Tomkiv, writer and journalist.
