= Cuisine of Odesa =

Culinary traditions of Odesa, Ukraine

The cuisine of Odesa in Ukraine is influenced by cultures of various regions, including Ukrainian, Russian, Jewish, Crimean Tatar, Armenian, Bulgarian, Moldovan, Greek, Georgian, French, German and Italian cultures. However, many recipes are indigenous to Odesa, with fusion cuisine being common.

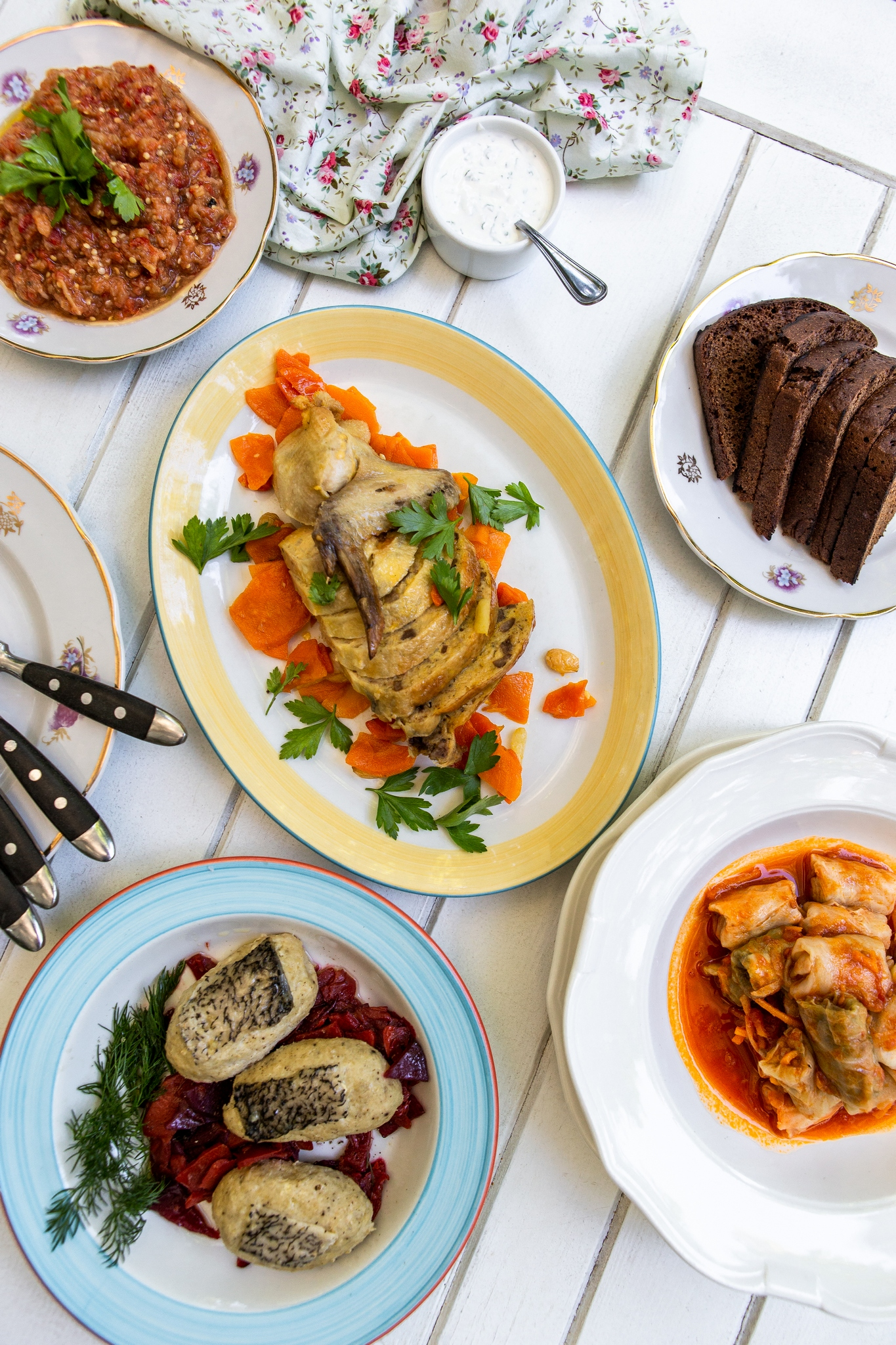
Dishes of Odesa cuisine: gefilte fish, helzel, aubergine dip, cabbage rolls "little fingers"

== Typical dishes ==
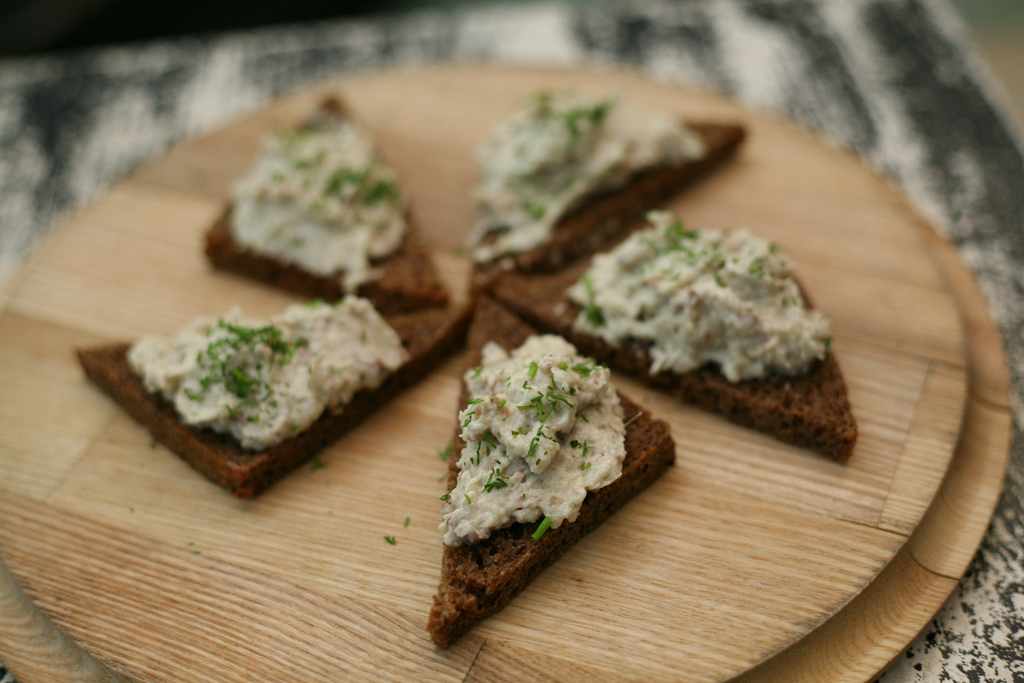
Odesa-style Vorschmack, served on rye bread

=== Appetizers ===
- Vorschmack
- Aubergine dip ("Aubergine caviar")
- Tzimmes
- "Bull's heart" tomato appetizer with bryndza
- Baked peppers with garlic
- Loader's sandwich from Pryvoz
- Odesa-style meze

=== Meat ===
- Essig-fleisch, beef stew with prunes
- Gefilte helzele, stuffed chicken neck
- Stuffed peppers
- Stuffed eggplants
- Cabbage rolls (holubtsi/golubtsy), "little fingers" and dolma

=== Fish and seafood ===
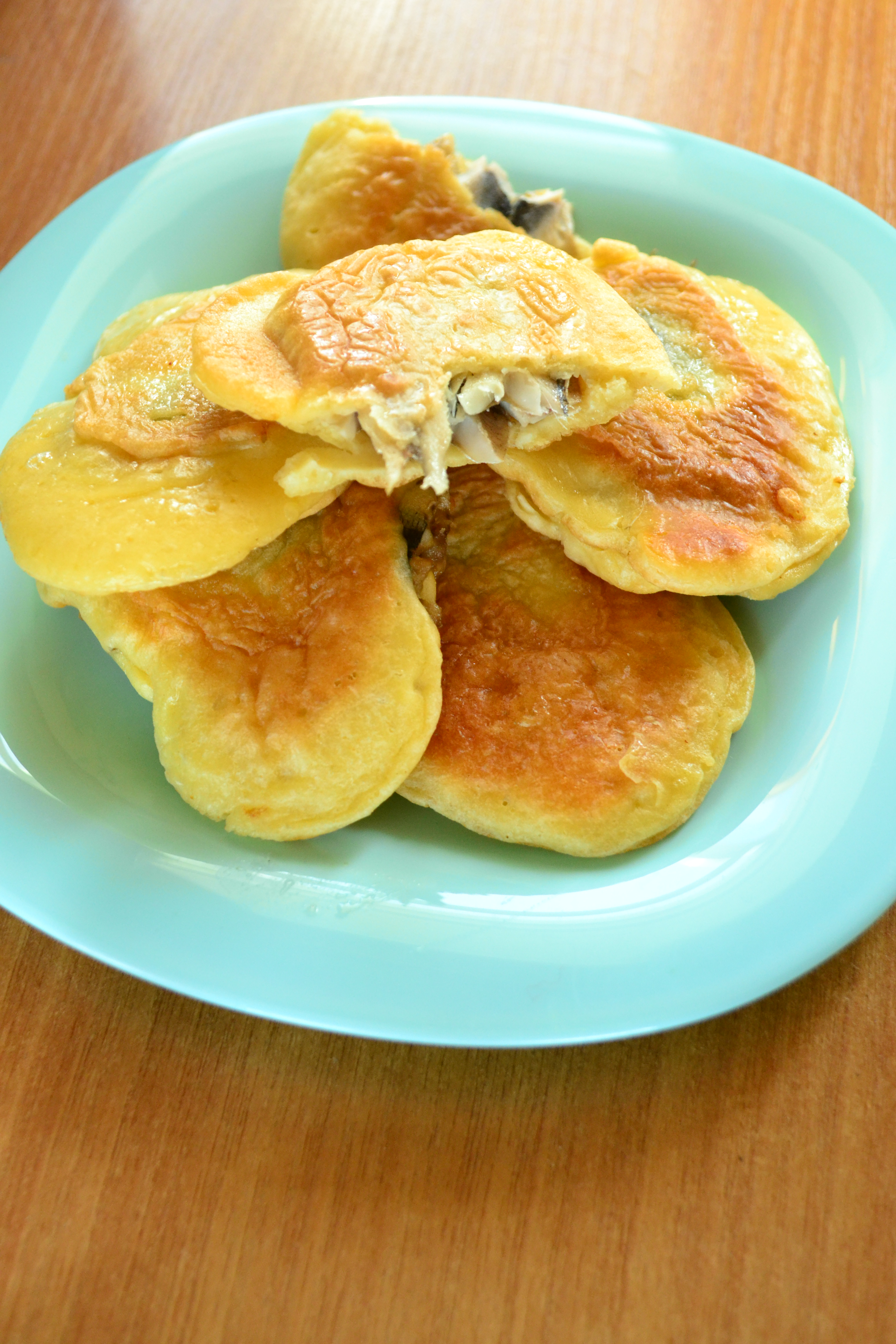
Sprat cutlets

- Gefilte fish
- Fried gobies
- Biliaivka fish soup (listed on the National Register of Intangible Cultural Heritage)
- Fried flounder
- Marinated fish
- Danube herring with baby potatoes
- Roe cutlets
- Odesa mussels
- Pilaf with mussels
- Black sea mussels on the beach
- Rapanas baked with cheese and garlic
- Boiled rachky (Palaemon adspersus)
- Sprat cutlets
- Deep-fried Black Sea sprats or tsatsa

=== Other ===
- Fried semolina
- Salamur, a sauce based on brine, garlic, spices, served with ukha or used as a dressing for vegetables
- Odesa borscht with gobies
- Placinte
- "5 minutes" pickled cucumbers

=== Desserts ===
- Varenyky with cherries
- Vertuta
- Blintzes (nalysnyky/nalistniki), "little fingers" with quark
- Napoleon cake
- Walnut-stuffed prunes

== Overview ==
"Odessa cuisine loves to sit, you shouldn't take it off the stove and swallow it quickly. Let it sit on the stove or in the refrigerator. Odessa bazaar smells. Odessa dill smells. Odessa garlic sticks fingers together. Odessa horse mackerel detaches from the ridge and melts in the mouth. Aubergine dip sharpens and flavours any pork chop. Odessa red borscht with beans. Green with egg ... From one chicken - neck, stuffed legs, broth, and noodles. Wine in Odessa is called "daddy made" - it is sucked through a tube from a 12-liter glass bottle. In short. Come to Odessa hungry, enjoy it, and eat".

— Mikhail Zhvanetsky, About Odesa cuisine

Due to its coastal location, Odesa cuisine includes a large number of seafood dishes. The most popular dish is gefilte fish, which is served on holidays using several types of fish, mainly pike, mullet or redlip mullet, carp, and pike perch. Fried fish is also popular. Preference is given to the Black Sea flounder and gobies. Cutlets are fried from small fish of the herring family, mainly Black Sea sprats. Pilaf with mussels is a popular Odesa seafood dish. Mussels are often fried on-site on large sheets of iron.

A traditional snack in Odesa is boiled shrimp, called rachky/rachki, in the Odesite slang.

Among cold appetizers, vorschmack is especially popular, as well as a dip made from grilled aubergines.

Stuffed chicken neck (gefilte helzele) and stuffed vegetables (bell peppers, zucchini, and aubergines) are very popular.

Another feature of Odesa cuisine is the tendency to reduce the size of individual food items while keeping the portion size unchanged. For example, pelmeni and varenyky, when interpreted by Odesa chefs, look different than the more traditional versions. In Odesa, pelmeni and varenyky are served at a small size, whereas varenyky in Ukrainian cuisine are as large as a fist. The most popular type of varenyky are cherry varenyky. Cabbage rolls in the Odesa culinary tradition are also made in a smaller size than is traditional elsewhere, with a preferred size called "the little finger." A popular dessert, called nalysnyky (blintzes with quark), is also quite small.

== Odesa specialties ==
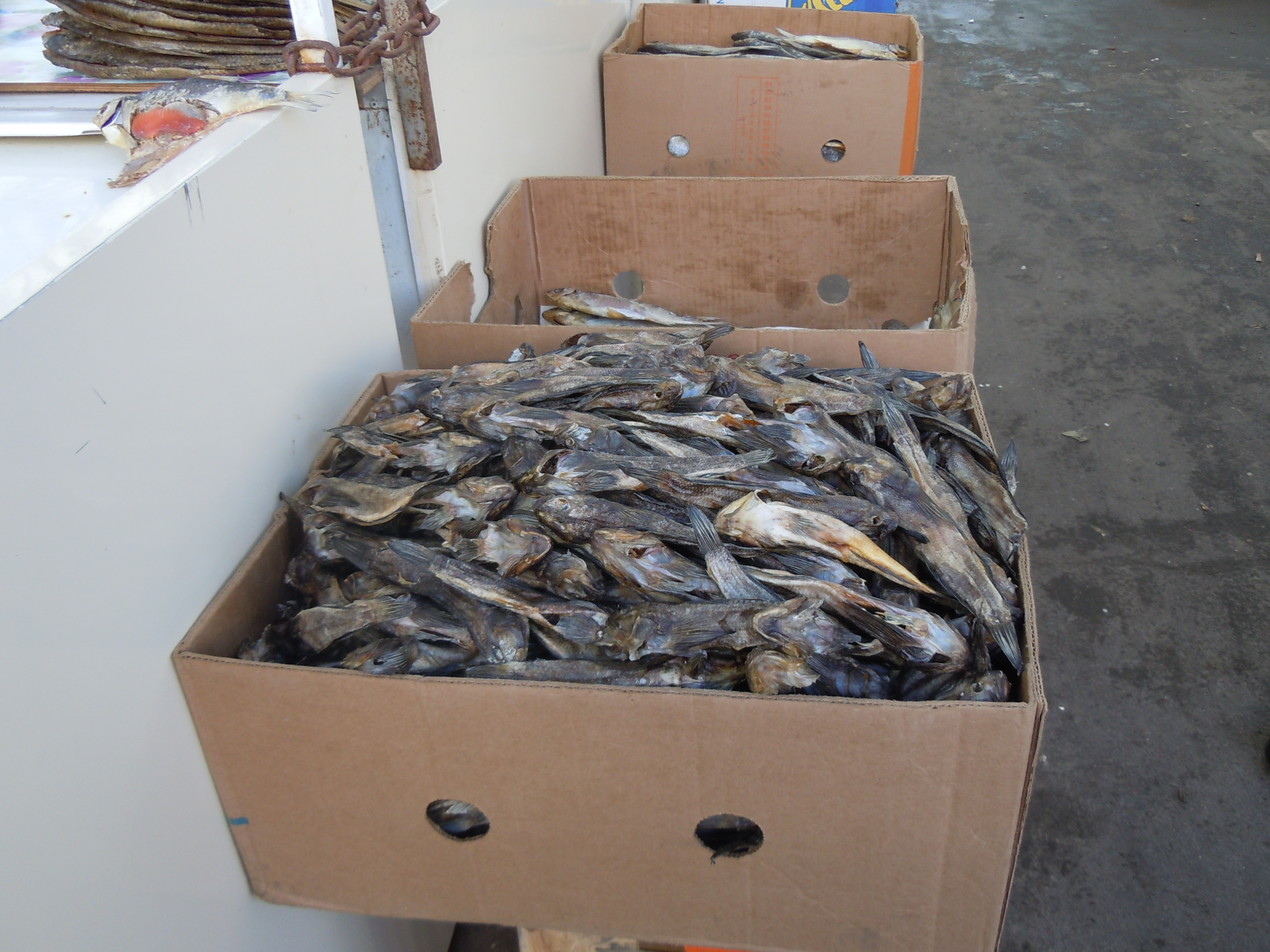
Dried gobies for sale on the market in Odesa

The specialties of Odesa and Odesa Oblast include:

- The forty-day potato variety grown in the village of Roksolany. This variety is distinguished by a short ripening period and excellent taste. The "forty-day" from Roksolany is considered the best potato variety in Odesa for making mashed potatoes and roasts;
- White crayfish from the village of Maiaky. Once, the Dniester estuary was considered the best place in the world for catching crayfish. The crayfish market no longer operates on an industrial scale; however, crayfish from Maiaky continue to be one of the most popular beer snacks in Odesa.
- The Mikado tomato is an early-ripening variety that takes 90–95 days from germination to ripening. The plants are tall (1–1.2 meters high). The fruits are flat and rounded, with an average weight of 150 - 200 g. This variety has a very high-quality taste and is used in salads in Odesa cuisine. Salad with Mikado and sheep cheese is especially popular.
- Gobies are fish of the perch family. In Odesa, gobies are divided into whips, herbalists, round timber, and sandpitters. They are caught with a donkey fishing rod, then fried or stewed in tomato. They can also be salted and dried, and served with beer.

"Whatever one may say, but gobies are another "sacred gastronomic cow" of the city by the very blue sea. Some Odessa residents, who grew up in Moldovan courtyards and remember the smell of fried gobies cooked outside in a primus stove, wry when people who got sunburnt on the first beach day, run to the nearest restaurant to try this local delicacy. They, those people, can tell you about their grandfather, about his tarred boat, about morning fishing and how you can catch gobies lazily from the pier. Then, without any hesitation, eat it for breakfast fresh, salted with seawater and seasoned with summer."

— Maria Kalenska, My Odessa: delicious gobies

- Black-Sea turbot is a fish of the Scophthalmidae family. Two species are caught in coastal waters: kalkan and brill. Kalkan is one of the largest members of the family, reaching a length of 115 cm and a weight of up to 28 kg. The second species, brill, differs from Kalkan, first of all in size: brills are smaller, and in habitat: they live at shallower depths and closer to the coast.
- Black Sea sprat is a small commercial sea fish of the herring family. In Odesa it is often called "sardelle". Not to be confused with Atherinaor European anchovy, the taste of which is somewhat poorer.
- Aubergine is a popular vegetable in Odesa cuisine. It is the main ingredient in aubergine dip.

"… From the aubergines we immediately made aubergine dip. Of course, not that bland, sweetish yellowish gruel, which is sold as canned food, but that real, home made, famous Odessa aubergine dip- the food of the gods! - green, with onions, vinegar, garlic, Moldavian pepper, devilishly spicy, from which "bites" are made on the lips ... In order to cook such a dip, the aubergines had to be (of course!) not boiled, and not to stewed, and, of course, not fried, but baked over coals. The aubergine should be charred. Then the skin is pilled from them, and the steaming, half-baked green pulp with white seeds is finely chopped. But God forbid chopping them with a knife. From contact with metal, the aubergine loses its natural green colour, turns black, and then the dip is no longer any good. The aubergines must be chopped only with a wooden knife. Then you get a real Odessa aubergine dip. What could be easier."

— Valentin Kataev, About aubergine dip

"And this combination of Jewish and Greek traditions remained. I cook it very often, especially if I want my table to have some accent. In every home has its own recipe, it is absolutely dietary, easily made, eaten as a pleasant spicy snack with a slice of black bread. It is cooked in large quantities, immediately before the arrival of guests, so that it does not wind up and does not give excess juice. Pairs well with everything except kissing. However, smells are obligatory for the food Odessa principle. Garlic, grease, dirty hands - one cannot leave the table sterile and light. Aubergine dip is good because it does not upset the balance either in the stomach or in the head."

— Anna Loshak, About aubergine dip

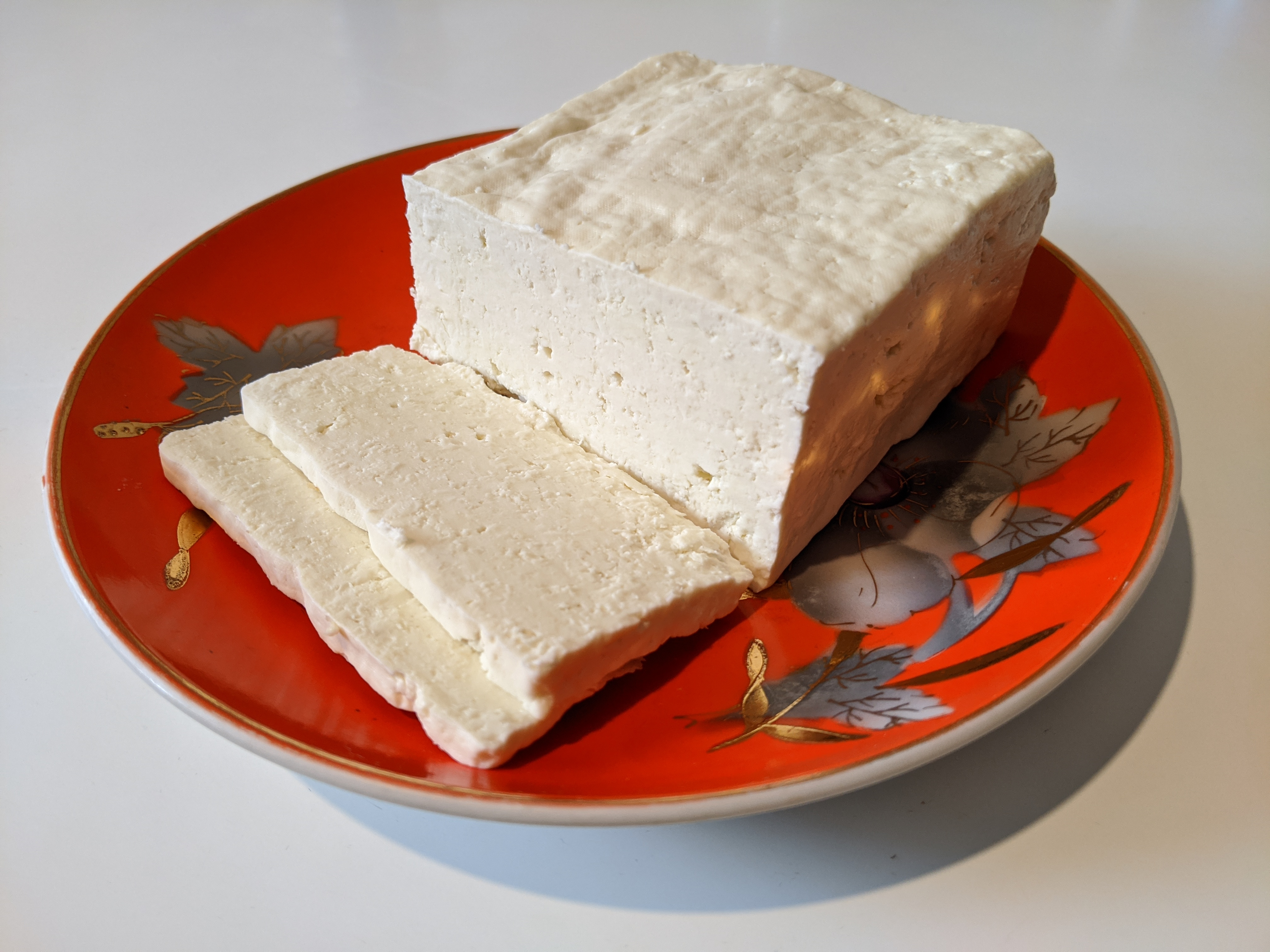
Bessarabian bryndza

- Bryndza, brine cheese made from cow, goat or sheep milk. It is used for making sandwiches, snacks, and salads, as well as hot dishes (for example, mamaliga) and as a filling for pastries. Aged Bessarabian sheep bryndza, salted in barrels, is especially popular among gourmet Odesa cuisine. It is usually soaked in fresh water for several hours before use.
- Frogs from Vylkove are used to cook deep-fried frog legs. The city of Vylkove in the Izmail Raion of Odesa Oblast became famous for eating and breeding frogs for export to France and other European countries.
- Odesa mussels
- Urda is a cheese made in Bessarabia from whey and sheep's milk. Used for making "quick" bread (gözleme).
- Bessarabian paprika is a spice made from a sweet variety of red pepper, in a pestle and mortar, and pound with vegetable oil. One of the most frequently used spices in Bessarabian cuisine.

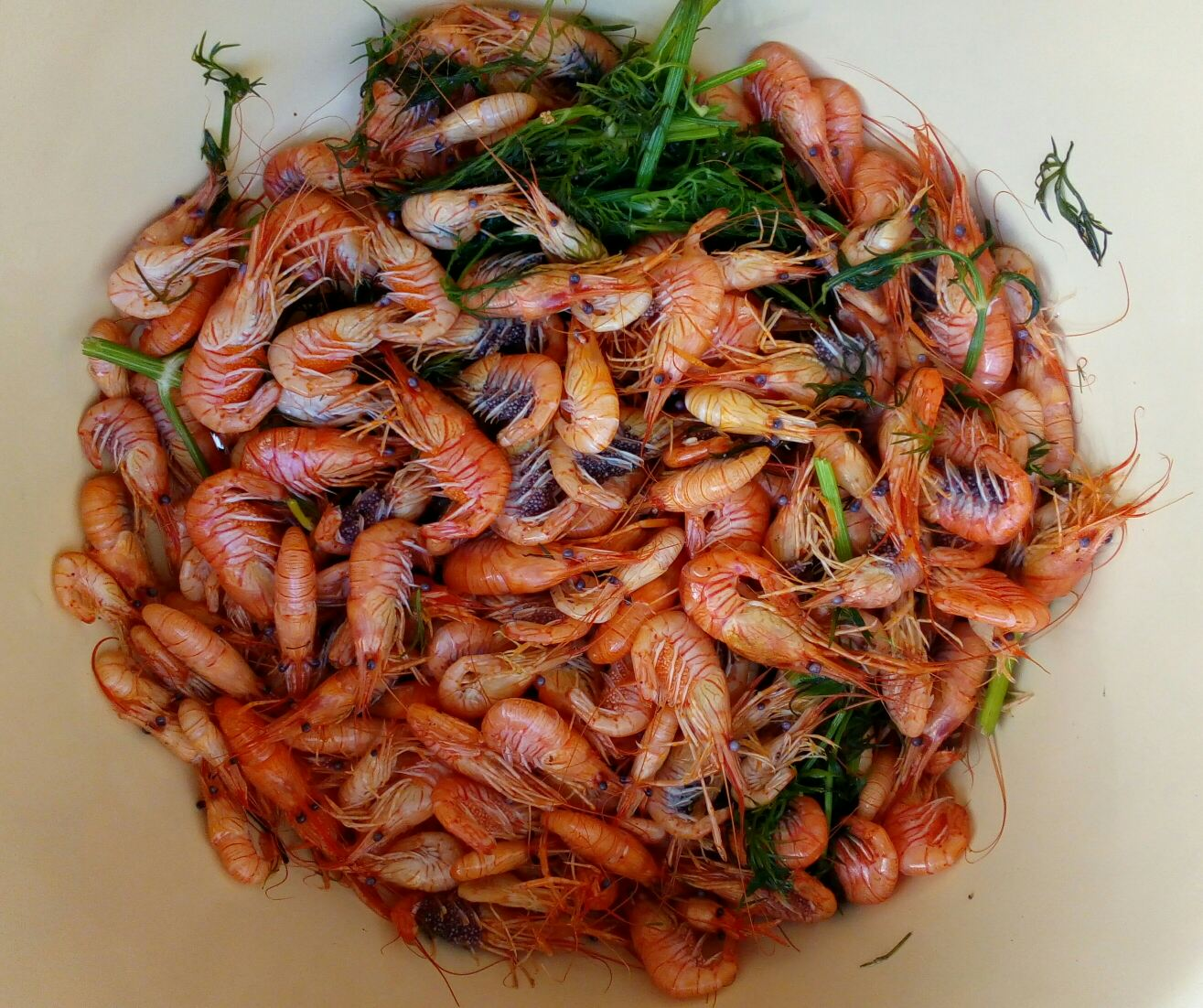
Boiled shrimp (rachky)

- Rachky (or rachki in Russian), the Black Sea herbal shrimp (Palaemon adspersus), has a high industrial value, is caught in the Black and Azov seas. Rachky are eaten in large quantities as snacks. Most often they are boiled, sometimes fried in a pan with garlic.

== Books about Odesa cuisine ==
- Kuleshova, Elena; Nagovitcina, Elena (2011). Одесская кухня в эмиграции [Odesa cuisine in emigration] (in Russian). Tallinn. ISBN 978-9985-9487-3-6.
- Popova, Marta (1992). Секреты одесской кухни [Secrets of Odesa cuisine] (in Russian). Dnepr: Днепрокнига. ISBN 5-89975-054-5.
- Nademlinsky, A. (2008). В дебрях одесской кухни [In the wilds of Odesa cuisine] (in Russian). Kyjiv: Грани-Т. ISBN 978-966-4650-70-7.
- Yavorska, A. (2005). Кулинарная книга от одесситок [A culinary book from Odesa women] (in Russian). Odesa: Optimum. ISBN 966-8149-36-X.
- Libkin, Savely (2013). My Odesa's Cuisine Моя Одесская кухня [My Odesa cuisine] (in Russian). Moscow: Экспо. ISBN 978-5-699-63635-8.
- Eden, Caroline (2018). Black Sea. Quadrille. p. 6. ISBN 978-1-787-13131-6.
