= Chereshenka =

Commune in Chernivtsi Oblast, Ukraine

Coordinates: 48°13′N 25°16′E

Chereshenka (Ukrainian: Черешенька; Romanian: Cireșel) is a commune (selsoviet) in Vyzhnytsia Raion, Chernivtsi Oblast, Ukraine. It belongs to Vyzhnytsia urban hromada, one of the hromadas of Ukraine.
