= Putyla Raion =

Former subdivision of Chernivtsi Oblast, Ukraine

Putyla Raion Путильський район
- Raion
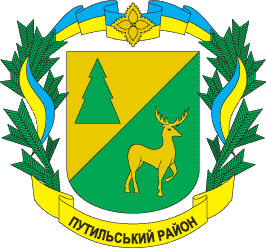
- Flag Coat of arms

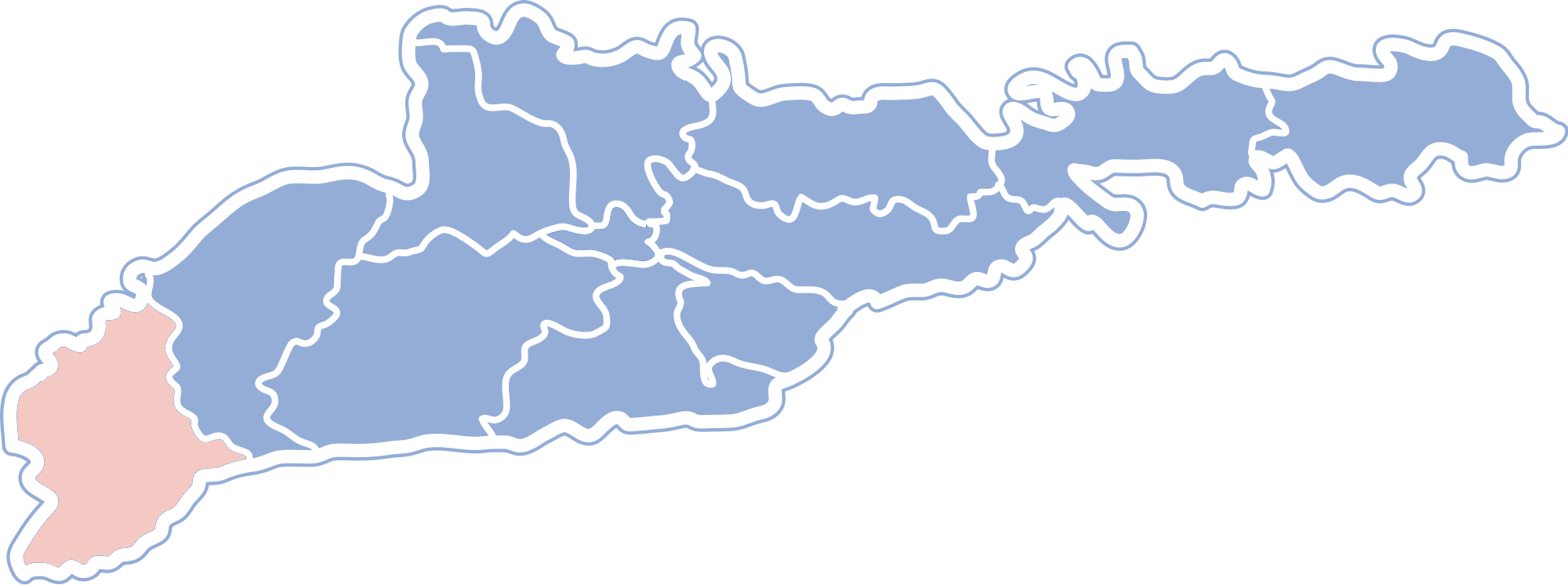
- Coordinates: 47°58′N 25°06′E
- Country: Ukraine
- Region: Chernivtsi Oblast
- Established: 1961
- Disestablished: 18 July 2020
- Admin. center: Putyla
- Subdivisions: List: — city councils; — settlement councils; — rural councils; Number of localities: — cities; — urban-type settlements; 50 — villages; — rural settlements

Area
  - Total: 884 km^{2} (341 sq mi)

Population (2020)
  - Total: 26,304
  - Density: 29.8/km^{2} (77.1/sq mi)
- Time zone: UTC+02:00 (EET)
  - Summer (DST): UTC+03:00 (EEST)
- Postal index: 591xx
- Area code: 380 3738
- Website: http://www.putyla.cv.ua

Putyla Raion (Ukrainian: Путильський район) was an administrative raion (district) in the southern part of Chernivtsi Oblast in western Ukraine, on the Romanian border. The raion was located in the historical region of Bukovina, and had an area of 884 square kilometres (341 mi^{2}). The administrative center of the raion was the urban-type settlement of Putyla. The raion was abolished on 18 July 2020 as part of the administrative reform of Ukraine, which reduced the number of raions of Chernivtsi Oblast to three. The area of Putyla Raion was merged into Vyzhnytsia Raion. The last estimate of the raion population was 26,304 (2020 est.)

At the time of disestablishment, the raion consisted of four hromadas:

- Koniatyn rural hromada with the administration in the selo of Koniatyn;
- Putyla settlement hromada with the administration in Putyla;
- Seliatyn rural hromada with the administration in the selo of Seliatyn;
- Ust-Putyla rural hromada with the administration in the selo of Ust-Putyla.

== See also ==
- Subdivisions of Ukraine
