= Karapchiv =

Karapchiv may refer to one of two villages in Chernivtsi Oblast, Ukraine:

- Karapchiv, Chernivtsi Raion, Chernivtsi Oblast
- Karapchiv, Vyzhnytsia Raion, Chernivtsi Oblast
