= Vyzhenka =

Ukrainian commune

Coordinates: 48°12′40″N 25°10′45″E

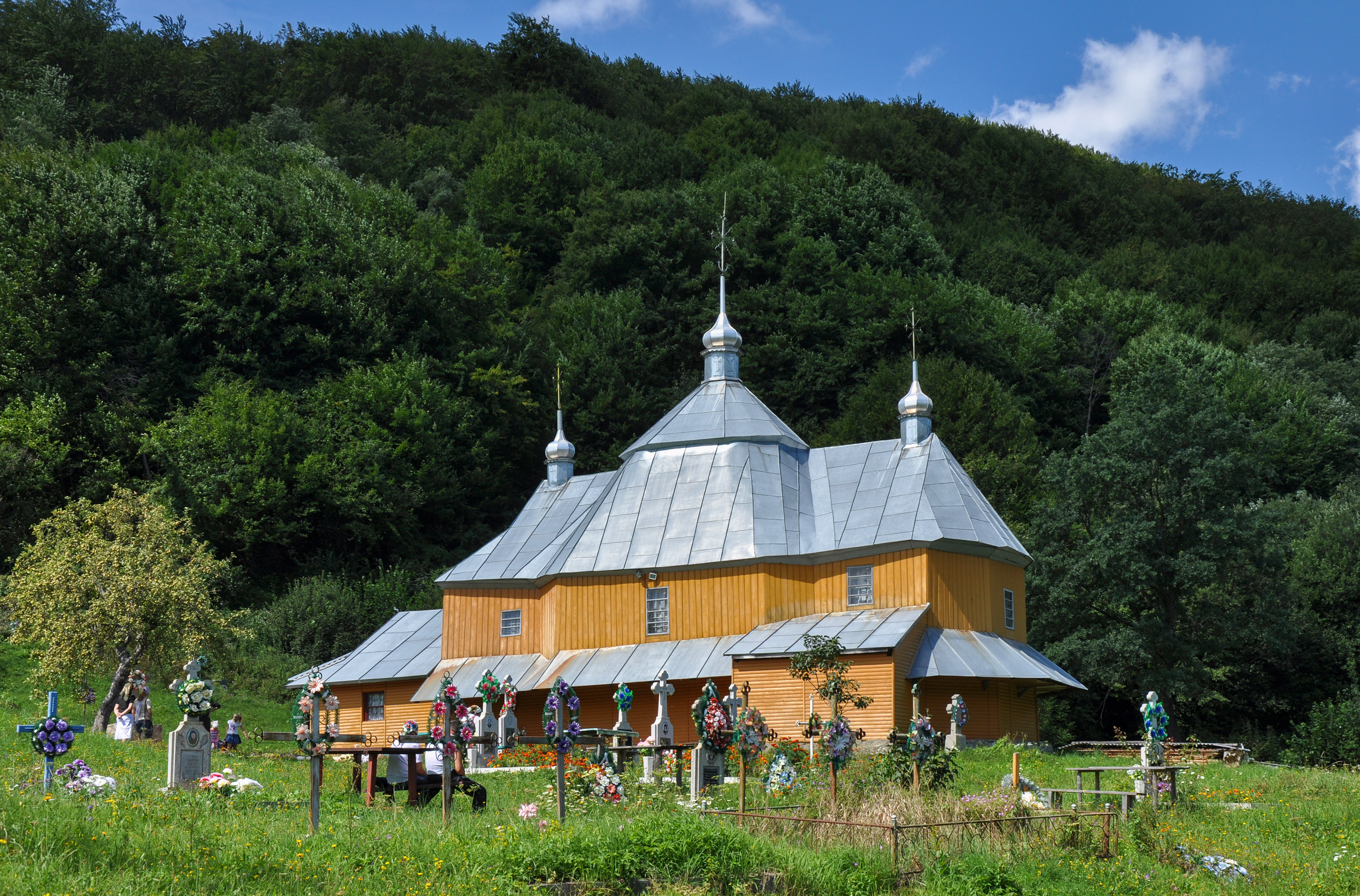
Vyzhenka Church of St. John of Suceava

Vyzhenka (Ukrainian: Виженка; Romanian: Vijnicioara) is a commune (selsoviet) in Vyzhnytsia Raion, Chernivtsi Oblast, Ukraine which belongs to Vyzhnytsia urban hromada, one of the hromadas of Ukraine.
