= Bahna, Ukraine =

Village in Vyzhnytsia Raion, Chernivtsi Oblast, Ukraine

Bahna Ukrainian: Багна Romanian: Bahna
- Location within Chernivtsi Oblast Location within Ukraine
- Coordinates: 48°13′28″N 25°13′52″E
- Country: Ukraine
- Oblast: Chernivtsi Oblast
- Raion: Vyzhnytsia Raion
- Time zone: UTC+2 (EET)
  - Summer (DST): UTC+3 (EEST)

Bahna (Ukrainian: Багна; Romanian: Bahna) is a commune (selsoviet) in Vyzhnytsia Raion, Chernivtsi Oblast, Ukraine. It belongs to Vyzhnytsia urban hromada, one of the hromadas of Ukraine.
