= Sloboda-Banyliv =

Sloboda-Banyliv (Ukrainian: Слобода-Банилів; Romanian: Slobozia Bănilei; German: Slobodzia-Banilla) is a village in Vyzhnytsia Raion, Chernivtsi Oblast, Ukraine. It belongs to Vashkivtsi urban hromada, one of the hromadas of Ukraine.
