= Ispas, Ukraine =

Village in Vyzhnytsia Raion, Chernivtsi Oblast, Ukraine

Ispas Іспас Ispas
- Village
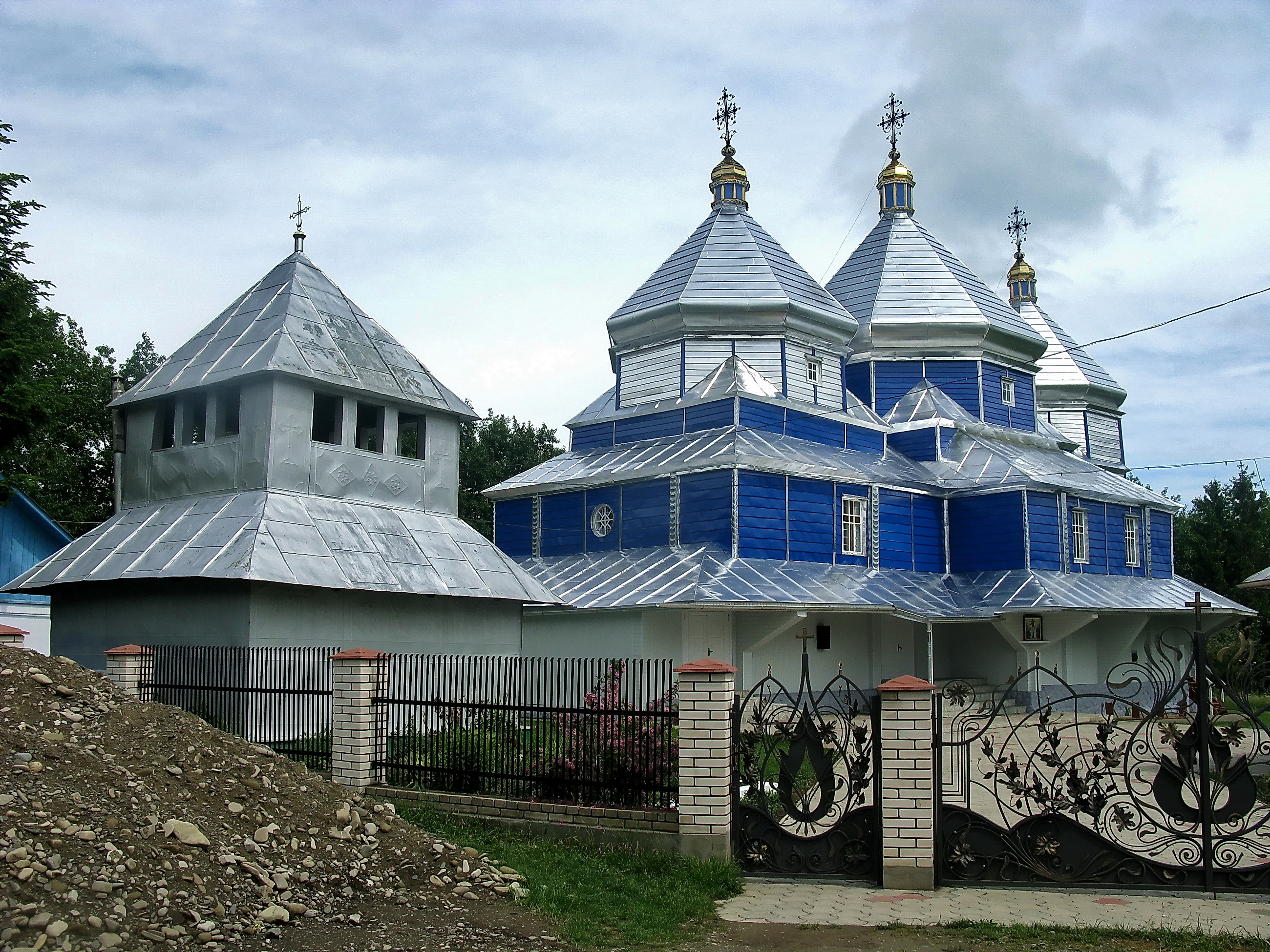
- Ascension Church and its bell tower
- Interactive map of Ispas
- Location within Chernivtsi Oblast Location within Ukraine
- Coordinates: 48°17′55″N 25°16′23″E
- Country: Ukraine
- Oblast: Chernivtsi Oblast
- Raion: Vyzhnytsia Raion
- Hromada: Vyzhnytsia urban hromada
- Time zone: UTC+2 (EET)
  - Summer (DST): UTC+3 (EEST)

Ispas (Ukrainian: Іспас; Romanian: Ispas) is a village in Vyzhnytsia Raion, Chernivtsi Oblast, Ukraine. It belongs to Vyzhnytsia urban hromada, one of the hromadas of Ukraine.
