= Zamostia =

Coordinates: 48°34′21″N 39°04′07″E

Zamostia (Ukrainian: Замостя; Romanian: Zamostea; German: Zamostie or Samostie) is a village in Vyzhnytsia Raion, Chernivtsi Oblast, Ukraine. It belongs to Vashkivtsi urban hromada, one of the hromadas of Ukraine.
