= Miliieve =

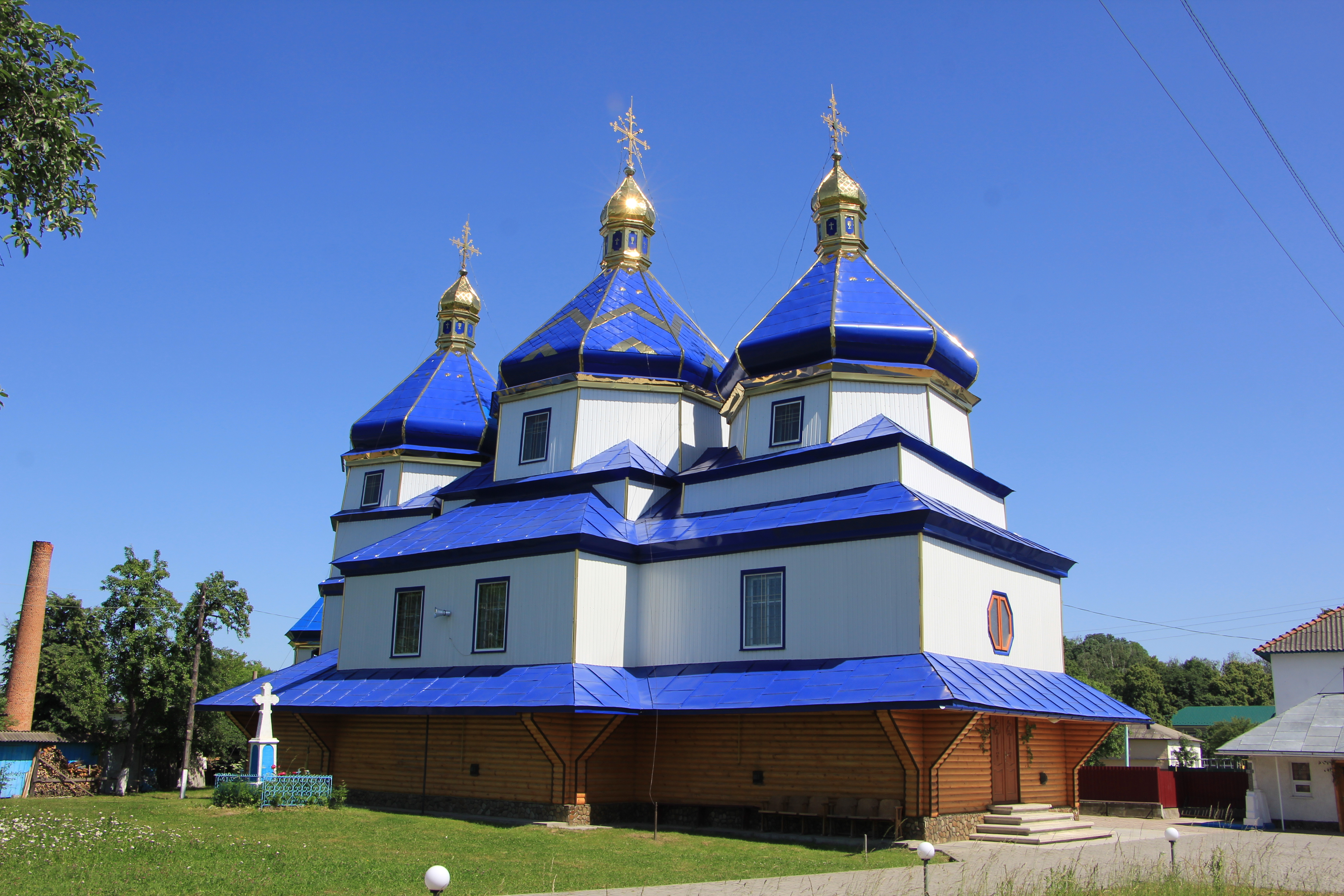
Wooden church of St. Paraskeva

Miliieve (Ukrainian: Мілієве; Romanian: Milie; Yiddish: מילי, romanized: Mili; German: Millie) is a village in Vyzhnytsia Raion, Chernivtsi Oblast, Ukraine. It belongs to Vyzhnytsia urban hromada, one of the hromadas of Ukraine.
