= Myhove =

Coordinates: 48°09′26″N 25°22′47″E

Myhove (Ukrainian: Мигове; Romanian: Mihova) is a village in Vyzhnytsia Raion, Chernivtsi Oblast, Ukraine. It belongs to Berehomet settlement hromada, one of the hromadas of Ukraine.
