= Seliatyn =

Commune in Chernivtsi Oblast, Ukraine

Selyatin Селятин Seletin (in Romanian)
- Village
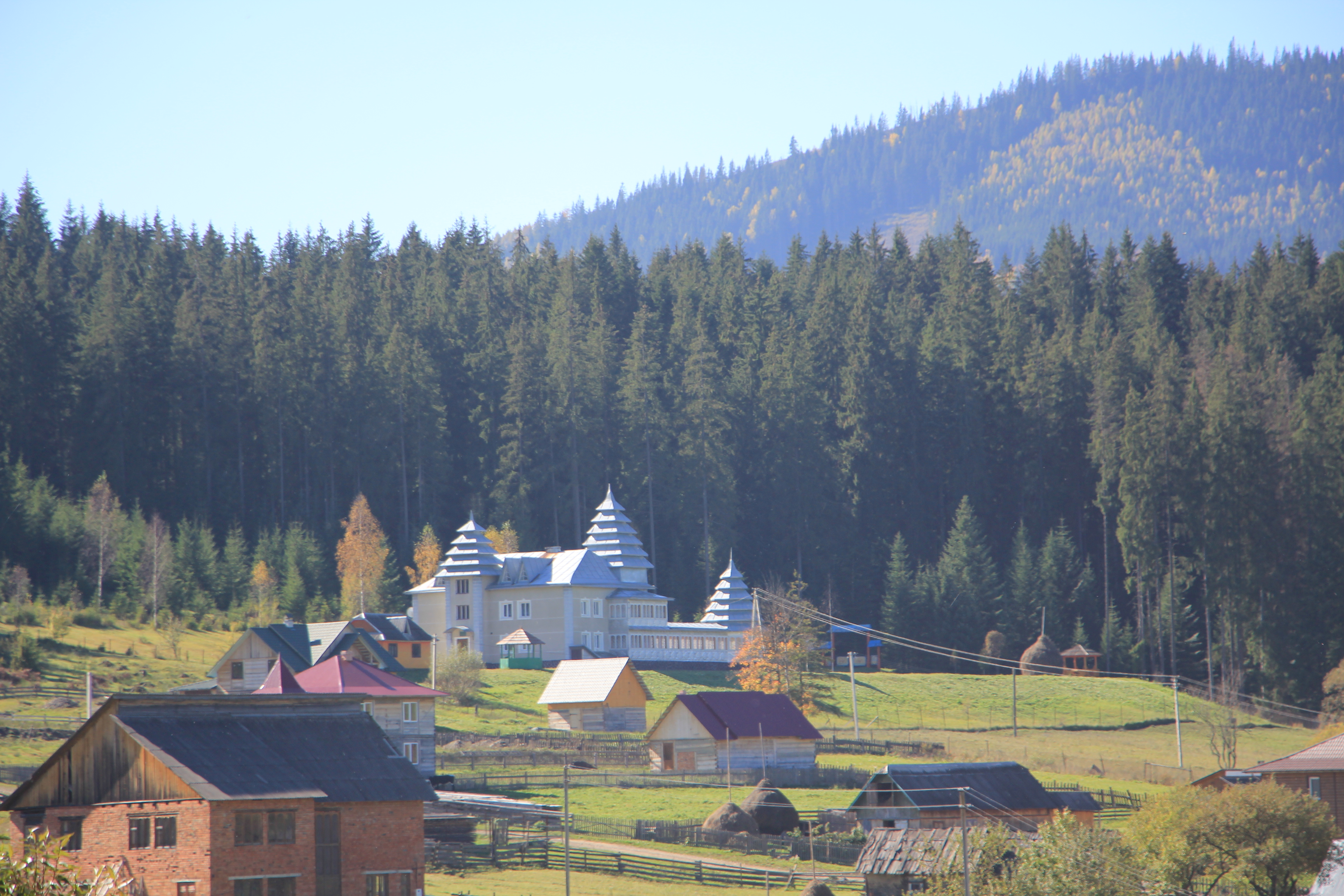

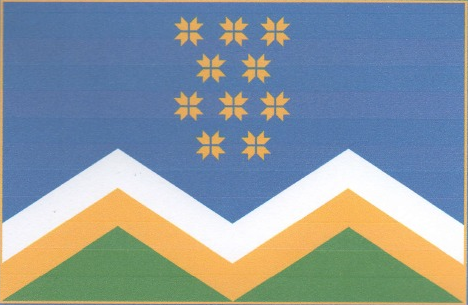
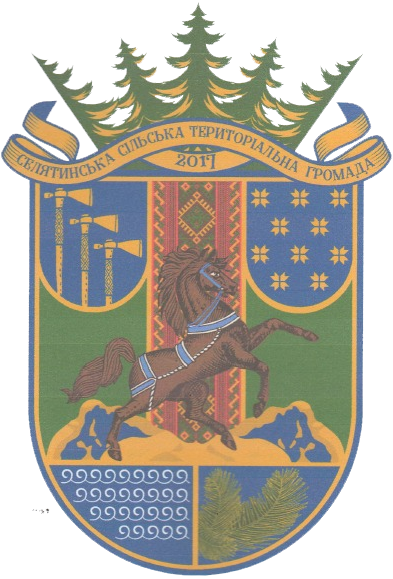
- Flag Coat of arms
- Interactive map of Selyatin
- Location in Chernivtsi Oblast Location in Ukraine
- Coordinates: 47°52′25″N 25°11′10″E
- Country: Ukraine
- Oblast: Chernivtsi Oblast
- Raion: Vyzhnytsia Raion
- Elevation: 628 m (2,060 ft)

Population (2021)
  - Total: 2,380
- Time zone: UTC+2 (EET)
  - Summer (DST): UTC+3 (EEST)
- Postal code: 59131
- Area code: +380 738

Selyatyn (Ukrainian: Селятин; Romanian: Seletin) is a village in Vyzhnytsia Raion, Chernivtsi Oblast, Ukraine. It hosts the administration of Seliatyn rural hromada, one of the hromadas of Ukraine.

Until 18 July 2020, Seliatyn belonged to Putyla Raion. The raion was abolished in July 2020 as part of the administrative reform of Ukraine, which reduced the number of raions of Chernivtsi Oblast to three. The area of Putyla Raion was merged into Vyzhnytsia Raion.

== Geography ==
=== Climate ===
Climate data for Seliatyn (1981–2010)
Month	Jan	Feb	Mar	Apr	May	Jun	Jul	Aug	Sep	Oct	Nov	Dec	Year
Mean daily maximum °C (°F)	0.5 (32.9)	2.1 (35.8)	5.9 (42.6)	11.8 (53.2)	17.7 (63.9)	20.5 (68.9)	22.4 (72.3)	22.2 (72.0)	17.6 (63.7)	13.0 (55.4)	6.5 (43.7)	1.5 (34.7)	11.8 (53.2)
Daily mean °C (°F)	−5.7 (21.7)	−4.5 (23.9)	−0.5 (31.1)	5.1 (41.2)	10.7 (51.3)	13.8 (56.8)	15.7 (60.3)	15.1 (59.2)	10.5 (50.9)	5.7 (42.3)	−0.1 (31.8)	−4.3 (24.3)	5.1 (41.2)
Mean daily minimum °C (°F)	−10.8 (12.6)	−9.8 (14.4)	−5.6 (21.9)	−0.3 (31.5)	4.5 (40.1)	7.9 (46.2)	9.8 (49.6)	9.3 (48.7)	5.1 (41.2)	0.5 (32.9)	−4.8 (23.4)	−8.9 (16.0)	−0.3 (31.5)
Average precipitation mm (inches)	29.5 (1.16)	33.4 (1.31)	44.3 (1.74)	62.2 (2.45)	103.0 (4.06)	129.4 (5.09)	143.2 (5.64)	114.9 (4.52)	73.0 (2.87)	47.0 (1.85)	36.6 (1.44)	34.7 (1.37)	851.2 (33.51)
Average precipitation days (≥ 1.0 mm)	7.9	8.0	10.0	10.9	13.2	14.9	14.1	12.0	9.3	8.5	7.3	8.5	124.6
Average relative humidity (%)	80.8	81.6	80.6	79.3	77.2	78.5	78.5	79.8	81.2	82.4	84.7	85.9	80.9
Source: World Meteorological Organization
