= Ust-Putyla =

Village in Chernivtsi Oblast, Ukraine

Ust-Putyla Усть-Путила
- Village
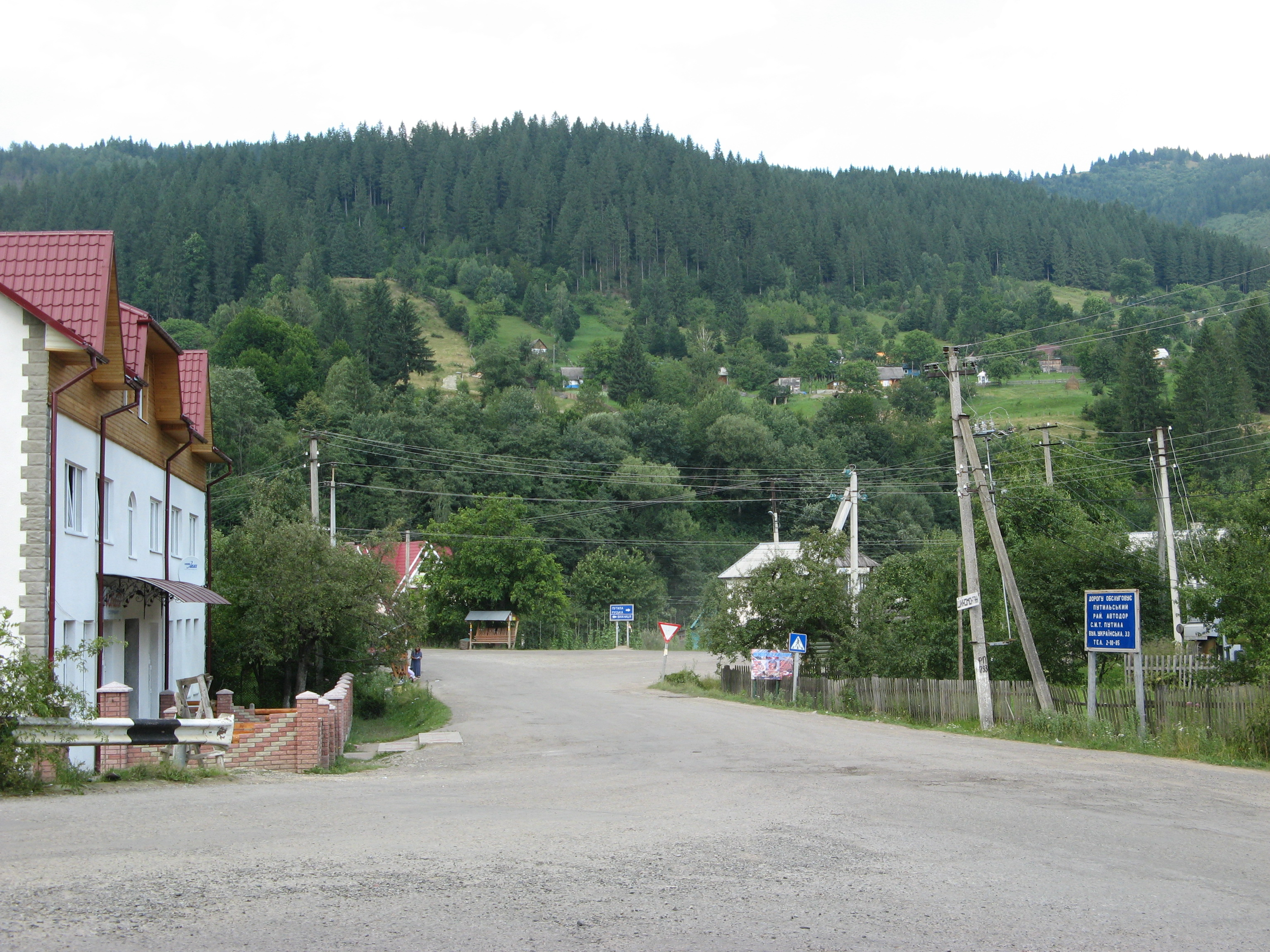

- Location of Ust-Putyla in Chernivtsi Oblast Location of Ust-Putyla in Ukraine
- Coordinates: 48°06′36″N 25°02′30″E
- Country: Ukraine
- Oblast: Chernivtsi Oblast
- Raion: Vyzhnytsia Raion
- First mentioned: 18th century

Ust-Putyla (Ukrainian: Усть-Путила; Romanian: Gura Putilei) is a village in Vyzhnytsia Raion, Chernivtsi Oblast, in western Ukraine. It is the capital of Ust-Putyla rural hromada, one of the hromadas of Ukraine. Its population is 623 (as of 2024).

== Overview ==
Ust-Putyla was first mentioned in the 18th century, although by that point it had already existed for centuries prior. Its name descends from the Ukrainian word брід (brid), or "ford", as it is surrounded on all sides but one by the Putylka river. The village's residents joined the peasant uprising led by Lukjan Kobylytsia. The village is inhabited by Hutsuls. A varenyky festival was held in the village in September 2021.

Ust-Putyla is home to the wooden Saint Paraskeva Church, which belongs to the Ukrainian Orthodox Church (Moscow Patriarchate). In 2021, ₴7,000 was stolen from the church by unknown perpetrators.

== Notable people ==
- Oleh Klymenko, historian, writer, journalist, and colonel of the Armed Forces of Ukraine.
- Vasylyna Sumariak, pysanka painter.
