= Yuriy Fedkovych =

Ukrainian writer

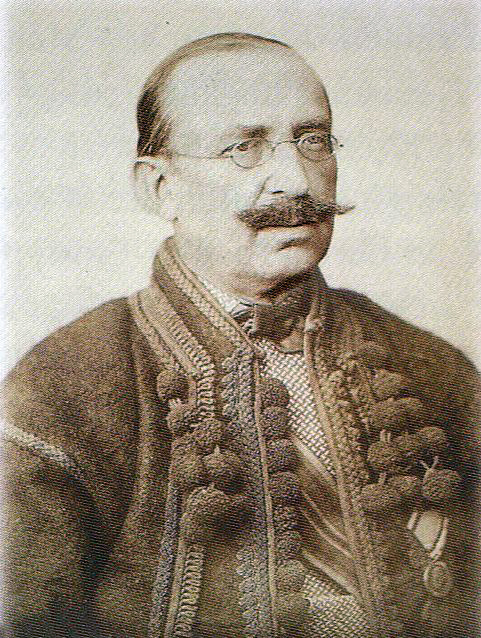
Yuriy Fedkovych

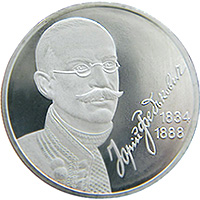
Ukrainian coin featuring Yuriy Fedkovych

Osyp-Yuriy Adalbertovych Fedkovych (Ukrainian: О́сип-Ю́рій Адальбертович Федько́вич, 8 August 1834, Putyla - 11 January 1888, Chernivtsi) was a Ukrainian writer, poet, folklorist and translator.

== Biography ==
Fedkovych lived in Chernivtsi, where he was a close associate of Rudolf Neubauer, the editor of Bukowina, the first German literary supplement in the city, and also the creator of the German language literary circle in Chernivtsi.

He edited the first Ukrainian-language newspaper in Bukovina.

In 1989 Chernivtsi University was renamed Yuriy Fedkovych Chernivtsi National University in his memory.

== Works ==
- ' The soldier's daughter'. Translated by Roma Franko. In Sonia Morris, ed., From days gone by: selected prose fiction, Toronto: Language Lanterns Publications, 2008.

== See also ==
- Osyp Makovei
