= Karapchiv, Vyzhnytsia Raion, Chernivtsi Oblast =

Village in Vyzhnytsia Raion, Chernivtsi Oblast, Ukraine

Karapchiv Карапчів Carapciu pe Ceremuș
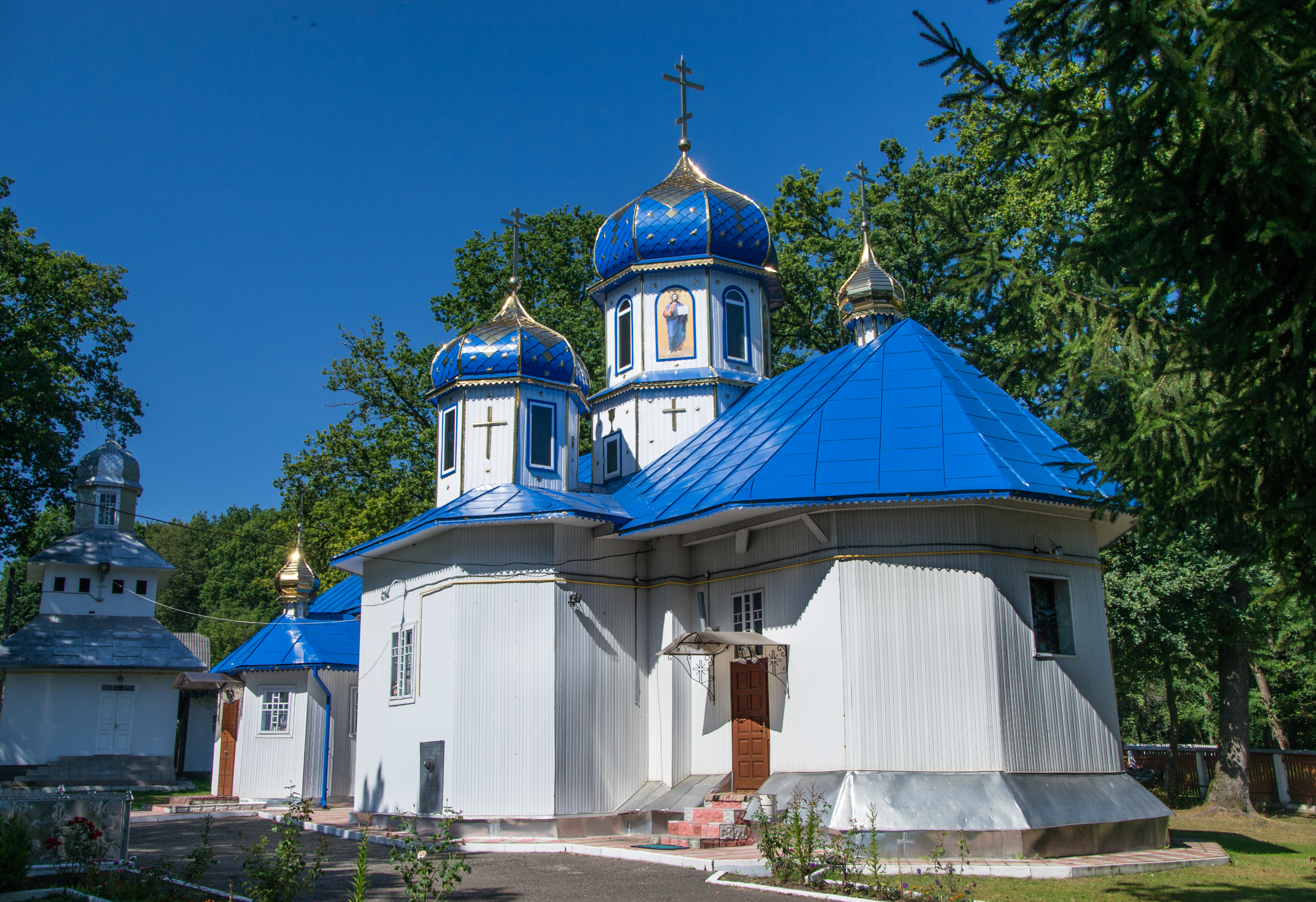
- Church of the Nativity of the Virgin

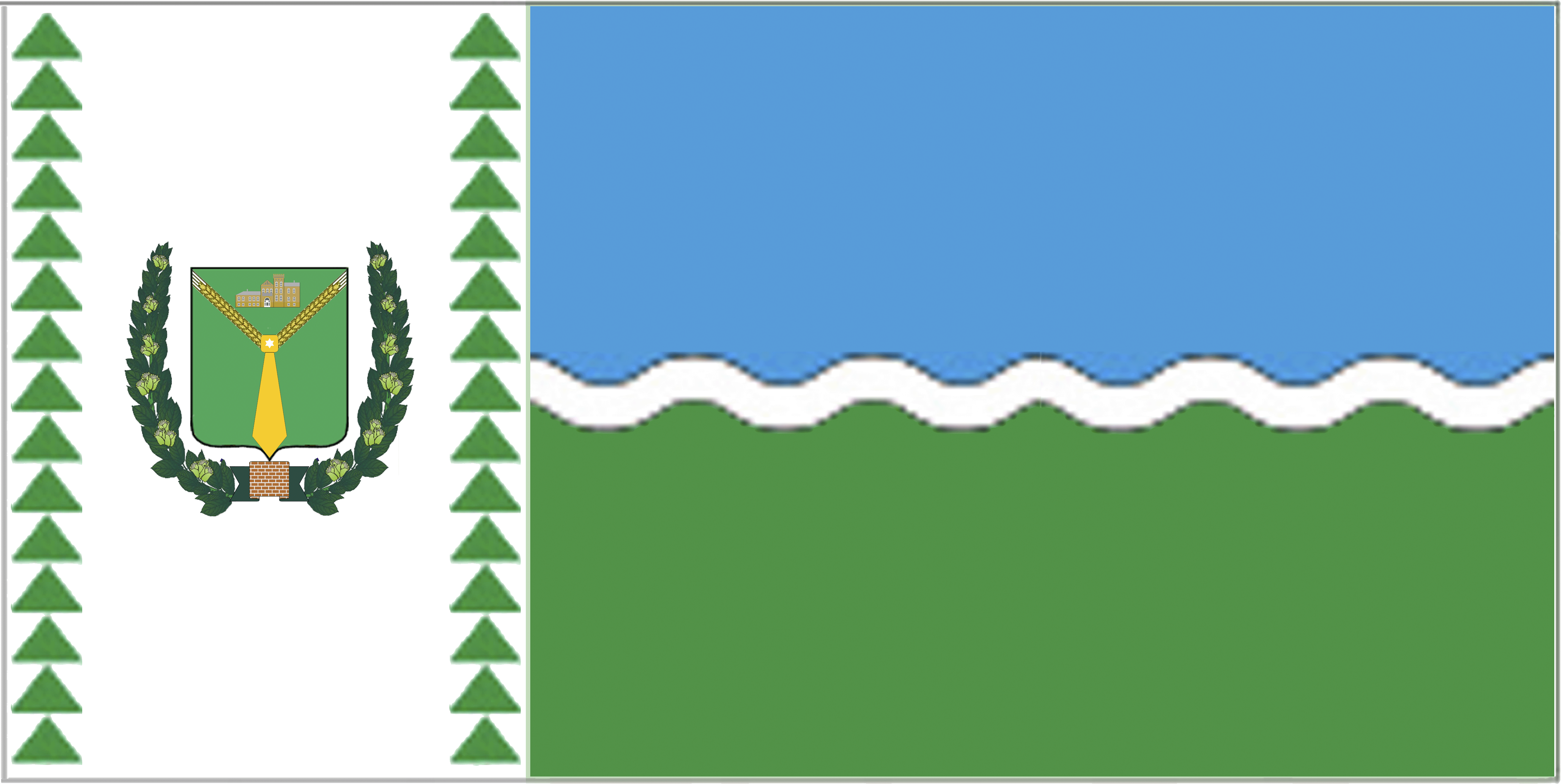
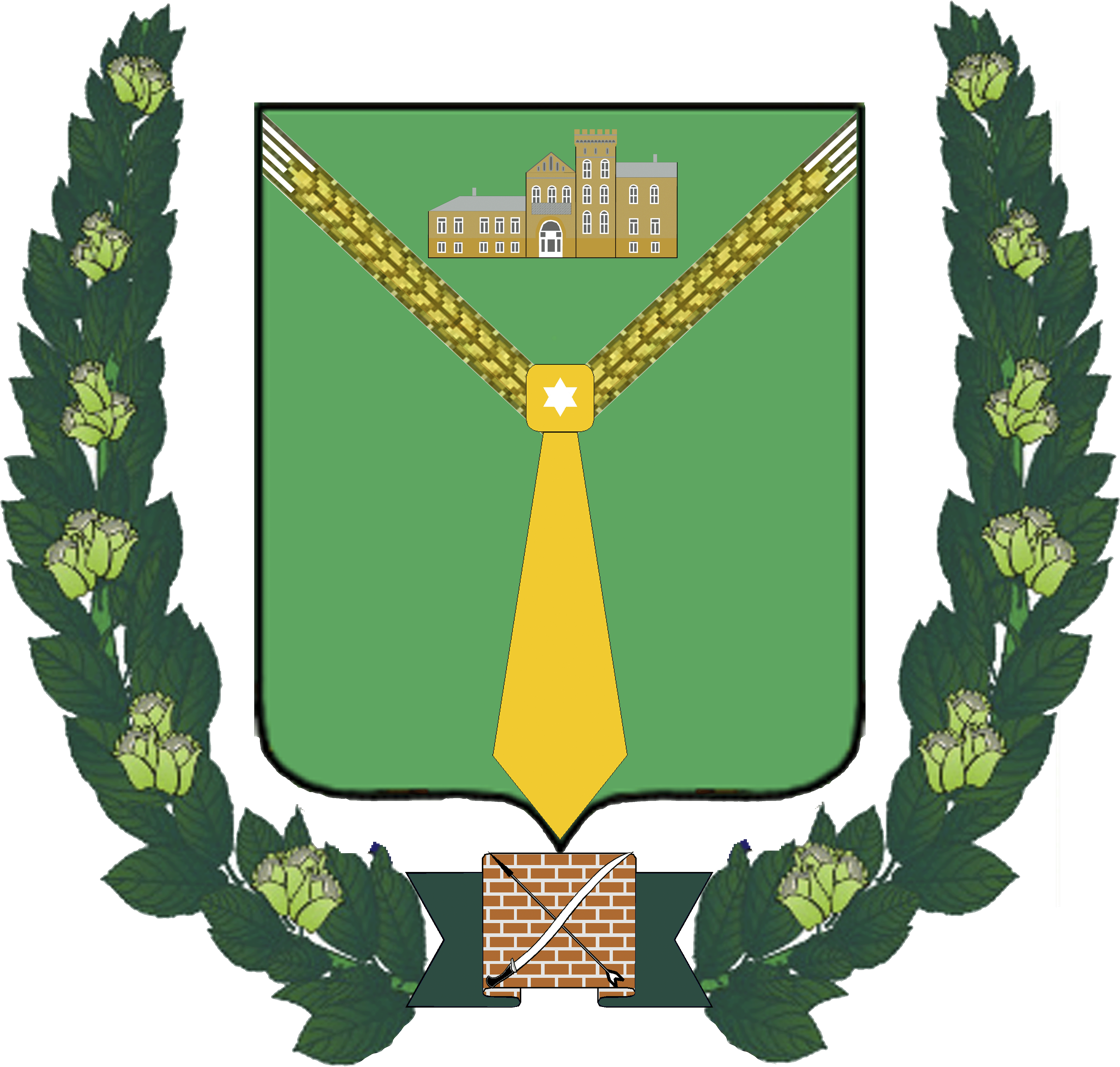
- Flag Coat of arms
- Interactive map of Karapchiv
- Location within Chernivtsi Oblast Location within Ukraine
- Coordinates: 48°19′49″N 25°27′12″E
- Country: Ukraine
- Oblast: Chernivtsi Oblast
- Raion: Vyzhnytsia Raion
- Hromada: Vashkivtsi urban hromada
- Founded: before 1816

Government
  - Head: Volodymyr Luchak
- Elevation: 280 m (920 ft)

Population (2001)
  - Total: 2,158
- Time zone: UTC+2 (EET)
  - Summer (DST): UTC+3 (EEST)
- Postal code: 59225
- Area code: +380 3730
- KOATUU: 7320583001
- KATOTTH: UA73020070060061638

Karapchiv (Ukrainian: Карапчів; Romanian: Carapciu pe Ceremuș; German: Karapcziu) is a village in Vyzhnytsia Raion, Chernivtsi Oblast, Ukraine. It belongs to Vashkivtsi urban hromada, one of the hromadas of Ukraine.
