= Savva Libkin =

Restaurant chain founder

- Лібкін Савелій Ілліч
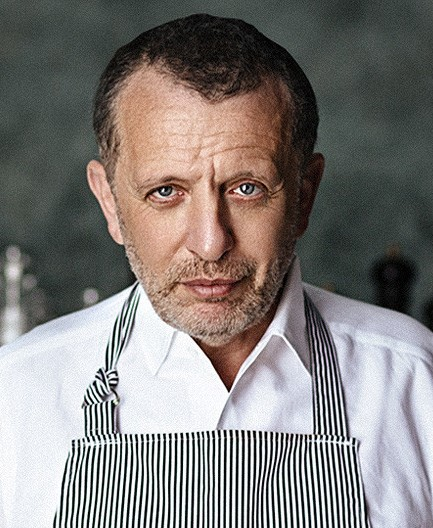
- Born: September 28, 1961 (age 64); Odesa, Ukrainian SSR, USSR
- Citizenship: Ukraine
- Occupations: Restaurateur, entrepreneur, author, television personality
- Website: savva-libkin.com

Savely Illich Libkin (born September 28, 1961, Odesa, Ukrainian SSR) is the founder and owner of the "Savva Libkin's Restaurants" chain. Visionary behind the National Restaurant Award "Salt." Author of books on cooking and business.

== Activity ==
In 1979, he graduated from the Odesa Culinary School with a degree in "Cook." In 1984–1988, he studied in absentia at the Vocational School of Public Catering majoring in "Public Catering Technology." From 1981 to 1983, he was deputy director of the Fontan restaurant. From 1984 to 1993, he worked at the Municipal Enterprise "School Meals" as a cook and production manager. Later, under his leadership, this school canteen was singled out as a separate project—a small enterprise manufacturing ready-to-cook food products.

In 1993, Libkin and his partner introduced the Drive-In catering concept: at first, they took orders and delivered pizza by car, and then, motorists themselves came to buy pizza to eat in the car. In the same year, the Drive-In company was founded. Two years later, Savva started the Pan Pizza pizzeria. In 1998, two more of his establishments appeared in Odesa: "Steakhouse" and "Greenwich Café."

In 2001, the founders of the Drive-In company opened "Café La Veranda" in the capital of the Czech Republic. In 2002, "Steakhouse" was rebranded as "Steakhouse. Meat and wine." That same year, the Pan Pizza brand launched its own franchise. In 2004, Libkin opened the Dacha restaurant on the French Boulevard, which became the flagship of Odesa's cuisine.

In 2005, "Drive-In" was transformed into the RESTA Corporation that included more than 40 restaurants in Ukraine and Czechia. In 2007, a new chain of cafés—"Kompot"—appeared. In 2008, the culinary school "Meat&Wine" was opened at "Steakhouse", and in 2009, the children's culinary school "Milk&Cheese" at "Dacha" welcomed its young students.

In 2012, Libkin founded "Tavernetta", an Italian restaurant in Odesa serving traditional dishes of the Emilia-Romagna region. In 2015, a Kompot café began operating in Kyiv under the franchising model, and the following year, Libkin opened the Fish on Fire restaurant there. In 2017, "Steakhouse" expanded to Kyiv, and "Fish on Fire" opened its doors in Odesa.

In 2018, the RESTA Corporation became the "Savva Libkin's Restaurants" company.

"Savva is an entrepreneur who created a business not so much for himself as for the community. … I visit his restaurants, the most popular in the city, and very often, I meet Savva himself, who personally greets guests. Savva is an interesting, thinking interlocutor. And it is always a privilege for a guest to communicate with such a host!" Vladyslav Burda, Ukrainian entrepreneur.

== Books ==
Savely Libkin was the first to bring Odesa's cuisine from private kitchens of Odesan apartments into the world of catering and developed the basic principles of the local cuisine. For a decade, together with like-minded people, he has been researching Odesa's cuisine, collecting and preserving original recipes, discovering the most delicious dishes in Odesa and the region, and cooking and tasting them. The result of these 'field studies' was two books: "My Odesa's Cuisine," published in 2013, and "The Odesa's Feast from Privoz to Deribasovskaya," which came out in 2015.

In 2018, "My Odesa's Cuisine" was translated into English. The following year, it was presented on behalf of Ukraine at the 2019 London Book Fair.

Libkin sees his mission in making Odesa's cuisine—not only traditional, but also new—a global brand. His plans for the future envisage holding festivals of Odesa's cuisine.

In 2021, Savva Libkin's third book, "The Odesa-Style Business: How to Build a Network Without Losing Yourself," was published.

== Social initiatives ==
Savva Libkin's company joined the initiative of the "Monsters Corporation" Charitable Foundation, contributing to the implementation of the Good Lunch project. Some Odesa eateries, including "Kompot," cook hot lunches daily and hermetically seal them for further distribution to low-income city residents, the elderly, people with disabilities, and families in financial difficulty.

In 2020, during the coronavirus pandemic, Libkin and his team ran the "You Ate, Now Feed a Doctor" campaign, providing doctors with hot meals.

Also, during the lockdown, Savva began live streaming on Facebook, telling and showing how to cook various dishes, and received positive feedback from the audience. Recordings of these cooking classes formed the basis of his YouTube channel, which subsequently began to grow.

Since 2022, after the full-scale invasion of Ukraine by the Russian Federation, the "Savva Libkin's Restaurants" company has been actively involved in volunteering. A significant portion of the profits is spent on cooking hot meals to be then delivered to soldiers of the Armed Forces of Ukraine and combat medics.

== Creative projects ==
Savva Libkin has been a columnist for the Forbes Ukraine magazine since 2011. That same year, he headed the convivium of the "Slow Food" NGO.

In 2016–2017, Libkin and Liudmyla Barbir hosted the "Food in the Big City" culinary show at "Breakfast. Weekend" on the "1+1" TV channel.

Savva is also a top speaker at the Creative Chefs Summit international conferences.

== Achievements ==
The restaurant "Café La Veranda" in Prague was included in the Michelin Red Guide in 2003. Savva and his partner were the first and remain the only Ukrainian restaurateurs to have achieved this Michelin Guide award to date.

The Tavernetta restaurant was awarded the Golden Palm as the best conceptual restaurant in 2013 by the Leaders Club International.

Libkin's book "My Odesa's Cuisine" was presented in Beijing at the "World Cookbook Fair—Gourmand International"—Gourmand Awards in the category "Best Eastern Europe Cuisine Book." This recognition followed the book's success in receiving the By-country Gourmand Awards 2014 in two categories: Best Chef and Local Cuisine.

In 2019, Libkin entered the Top 30 most influential Odesans according to the "New Voice of Ukraine" magazine.

== Interesting facts ==
- Savely began cooking on his own at the age of 9 under the guidance of his grandmother, Rozalia Moiseevna Vykhodets.
- The first Coca-Cola promo action in Odesa was held with "Pan Pizza" in 1994.
- Libkin began to learn Ukrainian at the age of 62.
