= Chornohuzy =

Chornohuzy Чорногузи
- Location in Ukraine Chornohuzy (Ukraine)
- Coordinates: 48°16′14″N 25°13′39″E
- Country: Ukraine
- Oblast: Chernivtsi Oblast
- Raion: Vyzhnytsia Raion

Population (2024)
  - Total: 2,950
- Time zone: UTC+2 (EET)
  - Summer (DST): UTC+3 (EEST)

Chornohuzy (Ukrainian: Чорногузи; Romanian: Ciornohuzi; German: Czornohuzy) is a village located in Vyzhnytsia Raion, Chernivtsi Oblast, Ukraine. It belongs to Vyzhnytsia urban hromada, one of the hromadas of Ukraine.
