= Vashkivtsi =

City in Chernivtsi Oblast, Ukraine

Vashkivtsi Вашківці Vășcăuți
- City
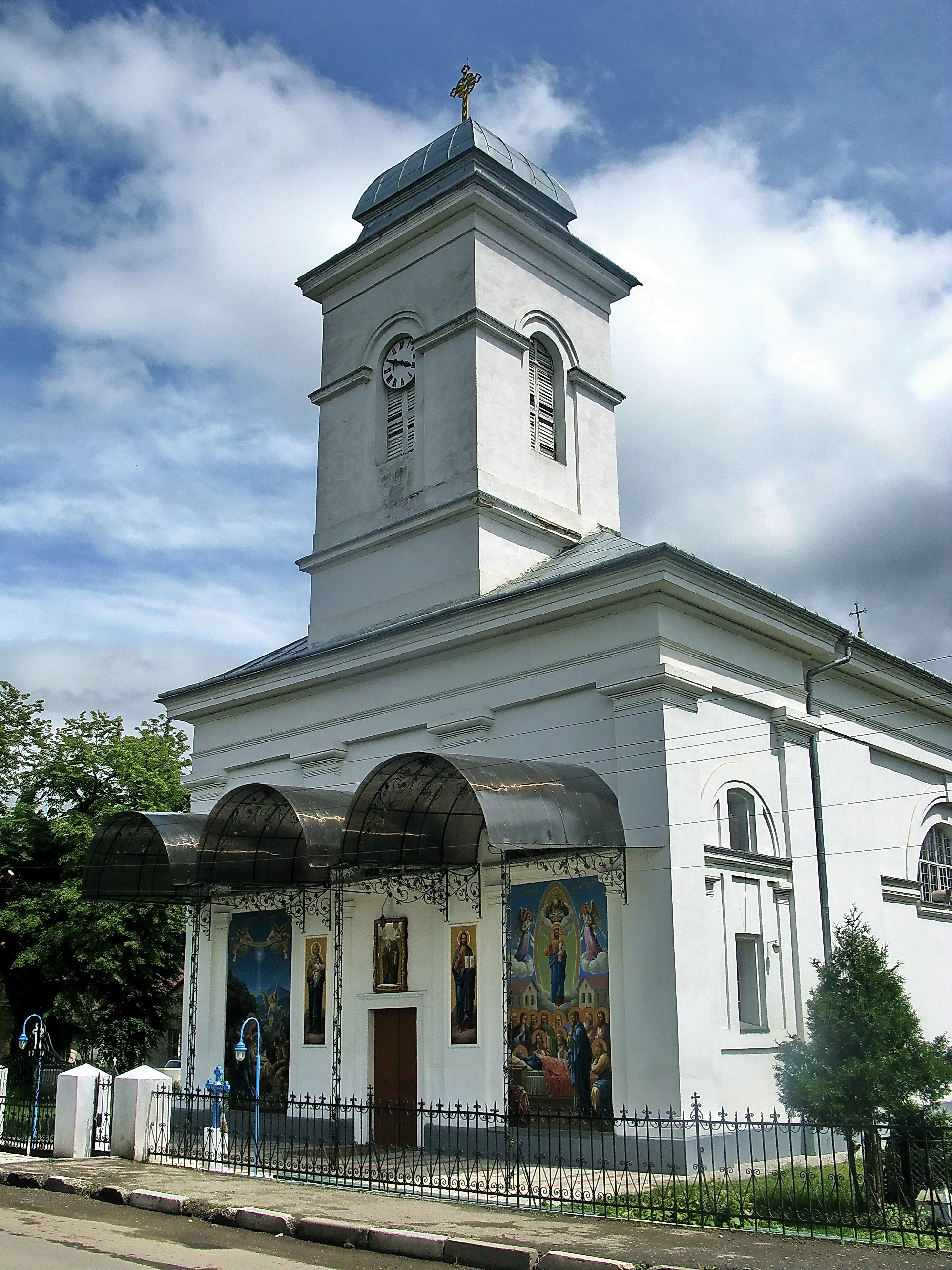
- Saint Nicholas Church

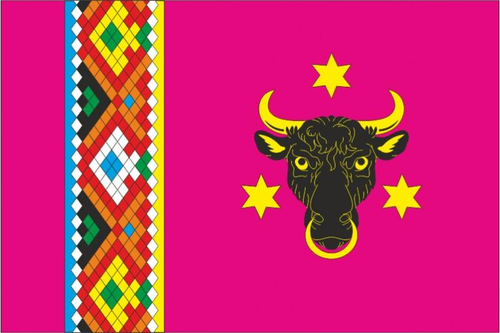
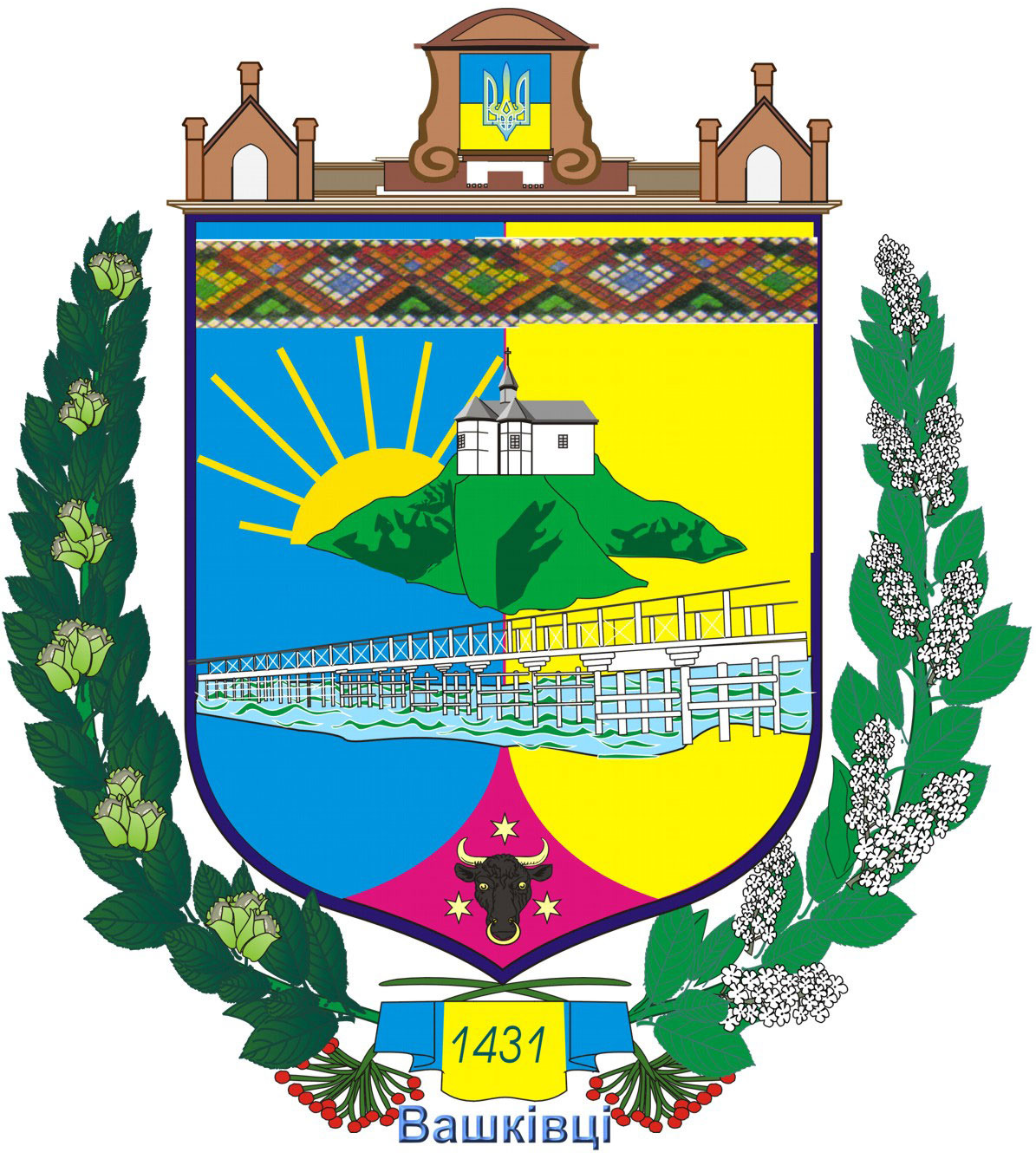
- Flag Coat of arms
- Interactive map of Vashkivtsi
- Location within Chernivtsi Oblast Location within Ukraine
- Coordinates: 48°22′31″N 25°29′52″E
- Country: Ukraine
- Oblast: Chernivtsi Oblast
- Raion: Vyzhnytsia Raion
- Hromada: Vashkivtsi urban hromada

Government
  - Mayor: Mykola Perch

Area
  - Total: 6.8 km^{2} (2.6 sq mi)
- Elevation: 211 m (692 ft)

Population (2022)
  - Total: 5,215
  - Density: 770/km^{2} (2,000/sq mi)
- Time zone: UTC+2 (EET)
  - Summer (DST): UTC+3 (EEST)
- Postal code: 59210-212
- Area code: +380 3730
- Website: http://www.vashkivtsi.com/

Vashkivtsi (Ukrainian: Вашківці, IPA: [ˈwɑʃkiu̯ts⁽ʲ⁾i]; Romanian: Vășcăuți; German: Waschkautz or Waskoutz; Yiddish: וואַסקעוויץ, romanized: Vashkovitz; Russian: Вашковцы, romanized: Vaškovcy) is a city in Vyzhnytsia Raion of Chernivtsi Oblast (province) of Ukraine. It is located in the historical region of Bukovina. It hosts the administration of Vashkivtsi urban hromada, one of the hromadas of Ukraine. Population: 5,215 (2022 estimate).

One village is administered by the town, Voloka (Ukrainian: Волока, Romanian: Voloca).

== History ==
The name of the town comes from the personal name Vas'ko. The first written mention of Vashkivtsi dates back to the 15th century, in the 1430s.

Settlement established in 1903 as Waskoutz am Czeremosz within the Austro-Hungarian Duchy of Bukovina.

City since 1940.

In January 1989, the population was 5811 people.

In January 2013, the population was 5406 people.

== Transport ==
There is a railway station in Vashkivtsi.

== Notable people ==
- Alexander von Petrino, Romanian landowner, former Minister of Agriculture of Austria.
- John Hnatyshyn, Canadian lawyer, Senator and father of Ray Hnatyshyn, the twenty-fourth Governor General of Canada.
- Tina Karol, Ukrainian singer and songwriter, who represented her country in the Eurovision Song Contest 2006, placing seventh; her father is from Vashkivtsi.
