= Vyzhnytsia urban hromada =

Urban hromada in Chernivtsi Oblast, Ukraine

Vyzhnytsia urban hromada Вижницька міська громада
- Hromada
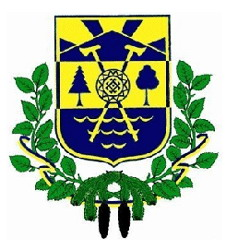
- Seal
- Interactive map of Vyzhnytsia urban hromada
- Country: Ukraine
- Oblast: Chernivtsi
- Raion: Vyzhnytsia

Area
  - Total: 183.5 km^{2} (70.8 sq mi)

Population (2023)
  - Total: 16,794
  - Density: 91.52/km^{2} (237.0/sq mi)
- Settlements: 10
- Cities: 1
- Villages: 9
- Website: vnmiscrada.gov.ua

Vyzhnytsia urban territorial hromada (Ukrainian: Вижницька міська територіальна громада, romanized: Vyzhnytska miska terytorialna hromada) is a hromada of Ukraine, located in the western Chernivtsi Oblast. Its administrative centre is the city of Vyzhnytsia.

Vyzhnytsia urban hromada has an area of 183.5 km^{2} (70.8 mi^{2}). Its population is 16,794 (as of 2023).

Prior to the 2020 administrative reform in Ukraine, Vyzhnytsia urban hromada was founded as an amalgamated hromada on 18 December 2016. As part of the administrative reform, it was expanded into its current form.

== Settlements ==
In addition to one city (Vyzhnytsia), (Note: Part of Vyzhnytsia urban amalgamated territorial hromada before 2020.) the hromada contains nine villages:

- Bahna
- Vyzhenka
- Ispas
- Kybaky
- Maidan
- Miliieve
- Serednii Maidan
- Chereshenka
- Chornohuzy
