= Lukian Kobylytsia =

Bukovinian Ukrainian activist and political leader

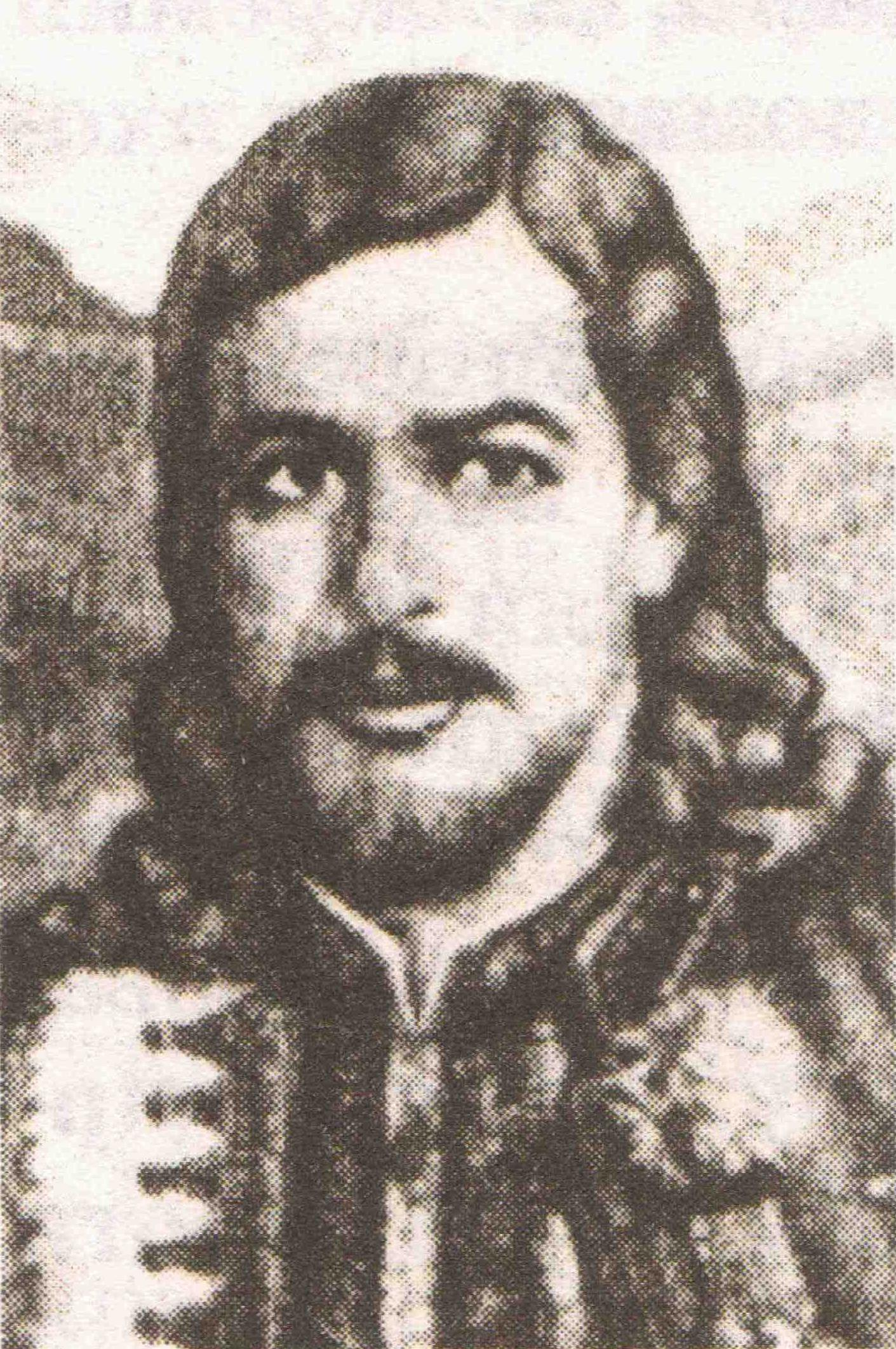

Member of the Reichstag
- In office 1848–1849

Personal details
- Born: c. 1803 or 1812 Ploska near Putyla, Austrian Empire (now Ukraine)
- Died: 24 October 1851 (aged 38–39) Solca, Austrian Empire (now Romania)
- Occupation: Political activist, farmer

Lukian Kobylytsia (also Lucian Kobylicza; Ukrainian: Лук'ян Кобилиця; Romanian: Luchian Cobiliță) (c. 1803 or 1812 – 1851) was a Ukrainian activist, political leader and farmer from the Hutsulshchyna region. He was the leader of popular uprisings in Bukovina from 1843 to 1844 and from 1848 to 1849, and a member of the Austrian Reichstag.

== Biography ==
Lukian Kobylytsia was born to serf parents in the village of Ploska near Storonets-Putyliv in the district of Vyzhnytsia, in what is now the Ukrainian Oblast of Chernivtsi. His exact date of birth is unknown, but it is estimated that Kobylytsia was born around 1803, although other sources give 1812 as his birth year. In 1839 he was elected by the farmers as their public representative. In reaction to the ban on the use of forests by villagers, in late 1843 inhabitants of 22 villages in Bukovina refused to carry out the duties imposed on them by landlords. They demanded establishment of Ukrainian schools, free access to forests and pastures and improvement of their status. In March 1844 the uprising was broken up with the help of government troops and Kobylytsia was arrested and imprisoned.

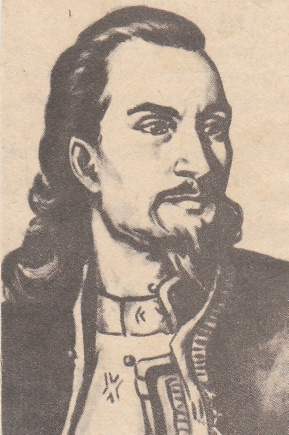
Portrait of Kobylytsia

During the March Revolution, the Bukovinian peasants elected him a member of the newly established Austrian Reichstag in Vienna, where he stood up for their interests. In the parliament Kobylytsia opposed Romanian representatives and voiced his support for local autonomy and unification of Bukovina with Galicia.

In November 1848, in response to the limited peasant reform of 1848 in Galicia, Bukovina and Transcarpathia, he led an uprising in the mountain villages of the Vyzhnytsia and Storozhynets districts. Claiming to represent the emperor, Kobylytsia organized groups of armed Hutsul peasants, who established a new order in their territories. During the uprising, forests and meadows, the ownership of which was disputed by the farmers, were confiscated by the rebels who claimed they were their property. By the end of 1848, the revolt had spread around Bukovina and in parts of Galicia, running in parallel with the simultaneous Hungarian Revolution led by Lajos Kossuth.

The uprising was suppressed by the summer of 1849, when government troops were deployed against the rebels. Kobylytsia was arrested in Zhabie in April 1850. After being freed from imprisonment in 1851, he was exiled to Solca near Gura Humorului in the north-east of modern Romania, and banned from returning to Hutsulshchyna. Kept under police surveillance, Kobylytsia died during the same year, possibly as a result of torture he had undergone in prison. According to another version, Kobylytsia was poisoned by landlords, who were afraid that in case of liberation he could lead new peasant revolts.

== Legacy ==
Kobylytsia is a popular hero in Northern Bukovina, and his name is mentioned in numerous folk songs and legends. The Ukrainian poet Yuriy Fedkovych wrote a poem entitled Lukian Kobylytsia, in which he tells the story of his life in the form of a ballad. The history of Kobylytsia's revolt was studied by numerous scholars, among them Ivan Franko. Hryhorii Miziun wrote a drama Lukian Kobylytsia in 1952.
