= Vashkivtsi urban hromada =

Urban hromada in Chernivtsi Oblast, Ukraine

Vashkivtsi urban hromada Вашківецька міська громада
- Hromada
- Interactive map of Vashkivtsi urban hromada
- Country: Ukraine
- Oblast: Chernivtsi
- Raion: Vyzhnytsia

Area
  - Total: 136.22 km^{2} (52.59 sq mi)

Population (2018)
  - Total: 11,577
  - Density: 84.988/km^{2} (220.12/sq mi)
- Settlements: 7
- Cities: 1
- Villages: 6
- Website: vashkivetska-gromada.gov.ua

Vashkivtsi urban territorial hromada (Ukrainian: Вашківецька міська територіальна громада, romanized: Vashkivetska miska terytorialna hromada) is a hromada of Ukraine, located in the western Chernivtsi Oblast. Its administrative centre is the city of Vashkivtsi.

Vyzhnytsia urban hromada has an area of 136.22 km^{2} (52.59 mi^{2}). Its population is 11,577 (as of 2018).

== Settlements ==
In addition to one city (Vashkivtsi), the hromada contains six villages:

- Babyne
- Karapchiv
- Sloboda-Banyliv
- Valy
- Voloka
- Zamostia
