= Helzel =

Ashkenazi Jewish dish

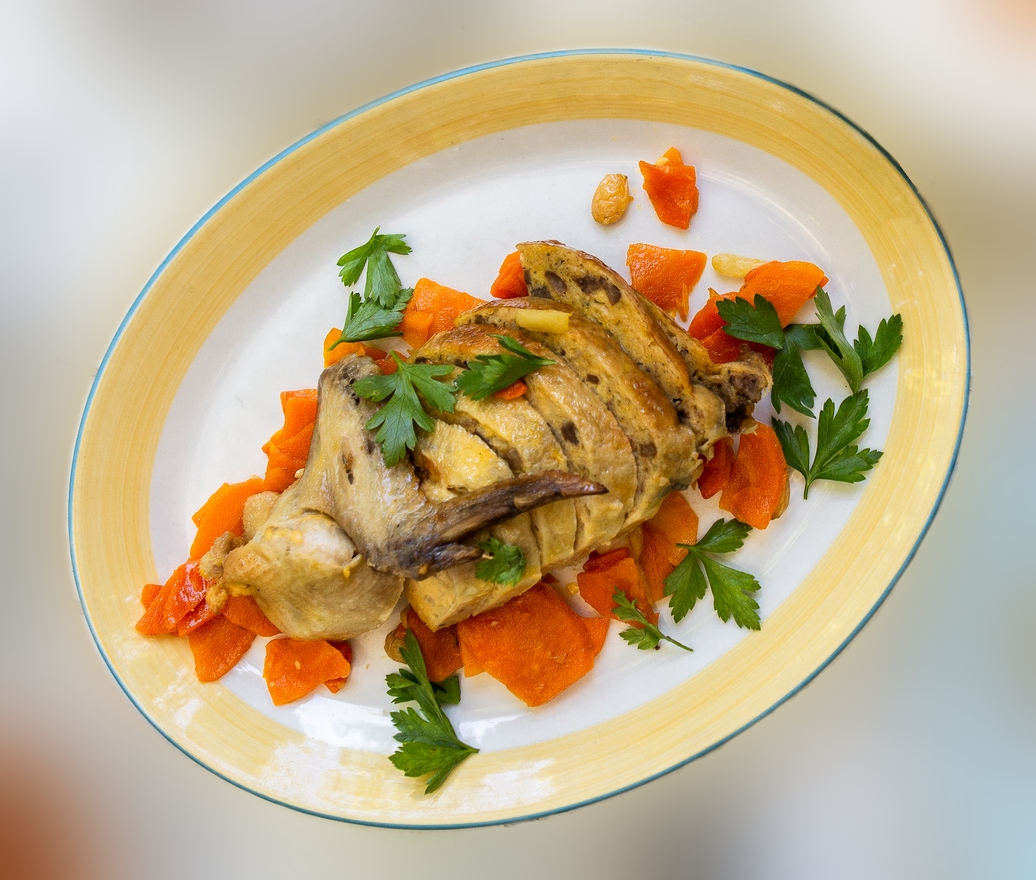
- Alternative names: Gefilte helzel, heldzl, helzele, false kishke
- Region or state: Central and Eastern Europe, Israel
- Created by: Ashkenazi Jewish communities
- Main ingredients: Chicken, flour

Helzel (Note: Also spelled heldzl or helzele) (from Yiddish: העלזעל) or gefilte helzel is an Ashkenazi Jewish dish. It is a sort of sausage made from poultry neck skin stuffed with flour, semolina, bread crumbs or matzo meal (when cooked on Passover), schmaltz, and fried onions and sewn up with a thread.

Chicken or goose necks are commonly used but duck or turkey necks can be substituted. The stuffing can also include internal meats, such as chopped heart, gizzard, liver. Sometimes the stuffing is flavored with garlic and black pepper. Helzel may be cooked in chicken soup or used as an ingredient in cholent. Because of its sausage shape and the flour-based stuffing, helzel is sometimes called "false kishke".

The name derives from Yiddish heldzl (העלדזל 'neck') which in turn stems from German Hals.

Until well into the 20th century, the dish was a comfort food of Ashkenazim typically served on Shabbat and Jewish Holidays. In the 20th and into the 21st centuries, its popularity has declined.

== Similar dishes ==
The Ashkenazi helzel bears a similarity to tebit, an Iraqi Jewish variant of hamin, which includes a whole chicken skin filled with a mixture of rice, chopped chicken meat, and herbs.

== See also ==
- List of chicken dishes
- List of sausage dishes
- List of stuffed dishes
