= Putyla =

Rural locality in Chernivtsi Oblast, Ukraine

Putyla Путила
- Rural settlement
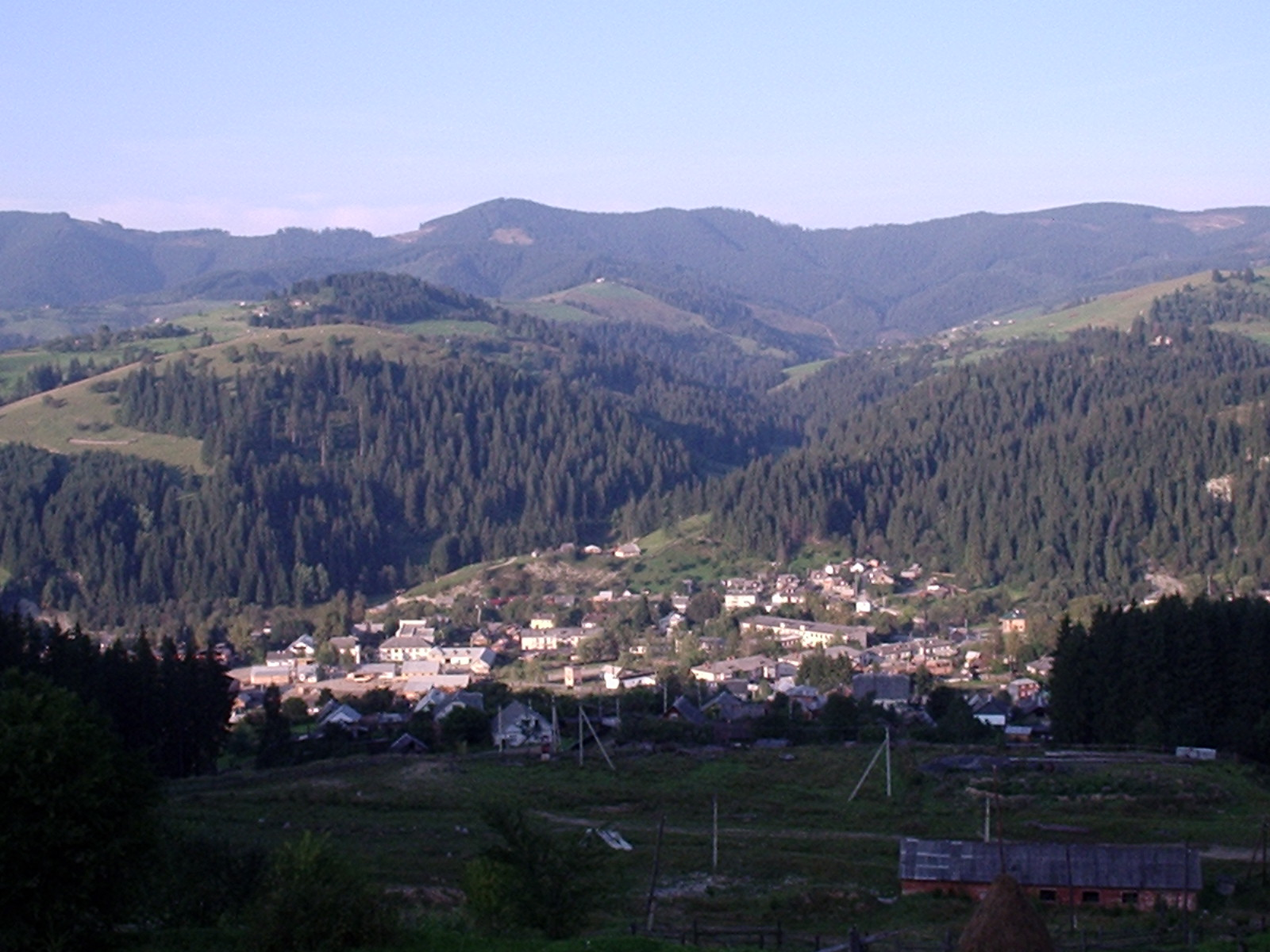
- View of the town of Putyla and the Carpathian Mountains in the background.

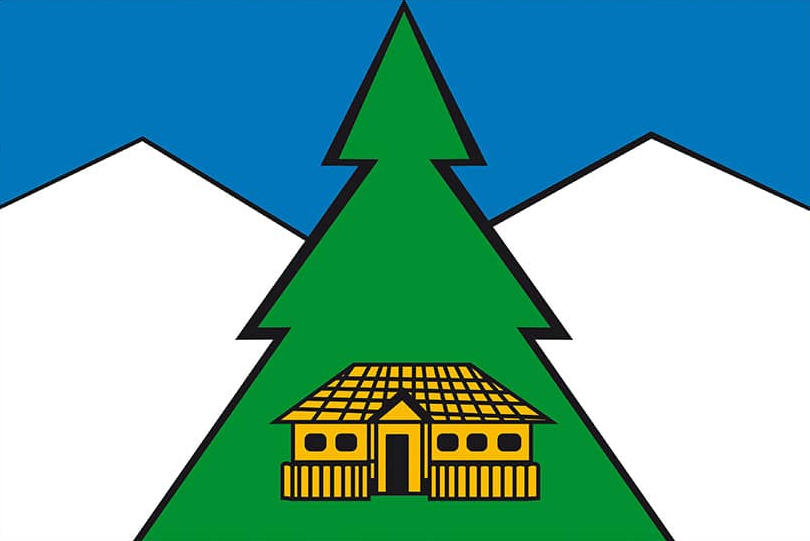
- Flag
- Interactive map of Putyla
- Location of Putyla in Ukraine Putyla (Ukraine)
- Coordinates: 47°59′43″N 25°05′44″E
- Country: Ukraine
- Oblast: Chernivtsi Oblast
- Raion: Vyzhnytsia Raion
- Hromada: Putyla settlement hromada
- First mentioned: 1501
- Town status: 1961

Government
  - Mayor: Ivan Povidash
- Elevation: 628 m (2,060 ft)

Population (2022)
  - Total: 3,374
- Time zone: UTC+2 (EET)
  - Summer (DST): UTC+3 (EEST)
- Postal code: 59102
- Area code: +380 3738
- Website: http://rada.gov.ua/

Putyla (Ukrainian: Путила; Romanian: Putila; German: Putilla Storonetz), formerly Storonets-Putyliv (Ukrainian: Сторонець-Путилів) is a rural settlement in Vyzhnytsia Raion, Chernivtsi Oblast, western Ukraine. It hosts the administration of Putyla settlement hromada, one of the hromadas of Ukraine. At the 2001 census, the town's population was 3,265. Current population: 3,374 (2022 estimate).

== History ==
The town of Putyla was first mentioned in 1501 along with other local settlements, which the Polish Crown gave to Ioan Tăutu for settling the peace between Poland and Principality of Moldavia. In 1817, the local villagers complained to Austrian Emperor Francis II that they had their taxes increased the past 10 years. In 1843, the villagers were informed that they could no longer use and cultivate the nearby forest, after which an uprising occurred, resulting in the imprisonment of 14 local leaders.

Until 18 July 2020, Putyla served as an administrative center of Putyla Raion. The raion was abolished in July 2020 as part of the administrative reform of Ukraine, which reduced the number of raions of Chernivtsi Oblast to three. The area of Putyla Raion was merged into Vyzhnytsia Raion.

Until 26 January 2024, Putyla was designated urban-type settlement. On this day, a new law entered into force which abolished this status, and Putyla became a rural settlement.
