= Vyzhnytsia Raion =

Subdivision of Chernivtsi Oblast, Ukraine

Vyzhnytsia Raion Вижницький район
- Raion
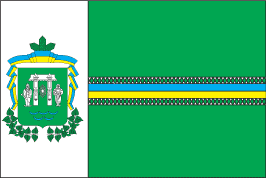
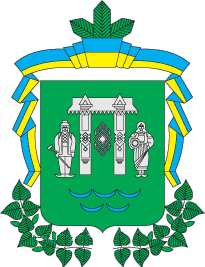
- Flag Coat of arms

- Coordinates: 48°11′14″N 25°20′16″E
- Country: Ukraine
- Oblast: Chernivtsi Oblast
- Established: 1940
- Admin. center: Vyzhnytsia
- Subdivisions: 9 hromadas

Area
  - Total: 1,896 km^{2} (732 sq mi)

Population (2022)
  - Total: 89,606
  - Density: 47.26/km^{2} (122.4/sq mi)
- Time zone: UTC+02:00 (EET)
  - Summer (DST): UTC+03:00 (EEST)
- Postal index: 592xx
- Area code: 380 3730
- Website: http://vdc.cv.ua

Vyzhnytsia Raion (Ukrainian: Вижницький район) is an administrative raion (district) in the western part of Chernivtsi Oblast, located in the historical region of Bukovina, in western Ukraine, on the Romanian border. The region has an area of 1,896 square kilometres (732 mi^{2}) and centers on the city of Vyzhnytsia. Population: 89,606 (2022 estimate).

On 18 July 2020, as part of the administrative reform of Ukraine, the number of raions of Chernivtsi Oblast was reduced to three, and the area of Vyzhnytsia Raion was significantly expanded. One abolished raion, Putyla Raion, and a part of one more abolished raion, Kitsman Raion, were merged into Vyzhnytsia Raion. The January 2020 estimate of the raion population was 55,095 (2020 est.).

== Subdivisions ==
=== Current ===
After the reform in July 2020, the raion consisted of 9 hromadas:

- Banyliv rural hromada with the administration in the selo of Banyliv, retained from Vyzhnytsia Raion;
- Berehomet settlement hromada with the administration in the rural settlement of Berehomet, retained from Vyzhnytsia Raion;
- Brusnytsia rural hromada with the administration in the selo of Brusnytsia, transferred from Kitsman Raion;
- Koniatyn rural hromada with the administration in the selo of Koniatyn, transferred from Putyla Raion;
- Putyla settlement hromada with the administration in the rural settlement of Putyla, transferred from Putyla Raion;
- Seliatyn rural hromada with the administration in the selo of Seliatyn, transferred from Putyla Raion;
- Ust-Putyla rural hromada with the administration in the selo of Ust-Putyla, transferred from Putyla Raion;
- Vashkivtsi urban hromada with the administration in the city of Vashkivtsi, retained from Vyzhnytsia Raion;
- Vyzhnytsia urban hromada with the administration in the city of Vyzhnytsia, retained from Vyzhnytsia Raion.

=== Before 2020 ===
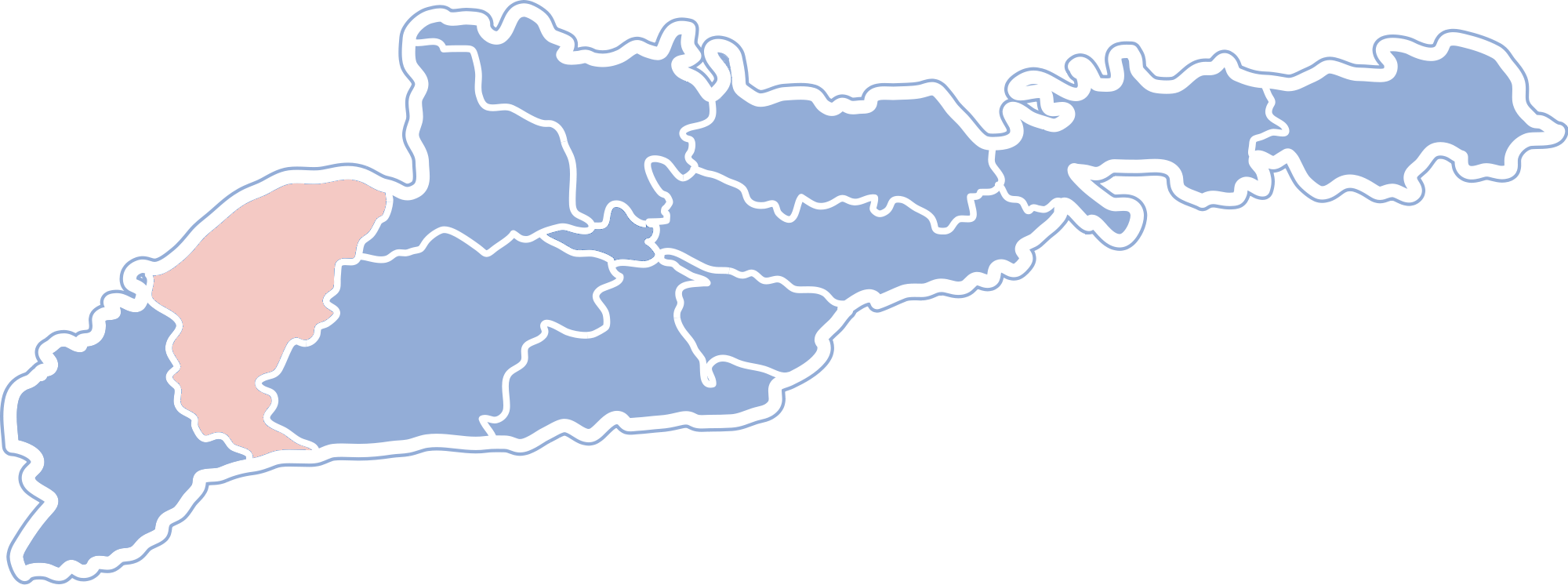
Vyzhnytsia Raion in Chernivtsi Oblast (1966-2020)

Before the 2020 reform, the raion consisted of four hromadas:

- Banyliv rural hromada with the administration in Banyliv;
- Berehomet settlement hromada with the administration in Berehomet;
- Vashkivtsi urban hromada with the administration in Vashkivtsi;
- Vyzhnytsia urban hromada with the administration in Vyzhnytsia.

== See also ==
- Subdivisions of Ukraine
