= Valea Neagră (Siret) =

- Location within Romania

Location
- Country: Romania
- Counties: Neamț County
- Villages: Bălănești, Budești, Dulcești, Trifești

Physical characteristics
- Mouth: Siret
  - coordinates: 46.8290°N 26.9096°E
- Length: 46 km (29 mi)
- Basin size: 300 km^{2} (120 sq mi)

Basin features
- Progression: Siret→ Danube→ Black Sea
- Tributaries
  - left: Velnița, Ruginoasa, Brițcani
  - right: Inăria, Românești, Sârbi

The Valea Neagră is a right tributary of the river Siret in Romania. It discharges into the Siret near Hârlești. Its length is 46 km (29 mi) and its basin size 300 km^{2} (120 sq mi).
