= Hurmuzachi =

Noble Romanian family

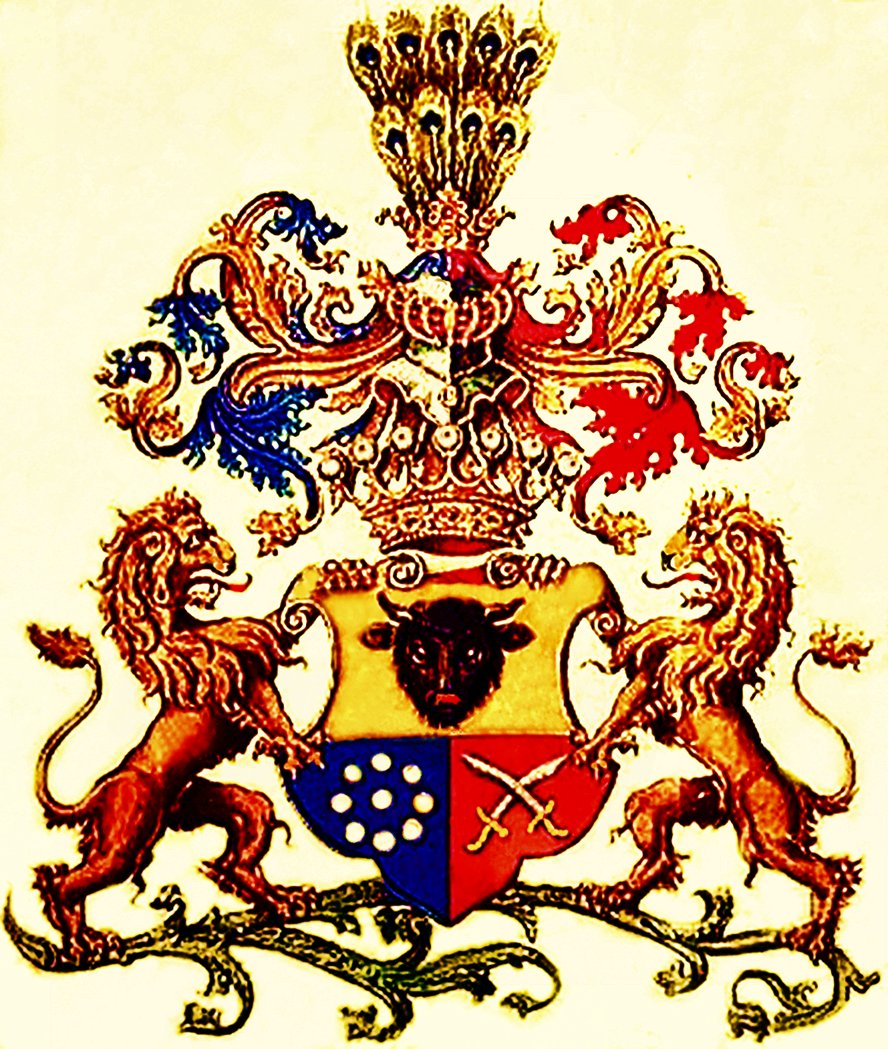
Coat of arms of Barons Hurmuzachi

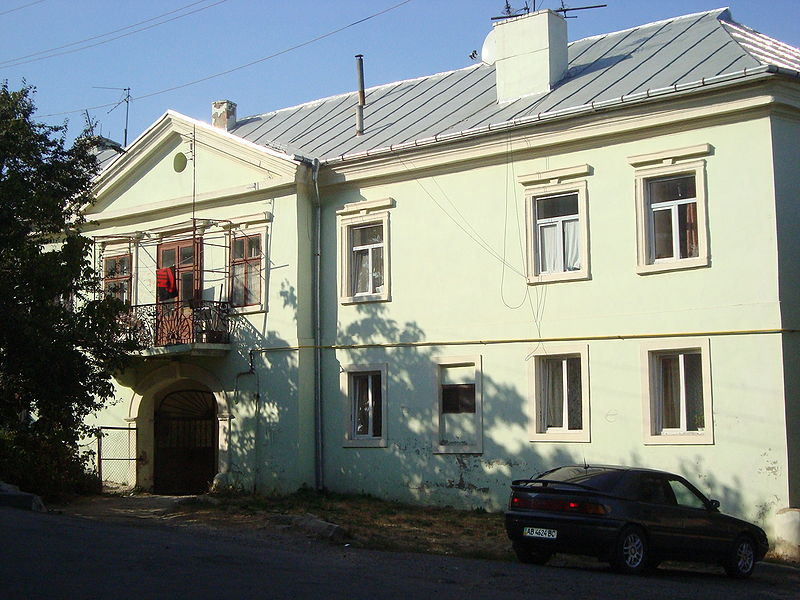
Hurmuzachi palace

The Hurmuzachi family (Hurmuzaki, Hurmuzache) is a Romanian noble family of Greek origin, whose members were noted politicians, jurists and historians in the Duchy of Bukovina and held the title of Baron in the Austro-Hungarian Empire. During the 17th-19th centuries they were associated with the Cernăuca estate in Bukovina.

== History ==
The most prominent members were the Hurmuzachi brothers. Their father was Doxachi Hurmuzachi (d. April 1857), who eventually re-acquired Cernăuca after the documents of the ownership of the estate by the family had been lost and built a new boier palace and church and planted park there. Doxaki married Iuliana (Ilinka, Olena) Murguleț (d.1858), daughter of a Romanian boier (stolnic), and they had 12 children, of whom 7 survived: the five brothers and two sisters, Eufrozina and Eliza.

Doxaki was son of Constantin Hurmuzachi, who held the rank of medelnicer, and his wife, Roksana (d. August 12, 1818), both from the Principality of Moldavia.

== Notable members ==
- Constantin (1811–1869)
- Eudoxiu (1812–1878)
- Gheorghe (1817–1882)
- Alexandru (1823–1871)
- Nicolae (1826–1909)

== Gallery ==
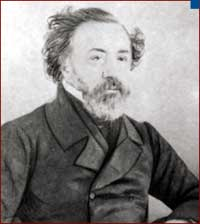
Constantin Hurmuzachi

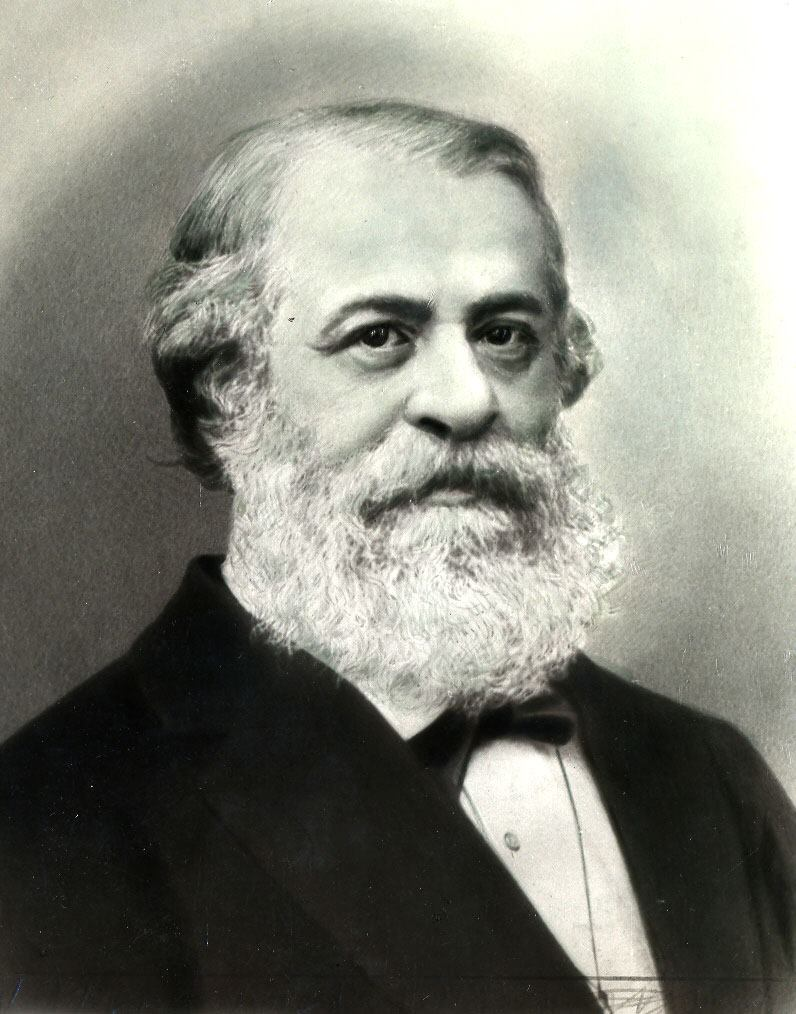
Eudoxiu Hurmuzachi

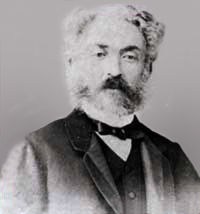
Alexandru Hurmuzachi

== See also ==
- Hurmuzaki Psalter (Psaltirea Hurmuzaki), earliest manuscript in the Romanian language
- Anatol Hurmuzaki (b. 1937), academician, governmental functionary of Moldova (chief of the department of mechanization, state technical control and labour protection, Ministry of Agriculture of Moldova & other positions)
