= Românești (river) =

- Location within Romania

Location
- Country: Romania
- Counties: Neamț County
- Villages: Climești, Miron Costin, Trifești

Physical characteristics
- Mouth: Valea Neagră
  - location: Trifești
  - coordinates: 46.9024°N 26.8433°E
- Length: 13 km (8.1 mi)
- Basin size: 28 km^{2} (11 sq mi)

Basin features
- Progression: Valea Neagră→ Siret→ Danube→ Black Sea
- River code: XII.1.42.4

The Românești is a right tributary of the river Valea Neagră in Romania. It flows into the Valea Neagră in Trifești. Its length is 13 km (8.1 mi) and its basin size is 28 km^{2} (11 sq mi).
