= Baratca =

Baratca may refer to several places in Romania:

- Barațca, a village in Păuliș Commune, Arad County
- Baratca, a village in Bârgăuani Commune, Neamț County
