= Vlădiceni =

Vlădiceni may refer to several villages:

- Vlădiceni, a village in Tomești Commune, Iași County, Romania
- Vlădiceni, a village in Bârgăuani Commune, Neamț County, Romania
- Vlădiceni, a Romanian name of the village of Vladychen, Odesa Oblast, Ukraine
