= Climești =

Climești may refer to several villages in Romania:

- Climești, a village in Berești-Bistrița Commune, Bacău County
- Climești, a village in Făurei Commune, Neamț County
