= Barátka =

Barátka is the Hungarian name for two communes in Romania:

- Bratca Commune, Bihor County
- Baratca village, Bârgăuani Commune, Neamţ County
