= Religion and ritual of the Cucuteni–Trypillia culture =

Prehistoric religion

The study of the religion and ritual of the Cucuteni-Trypillia culture has provided important insights into the early history of Europe. The Cucuteni–Trypillia culture inhabited the present-day southeastern European nations of Moldova, Romania, and Ukraine during the Neolithic and Copper Ages (c. 5500–2750 BC). It left behind many settlement ruins that contain archaeological artifacts attesting to their cultural and technological characteristics.

Religious artifacts from domestic homes and sacred sanctuaries, some intentionally buried within the sanctuary, provide evidence of the society's beliefs, rituals, and social structure. Some are clay figurines or statues, many of which archaeologists have identified as akin to fetishes or totems, and are believed to be imbued with powers that could help and protect the people who care for them. Many clay figurines have been discovered at Cucuteni–Trypillia sites, and many museums in eastern Europe host sizable collections of them. Popularly but inaccurately known as "goddesses", the figurines have become a recognizable visual marker of the culture.

== Artifacts ==
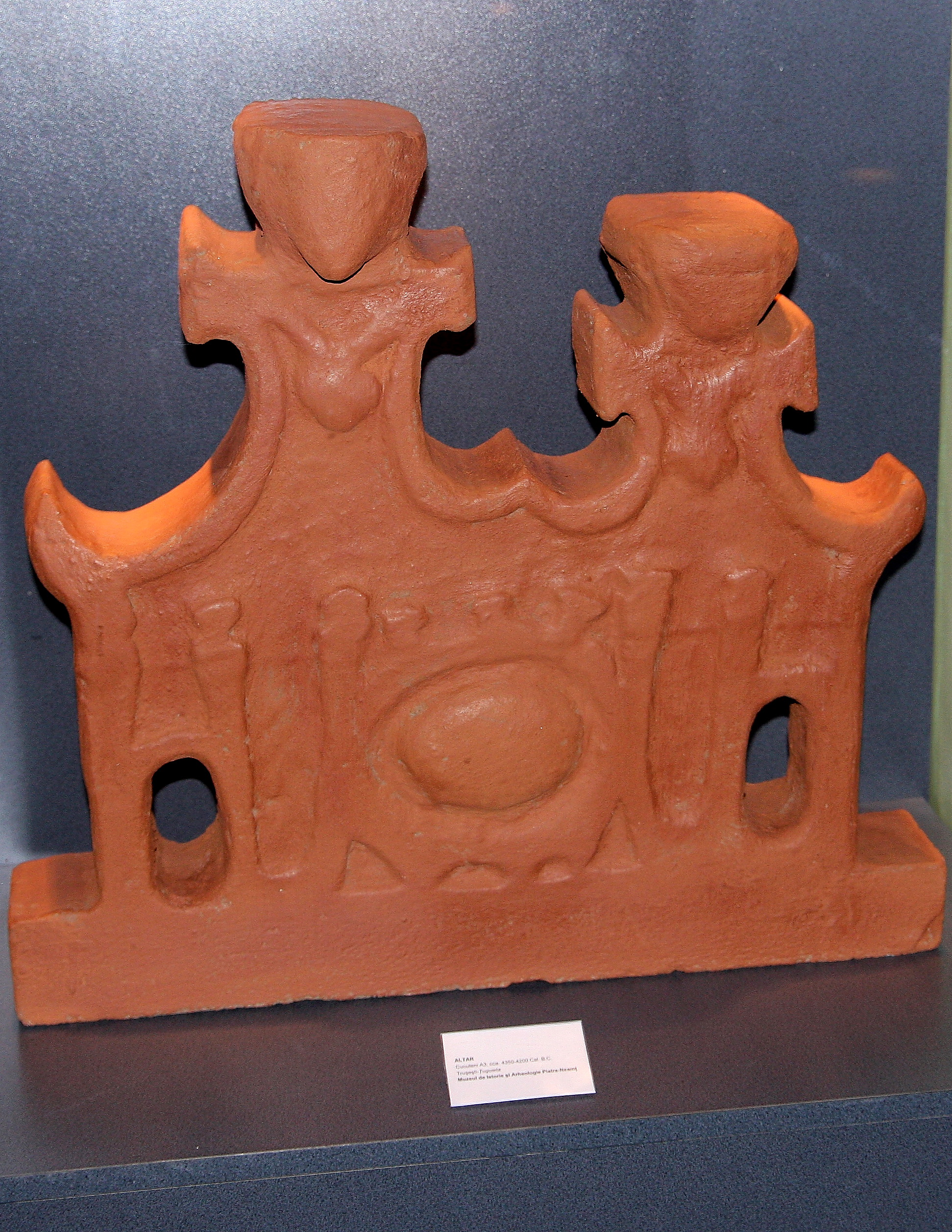
Cucuteni shrine (replica)

In the Precucuteni III period (c. 4800–4600 BC), special communal sanctuary buildings began to appear in Cucuteni–Trypillia settlements. They continued to exist during the Cucuteni A and Cucuteni A/B (corresponding to Trypillia B) periods (c. 4600–3800 BC). The sanctuaries began to disappear in the Cucuteni B (Trypillia C) period (c. 3800–3500 BC); only a few examples have been discovered in archaeological exploration. The architectural style of the sanctuaries was monumental, and inside the sanctuaries were stelae, statues, shrines, and other ceremonial and religious artifacts, sometimes packed in straw inside pottery.

Some of the artifacts originally seemed to have chthonic or heavenly themes. During an excavation in 1973 at the Cucuteni–Trypillia site at Ghelăiești near the city of Neamț, Romania, archaeologist Ștefan Cucoș discovered the community sanctuary, a house in the center of the settlement. The following account, written by Croatian archaeologist Marina Hoti, describes the findings within the sanctuary:

In the southeast corner of the house a vase surrounded by six vases was found under the floor. The central vase was turned upside down, covering another vessel with a lid, in which four anthropomorphic figurines were found, arranged in a cross and looking to the four sides of the world. Two figurines were decorated with lines and had completely black heads and legs; the other two were not coloured, but they had traces of ocher red.

Subsequent analysis of this discovery has led to a number of interpretations by various scholars over the years. Cucos included other symbols discovered at Ghelăiești, including serpentine depictions, the cross-shape of altars, and swastika designs. He concluded that it was associated with a ritual of fertility dedicated to the Goddess, associating the black-painted figurines with chthonic themes and the red ocher-painted figurines with celestial or heavenly themes.

Later analysis of the discovery incorporated the entire setting in which these painted figurines were found, specifically that they were buried under an upturned ceramic vessel. Scholars compared this find with other similar discoveries from contemporary cultures in Isaiia and Poduri, and developed a theory that the tableau, being buried beneath the floor of the sanctuary with the four figurines facing outward to the four cardinal directions, represented a means to protect the sanctuary and settlement from evil. The black heads of the figurines were associated with death, and the red ocher was painted on the figurines on the precise body parts that the Cucuteni–Trypillia culture painted on the body parts of their dead before burial. They concluded that these figurines most likely represented departed souls or beings from the underworld (land of the dead); by enclosing them in an overturned vessel and burying this entire arrangement under the floor of the sanctuary, they protected the settlement from the evil influences these figurines represented by creating a magical sigil of protection.

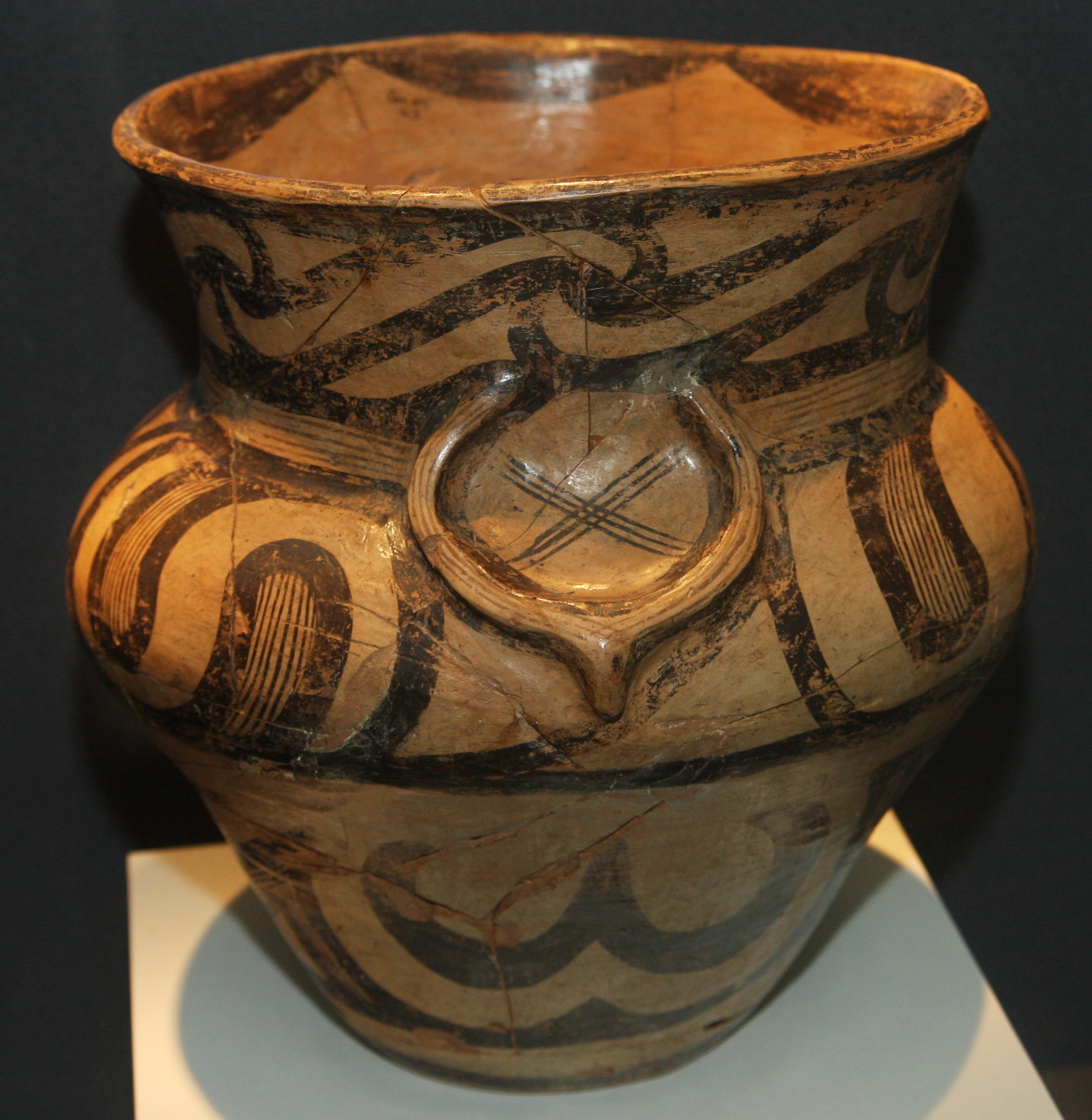
Masculine cross design

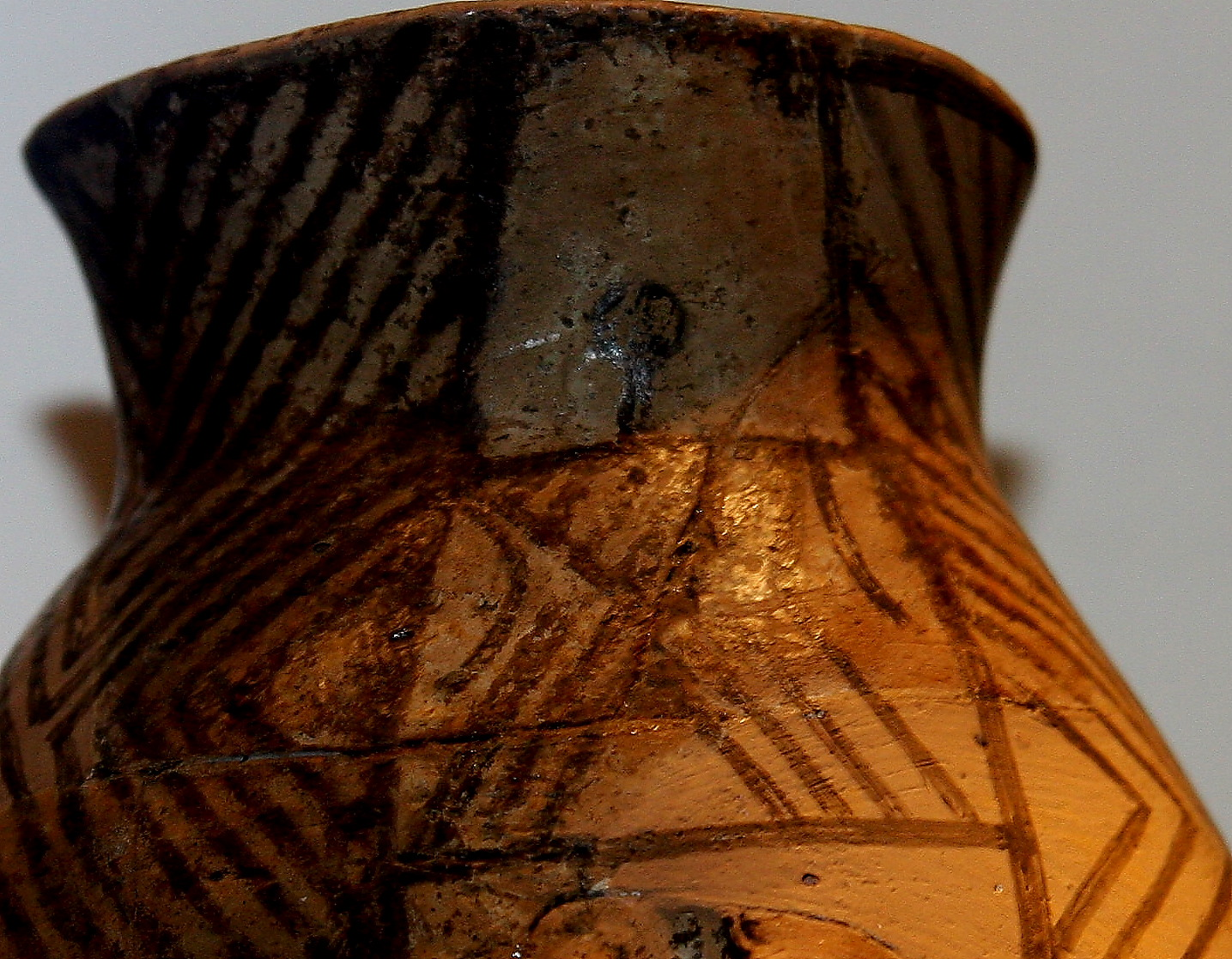
Hourglass design

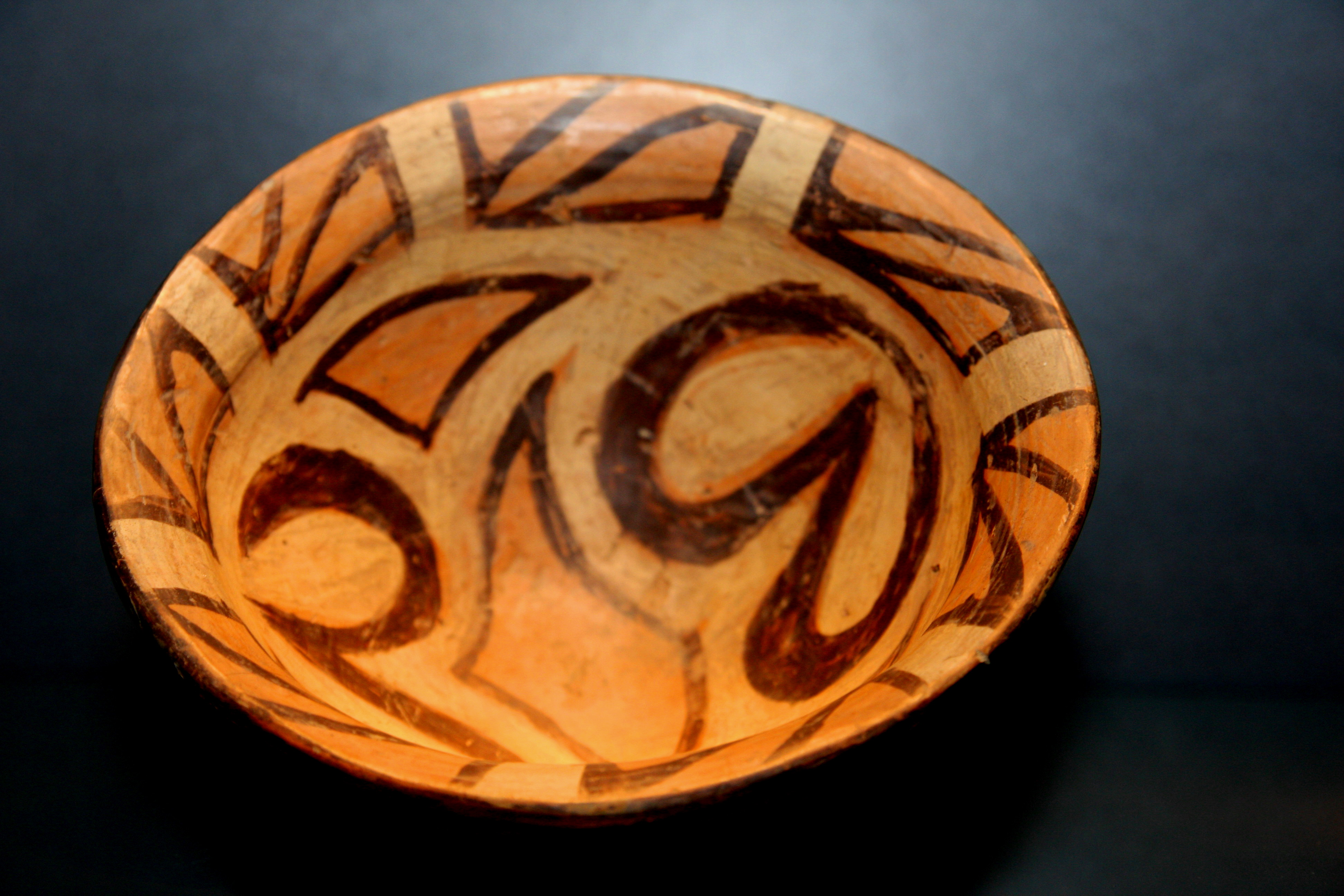
Masculine bull horn design

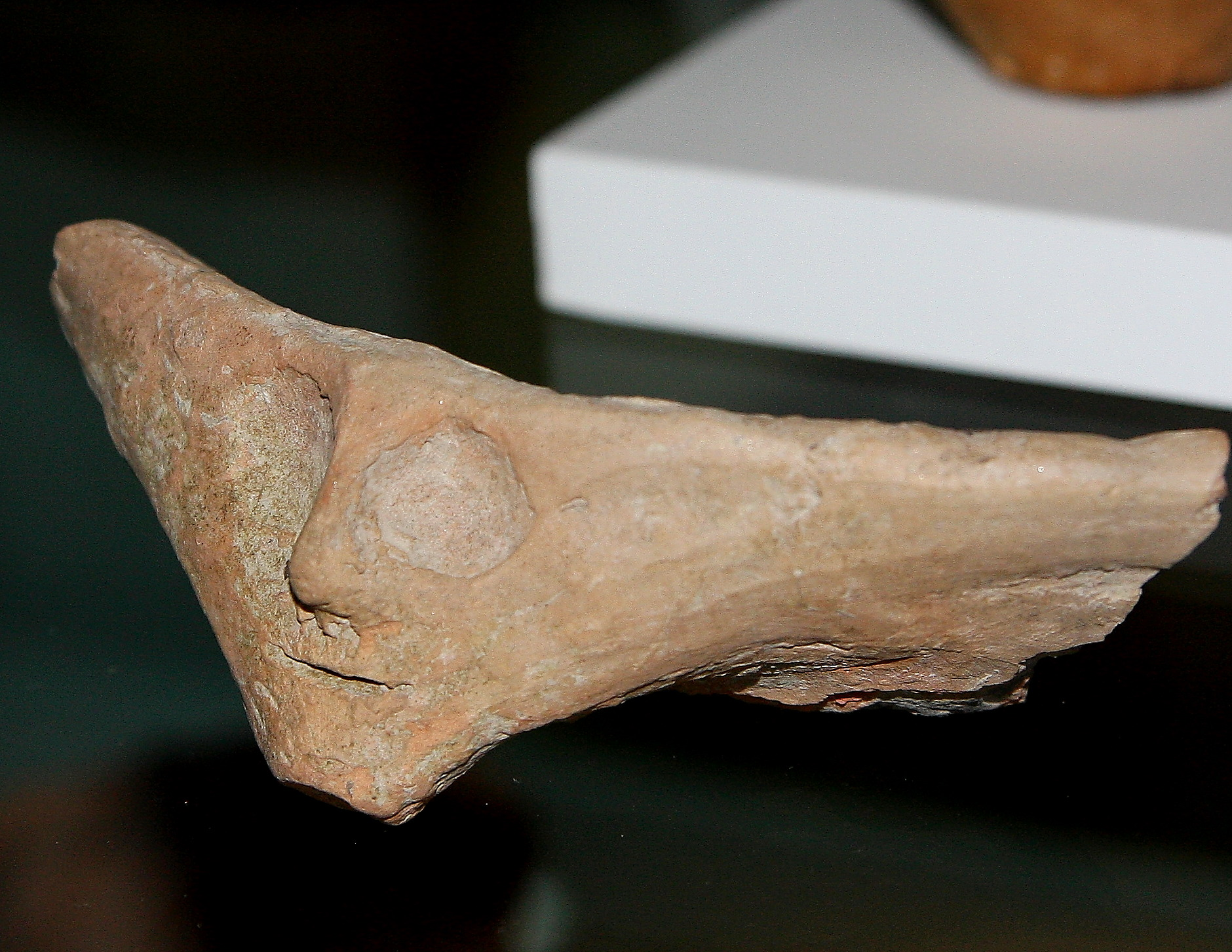
Anthropomorphic figure

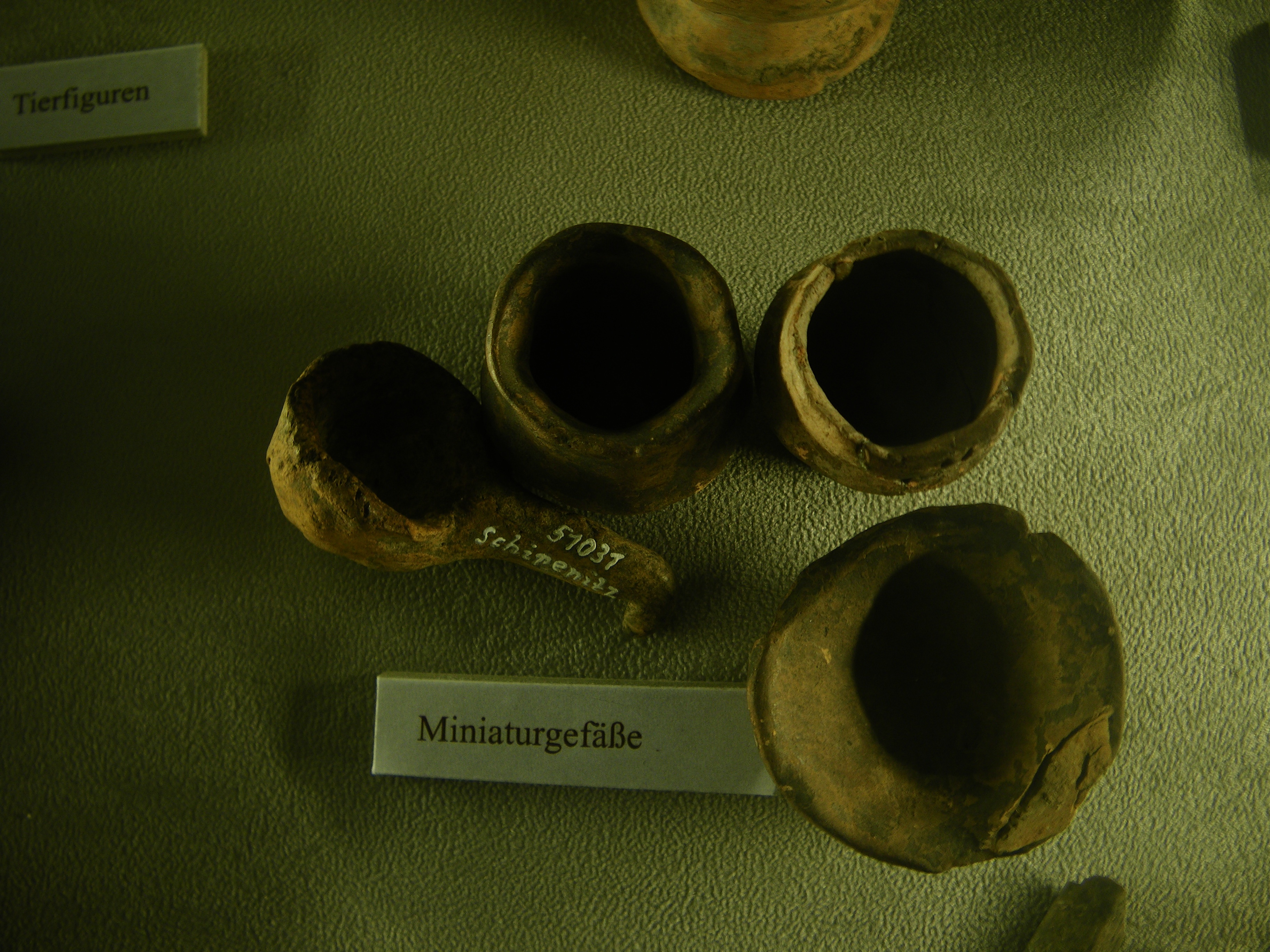
Miniature pottery

== Mother Goddess figurines ==
As evidence from archaeology, thousands of artifacts from Neolithic Europe have been discovered, mostly in the form of female figurines, and a goddess theory was formulated. The leading historian was Marija Gimbutas, whose interpretation is the subject of great controversy in archaeology due to the fact that this theory still lacks clear archaeological evidence to support it.

Some researchers think that the symbols used for representing femininity are the rhombus for fertility and the triangle for fecundity. The cross, symbolizing nature's power of fertility and renewal, was sometimes used to represent masculinity as well as the phases of the moon.

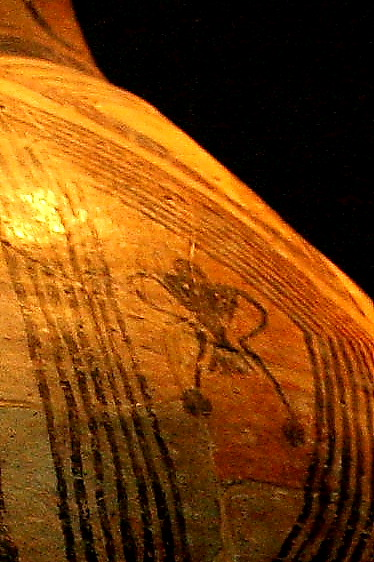
Goddess design on ceramic pot

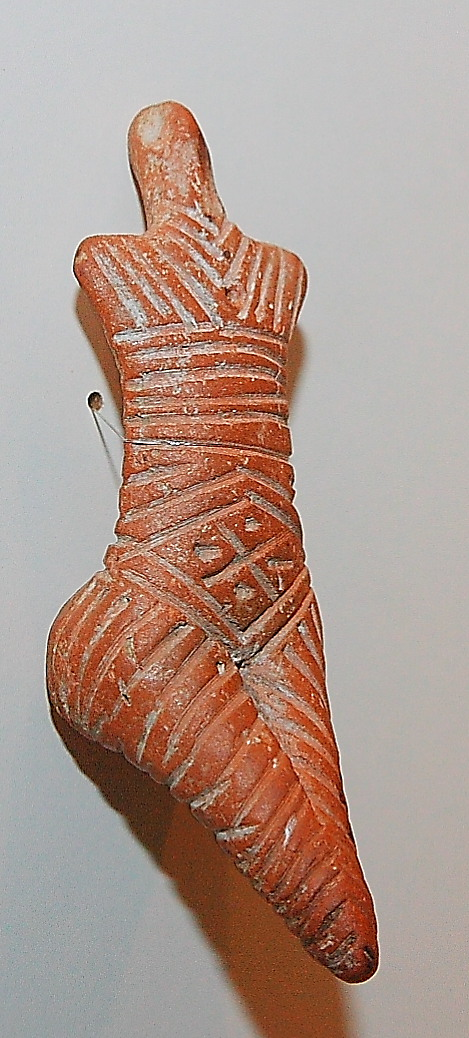
Rhombus design used as a symbol for fertility

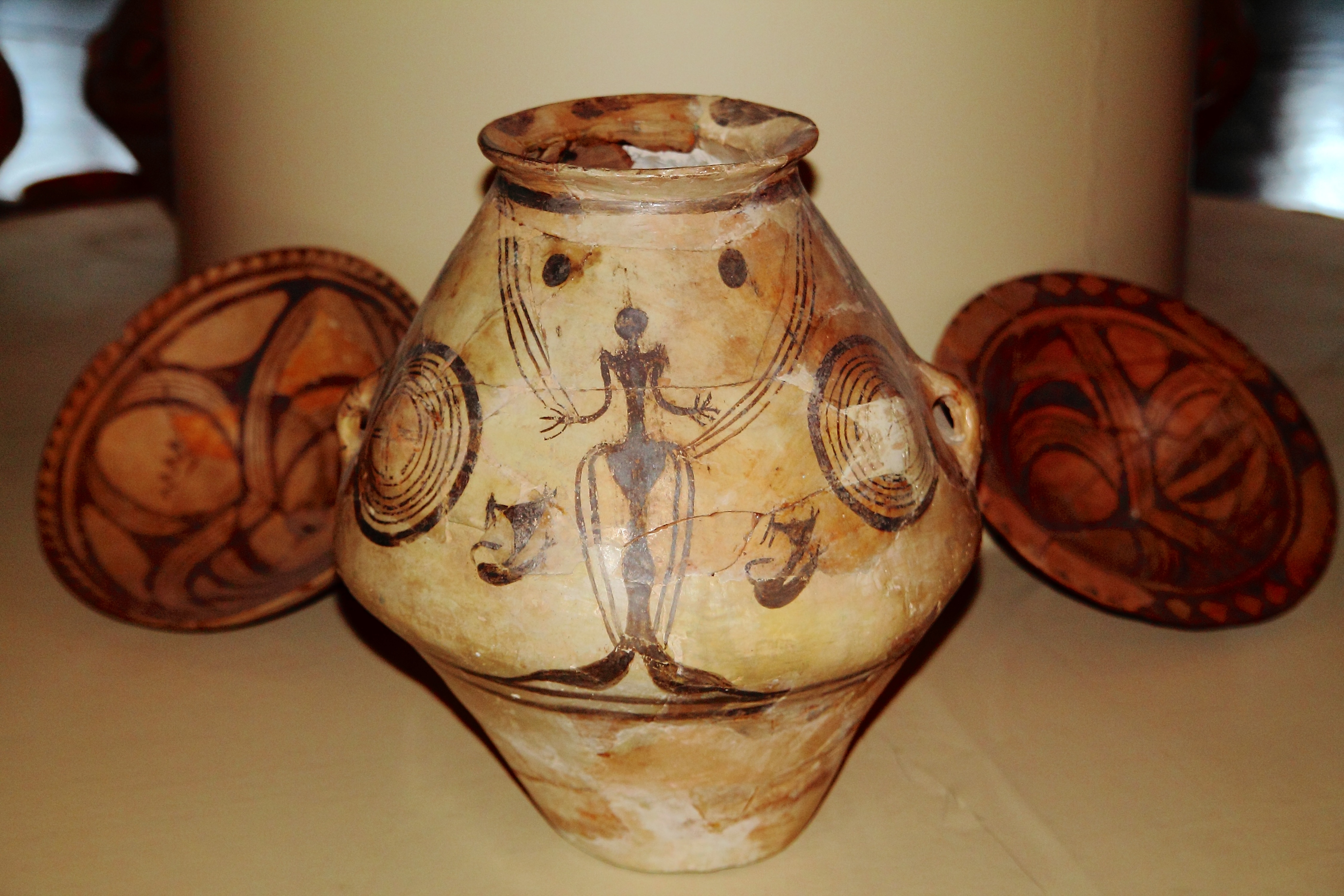
Goddess representation

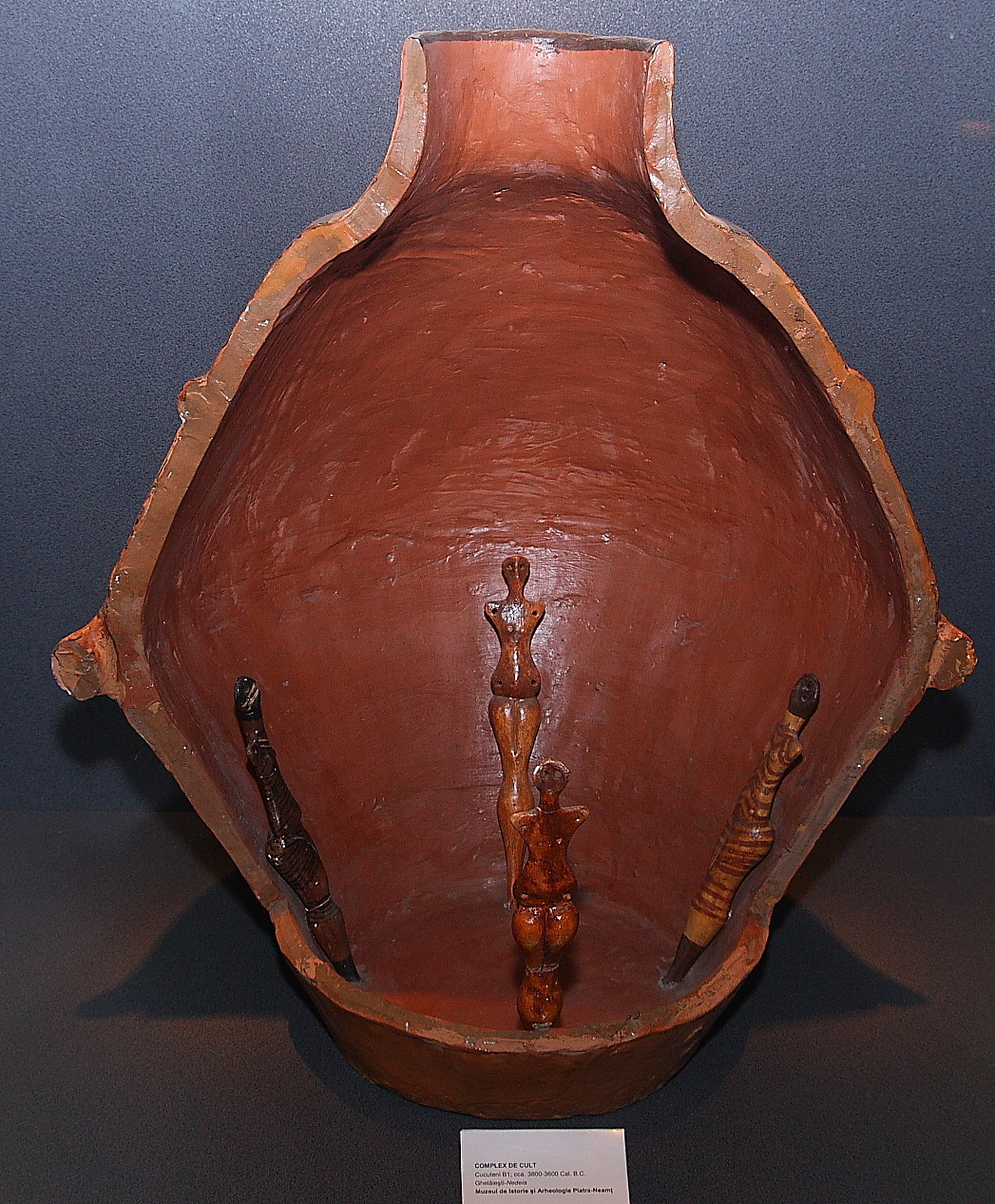
Ritual vessel discovered at Ghelăești containing four clay figurines

Cutaway diagram of the vessel

== Funerary rites ==
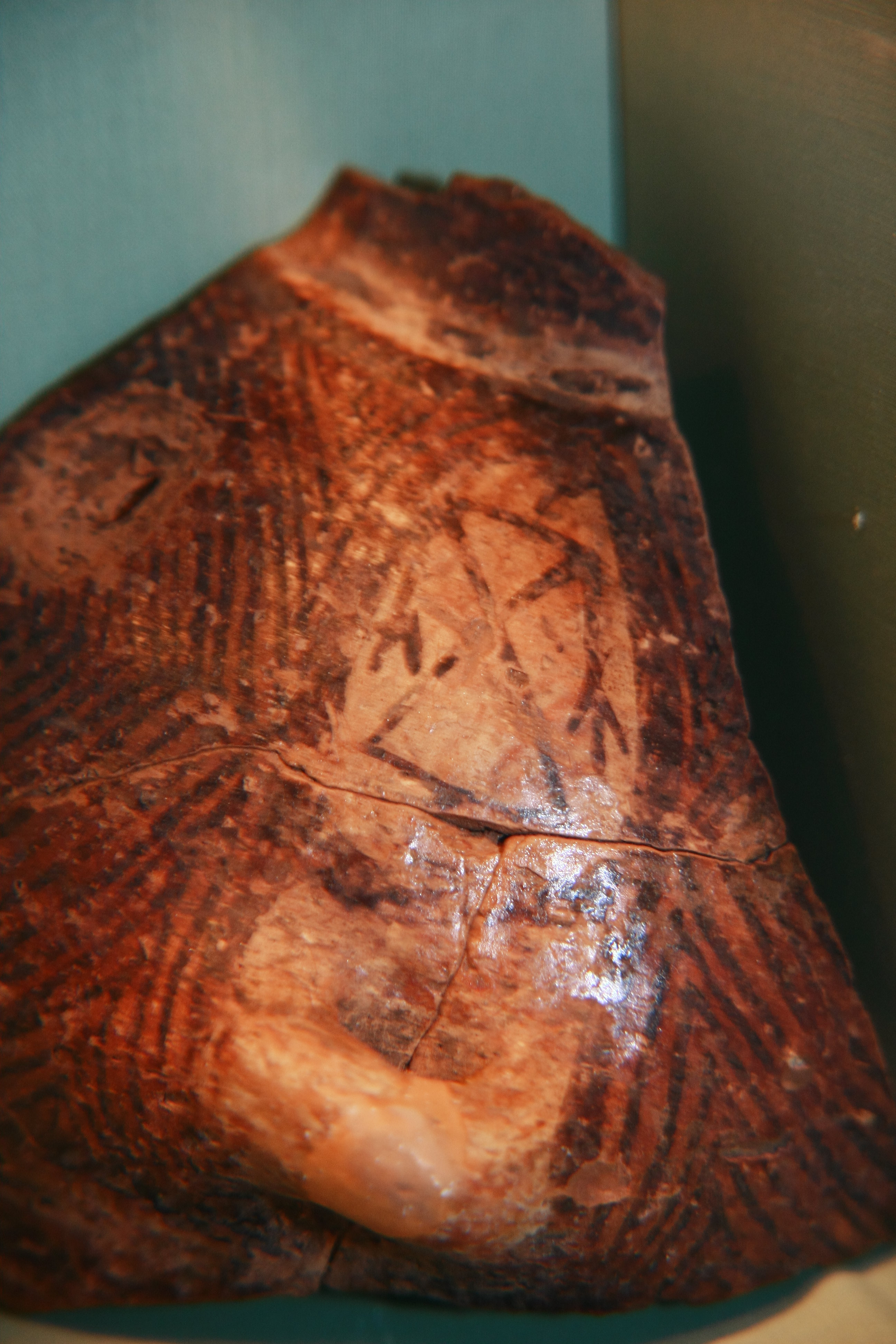
Goddess with the double triangle (hourglass) design and "bird hands".

One of the unanswered questions regarding the Cucuteni–Trypillia culture is the small number of artifacts associated with funerary rites. Although very large settlements have been explored by archaeologists, there is little evidence of mortuary activity. American archaeologist Douglass W. Bailey makes a distinction between the eastern Tripolye and the western Cucuteni regions of the Cucuteni–Trypillia geographical area, writing, "There are no Cucuteni cemeteries and the Tripolye ones that have been discovered are very late."

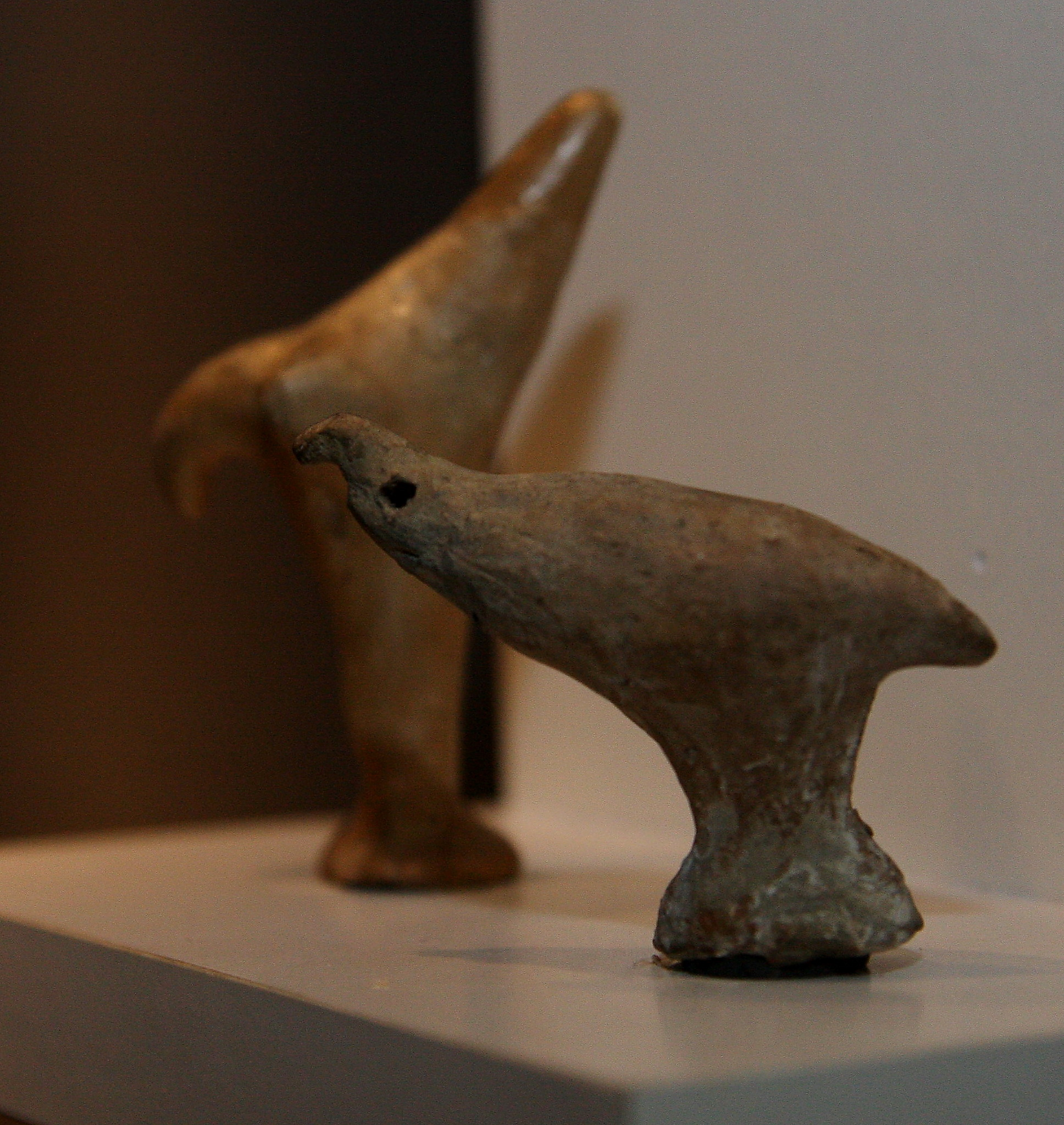
Bird Goddesses

Some historians have contrasted the funerary practices of the Cucuteni–Trypillia culture with the neighboring Linear Pottery culture, which existed from 5500 to 4500 BC in the region of present-day Hungary and extending westward into central Europe, coinciding with the Precucuteni to Cucuteni A Phases. Archaeological evidence from the Linear Pottery sites have shown that these cultures practiced cremation and inhumation (or burial). However, there appears to have been a distinction made in the Linear-Pottery culture on where the bodies were interred based on gender and social dominance. Females and children were found buried beneath the floor of the house, while men were missing, indicating some other practice was associated with how they dealt with the dead bodies of males. One of the conclusions drawn from this evidence was espoused by Gimbutas. In The Civilization of the Goddess: The World of Old Europe, she theorizes that women and children were associated with hearth and home and would therefore be buried beneath it as an act of connecting their bodies to the home.

Collectively taking these characteristics of the neighboring Linear Pottery culture into consideration, scholars theorized that additional Cucuteni–Tryilian sites may be found, including locations that may be detached from the main settlements where there may be evidence of the practice of cremation. Archaeologists have discussed broadening the search areas around known Cucuteni–Trypillia settlements to cover a much wider area and to employ modern techniques in order to find evidence of outlying sites where evidence of funerary activities was found.

In addition to cremation and burial, other possible methods of disposing of the bodies of the dead have been suggested. Romanian archaeologists Silvia Marinescu-Bîlcu and Alexandra Bolomey suggest a common practice of abandoning the body to the mercy of Mother Nature, a practice that may be somewhat similar to the Zoroastrian tradition of placing the bodies of the dead on top of a Tower of Silence (or Dakhma), which are then fed upon by carrion birds.

In 1960, Russian archaeologist Tamara Grigorevna Movsha proposed a theory to explain the absence of some bones. According to her theory, some bones were considered to have magical powers and were purposely scattered across the settlement.

Others have suggested the practices of cannibalism (also known as anthrophagy), or excarnation, which is the practice of removing the flesh and organs of the dead, leaving only the bones. Romanian archaeologist Sergiu Haimovici writes about such a discovery:

...Alexandra Bolomey...made a review of a series of...human remains, (and) found...at least partly, (that) they have a cultic character and maybe even...an antropophagy [sic] of (a) cultic type.

This would indicate that perhaps some ritualistic cannibalism was practiced among the Cucuteni–Trypillia tribes.

The only conclusion that can be drawn from archeological evidence is that, in the vast majority of cases in the Cucuteni–Trypillia culture, the bodies were not formally deposited within the settlement area.

In Poduri Dealul Ghindaru, Romania, one of the few sites where researchers have found a significant number of human remains, analysis determined that children and infants could have been inhumed either near or under the house floor in early Cucuteni culture.

== Cremation ==
Researchers have presented various hypotheses for Cucuteni rituals:

- Incineration of Cucuteni-Trypillya houses, most probable associated with interment and immolation.
- Sacrificial burials of entire animals or their heads or parts under houses or on settlement, possibly associated with immolation ceremony.
- Burial (by interment) of human skulls and bones (sometimes burnt) with stock under dwellings or on settlement, possibly also associated with immolation.

Some researchers argue that binocular vessels and anthropomorphous and zoomorphous clay figurines were used in some rituals.

== See also ==
- Chalcolithic Europe
- Neolithic Europe
- Neolithic religion
- Prehistoric Romania
- Prehistory of Southeastern Europe
- Prehistoric Ukraine
