= Dulcești =

- Commune
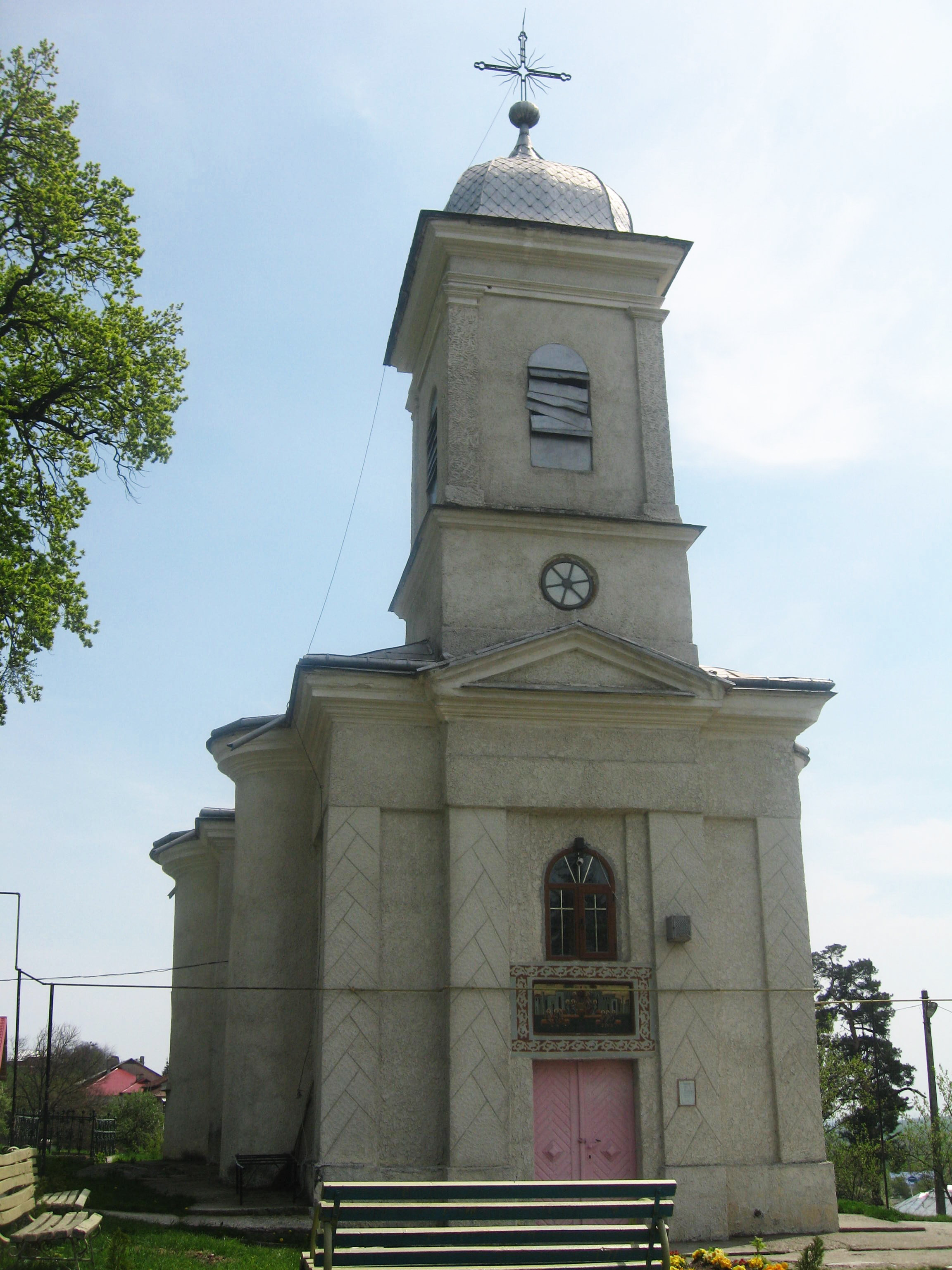
- Church of the Descent of the Holy Spirit in Dulcești

- Location in Neamț County

- Location in Romania
- Coordinates: 46.9672°N 26.7925°E
- Country: Romania
- County: Neamț

Government
  - Mayor (2020–2024): Gheorghe Nahoi (PSD)
- Area: 52.80 km^{2} (20.39 sq mi)
- Elevation: 221 m (725 ft)
- Population (2021-12-01): 2,096
  - Density: 39.70/km^{2} (102.8/sq mi)
- Time zone: UTC+02:00 (EET)
  - Summer (DST): UTC+03:00 (EEST)
- Postal code: 617175
- Area code: +(40) 233
- Vehicle reg.: NT
- Website: comunadulcesti.ro

Dulcești is a commune in Neamț County, Western Moldavia, Romania. It is composed of six villages: Brițcani, Cârlig, Corhana, Dulcești, Poiana, and Roșiori.

The commune is situated on the Moldavian Plateau, at an altitude of 221 m (725 ft), on the right bank of the Moldova River. It is located in the eastern part of Neamț County, 14 km (8.7 mi) northwest of Roman and 35 km (22 mi) east of the county seat, Piatra Neamț, and neighbors the following communes: Botești and Gherăești to the north, Făurei and Trifești to the south, Cordun to the east, and Ruginoasa to the west. Dulcești is crossed by national road DN15D, which connects Piatra Neamț to Vaslui.

Historical population
Year	Pop.	±%
2002	2,752	—
2011	2,293	−16.7%
2021	2,096	−8.6%
Source: Census data

== People ==
- Vasile Groapă (born 1955), a heavyweight weightlifter, was born in Cârlig.
- Brothers Alexandru and Constantin Hurmuzachi are buried in the courtyard of the Descent of the Holy Spirit Church.
