= Koroviia =

Commune in Chernivtsi Oblast, Ukraine

Coordinates: 48.2261°N 25.9708°E

Flag of the village of Koroviia

Koroviia (Ukrainian: Коровія; Romanian: Corovia) is a commune (selsoviet) in Chernivtsi Raion, Chernivtsi Oblast, Ukraine. It is composed of a single village, Koroviia. It belongs to Chernivtsi urban hromada, one of the hromadas of Ukraine. Population: 9,376 (2020 est.)

Until 18 July 2020, Koroviia belonged to Hlyboka Raion. The raion was abolished in July 2020 as part of the administrative reform of Ukraine, which reduced the number of raions of Chernivtsi Oblast to three. The area of Hlyboka Raion was merged into Chernivtsi Raion.

According to the 2001 Ukrainian census, the majority of the population of the commune (2,992 people in total) spoke Ukrainian (68.15%, or 2,039 people), with a minority of Romanian speakers (31.12%, out of which 4.98% called the language Romanian, or 149 people, and 26.14%, or 782 people, called it "Moldovan") and Russian speakers (0.6%, or 18 people). According to the 1989 Soviet census, out of 2,642 individuals, there were 1,272 Moldovans (63.95%), 204 Romanians (10.26%), 1,100 Ukrainians (41.63%) and 48 Russians (1.82%). In the locality, a suburb of the city of Chernivtsi, a large number of rich ethnic Ukrainians have settled, and this partly explains the increase in the proportion of ethnic Ukrainians and Ukrainian-speakers, but so does Ukrainization.
