= Constantin Hurmuzachi =

Romanian lawyer and politician

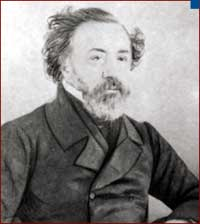

Constantin D. Hurmuzachi (November 12, 1811 – February 15, 1869) was a Romanian lawyer and politician.

The son of Doxachi Hurmuzachi and one of the Hurmuzachi brothers, he was born on the family estate in Cernăuca. This was located in the Duchy of Bukovina near Cernăuți, where he attended primary school. He then studied law at the University of Vienna, graduating in 1834. In 1844, he settled in Iași, the capital of Moldavia, becoming a prominent lawyer. Together with his brother Alexandru, he collected archival documents at Chișinău and Odesa regarding the history of the Romanians. In 1850 he joined the committee for reorganizing public education, followed by the legal reform committee in 1852. For his work there, which led to a law code and a school charter, he was made Aga.

A supporter of the union of the Principalities, he represented Roman in the Moldavian Ad hoc Divan. He was twice Minister of Justice in the new union state and deputy in the legislative assemblies of 1860 and 1861. In 1867, he was elected to the Assembly of Deputies in what was by now called Romania. The same year, he helped pass a law on concessions for building railways.

He died in Vienna at age 67 and was buried at Dulcești, Neamț County next to his brother Alexandru, in the courtyard of the Descent of the Holy Spirit Church. Streets in Constanța and Sibiu are named after him.
