= Păltiniș, Botoșani =

Păltiniș
- Commune
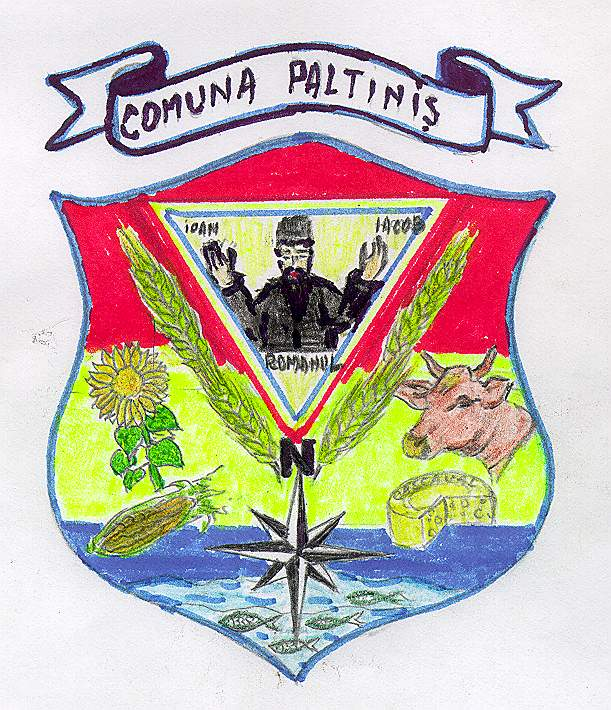
- Coat of arms

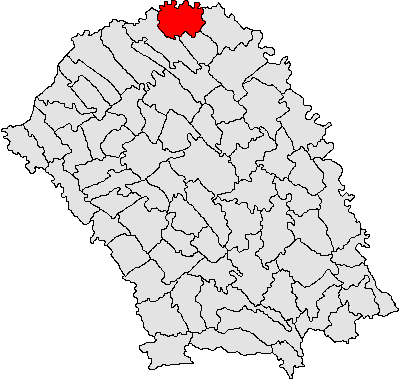
- Location in Botoșani County

- Location in Romania
- Coordinates: 48°13′N 26°39′E
- Country: Romania
- County: Botoșani

Government
  - Mayor (2020–2024): Costel Romanescu (PNL)
- Area: 75.07 km^{2} (28.98 sq mi)
- Elevation: 240 m (790 ft)
- Population (2021-12-01): 4,145
  - Density: 55.22/km^{2} (143.0/sq mi)
- Time zone: UTC+02:00 (EET)
  - Summer (DST): UTC+03:00 (EEST)
- Postal code: 717295
- Vehicle reg.: BT
- Website: primariapaltinisbt.ro

Păltiniș is a commune in Botoșani County, Western Moldavia, Romania. It is composed of four villages: Cuzlău, Horodiștea, Păltiniș, and Slobozia.

The commune is located in the northern part of the county, on the border with Ukraine. Horodiștea village is situated at 48º15'N; this is the northernmost point in Romania.

== Sights ==
A small cluster of century-old oak trees (dating approximately from the second half of the 15th century) is located in the neighboring forest of Teioasa, about 3 km (1.9 mi) northwest of Păltiniș.

The original cluster was composed of four oak trees. The trees formed a rectangle with its corners roughly pointing at the main cardinal points. Three of these oak trees were still standing as recently as 2005; the fourth was still standing in 1999, but was later removed; by then it had been severely damaged by disease. The trees are at least 30 metres (98 ft) tall.

The trees are locally known as "Stejarii lui Ștefan cel Mare" (Stephen the Great's Oak Trees). They roughly mark the halfway point on the route between Suceava (Stephen's seat) and the Hotin Fortress (Khotyn, near Kamyanets-Podilskyi, Ukraine). Hotin was the strongest fort on the northern border of medieval Moldavia. Local lore states Stephen the Great stopped over at least once at this forest location; on one particular occasion four acorns were planted "at the corners of Stephen's table", from which acorns the trees ensued. An undated water well can be found nearby.

== Natives ==
- Doxachi Hurmuzachi (1782–1857), ethnic Romanian boyar from the Duchy of Bukovina
