= Gheorghe Hurmuzachi =

Romanian journalist and folklorist

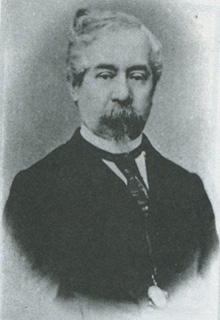

Gheorghe Hurmuzachi (September 17, 1817 – May 13, 1882) was an ethnic Romanian journalist and folklorist from Bukovina in Austria-Hungary.

The son of Doxachi Hurmuzachi and one of the Hurmuzachi brothers, he was born on the family estate in Cernăuca. This was located in the Duchy of Bukovina near Cernăuți, where he completed high school in 1835. He then graduated from the law faculty of the University of Vienna in 1839. He took part in the 1848 revolution in Vienna. That year, he founded and edited Bucovina, the first Romanian-language newspaper in his native province. He advocated for the establishment of a Romanian language and literature department at Czernowitz University.

From 1865 until his death, he was the first president of the Society for Romanian Literature and Culture in Bukovina. He offered financial support for its newsletter (Foaia Societății), where he was editor and contributor. He published articles and reviews about folklore. From 1863 to 1878 he was a deputy in the Diet of Bukovina, and also served in the House of Deputies. He died in Cernăuți.
