= Chernivtsi urban hromada =

Urban hromada in Chernivtsi Oblast, Ukraine

Chernivtsi urban hromada Чернівецька міська громада
- Hromada
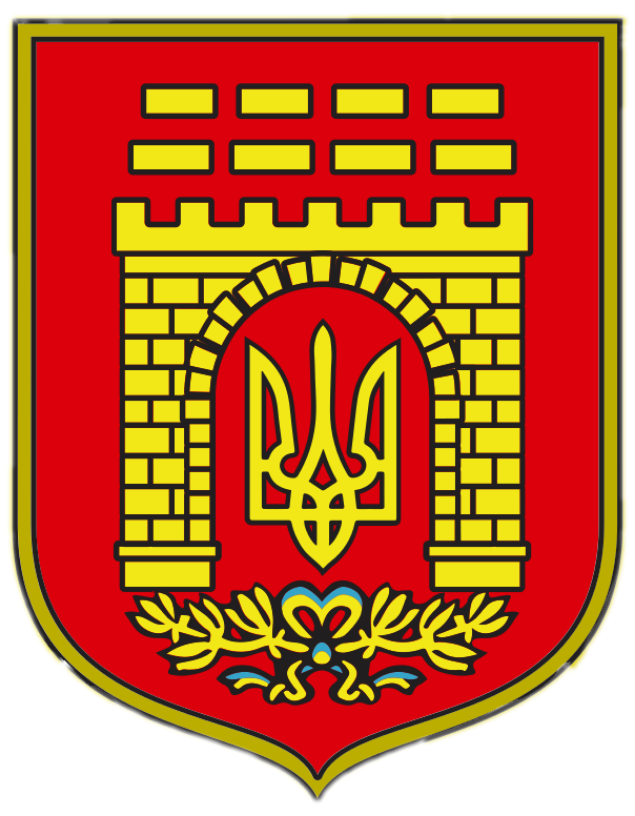
- Seal
- Interactive map of Chernivtsi urban hromada
- Country: Ukraine
- Oblast: Chernivtsi
- Raion: Chernivtsi

Area
  - Total: 180.4 km^{2} (69.7 sq mi)

Population (2023)
  - Total: 270,578
  - Density: 1,500/km^{2} (3,885/sq mi)
- Settlements: 3
- Cities: 1
- Villages: 2

Chernivtsi urban territorial hromada (Ukrainian: Чернівецька міська територіальна громада, romanized: Chernivetska miska terytorialna hromada) is a hromada of Ukraine, located in the western Chernivtsi Oblast. Its administrative centre is the city of Chernivtsi, also the capital of Chernivtsi Oblast.

The hromada has a size of 180.4 km^{2} (69.7 mi^{2}). As of 2023, it has a population of 270,578.

== Settlements ==
In addition to one city (Chernivtsi), there are two villages within the hromada:

- Koroviia
- Chornivka
