= Hurmuzachi brothers =

The Hurmuzachi brothers, Alexandru (1823–1871), Constantin (1811–1869), Eudoxiu (1812–1874), Gheorghe (1817–1882), and Nicolae (1826–1909), were members of an old Hurmuzachi family of Romanian nobles in Austrian Bukovina with an estate in Cernăuca. They were activists in the Romanian national movement in Bukovina and elsewhere.

Their estate was a center of activity for Romanians during the Revolutions of 1848, and they were later a key source of material and financial support to nationalist exiles, as well as a point of contact through whom the ideas of the exiles reentered the country.

Their father was Doxachi (Doxache, Doxaki) Hurmuzachi (Hurmuzaki).

Eudoxiu and Alexandru Hurmuzachi were members of the Romanian Academy.

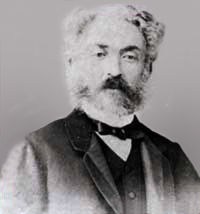
Alexandru Hurmuzachi

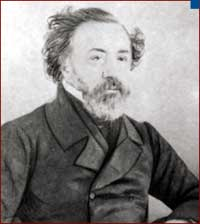
Constantin Hurmuzachi

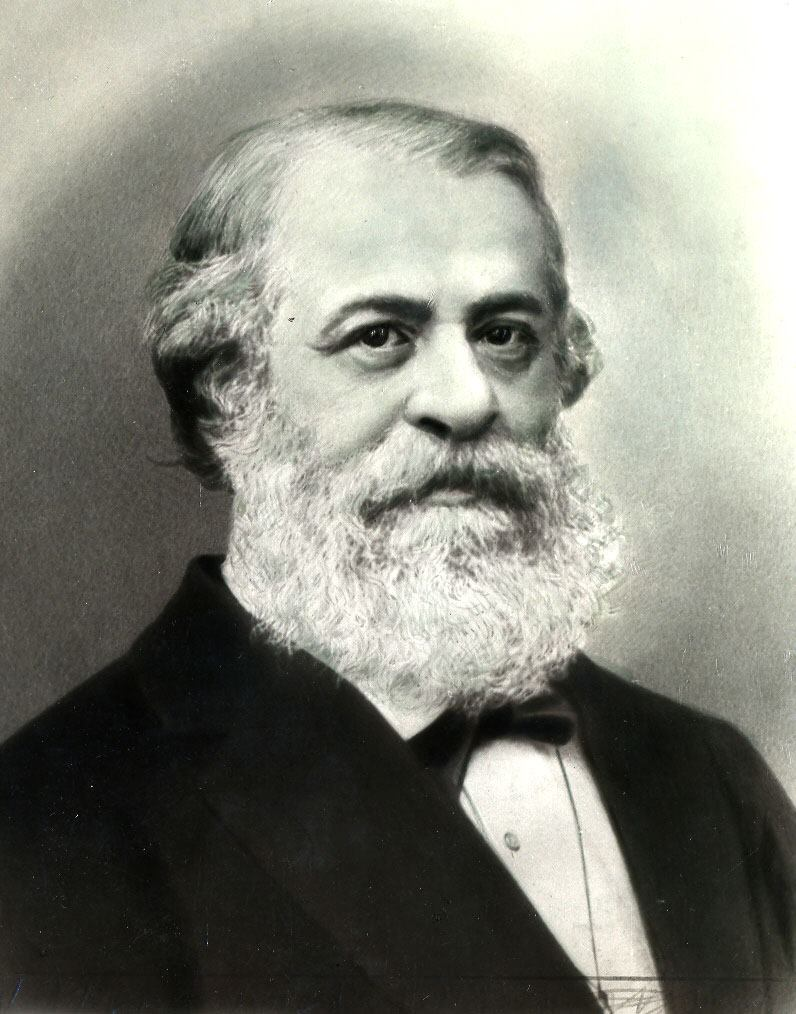
Eudoxiu Hurmuzachi

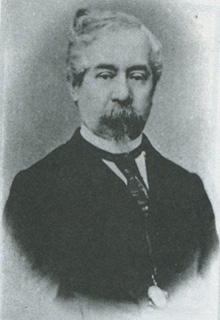
Gheorghe Hurmuzachi
