= Alexandru Hurmuzaki =

Romanian politician and publisher

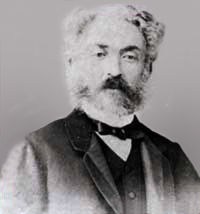
Alexandru Hurmuzachi.

Alexandru (Alecu) Hurmuzaki (16 August 1823 in Cernăuca – 8 March /20 March 1871 in Naples) was a Romanian politician and publisher. He was one of the founding members of the Romanian Academy.

He and was buried next to his brother Constantin, in the courtyard of the Descent of the Holy Spirit Church in Dulcești, Neamț County.

== See also ==
- Hurmuzachi brothers
- Hurmuzachi family
