= Sârbi (Valea Neagră) =

- Location within Romania

Location
- Country: Romania
- Counties: Neamț County
- Villages: Moldoveni, Secuieni

Physical characteristics
- Mouth: Valea Neagră
  - coordinates: 46.8537°N 26.8802°E
- Length: 13 km (8.1 mi)
- Basin size: 57 km^{2} (22 sq mi)

Basin features
- Progression: Valea Neagră→ Siret→ Danube→ Black Sea
- Tributaries
  - left: Valea Morilor
- River code: XII.1.42.5

The Sârbi (also: Valea Sârbilor) is a right tributary of the river Valea Neagră in Romania. It flows into the Valea Neagră near Secuienii Noi. Its length is 13 km (8.1 mi) and its basin size is 57 km^{2} (22 sq mi).
