= Secuieni, Neamț =

Secuieni
- Commune
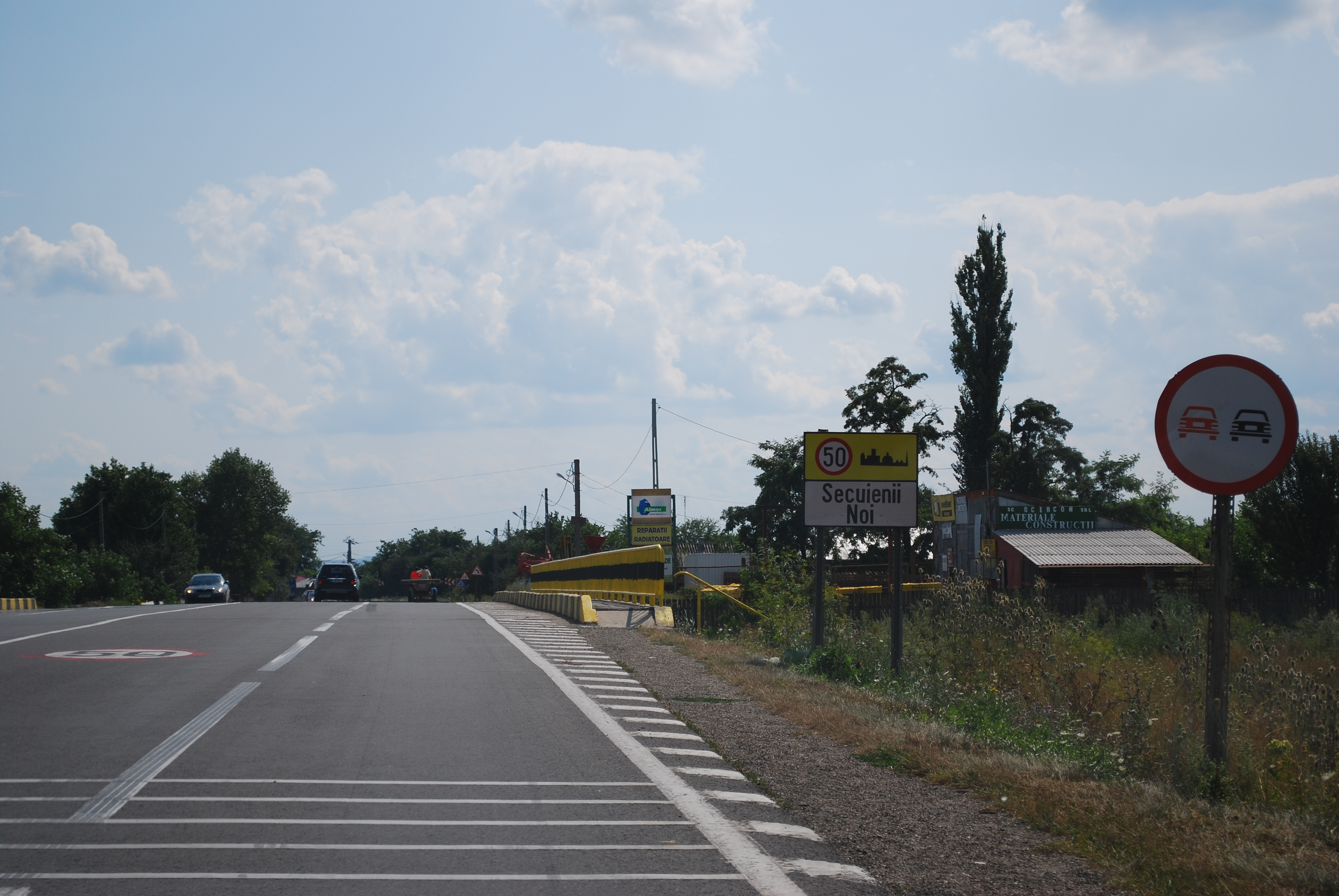
- Entrance to Secuienii Noi on DN2

- Location in Neamț County

- Location in Romania
- Coordinates: 46°51′N 26°50′E
- Country: Romania
- County: Neamț

Government
  - Mayor (2024–2028): Dorin Mihai (PSD)
- Area: 72.86 km^{2} (28.13 sq mi)
- Elevation: 198 m (650 ft)
- Population (2021-12-01): 2,809
  - Density: 38.55/km^{2} (99.85/sq mi)
- Time zone: UTC+02:00 (EET)
  - Summer (DST): UTC+03:00 (EEST)
- Postal code: 617415
- Area code: +(40) 233
- Vehicle reg.: NT
- Website: primariasecuieni.ro

Secuieni is a commune in Neamț County, Western Moldavia, Romania. It is composed of nine villages: Bașta, Bârjoveni, Bogzești, Butnărești, Giulești, Prăjești, Secuieni, Secuienii Noi, and Uncești.

== Geography ==
The commune is situated on the Moldavian Plateau, at an altitude of 198 m (650 ft), on the banks of the river Sârbi. It is located in the southeastern part of Neamț County, 12 km (7.5 mi) southwest of Roman and 45 km (28 mi) southeast of the county seat, Piatra Neamț, on the border with Bacău County.

The village of Secuienii Noi is crossed by national road DN2 (part of European route E85), which links Bucharest with the historical regions of Moldavia and Bukovina. The commune is also crossed by county roads DJ157 (leading to Piatra Neamț) and DJ158 (leading to Buhuși).

Historical population
Year	Pop.	±%
1992	3,708	—
2002	3,641	−1.8%
2011	2,967	−18.5%
2021	2,809	−5.3%
Source: Census data

== Natives ==
- Nicoleta Grasu (born 1971), discus thrower
- Vasile Petre Jitariu (1905 – 1989), biologist, member of the Romanian Academy
