= Nicolae Hurmuzachi =

Politician

Nicolae Hurmuzachi (March 19, 1826–September 19, 1909) was an ethnic Romanian journalist and folklorist from Bukovina in Austria-Hungary.

The son of Doxachi Hurmuzachi and one of the Hurmuzachi brothers, he was born on the family estate in Cernăuca. This was located in the Duchy of Bukovina near Cernăuți, where he attended primary school, gymnasium and high school. He traveled to Paris and Berlin before settling in his native village. He undertook political and cultural activities on behalf of the Romanian community in Bukovina. In 1862, he was a founding member of the Romanian Reading Society in Cernăuți, and from 1879 was on the governing board of the Society for Romanian Literature and Culture in Bukovina. Named a baron of Austria in October 1881, he was elected an honorary member of the Romanian Academy in April 1883. He died in Cernăuca.
