= Chornivka =

Village in Chernivtsi Oblast, Ukraine

Chornivka Чорнівка Cernăuca
- Village
- Location in Chernivtsi Oblast Location in Ukraine
- Coordinates: 48°25′12″N 26°0′36″E
- Country: Ukraine
- Oblast: Chernivtsi Oblast
- Raion: Chernivtsi Raion
- Hromada: Chernivtsi urban hromada
- First mention: 1412
- Elevation: 240 m (790 ft)

Population (2005)
  - Total: 2,340
- Time zone: UTC+2 (EET)
  - Summer (DST): UTC+3 (EEST)
- Postal code: 60310
- Area code: +380 3733

Chornivka (Ukrainian: Чорнівка; Romanian: Cernăuca; German: Czernowka) is a village in Chernivtsi Raion, Chernivtsi Oblast (province) of western Ukraine. It belongs to Chernivtsi urban hromada, one of the hromadas of Ukraine. It is located in the historic region of Bukovina (Ukrainian: Буковина), approximately 22 km from the oblast capital, Chernivtsi.

The current estimated population is 2,340 (as of 2005).

As of 2005, the mayor was Gheorghe Bota.

== History ==
Chornivka is home to the ancestral estate of the Hurmuzachi brothers, a well-known family of Romanian aristocrats, lawyers and historians from the 19th century. The mansion was transformed into a museum in October 1999.

In the 17th century, the estate had been in the possession of the family of Ion Neculce, a Moldavian chronicler. It had come into the family's possession by marriage, as a wedding gift to Neculce's mother. It was then passed on to one of Neculce's sisters.

The oldest church, built by the Hurmuzachi family, dates back to 1852.

Until 18 July 2020, Chornivka belonged to Novoselytsia Raion. The raion was abolished in July 2020 as part of the administrative reform of Ukraine, which reduced the number of raions of Chernivtsi Oblast to three. The area of Novoselytsia Raion was split between Chernivtsi and Dniester Raions, with Chornivka being transferred to Chernivtsi Raion.

== Notable people ==
- Alexandru Hurmuzaki (1823–1871), Romanian politician and publisher, founding member of the Romanian Academy
- Constantin Hurmuzachi (1811–1869), Romanian lawyer and politician
- Eudoxiu Hurmuzachi (1812–1874), Romanian historian and politician who served as Landeshauptmann of the Duchy of Bucovina
- Gheorghe Hurmuzachi (1817–1882), Romanian journalist and folklorist
- Nicolae Hurmuzachi (1826–1909), Romanian journalist and folklorist
