= Doxachi Hurmuzachi =

Doxachi Hurmuzachi (September 6, 1782–March 30, 1857) was an ethnic Romanian boyar from the Duchy of Bukovina.

The Hurmuzachi family traced its origins to the Moldavian boyar Cârstea (ca. 1660 — before 1742), high Pitar (bread supplier), related to Prince George Ducas. His son, baptized Hurmuzachi (ca. 1685 — 1738), Logofăt and Vornic of Botoșani, was the founder of the family, the descendants keeping his name.

Doxachi was born in Horodiștea, Botoșani County. His father Constantin was a Medelnicer (hand-washer). He inherited the Cernăuca estat near Cernăuți, setting there in 1804. He helped initiate the Romanian national movement in Bukovina, later enlisting the five sons he had with his wife Ilinca, the Hurmuzachi brothers. A dual citizen of Austria and Moldavia, he kept close ties to the latter's capital Iași. The Prince of Moldavia conferred on him the titles of Căminar (tax collector, 1819), high Aga (1827) and high Vornic. A cultured man, he knew Greek, translating a religious text in 1848. The same year, he sheltered Moldavian revolutionaries (such as Alexandru Ioan Cuza, Vasile Alecsandri, Gheorghe Sion and Mihail Kogălniceanu), spurring a revival of Romanian politics and culture in Bukovina. He became a symbol for Romanian patriots, and his political testament was regarded as sacrosanct by his followers.
