= Trifești, Neamț =

Trifești
- Commune
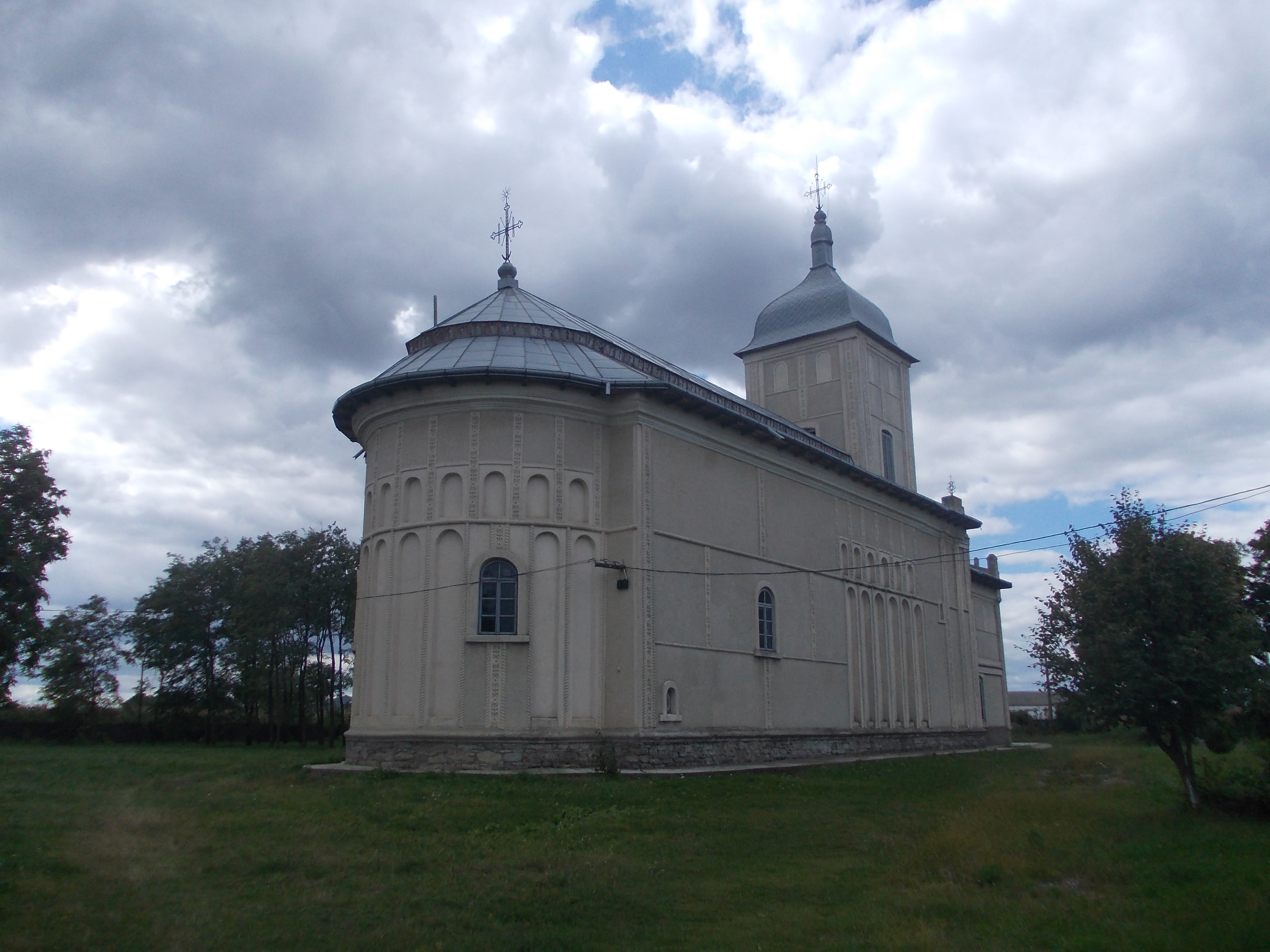
- All Saints church in Miron Costin village

- Location in Neamț County

- Location in Romania
- Coordinates: 46.902°N 26.864°E
- Country: Romania
- County: Neamț

Government
  - Mayor (2020–2024): Dan-Marian Lupu (PNL)
- Area: 60.95 km^{2} (23.53 sq mi)
- Elevation: 209 m (686 ft)
- Population (2021-12-01): 4,234
  - Density: 69.47/km^{2} (179.9/sq mi)
- Time zone: UTC+02:00 (EET)
  - Summer (DST): UTC+03:00 (EEST)
- Postal code: 617475
- Area code: +(40) 233
- Vehicle reg.: NT
- Website: primariatrifesti.ro

Trifești is a commune in Neamț County, Western Moldavia, Romania. It is composed of two villages, Miron Costin and Trifești.

Historical population
Year	Pop.	±%
1992	5,120	—
2002	5,087	−0.6%
2011	4,551	−10.5%
2021	4,234	−7.0%
Source: Census data
