= Făurei, Neamț =

Commune in Romania

Făurei
- Commune
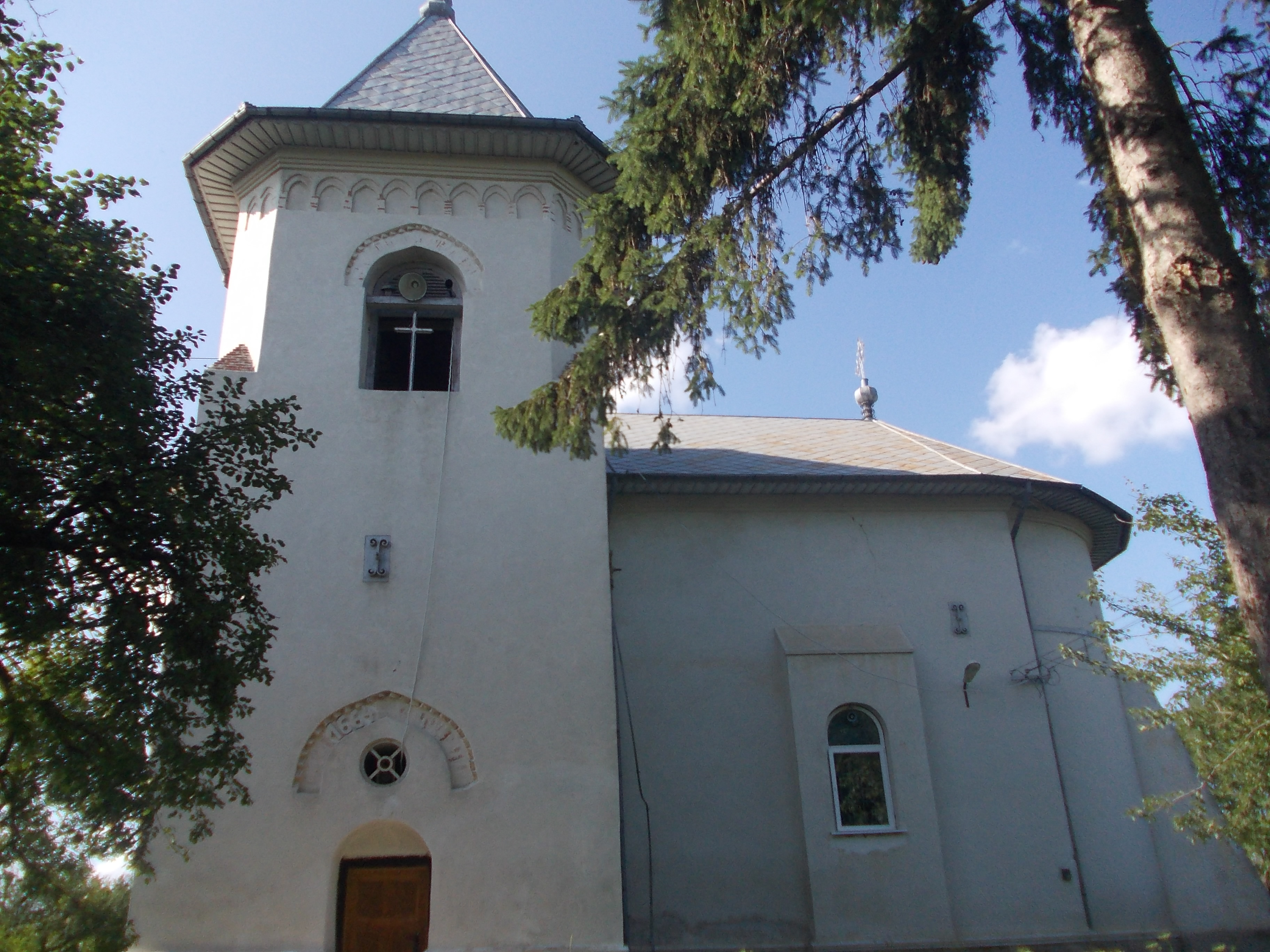
- Saint John the Baptist Church in Budești

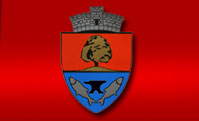
- Coat of arms

- Location in Neamț County

- Location in Romania
- Coordinates: 46.9241°N 26.7152°E
- Country: Romania
- County: Neamț

Government
  - Mayor (2020–2024): Petrică Bujor (PNL)
- Area: 52.02 km^{2} (20.09 sq mi)
- Elevation: 382 m (1,253 ft)
- Population (2021-12-01): 1,877
  - Density: 36.08/km^{2} (93.45/sq mi)
- Time zone: UTC+02:00 (EET)
  - Summer (DST): UTC+03:00 (EEST)
- Postal code: 617195
- Area code: +(40) 233
- Vehicle reg.: NT
- Website: www.comunafaurei.ro

Făurei is a commune in Neamț County, Western Moldavia, Romania. It is composed of four villages: Budești, Climești, Făurei, and Micșunești.

Historical population
Year	Pop.	±%
1992	2,422	—
2002	2,347	−3.1%
2011	1,987	−15.3%
2021	1,877	−5.5%
Source: Census data
