= Bârgăuani =

- Commune
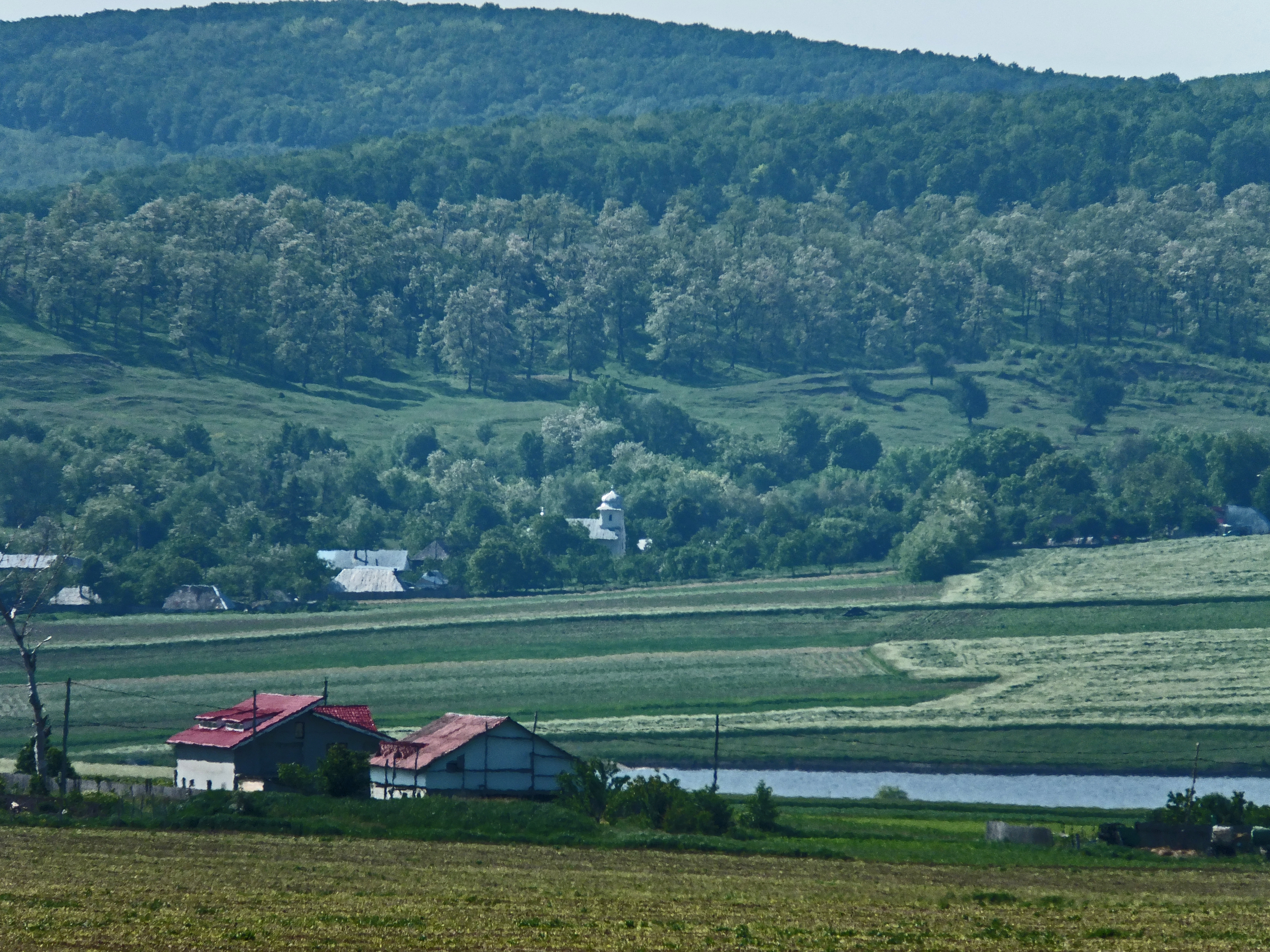
- Dârloaia village

- Location in Neamț County

- Location in Romania
- Coordinates: 46°59′N 26°39′E
- Country: Romania
- County: Neamț

Government
  - Mayor (2020–2024): Petrică Șchiopu (PSD)
- Area: 75.27 km^{2} (29.06 sq mi)
- Elevation: 347 m (1,138 ft)
- Population (2021-12-01): 2,904
  - Density: 38.58/km^{2} (99.92/sq mi)
- Time zone: UTC+02:00 (EET)
  - Summer (DST): UTC+03:00 (EEST)
- Postal code: 617040
- Area code: +(40) 233
- Vehicle reg.: NT
- Website: comunabargauani.ro

Bârgăuani (Hungarian: Bargován) is a commune in Neamț County, Western Moldavia, Romania. It is composed of thirteen villages: Bahna Mare, Baratca (Barátka), Bălănești, Bârgăuani, Breaza (Bráza), Certieni, Chilia, Dârloaia, Ghelăiești, Hârtop, Homiceni, Talpa (Talpa), and Vlădiceni.

The commune is situated on the Moldavian Plateau, at an altitude of 347 m (1,138 ft), on the banks of the river Valea Neagră. It is located in the east-central part of the county, 29 km (18 mi) from the county seat, Piatra Neamț.

Historical population
Year	Pop.	±%
1992	4,438	—
2002	4,239	−4.5%
2011	3,505	−17.3%
2021	2,904	−17.1%
Source: Census data

At the 2002 census, Bârgăuani had 4,239 inhabitants, of which 96.8% were ethnic Romanians; 62.8% were Romanian Orthodox and 36.9% Roman Catholic. At the 2021 census, the commune had a population of 2,904; of those, 91.8% were Romanians.
