= Former administrative divisions of Romania =

The 41 județe (English: counties) and the municipality of Bucharest comprise the official administrative divisions of Romania. They also represent the European Union' s NUTS-3 geocode statistical subdivision scheme of Romania.

== Overview ==
Territorial evolution of Romania, 1859-present (animated map).

The earliest organization into județe of the Principalities of Wallachia, respectively ținuturi of Moldavia, dates back at least to the late 14th century. Each județ, respectively ținut, was ruled by a jude, respectively pârcălab, an officially appointed person who had administrative and judicial functions in a manner inspired from the organization of the late Byzantine Empire. Transylvania, when it was part of the historic Kingdom of Hungary (in the Middle Ages), an independent Principality or a Habsburg domain (in the modern era until World War I) was divided into royal counties (Latin: comitatus), headed by comes (royal counts) with administrative and judicial functions. The term județ started to be used in Romanian as a general term for all administrative divisions since the mid 19th century.

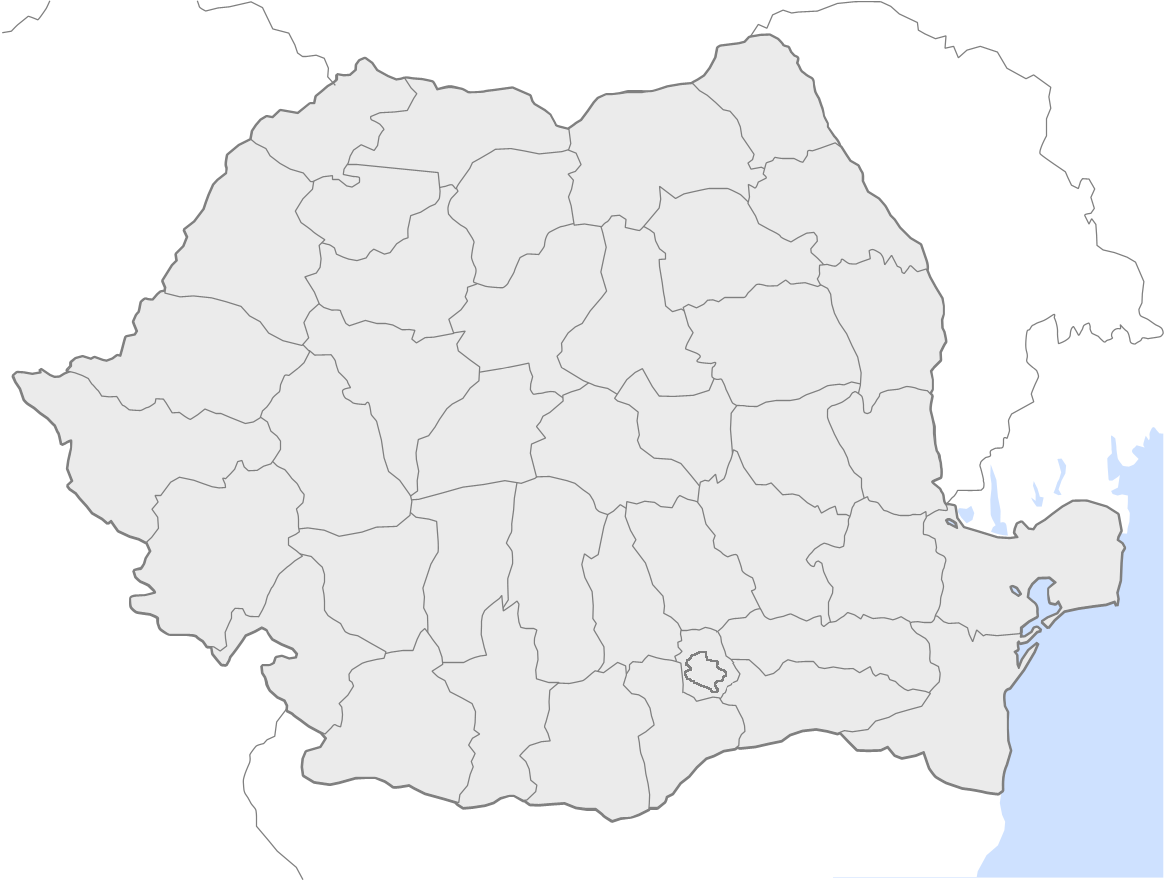

When modern Romania was formed in 1859 through the union of Wallachia and rump Moldavia, and then extended in 1918 through the union of Transylvania, as well as Bukovina and Bessarabia (parts of Moldavia temporarily acquired by respectively the Habsburgs, 1775–1918, and the Russian Tsars, 1812–1917), the administrative division was modernized using the French departments system as model. With the exception of the Communist period, this system remained in place. A prefect (from the Latin praefectus) is appointed for each județ. The prefect is the representative of the government in the county and the head of the local administration in the areas not devolved to local authorities. Until 1950, each județ was divided into a number of plăși (singular plasă), each administered by a pretor (from the Latin praetor), appointed by the prefect. Currently, Romania has no NUTS-4 units, the counties being composed directly of cities (with or without municipality status) and communes.

As in all modern democracies, the political power in Romania is divided into three independent branches: legislative, executive, and judicial. The prefect and his administration have only executive prerogatives. However, the territorial districts of the Romanian judicial system overlap with county borders, thus avoiding further complication. At the same time with local elections (of mayors and councilors for the cities and communes), a County Council (consiliu județean) is directly elected for each county, and, since 2008, the President of the County Council is also elected by direct vote. As of now, the legislative powers of county councils are quite reduced, but there are plans for more decentralization. (These plans, however, call for introduction of Regional Councils for the 8 development regions of the NUTS-2 level.)

== Before World War I ==
As of 1872, Romania was organized into 33 counties of which 17 were in Wallachia (12 in Muntenia and 5 in Oltenia), and 16 were in Moldavia (13 in western Moldavia and 3 in Southern Bessarabia: Cahul County, Bolgrad County, Ismail County).

After Independence, Romania lost Southern Bessarabia and received Northern Dobruja. The Romanian Old Kingdom was divided into 32 counties, with the following seats:

- Argeș County – Pitești
- Bacău County – Bacău
- Botoșani County – Botoșani
- Brăila County – Brăila
- Buzău County – Buzău
- Constanța County – Constanța
  - Silistra Nouă County (1878–1879, merged into Constanța County) – Rasova/Cernavodă/Medgidia
- Covurlui County – Galați
- Dâmbovița County – Târgoviște
- Dolj County – Craiova
- Dorohoi County – Dorohoi
- Fălciu County – Huși
- Gorj County – Târgu Jiu
- Ialomița County – Călărași
- Iași County – Iași
- Ilfov County – București
- Mehedinți County – Turnu Severin
- Muscel County – Câmpulung
- Neamț County – Piatra Neamț
- Olt County – Slatina
- Prahova County – Ploiești
- Putna County – Focșani
- Râmnicu Sărat County – Râmnicu Sărat
- Roman County – Roman
- Romanați County – Caracal
- Suceava County – Fălticeni
- Tecuci County – Tecuci
- Teleorman County – Turnu Măgurele
- Tulcea County – Tulcea
- Tutova County – Bârlad
- Vaslui County – Vaslui
- Vâlcea County – Râmnicu Vâlcea
- Vlașca County – Giurgiu

Counties of Romania, 1864–1878

Counties of Romania, 1878–1912

After the Second Balkan War, Romania was awarded the southern part of Dobrudja, between the Danube, Beli Lom River, Kamchiya River, and the Black Sea, which was divided into two counties:

- Durostor County – Silistra
- Caliacra County – Bazargic

== Interwar Romania ==
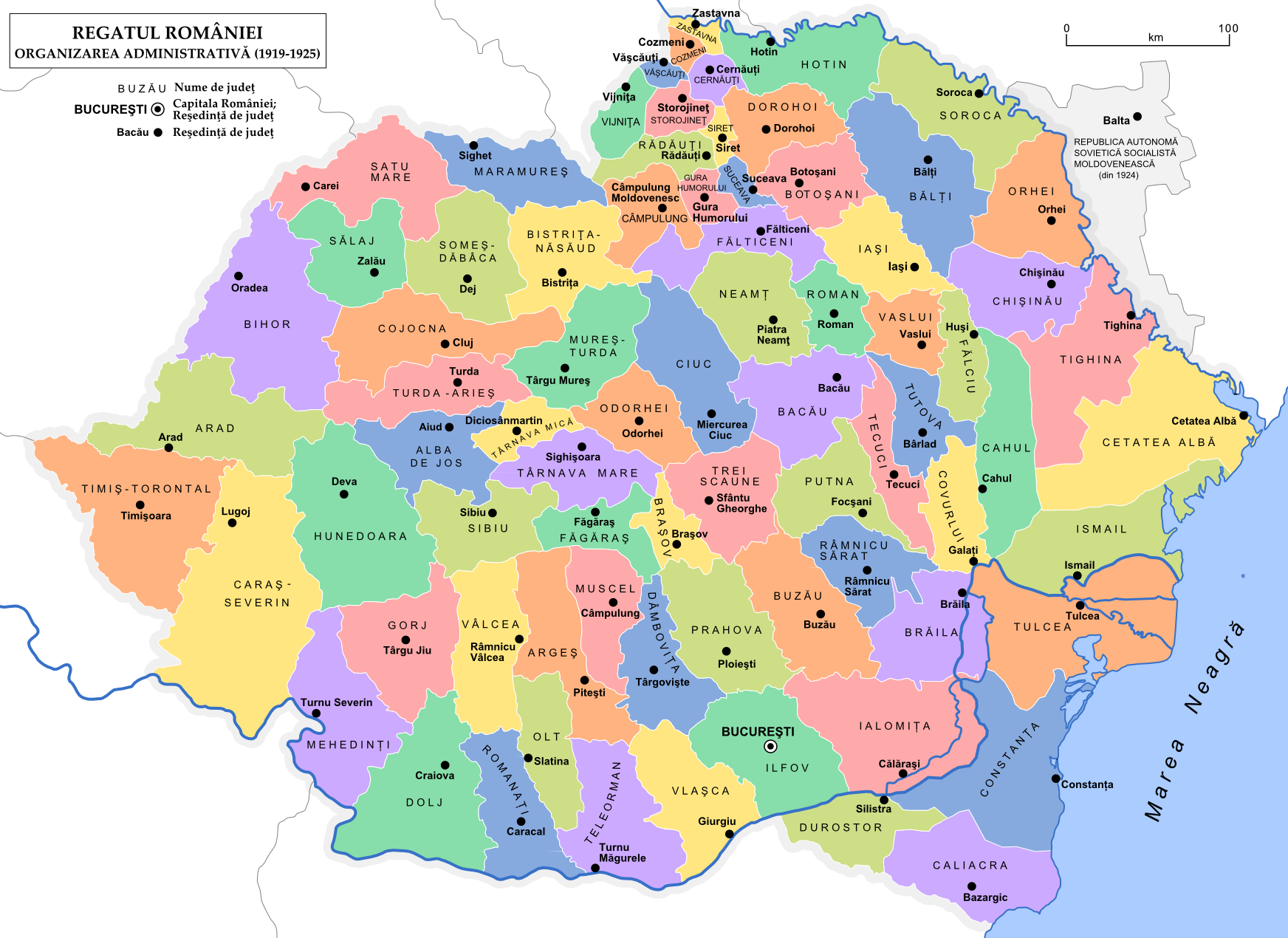
Administrative organizations of the Kingdom of Romania between 1919 and 1925

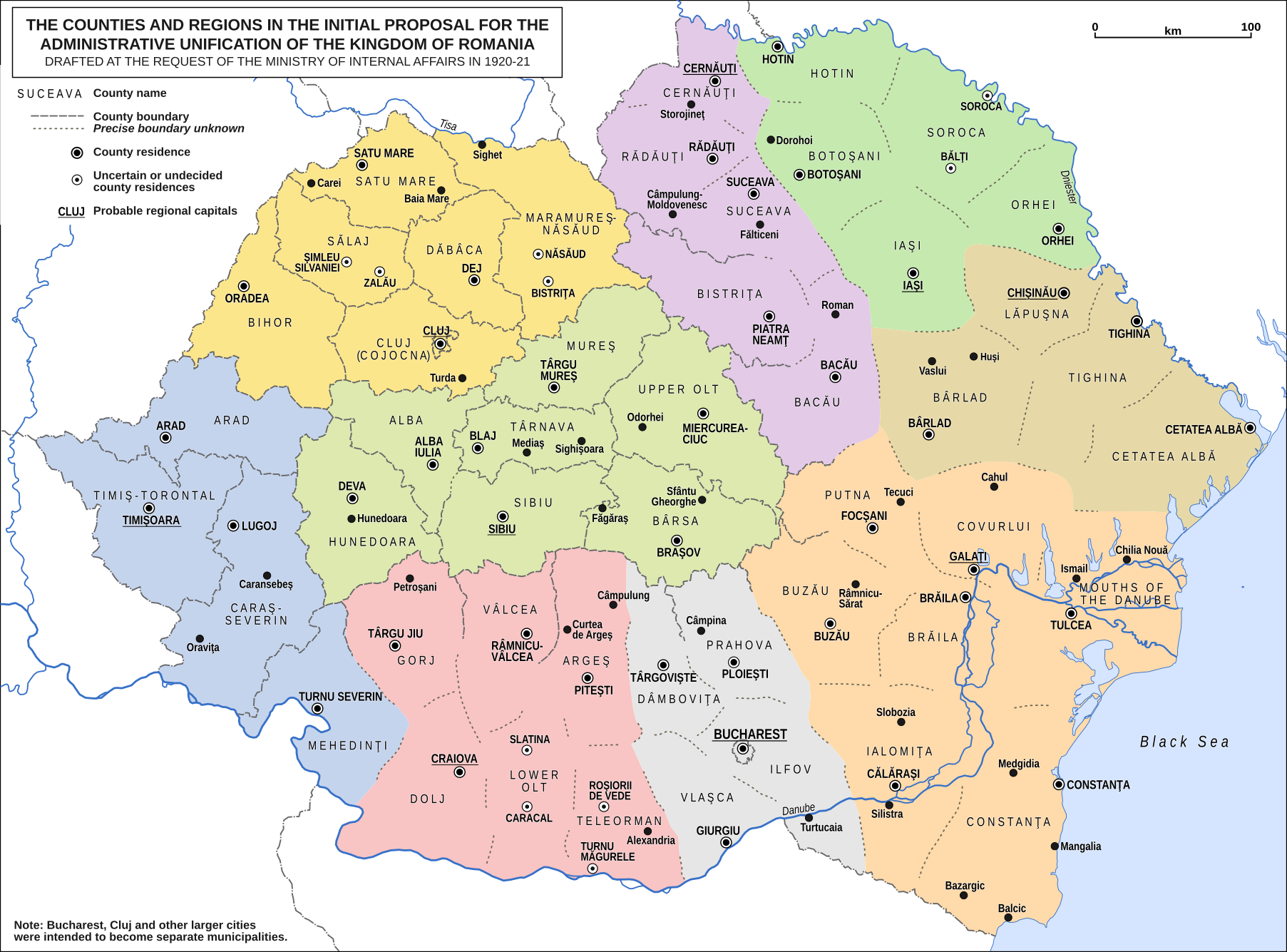
The original proposal for the administrative unification of interwar Romania (Simion Mehedinți Commission, 1920) aimed to create 48 counties and 9 regions

The 71 counties of Romania between 1927 and 1938 with their subdivisions (plăși)

Between 1919 and 1925 the specifics of the administrative organization in the new territories were kept. It consisted of about 76 counties or parts of counties. In 1923 Romania adopted a new Constitution, and it unified the traditional administrative systems of Transylvania, Bukovina and Bessarabia with that of the Romanian Old Kingdom. County borders were kept largely intact, with only a couple minor adjustments. As a result of the 1925 administrative unification law, the territory was divided into 71 counties, 489 districts (plăși) and 8,879 communes.

Some of the 71 județe still exist today, a number were lost during World War II, and some became defunct. The latter ones are:

- Baia County – divided between Neamț, Suceava and Iași
- Caraș County – merged with Severin to form Caraș-Severin
- Câmpulung County – merged with Suceava
- Ciuc County – merged with Odorhei and renamed to Harghita
- Covurlui County – merged into Galați
- Dorohoi County – merged with Botoșani
- Făgăraș County – divided between Brașov and Sibiu
- Fălciu County – merged with Vaslui
- Ialomița County – divided between Ialomița and Călărași
- Muscel County – merged with Argeș
- Odorhei County – merged with Ciuc and renamed to Harghita
- Putna County – renamed to Vrancea
- Rădăuți County – merged with Suceava
- Râmnicu Sărat County – divided between Vrancea, Buzău and Brăila
- Roman County – merged with Neamț
- Romanați County – divided between Dolj and Olt
- Severin County – merged with Caraș to form Caraș-Severin
- Someș County – divided between Maramureș County, Cluj, Sălaj and Bistrița-Năsăud
- Târnava Mică County – divided between Alba, Sibiu and Mureș
- Târnava Mare County – divided between Brașov, Sibiu and Mureș
- Tecuci County – divided between Galați, Bacău and Vaslui
- Timiș-Torontal County – renamed to Timiș
- Trei Scaune County – renamed to Covasna
- Turda County – divided between Cluj and Alba
- Tutova County – merged with Vaslui
- Vlașca County – renamed to Giurgiu

=== Ținuturi: 1938–1940 ===
The regions of Romania (August 14, 1938 – September 16, 1940)

The regions of Romania (September 16–22, 1940)

As a part of King Carol II's administrative reform of August 14, 1938, 10 regions (ținuturi) were created, which each included several of the existing 71 counties. The counties were preserved as administrative units, but most of their responsibilities were transferred to the new regions. Each region was headed by a regional governor (Rezident Regal), who supervised the county prefects, and each region had a regional council. The regional governor was appointed directly by the King. The aim of the new regions was to connect poorer and richer counties and to break up the historical regions (Bessarabia, Bukovina, Transylvania etc.). However, the old regionalisms continued under the new brand (e.g. Transylvanian regionalism in Ținutul Mureș and Bukovinian regionalism in Ținutul Suceava). The new regions were short-lived: all regions but Ținutul Olt and Ținutul Timiș had lost territory in September 1940, following the cession of Bessarabia and Northern Bukovina to the USSR, the Second Vienna Award and the Treaty of Craiova. After the fall of Carol II's personal regime (the so-called royal dictatorship) on September 6, 1940, the Ținuturi Timiș, Mureș, Mării, Dunărea de Jos, Prut and Suceava were restructured on September 16, 1940. All the regions were abolished only a couple of days later, on September 22, 1940.
According to the Official Journal of August 14, 1938, the 10 regions and their capitals were the following:

Region	Capital
Ținutul Olt (draft version: Ținutul Jiu)	Craiova
Ținutul Bucegi (draft version: Ținutul Argeș)	Bucharest
Ținutul Mării	Constanța
Ținutul Dunărea de Jos (draft version: Ținutul Dunării)	Galați
Ținutul Nistru	Chișinău
Ținutul Prut	Iași
Ținutul Suceava	Cernăuți
Ținutul Mureș	Alba-Iulia
Ținutul Someș (draft version: Ținutul Crișuri)	Cluj
Ținutul Timiș	Timișoara

Several regions had been given other names in the draft version of the Law (mentioned between brackets). All regions were named after rivers, except Ținutul Mării, i.e. the (Black) Sea Region, and Ținutul Bucegi, called after the Bucegi Mountains.

== World War II changes ==
=== Bessarabia ===
After the recovery of Bessarabia, the Bessarabia Governorate with capital at Chișinău was established in 1941 and existed until 1944. It included the counties of Bălți, Cetatea Albă, Cahul, Chilia (newly established), Ismail, Lăpușna, Orhei, Soroca and Tighina.

=== Bukovina ===
Following the recapture of Northern Bukovina, the Bukovina Governorate with capital at Cernăuți (Chernivtsi) existed from 1941 to 1944. It included the counties of Câmpulung, Cernăuți, Dorohoi, Hotin, Rădăuți, Storojineț and Suceava.

=== Administration of Transnistria (1941–1944) ===
Administrative divisions of Romania in 1942

This territory was administered by Romania briefly in 1941–1944, when the country was governed by a military dictatorship allied with Nazi Germany. It consisted of formerly proper Soviet territory between Dniester and Southern Bug rivers. Nowadays, most of it is in Ukraine, with small parts in the Republic of Moldova (Transnistria). This territory was kept under Romanian military occupation, and was not annexed by Romania. It was divided into 13 counties:

- Ananiev County
- Balta County
- Berezovca County
- Dubăsari County
- Golta County
- Jugastru County
- Moghilău County
- Oceacov County
- Odesa County
- Ovidiopol County
- Râbnița County
- Tiraspol County
- Tulcin County

=== Lost during and after the war ===
To Bulgaria

In 1913, as a result of the Second Balkan War, Romania acquired Southern Dobruja from Bulgaria, annexing this historical region within Romania's borders. In 1940, Nazi Germany and Fascist Italy forced Romania to return it to Bulgaria (see Treaty of Craiova). Romania did not reclaim this area neither after the end of World War II nor at the fall of communism.

- Caliacra (now Dobrich Province, Bulgaria)
- Durostor (now Silistra Province, Bulgaria)

To the Soviet Union

In 1940, Soviet Union occupied Bessarabia, northern Bukovina, and the Hertsa region (the latter part of Dorohoi County in a rump Moldavia). Since the fall of the Soviet Union in 1991, these territories have been part of the newly independent Moldova and Ukraine.

in Moldova

- Bălți County
- Cahul County
- southern half of Hotin County
- Orhei County
- Lăpușna County
- Soroca County
- Tighina County
- a small part of Ismail County
- a small part of Cetatea Albă County

in Ukraine

- Cernăuți County
- largest part of Cetatea Albă County
- Hertsa region (a small part of Dorohoi County)
- northern half of Hotin County
- largest part of Ismail County
- part of Rădăuți County
- Storojineț County

== Communist Romania ==
=== People's Republic of Romania ===
In 1950, the Romanian Workers' Party changed the administrative division of Romania to the Soviet model (regions and raions), but reverted to the county system in 1968, although county borders were quite different from the interwar period. A small adjustment was performed in 1981: former counties of Ilfov and Ialomița were reorganized into the present-day counties of Giurgiu, Călărași, Ialomița and Ilfov.

A new law on the administrative division from September 6, 1950, abolished the 58 remaining counties (as well as the 424 plăși and the 6,276 urban and rural communes), replacing them with 28 regions composed of 177 raions, 148 cities and 4,052 communes. In 1952 the number of regions was reduced to 18: Arad, Bacău, Baia Mare, Bârlad, București, Cluj, Constanța, Craiova, Galați, Hunedoara, Iași, Oradea, Pitești, Ploiești, Stalin, Suceava, Timișoara, and for the first time and autonomous administrative unit based on ethnic criteria, Magyar Autonomous Region (Regiunea Autonomă Maghiară). In 1956 the regions of Arad and Bârlad were also dismantled. In 1960, the Hungarian autonomous unit was renamed to Regiunea Mureș-Autonomă Maghiară (Mureș-Hungarian Autonomous Region) along with changes in its territory. The final number of regions was 16.

Regions of Romania between 1950 and 1952

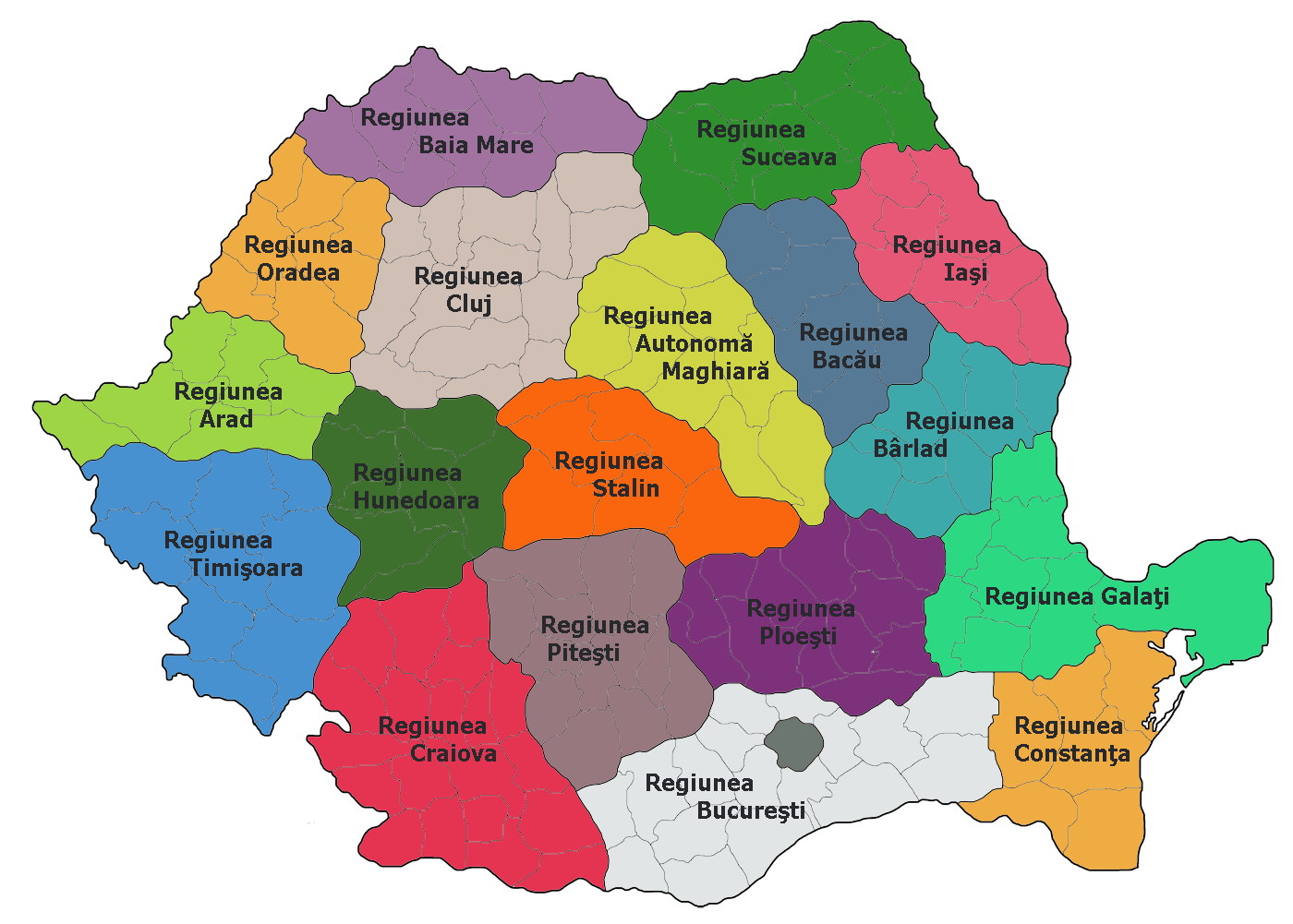
Regions of Romania between 1952 and 1956

Regions and raions of Romania between 1964 and 1967

=== Socialist Republic of Romania ===
In February 1968, the old administrative division of județ was reinstated. On January 14, 1968, the law proposal included 35 counties. The final result was substantially different from the situation existent before 1950. This included 39 counties, municipality of Bucharest, 236 cities, out of which 47 were municipalities, and 2706 communes comprising 13149 villages. There were several reasons for restoring the județe. For one, the Nicolae Ceaușescu regime wished to distance itself from the Soviet Union, and discarding the Soviet administrative model was a means of achieving that. For another, the regime had a nationalist outlook, and bringing back an old Romanian system fit with the prevailing ideology. Finally, during his first years, Ceaușescu was preoccupied with replacing functionaries named by his predecessor Gheorghe Gheorghiu-Dej and creating his own power base; dismissing the regional administrations and naming his own county officials was a step in that process.

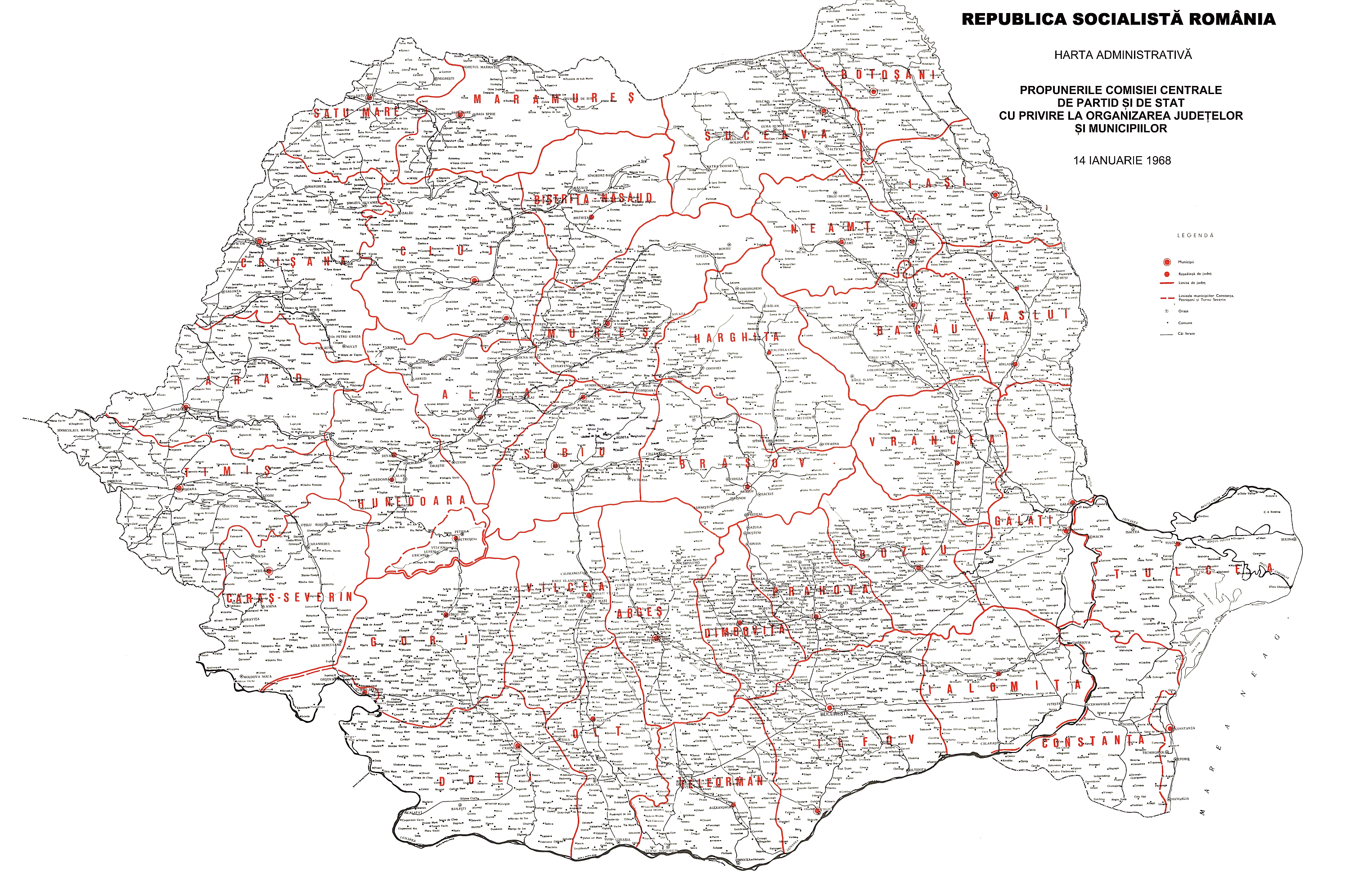
The original 1968 proposal with 35 counties

Current counties imposed over the inter-war counties

== Current situation ==
In 1981 the Ilfov County was divided into a so-called "Agricultural Sector" of Ilfov (Sectorul Agricol Ilfov) and the newly created Giurgiu County, and Călărași County was created by detaching the southern part of the Ialomița County. The county borders introduced in 1968 are largely in place at present, but administrative reforms during the 1990s have devolved the functions of different authorities in line with transition from a totalitarian communist system to a modern democracy. The only territorial adjustment after 1989 occurred in 1995, when Ilfov County was formed out of the so-called "agricultural sector" of the Municipality of Bucharest (Sectorul Agricol Ilfov). With Romania's integration into the European structures, its counties became NUTS level 3 divisions of the European Union. Currently, Romania is divided into 41 counties and the Municipality of Bucharest.

== Future developments ==
As of 2010–2011 there have been several proposals for the administrative reorganization of Romania made by the presidential commission tasked with the analysis of the current political and constitutional system. Most of these recommendations aim for the partial reestablishment of the counties in their pre-1950 form (NUTS III level). If this reform were adopted, the counties would be grouped into several regions (9 to 15) based on common historical and economic characteristics (NUTS II level). The regions will be in their turn clustered into 4–6 macroregions (NUTS I level). Furthermore, a NUTS IV level division, called plasă or canton, would probably be added in order to meet the EU statistical and administrative requirements.

Another proposal, based on 15 autonomous euro-regions (amongst them one ethnic-based region with a consistent Hungarian majority consisting of the existing Mureș, Harghita and Covasna counties) grouped into 5 statistical macroregions (NUTS I), was made by the Democratic Union of Hungarians in Romania.

In 2018, a name referendum was held in the Olt County to rename it to "Olt-Romanați County" in memory of the former Romanați County, but it did not reach the required turnout and therefore failed.

== See also ==
- List of cities in Romania
- Etymological list of counties of Romania
- Communes of Romania
- Municipality in Romania
