= Corneliu Calotescu =

Romanian general

- Born: 19 November 1889; Pitești, Kingdom of Romania
- Died: 17 October 1970 (aged 80); Pitești, Socialist Republic of Romania
- Military career
- Allegiance: Kingdom of Romania
- Branch: Army
- Service years: 1908–1945
- Rank: 2nd Lieutenant (1910); 1st Lieutenant; Captain; Major; Lieutenant Colonel (1927); Colonel (1934); Brigadier General (1939); Major General (1942)
- Commands: 4th Dorobanți Infantry Regiment; 3rd Infantry Division; 2nd Vânători de munte Division
- Conflicts: World War I; Battle of Mărăști; World War II; Eastern Front; 1941 Odessa massacre
- Awards: Order of Michael the Brave, 3rd class Order of the Crown (Romania), Commander class
- Other work: Secretary-General, Under-Secretariat of State for Land Forces (1940); Governor-General of Bukovina (1941–1943)

Corneliu Calotescu (November 19, 1889 – October 17, 1970) was a Romanian major-general in World War II.

He was born in Pitești, the son of Constantin and Felicia Calotescu. Following into his father footsteps, he chose to go into a military career and enrolled in 1908 in the Bucharest Military School. He graduated in 1910 with the rank of second lieutenant and joined the 30th Dorobanți Muscel Regiment. After Romania entered World War I in August 1916 on the side of the Allies, Calotescu, by then a captain, fought at the Battle of Mărăști in the summer of 1917, and was subsequently decorated with the Order of Michael the Brave, Third Class.

Calotescu advanced in rank to lieutenant colonel in 1927 and colonel in 1934. From 1934 to 1934 he commanded the 4th Dorobanți Argeș Infantry Regiment, and in October 1939 he was promoted to brigadier general. He served as Secretary-General to the Under-Secretary of State of Land Forces in 1940. In June 1940 he was awarder the Order of the Crown, Commander class.

From 30 August 1941, he was Deputy Governor-General of Bukovina, and then Governor-General of Bukovina; he served in this position from 5 September 1941 to 20 March 1943. On October 4, 1941, the Romanian Supreme General Staff sent an order to the Cernăuți Military Command that indicated that Romania's military dictator Ion Antonescu had ordered the deportation to the east of the Dniester of the Jews of Bukovina, meaning the geographical/historical province, and not the expanded Bukovina Governorate. At the request of military dictator Ion Antonescu, Calotescu announced on October 10, 1941, his decision that all the Jews of Cernăuți must be deported to Transnistria by train. The Jews of Secureni Camp in Hotin County (a Bessarabian county at that time administratively a part of Bukovina) were evacuated in two groups, on October 2 and 5, while those in Edinet Camp in the same county were evacuated on October 10 and 13, both on foot and in carts rather than by train, based on orders that predated Calotescu's order. At his trial in 1945, Calotescu was accused of being responsible for the deportation of 56,000 Jews from Bukovina and of 12,000 Jews from Dorohoi County.

After Traian Popovici, the Mayor of Cernăuți, intervened, Calotescu agreed that Popovici would be allowed to nominate 200 Jews who were to be exempted from deportation; the number grew to around 20,000 (15,600 as "specialists", and 4,000 who had been issued "temporary permits" by the mayor) after Popovici appealed directly to Antonescu. Further 4,290 Chernivtsi Jews were deported to Transnistria in June 1942. About 16,794 of the Jews were allowed to stay in Chernivtsi after the June 1942 deportations, an important aspect of the history of the Jews in Transnistria. Jean Ancel has shown that the decision to deport the Jews of Dorohoi County in 1941 "originated from local government officials, such as members of the military, civil servants and lawyers" and was authorized by Calotescu. When Antonescu was informed of these deportations, following appeals by Jewish leader Wilhelm Filderman and National Peasants' Party politician Nicolae L. Lupu, he ordered that the Jews who were about to board the train not be deported to Transnistria. The 1942 deportations of Jews from Dorohoi seem not to have been ordered by Antonescu either; he nevertheless ordered further deportations of Jews from Cernăuți and Chișinău during the year.

As reported by Calotescu himself in September 1942, the total number of Bukovina Jews from the enlarged administrative Bukovina rather than merely historical Bukovina deported to Transnistria amounted to 90,284, however, this figure may not include those who died in transit camps. Jean Ancel provides slightly higher figures by county from April 9, 1942, again from a report from General Calotescu, with 33,891 from Cernăuți County, 6,118 from Câmpulung County, 3,919 from Storojineț County, 5,942 from Suceava County, 9,169 from Rădăuți County, including the part annexed by the Soviet Union (and thus 59,039 from historical Bukovina), 23,439 from Hotin County in northern Bessarabia and 9,367 from Dorohoi County in the Old Kingdom (excluding the Jews of Hertsa, which were already in a camp in Hotin County), all a part of administrative Bukovina, a total of 91,843 Jews deported to Transnistria. According to the September 1, 1941 census, there were 83,496 Jews in Bukovina and Dorohoi County (including 11,547 from Dorohoi County) and 21,468 in Hotin County, a total of 104,964 people; while after the 1941–1942 deportations, only 19,349 Jews remained in Bukovina and Dorohoi and 126 in Hotin County; the difference was 85,489. If one excludes Hotin County, which is included in the figures for Bessarabia, on November 15, 1943, there were 31,141 Bukovinian Jews and 6,425 Dorohoi Jews in Transnistria, a total of 37,566; this would suggest that only 43.94% of the deportees from historical Bukovina and Dorohoi County alive on September 1, 1941 were survivors of the deportations to Transnistria. However, about 16,794 of the Jews were allowed to stay in Chernivtsi, and 17,159 in Bukovina in its historical borders, after that. If one includes the 2,316 Jews who were allowed to remain in Dorohoi County, the total number was 19,475.

Besides the above-mentioned deportations of Jews to Transnistria in June 1942, Bukovina's governor Corneliu Calotescu reported to Ion Antonescu on August 21, 1942, that 147 Bukovinian Jewish Communists were deported to Transnistria, mainly from the city of Chernivtsi. In 1942, about 150 Jews from Bukovina were brought to the Vapniarka concentration camp; they included some refugees from Poland.

After being promoted to major general on 25 October 1942, Calotescu took command of the 3rd Infantry Division on 21 March 1943. After the coup d'état of 23 August 1944, he was named commander of the 2nd Vânători de munte Division, with which he fought in Transylvania until October 12, 1944, when he went into the reserves.

On 22 March 1945, Calotescu was put into retirement by the Petru Groza government. In May 1945 he was tried by the Bucharest People's Tribunal; found guilty of crimes (ordering the deportation of the Jews from Bukovina to Transnistria in 1941 and 1942), he was condemned to death. Later that year his sentence was commuted to life imprisonment, and he was sent to Aiud Prison. In June 1956 he was released. He returned to Pitești, where he died in 1970. In April 1968, Corneliu Calotescu was legally rehabilitated, received a pension and was assigned a comfortable, fully furnished apartment.

== Publications ==
- Calotescu, Corneliu (1929). În luptă cu Regimentul Muscel No. 30 (in Romanian). Bucharest: Editura Inst. de Arte Grafice "Lucia".

== See also ==
- History of the Jews in Chernivtsi
