= Ținutul Suceava =

- Region (Ținut)
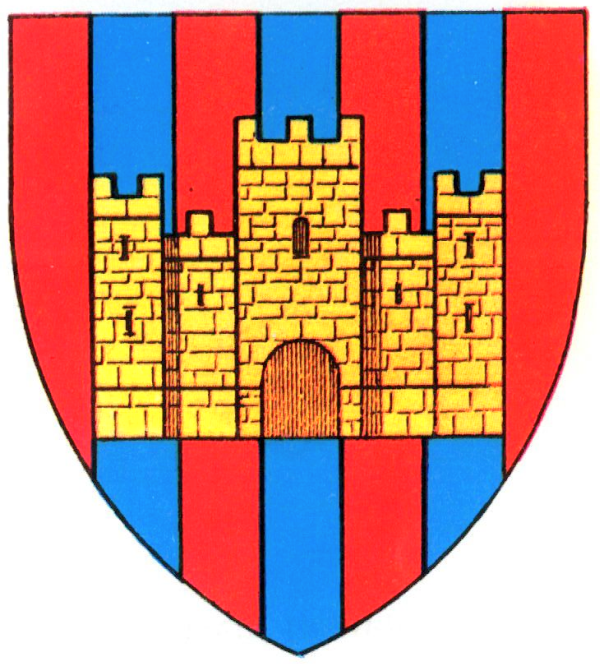
- Coat of arms

- Country: Romania
- Former counties included: Câmpulung County, Cernăuți County, Dorohoi County, Hotin County, Rădăuți County, Suceava County, Storojineț County
- Historic region: Bukovina, Bessarabia, Moldavia
- Administrative capital (Reședință de ținut): Cernăuți
- Created: August 14, 1938
- Abolished: September 22, 1940

Government
  - Type: Regional governor (Rezident Regal) and regional council

Population
  - Total: circa 1.5 million
- Time zone: UTC+2 (EET)
  - Summer (DST): UTC+3 (EEST)

Ținutul Suceava was one of the ten Romanian administrative regions (ținuturi) created on August 14, 1938, as a part of King Carol II's administrative reform. From August 14, 1938, to June 28, 1940, it included the whole of Bukovina, a county of Bessarabia (Hotin) and a county of Moldavia (Dorohoi). It was named after the river Suceava. Its administrative capital was the city of Cernăuți. After its northern part (the counties Cernăuți, Storojineț and Hotin, as well as parts of the counties Rădăuți and Dorohoi) was ceded to the USSR on June 28, 1940, Ținutul Suceava was restructured on September 16, 1940, when Baia county became a part of the region, and abolished only a few days later, on September 22, 1940. Ținutul Suceava had two governors: Gheorghe Alexianu (August 14, 1938 – February 1, 1939) and Gheorghe Flondor (February 1, 1939 – September 22, 1940). Alexianu's mandate was marked by the suppression of ethnic minority and Jewish rights.

== Coat of arms ==
The coat of arms consists of seven pallets, four of gules and three of azure, representing the former seven counties (județe) of Greater Romania which it included (of the total 71). Over the pallets there is a castle, representing the medieval citadel in Suceava.

== Constitutive counties ==
The administrative reform of August 14, 1938 kept the existing 71 counties, but transferred most of their responsibilities to the new regions. Ținutul Suceava included:

- Câmpulung County
- Cernăuți County
- Dorohoi County
- Hotin County
- Rădăuți County
- Suceava County
- Storojineț County

== See also ==
- Bukovina Governorate
- Historical administrative divisions of Romania
- Chernivtsi Oblast
- Nord-Est (development region)
- History of Romania
- History of Ukraine
