= Ținutul Mureș =

Former Land in Romania

Ținutul Mureș Ținutul Alba Iulia
- Land (Ținut)
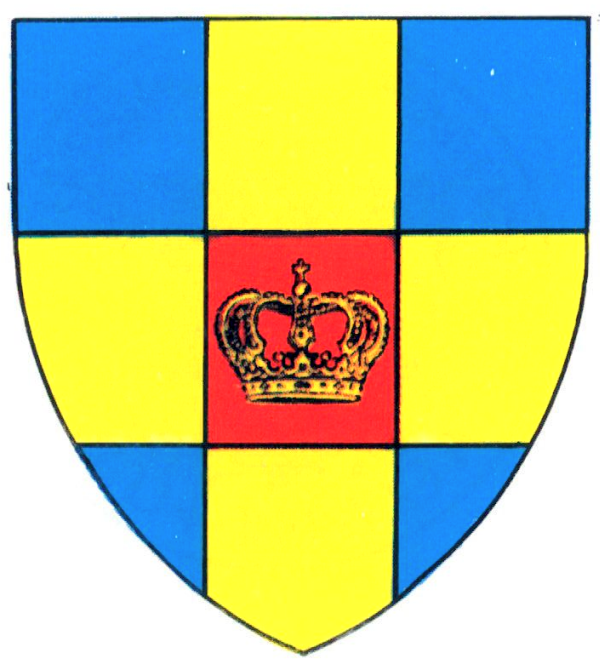
- Coat of arms

- Country: Romania
- Historic region: Transylvania
- Capital city (Reședință de ținut): Alba-Iulia
- Established: 14 August 1938
- Ceased to exist: 22 September 1940

Government
  - Type: Rezident Regal
- Time zone: UTC+2 (EET)
  - Summer (DST): UTC+3 (EEST)

Ținutul Mureș (draft version: Ținutul Alba Iulia) was one of the ten ținuturi ("lands") of Romania, founded in 1938 after King Carol II initiated an institutional reform by modifying the 1923 Constitution and the law of territorial administration. It comprised most of Transylvania, including parts of the Székely Land. Its capital was the city of Alba-Iulia. Ținutul Mureș ceased to exist following the territorial losses of Romania to Hungary and the king's abdication in 1940.

== Coat of arms ==
The coat of arms is party per cross in 9 equal squares, representing the former 9 counties (ținuturi) of Greater Romania (71 in total) which it had included. Four of the squares, forming the arms of a Greek cross, are of or. The four squares forming the corners of the shield are of azure. The square in the heart of the shield is gules, and bears an or Romanian Crown (in recollection of the 1922 Alba-Iulia coronation of Ferdinand I and Marie of Edinburgh as King and Queen of Greater Romania).

== Counties incorporated ==
After the 1938 Administrative and Constitutional Reform, of the previous 71 counties, Ținutul Mureș included 9:

- Alba County
- Ciuc County
- Făgăraș County
- Mureș County
- Odorhei County
- Sibiu County
- Târnava Mare County
- Târnava Mică County
- Turda County

== See also ==
- Historical administrative divisions of Romania
- Centru (development region)
- History of Romania
