= Ținutul Timiș =

- Land (Ținut)
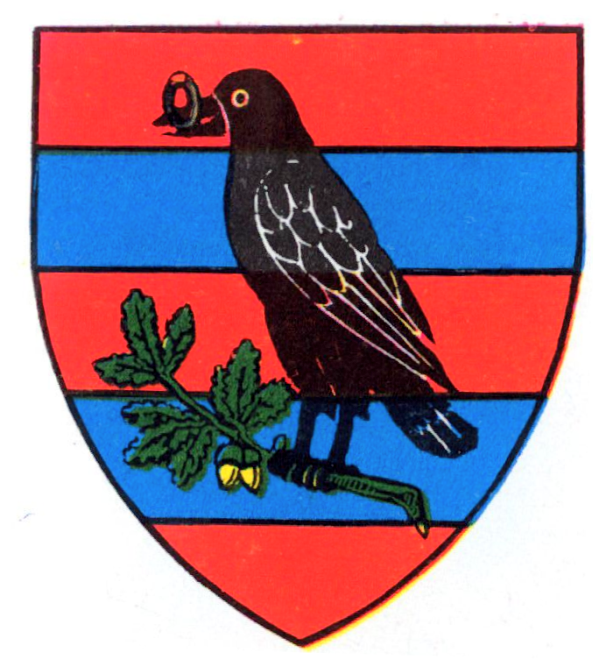
- Coat of arms

- Country: Romania
- Former counties included: Arad County, Caraș County, Hunedoara County, Severin County, Timiș-Torontal County
- Historic region: Transylvania (Banat)
- Capital city (Reședință de ținut): Timișoara
- Established: 14 August 1938
- Ceased to exist: 22 September 1940

Government
  - Type: Rezident Regal
- Time zone: UTC+2 (EET)
  - Summer (DST): UTC+3 (EEST)

Ținutul Timiș was one of the ten Romanian ținuturi ("lands"), founded in 1938 after King Carol II initiated an institutional reform by modifying the 1923 Constitution and the law of territorial administration. It comprised the Romanian Banat and parts of Transylvania, and was named after the Timiș River; its capital was the city of Timișoara. Ținutul Timiș ceased to exist following the territorial losses of Romania to the Axis powers and the king's abdication in 1940.

== Coat of arms ==
The coat of arms consists of five bars, three of gules and two of azure, representing the former five counties (județe) of Greater Romania (of the total 71) that were included in the ținut. Over the bars is a sable raven facing dexter, holding in its beak a sable ring, recalling a legend regarding John Hunyadi's son and his mother's ring (events linked to the city of Hunedoara).

== Counties incorporated ==
After the 1938 Administrative and Constitutional Reform, of the older 71 counties Ținutul Timiș incorporated 5:

- Arad County
- Caraș County
- Hunedoara County
- Severin County
- Timiș-Torontal County

== See also ==
- Historical administrative divisions of Romania
- Vest (development region)
- Banat
- History of Transylvania
- History of Romania
