= Ținutul Olt =

Ținutul Olt Ținutul Jiu
- Land (Ținut)
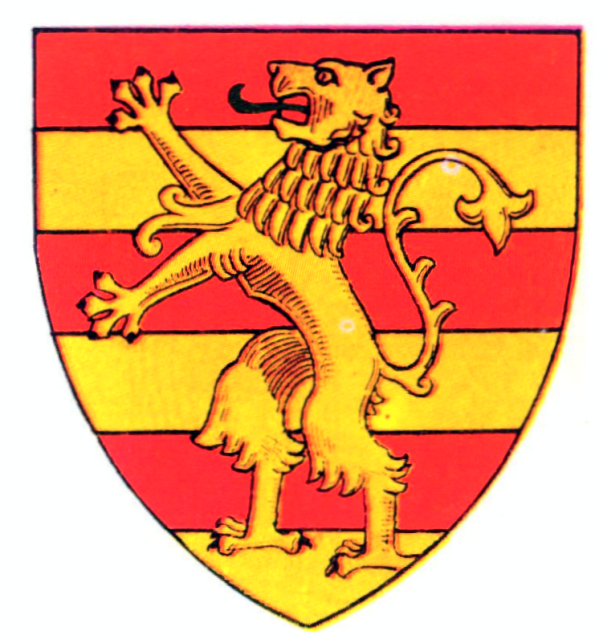
- Coat of arms

- Country: Romania
- Former counties included: Dolj County, Gorj County, Mehedinți County, Olt County, Romanați County, Vâlcea County
- Historic region: Wallachia (Oltenia)
- Capital city (Reședință de ținut): Craiova
- Established: 14 August 1938
- Ceased to exist: 22 September 1940

Government
  - Type: Rezident Regal
- Time zone: UTC+2 (EET)
  - Summer (DST): UTC+3 (EEST)

Ținutul Olt (draft version: Ținutul Jiu) was one of the ten Romanian ținuturi ("lands") founded in 1938, after King Carol II initiated an institutional reform by modifying the 1923 Constitution and the law of territorial administration. Roughly corresponding to the historical region of Oltenia and named after the Olt River and the Jiu River, it had its capital in the city of Craiova. Ținutul Olt ceased to exist following the territorial losses of Romania to the Axis powers and the king's abdication in 1940.

== Coat of arms ==
The coat of arms consists of six bars, three of gules and three of or, representing the former seven counties (județe) of Greater Romania (71 in total) which it had included. Over the bars there is an or lion rampant langued and armed sable, facing dexter (the symbol of Oltenia).

== Counties incorporated ==
After the 1938 Administrative and Constitutional Reform, out of the older 71 counties, Ținutul Olt incorporated 6 of them:

- Dolj County
- Gorj County
- Mehedinți County
- Olt County
- Romanați County
- Vâlcea County

== See also ==
- Historical administrative divisions of Romania
- Sud-Vest (development region)
- History of Romania
