= Făgăraș County =

Coordinates: 45.8407°N 24.9718°E

Județul Făgăraș
- County (Județ)
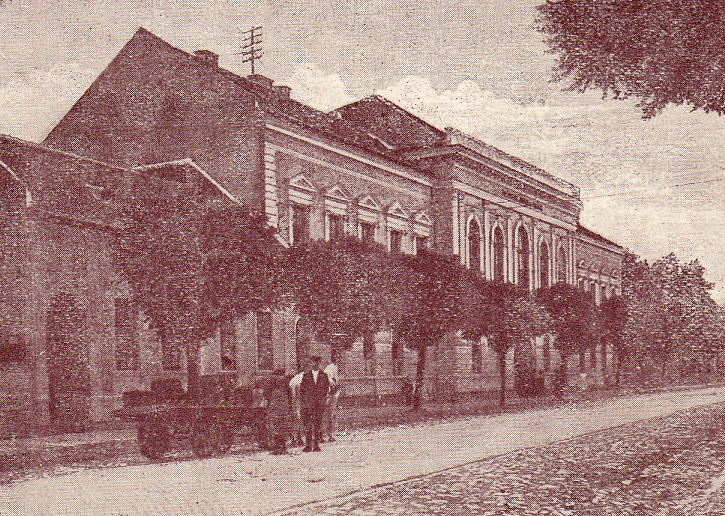
- The Făgăraș County prefect's building from the interwar period, now Făgăraș police headquarters.

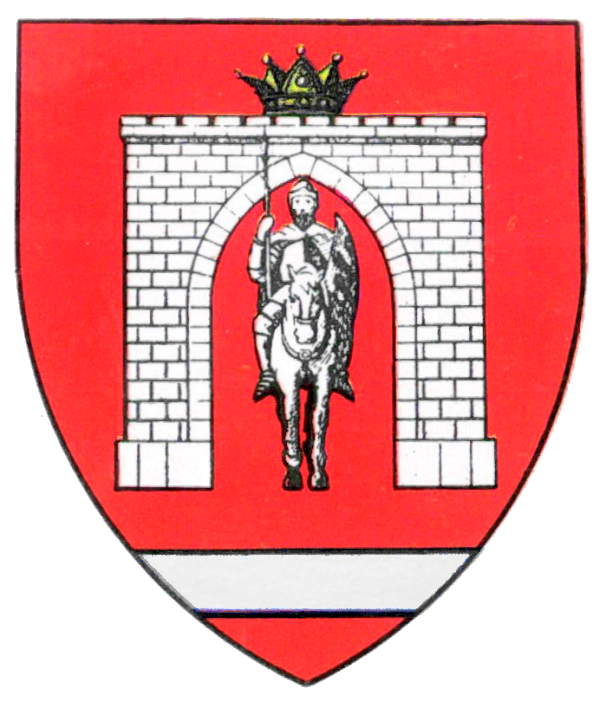
- Coat of arms

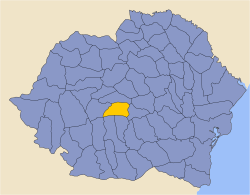
- Country: Romania
- Historic region: Transylvania
- Capital city (Reședință de județ): Făgăraș
- Established: 1925
- Ceased to exist: Administrative reform of 1950

Area
  - Total: 2,432 km^{2} (939 sq mi)

Population (1930)
  - Total: 86,039
  - Density: 35.38/km^{2} (91.63/sq mi)
- Time zone: UTC+2 (EET)
  - Summer (DST): UTC+3 (EEST)

Făgăraș County is one of the historic counties of Transylvania, Romania. The county seat was Făgăraș.

== Geography ==
Făgăraș County covered 2,432 square kilometres (939 sq mi) and was located in the central part of Greater Romania, in the southeastern part of Transylvania, along the Olt River. Currently, the territory that comprised Făgăraș County is now mostly included in Brașov County, while its western part belongs now to Sibiu County.

== History ==
After World War I, as a result of the Treaty of Trianon, Fogaras County along with most of Transylvania was transferred from the Kingdom of Hungary to Romania, Făgăraş County was created with an identical territory. Based on the 1923 Romanian Constitution and the Law of Administrative Unification of 1925, the name of the county remained as it was, but the territory was reorganized. Its capital remained Făgăraș. The new county divided into three administrative districts (Romanian: plăși), it neighbored Târnava-Mare County to the north, Brașov County to the east, Muscel and Argeș counties to the south, and Sibiu County to the west. In 1938, the county was disestablished and incorporated into the newly formed Ținutul Mureș, but it was re-established in 1940 after the fall of Carol II's regime. In World War II, the county was invaded and occupied by Soviet forces. As in other parts of the country in 1945, part of the Saxon population of Făgăraş County was deported to the Soviet Union, where some survivors returned after about five years.

Following the administrative and territorial reform of 1950, made after the Soviet model, all counties were abolished and regions and districts established. The territory of the county then became part of Țara Făgărașului. On 17 February 1968 the administrative and territorial divisions were returned to counties, but Făgăraș County was not re-established. The territory Țara Făgărașului was divided between the counties of Brașov and Sibiu.

== Administrative organization ==
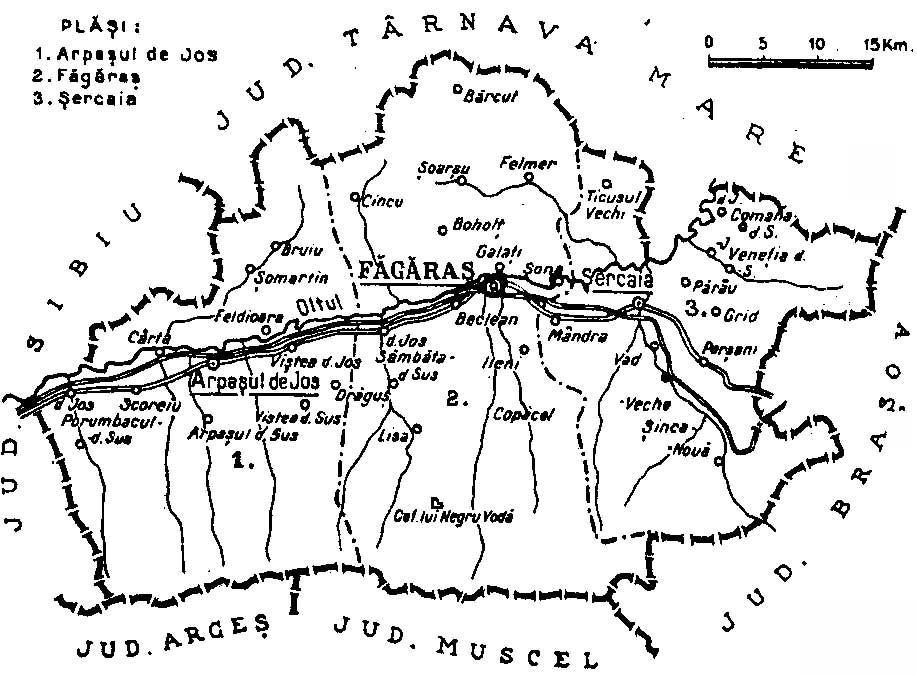
Map of Făgăraș County as constituted in 1938

Administratively, Făgăraș County was divided into three districts (plăși):

1. Plasa Arpașu de Jos, headquartered at Arpașu de Jos
2. Plasa Făgăraș, headquartered at Făgăraș
3. Plasa Șercaia, headquartered at Șercaia

== Population ==
According to the 1930 census data, the county population was 86,039 inhabitants, ethnically divided as follows: 78.3% Romanians, 12.5% Germans, 5.5% Hungarians, 2.9% Romanies, as well as other minorities. From the religious point of view, the population was 55.2% Eastern Orthodox, 25.7% Greek Catholics, 12.9% Lutheran, as well as other minorities.

=== Urban population ===
In 1930, the county's urban population was 7,841 inhabitants, comprising 54.2% Romanians, 26.7% Hungarians, 12.4% Germans, 4.9% Jews, as well as other minorities. From the religious point of view, the urban population was composed of 34.9% Eastern Orthodox, 19.7% Greek Catholic, 14.4% Reformed, 13.5% Roman Catholic, 9.9% Lutheran, 5.0% Jewish, 2.3% Unitarian, as well as other minorities.
