= Ținutul Mării =

Ținutul Mării Ținutul Marea / Ținutul Mărei
- Land (Ținut)
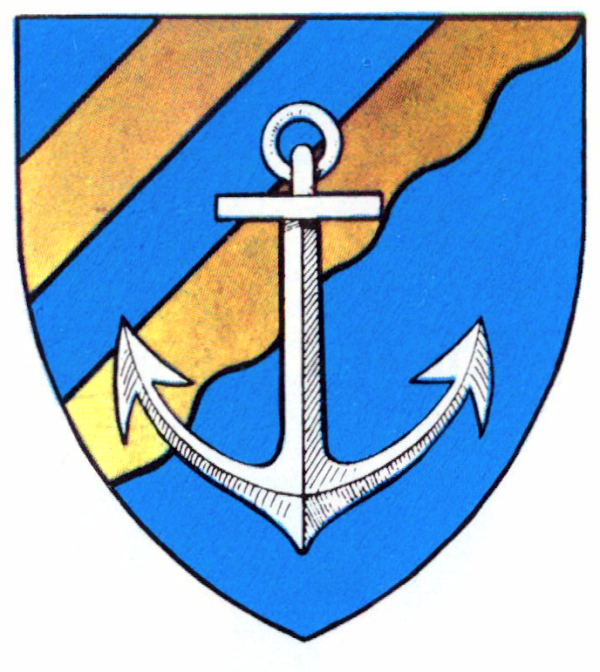
- Coat of arms

- Country: Romania
- Former counties included: Caliacra County, Constanța County, Durostor County, Ialomița County
- Historic region: Dobruja (parts of Northern Dobruja, Southern Dobruja), parts of Wallachia
- Capital city (Reședință de ținut): Constanța
- Established: 14 August 1938
- Ceased to exist: 22 September 1940

Government
  - Type: Rezident Regal
- Time zone: UTC+2 (EET)
  - Summer (DST): UTC+3 (EEST)

Ținutul Mării (alternatively spelled as Marea or Mărei) was one of the ten ținuturi ("lands") of Romania, founded in 1938 after King Carol II initiated an institutional reform by modifying the 1923 Constitution and the law of territorial administration. It included parts of Wallachia, central Dobruja (the southern half of Northern Dobruja) and the entire Southern Dobruja. It was named after the Black Sea, and had its capital in the city of Constanța. Ținutul Mării ceased to exist following the territorial losses to the Kingdom of Bulgaria and the king's abdication in 1940.

== Coat of arms ==
The coat of arms was party per bend sinister by a wavy bend sinister. The dexter consists of four bends, two of azure and two of or, representing the former four counties of the Greater Romania (71 in total), which it had included. The sinister is plain azure field. Over the shield there is an argent anchor, in reference to the ports on the seaside.

== Counties incorporated ==
After the 1938 Administrative and Constitutional Reform, of the older 71 counties, Ținutul Mării included 4:

- Caliacra County
- Constanța County
- Durostor County
- Ialomița County

== See also ==
- Historical administrative divisions of Romania
- Sud-Est (development region)
- History of Romania
