= Roman County =

Județul Roman
- County (Județ)
- Coat of arms

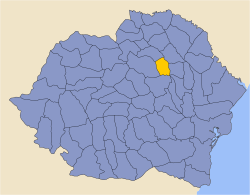
- Country: Romania
- Historic region: Moldavia
- Capital city (Reședință de județ): Roman
- Established: 1925
- Ceased to exist: Administrative reform of 1950

Area
  - Total: 1,880 km^{2} (730 sq mi)

Population (1930)
  - Total: 151,550
  - Density: 80.6/km^{2} (209/sq mi)
- Time zone: UTC+2 (EET)
  - Summer (DST): UTC+3 (EEST)

Roman County is one of the historic counties of Moldavia, Romania. The county seat was Roman.

In 1938, the county was disestablished and incorporated into the newly formed Ținutul Prut, but it was re-established in 1940 after the fall of Carol II's regime - only to be abolished 10 years later by the Communist regime.

== Geography ==
Roman County covered 1,880 km^{2} and was located in the central-north-eastern part of Greater Romania in the center of Moldavia. Currently, the territory that comprised Roman County is now mostly included in the Neamț County, with some parts in the Iași. Bacău, and Vaslui counties. In the interwar period, the county neighbored Baia County to the north, Iași and Vaslui counties to the east, Tutova County to the southeast, Bacău County to the south, and Neamț County to the west.

== Administrative organization ==
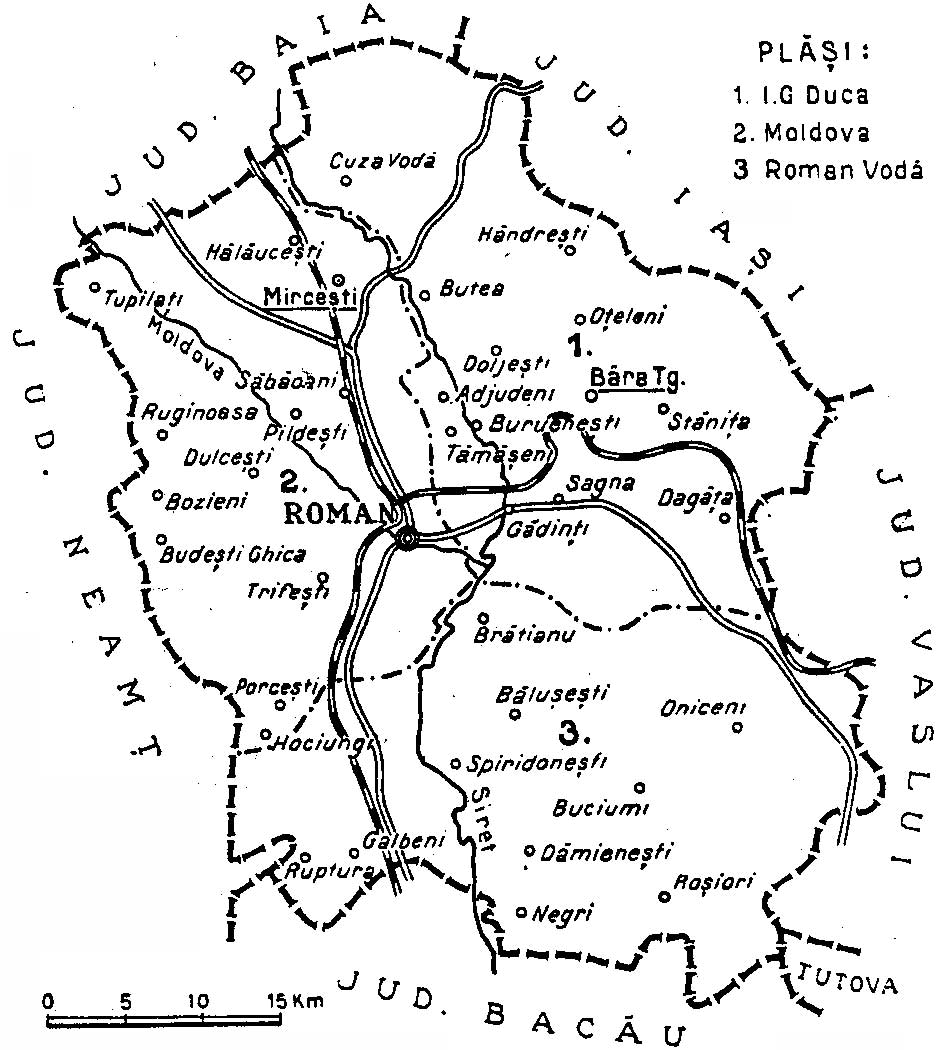
Map of Roman County as constituted in 1938.

Administratively, in 1930, Roman County was divided into two districts (plăși):

1. Plasa Miron Costin
2. Plasa Roman Vodă

Later, Plasa Miron Costin was divided into two districts:

1. Plasa I.G. Duca
2. Plasa Moldova

== Population ==
According to the census data of 1930, the county numbered 151,550 inhabitants, ethnically 90.7% Romanians, 4.7% Jews, 2.3% Romanies, 1.4% Hungarians, as well as other minorities. From a religious point of view, the population consisted of 73.2% Eastern Orthodox, 21.4% Roman Catholic, 4.9% Jewish, as well as other minorities.

=== Urban population ===
The urban population consisted of 71.9% Romanians, 20.6% Jews, 2.1% Romanies, 1.4% Germans, 1.3% Hungarians, as well as other minorities. From a religious point of view, the urban population consisted of 73.8% Eastern Orthodox, 20.9% Jewish, 3.7% Roman Catholic, as well as other minorities.
