= Durostor County =

Județul Durostor
- County (Județ)
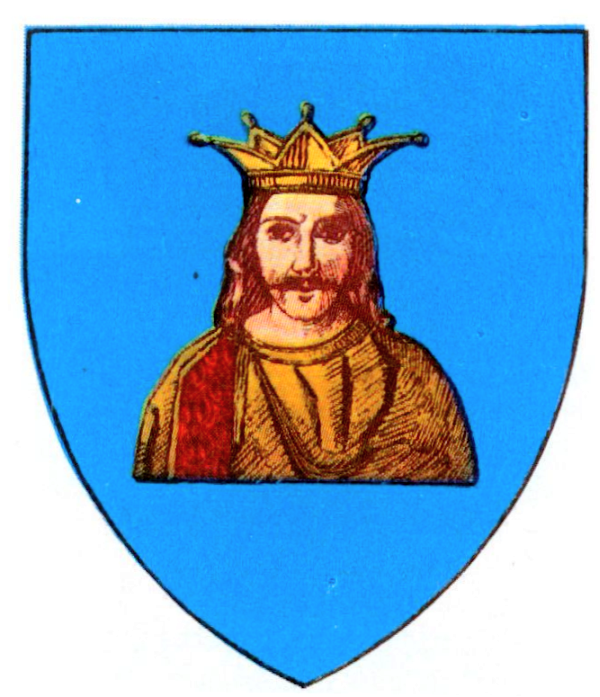
- Coat of arms

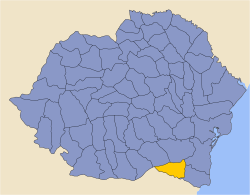
- Country: Romania
- Historic region: Southern Dobruja
- County seat (Reședință de județ): Dârstor
- Established: After the Treaty of Bucharest (1913)
- Ceased to exist: Administrative and Constitutional Reform in 1938

Area
  - Total: 3,226 km^{2} (1,246 sq mi)

Population (1930)
  - Total: 211,433
  - Density: 65.54/km^{2} (169.7/sq mi)
- Time zone: UTC+2 (EET)
  - Summer (DST): UTC+3 (EEST)

Durostor County was a county (județ) of the Kingdom of Romania, in Southern Dobruja, with the seat at Dârstor.

The county was located in the south-eastern part of Greater Romania, in the southern Dobrogea region, known as Cadrilater. Currently the territory of the former county is split between Bulgaria and Romania; in Bulgaria, the former county's territory belongs to Silistra Province, the eastern part of the former county remained within territory of Romania constituting the territory around Ostrov in today's Constanța County.

The county consisted of 4 districts (plăși): Accadânlar, Curtbunar, Silistra, and Turtucaia. The county was neighbored by the counties of Ilfov and Ialomița to the north, Caliacra and Constanța to the east, and the Kingdom of Bulgaria to the south.

== History ==
As a result of Romania's involvement in the Second Balkan War, the part of the Cadrilater north of the Turtucaia – Balcic line was annexed by Romania in 1913, despite criticism on the a part of the political opposition, e.g., the socialist Constantin Dobrogeanu-Gherea, who appreciated that this act would create for Romania a new and fierce enemy over a 600 km (370 mi) frontier on its southern flank, in Bulgaria which had, until then, been a friendly country whose independence had been obtained simultaneously with Romania's.

After the annexation of the Cadrilater to Romania, Durostor County, headquartered in Silistra, was established in the same year. Bulgaria managed to regain it between 1916 and 1918, but then lost it again after the end of World War I (see Treaty of Neuilly). Durostor County, together with the rest of the Cadrilater, remained with Romania until 1940, when the Treaty of Craiova of September 7 returned to Bulgaria as an indirect consequence of Nazi German political pressure on the Romanian government.

== Etymology ==
The county was named after the Roman name of Silistra, Durostorum.

== Coat of arms ==
The Coat of Arms depicted Mircea the Elder.

== Population ==
According to the Romanian census of 1930 the population of Durostor County was 211,433, of which 42.8% were ethnic Turks, 34.2% ethnic Bulgarians, 19.0% ethnic Romanians, 1.4% Romanies, as well as other minorities. Classified by religion: 54.0% Orthodox Christian, 45.1% Islam, as well as other minorities.

By 1937, the population was estimated to have risen to 230,309.

== Administrative organization ==
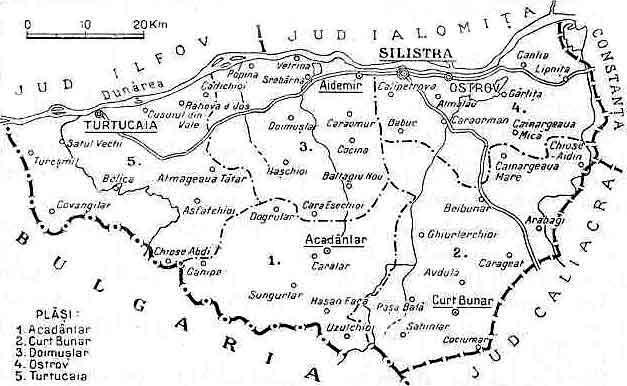
Map of Durostor County as constituted in 1938.

The county's capital was the town of Silistra (sometimes referred to by an antiquated Romanian name, Dârstor). Other urban centres were the towns of Ostrov and Turtucaia. The territory of the county was divided into five districts (plăși):

1. Plasa Accadânlar, headquartered in Accadânlar (with 48 villages)
2. Plasa Curtbunar, headquartered in Curtbunar (with 41 villages)
3. Plasa Silistra, headquartered in Silistra or Doimușlar (with 33 villages)
4. Plasa Turtucaia, headquartered in Turtucaia (with 43 villages)
5. Plasa Ostrov, headquartered in Ostrov (with 30 villages)

== After 1938 ==
After the 1938 Administrative and Constitutional Reform, the county was merged with the counties of Constanța, Caliacra, and Ialomița to form Ținutul Mării.

On September 7, 1940, the former county (except for the north-eastern corner comprising Ostrov and Lipnița communes) with the whole Southern Dobruja was returned to Bulgaria (see Treaty of Craiova).

== See also ==
- History of Romania
- History of Bulgaria
- Silistra Nouă County
