= Ținutul Bucegi =

Ținutul Bucegi Ținutul Argeș
- Land (Ținut)
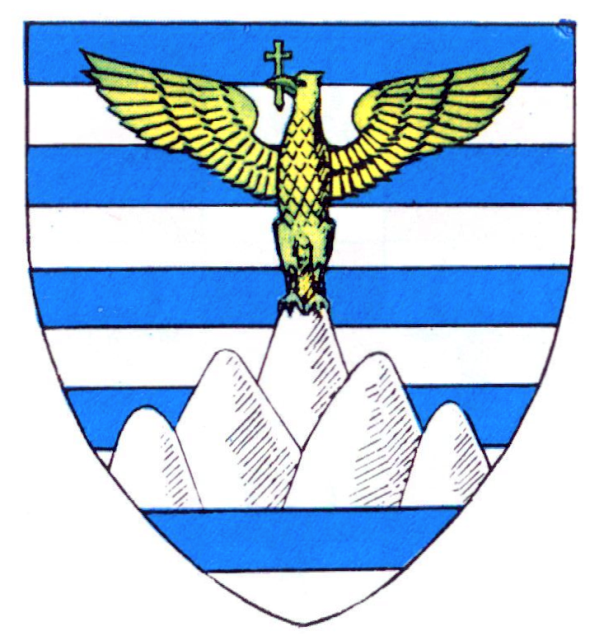
- Coat of arms

- Country: Romania
- Former counties included: Argeș County, Brașov County, Buzău County, Dâmbovița County, Ilfov County, Muscel County, Prahova County, Teleorman County, Trei Scaune County, Vlașca County
- Historic region: Wallachia (Muntenia) and parts of Transylvania
- Capital city (Reședință de ținut): Bucharest
- Established: 14 August 1938
- Ceased to exist: 22 September 1940

Government
  - Type: Rezident Regal
- Time zone: UTC+2 (EET)
  - Summer (DST): UTC+3 (EEST)

Ținutul Bucegi (draft version: Ținutul Argeș) was one of the ten Romanian ținuturi ("lands") founded in 1938, after King Carol II initiated an institutional reform by modifying the 1923 Constitution and the law of territorial administration. Named after the Bucegi Mountains and extending over historical areas of Wallachia and South-Eastern Transylvania, it had its capital in the city of Bucharest. Ținutul Bucegi ceased to exist following the territorial losses of Romania (Second Vienna Award) and the king's abdication in 1940.

== Coat of arms ==
The coat of arms consisted of ten bars, five of azure and five of argent, representing the former ten counties (județe) of Greater Romania (71 in total in 1938) included in it, charged with or eagle wings displayed facing dexter with an or Latin cross in the beak (elements taken from Wallachia's historical coat of arms) standing over five peaks argent representing the Bucegi Mountains.

== Counties incorporated ==
After the 1938 Administrative and Constitutional Reform, out of the older 71 counties, Ținutul Bucegi incorporated 10:

- Argeș County
- Brașov County
- Buzău County
- Dâmbovița County
- Ilfov County
- Muscel County
- Prahova County
- Teleorman County
- Trei Scaune County
- Vlașca County

== See also ==
- Historical administrative divisions of Romania
- Sud (development region)
- History of Romania
