= Caraș County =

Județul Caraș
- County (Județ)
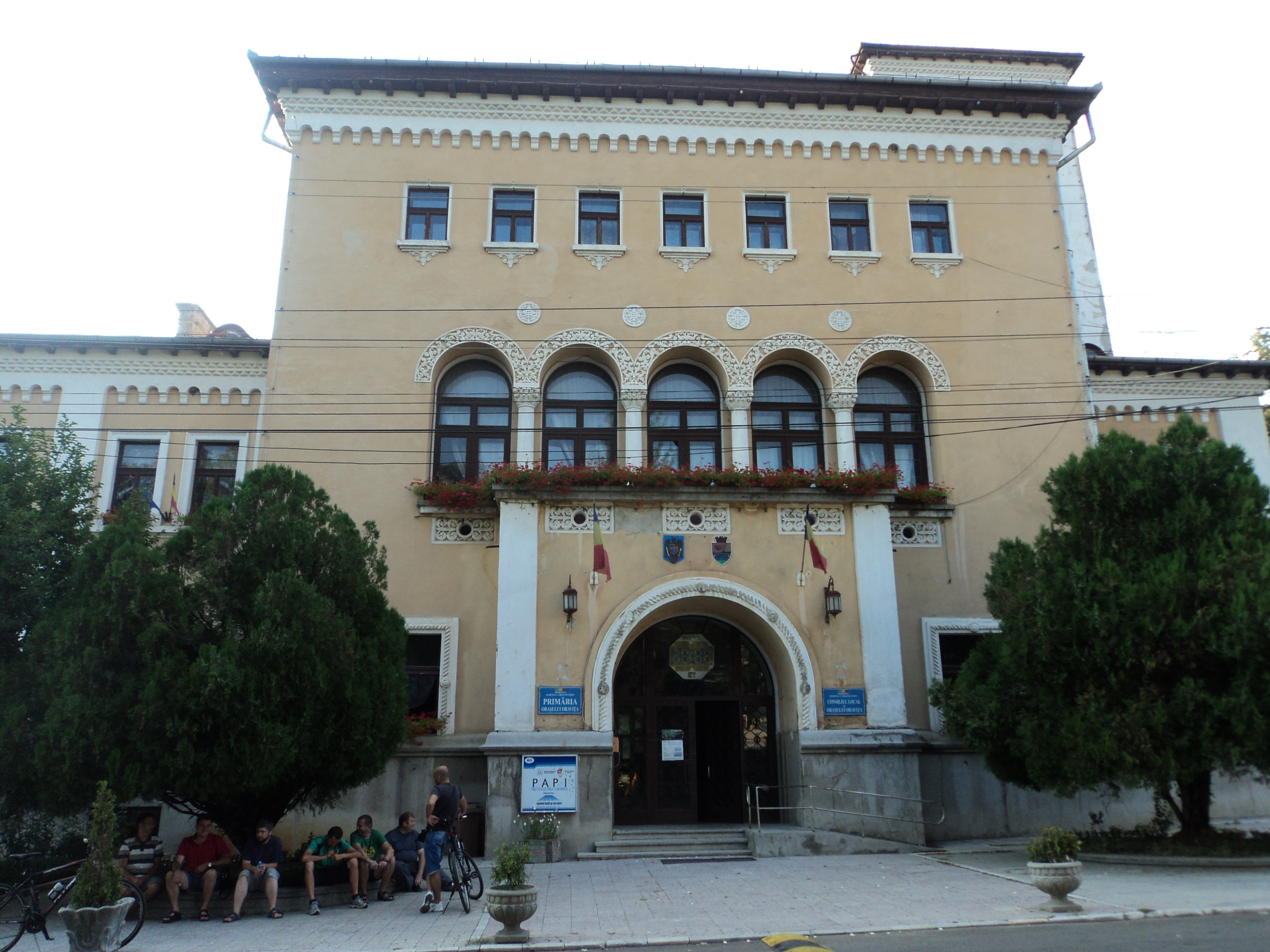
- The building of the prefecture of Caraș County in the interwar period, currently Oravița city hall.

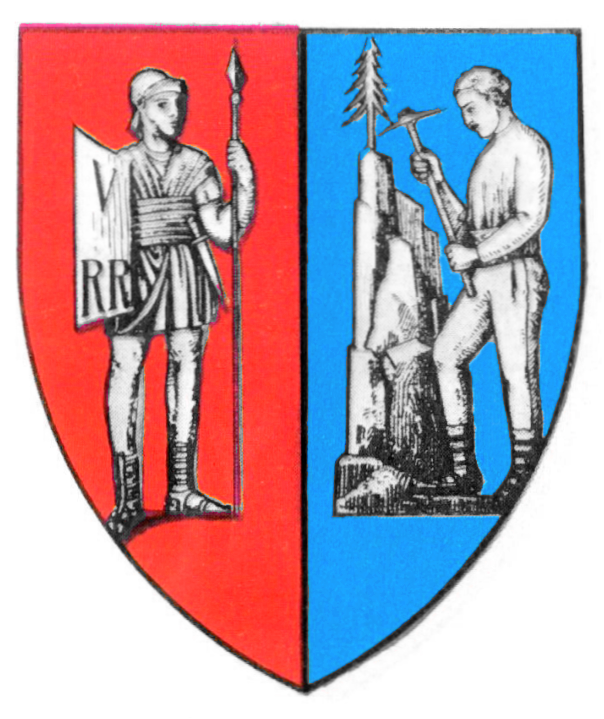
- Coat of arms

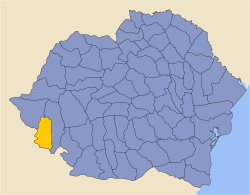
- Country: Romania
- Historic region: Banat
- Capital city (Reședință de județ): Oravița
- Established: 1925
- Ceased to exist: Administrative reform of 1950

Area
  - Total: 4,693 km^{2} (1,812 sq mi)

Population (1930)
  - Total: 200,929
  - Density: 42.81/km^{2} (110.9/sq mi)
- Time zone: UTC+2 (EET)
  - Summer (DST): UTC+3 (EEST)

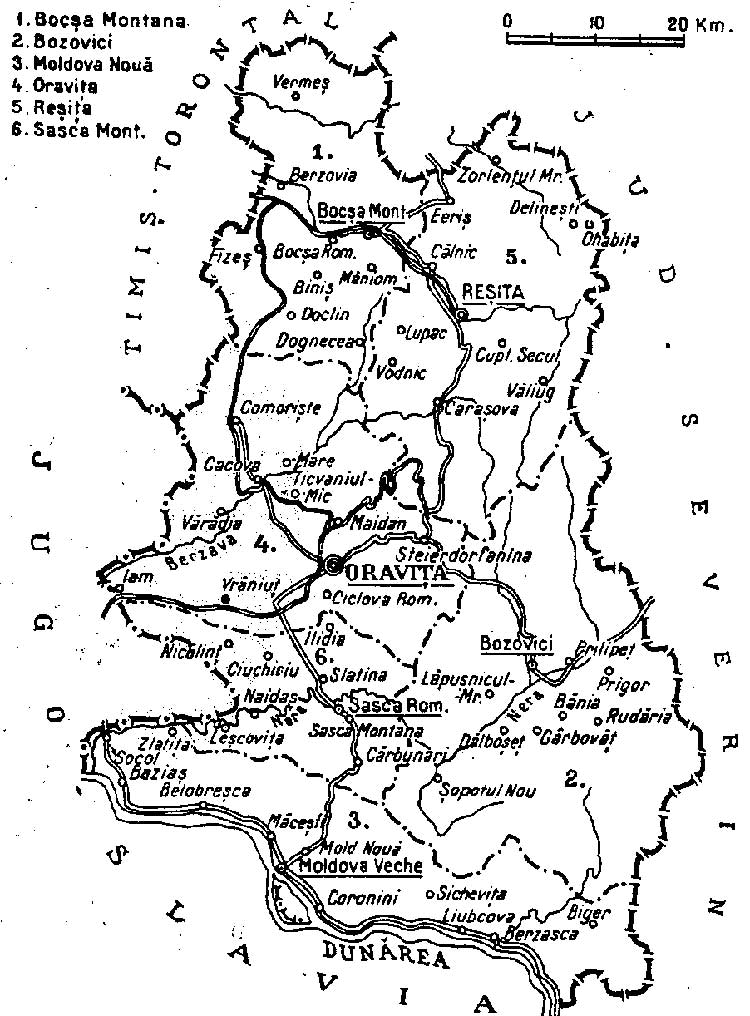
HMap of Caraș County as constituted in 1938.

Caraș County is one of the historic counties of Romania in the historic region of the Banat. The county seat was Oravița. The county was founded in 1926, following the division of the former Caraș-Severin County.

In 1938, the county was disestablished and incorporated into the newly formed Ținutul Timiș, but it was re-established in 1940 after the fall of Carol II's regime – only to be abolished 10 years later by the Communist regime on September 6, 1950.

== Geography ==
Caraș County covered 4,693 km^{2} and was located in the Banat region in the southwestern part of Greater Romania. Currently, the territory that comprised Caraș County is mostly now included in the reconstituted Caraș-Severin County. In the interwar period, the county neighbored Timiș-Torontal County to the north and northwest, Severin County to the east and northeast, and the Kingdom of Yugoslavia to the west, south, and southwest.

== Administrative organization ==
Administratively, Caraș County was originally divided into five districts (plăși):

1. Plasa Bocșa-Montană
2. Plasa Bozovici
3. Plasa Moldova-Nouă
4. Plasa Oravița
5. Plasa Reșița

Subsequently, a sixth district was established:

6. Plasa Sasca-Montană

The county contained two urban communes (cities): Oravița (the county's headquarters) and Reșița (the largest city of the county).

== Population ==
According to the 1930 census data, the county's population was 200,929, ethnically divided as follows: 69.5% Romanians, 12.8% Germans, 4.9% Serbs and Croats, 3.6% Czechs and Slovaks, 2.8% Romanies, 2.5% Hungarians, as well as other minorities. The county's population was divided religiously as follows: 70.3% Eastern Orthodox, 21.5% Roman Catholic, 5.1% Greek Catholic, 1.5% Baptist, as well as other minorities.

=== Urban population ===
In the year 1930, the county's urban population was 29,453, ethnically divided as follows: 43.4% Germans, 42.2% Romanians, 8.8% Hungarians, 1.6% Czechs and Slovaks, 1.4% Jews, as well as other minorities. From the religious point of view, the urban population consisted of 50.5% Roman Catholic, 39.7% Eastern Orthodox, 3.7% Greek Catholic, 2.1% Reformed, 1.7% Jewish, 1.6% Lutheran, as well as other minorities.
