= Ținutul Prut =

- Land (Ținut)
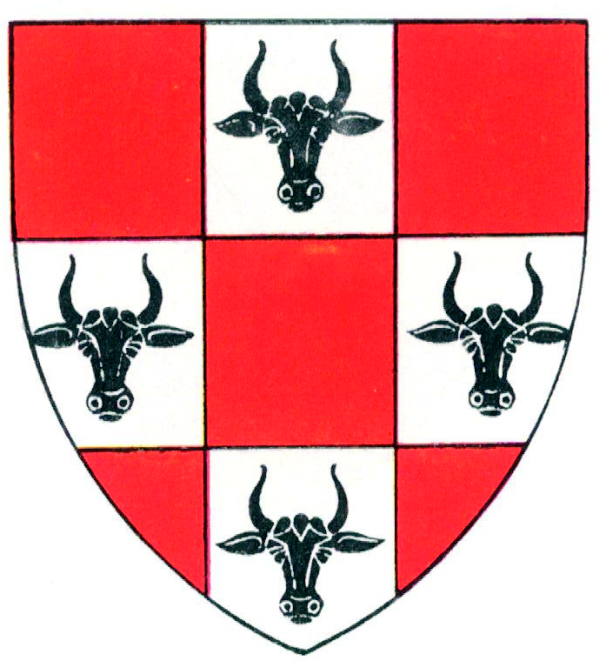
- Coat of arms

- Country: Romania
- Former counties included: Bacău County, Bălți County, Baia County, Botoșani County, Iași County, Neamț County, Roman County, Soroca County, Vaslui County
- Historic region: Moldavia (Western Moldavia and Bessarabia)
- Capital city (Reședință de ținut): Iași
- Established: 14 August 1938
- Ceased to exist: 22 September 1940

Government
  - Type: Rezident Regal
- Time zone: UTC+2 (EET)
  - Summer (DST): UTC+3 (EEST)

Ținutul Prut was one of the ten Romanian ținuturi ("lands"), founded in 1938 after King Carol II initiated an institutional reform by modifying the 1923 Constitution and the law of territorial administration. It comprised parts of central Moldavia (and central Bessarabia), and was named after the Prut River; its capital was the city of Iași. Ținutul Prut ceased to exist following the territorial losses of Romania to the Soviet Union and the king's abdication in 1940.

== Coat of arms ==
The coat of arms is party per cross in nine equal squares, representing the former nine counties (județe) of Greater Romania (71 in total) which it included. The four of the squares forming the arms of the cross are of argent; all other squares are gules. The four argent squares bear a sable aurochs head (the symbol of Moldavia - see Flag and coat of arms of Moldavia).

== Counties incorporated ==
After the 1938 Administrative and Constitutional Reform, of the older 71 counties Ținutul Prut included 9:

- Bacău County
- Bălți County
- Baia County
- Botoșani County
- Iași County
- Neamț County
- Roman County
- Soroca County
- Vaslui County

== See also ==
- Historical administrative divisions of Romania
- Nord-Est (development region)
- History of Romania
- History of Moldova
