= Rădăuți County =

Județul Rădăuți
- County (Județ)
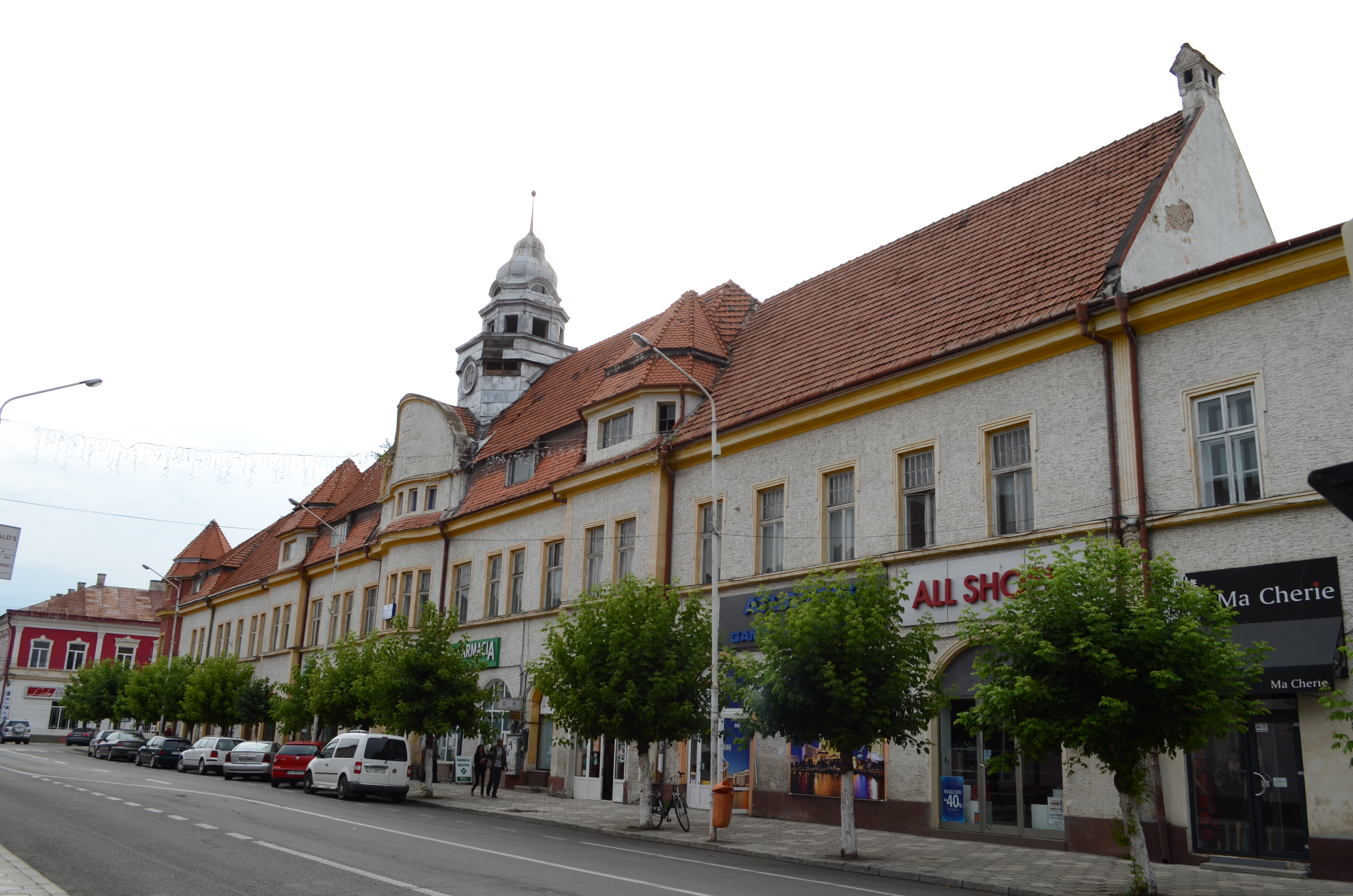
- Rădăuți County prefecture building of the interwar period.

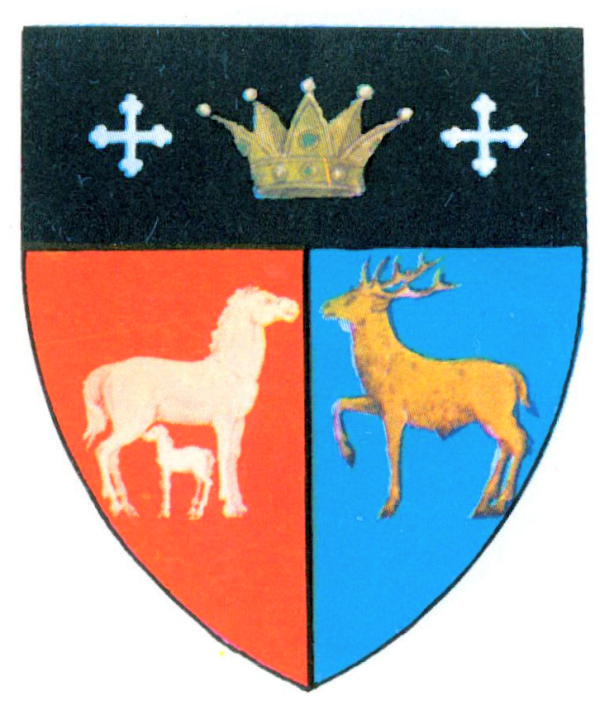
- Coat of arms

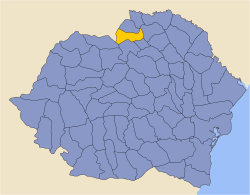
- Country: Romania
- Historic region: Bukovina
- Capital city (Reședință de județ): Rădăuți
- Established: 1925
- Ceased to exist: Administrative reform of 1950

Area
  - Total: 2,360 km^{2} (910 sq mi)

Population (1930)
  - Total: 160,778
  - Density: 68.1/km^{2} (176/sq mi)
- Time zone: UTC+2 (EET)
  - Summer (DST): UTC+3 (EEST)

Rădăuți County was one of the historic counties of Bukovina, Romania. The county seat was Rădăuți.

== History ==
Following the Union of Bukovina with Romania decided by the General Congress of Bukovina on 15/28 November 1918, the Rădăuți County was created on 18 December 1918 by the Decree No. 3715 for the administration of Bukovina.

In 1925, according to the Law of Administrative Unification of 14 June 1925, the territory of the county was enlarged in the east with the former Siret County and in northwest with parts of the former Vijnița County.

In 1938, the county was abolished and incorporated into the newly formed Ținutul Suceava.

In 1940, following the Molotov–Ribbentrop Pact and the Soviet ultimatum on 26 June 1940, Northern Bukovina (including the north and northwestern parts of the Rădăuți County) was occupied by the Soviet Union and incorporated into the USSR (Chernivtsi Oblast, Ukrainian SSR). Rădăuți County (with its reduced territory) was re-established in September 1940 (after the fall of Carol II's regime) and completely re-instated (as part of the Bukovina Governorate) after Northern Bukovina was recovered by Romania in July 1941, following the invasion of the Soviet Union. Nevertheless, in August 1944 the Northern Bukovina was taken over again by the Soviet Army and the borders as of 1 January 1941 were confirmed by the 1947 Paris Peace Treaties.

It has been argued that the majority of Rădăuți's Jewish population was exterminated during the Holocaust. However, a Romanian official document from 1946 suggests that most Jews in Rădăuți County survived the Holocaust. Persecutions became widespread around 1938, when Jews were harassed and attacked by authorities under the Octavian Goga government; they were confirmed by anti-Semitic legislation passed by the Ion Gigurtu cabinet, and, in late 1940, exceptionally violent following the establishment of the National Legionary State. In October 1941, all Jews present in Rădăuți, from the city itself and throughout the county (8,000 people), were deported to ghettos and concentration camps in Transnistria Governorate. It has been argued that only 4,000 members of the Rădăuți Jewish community survived the Holocaust. This number did not include the other urban Jewish community in the county (Siret); in 1941, there were originally more than 5,000 Jews in the city of Rădăuți. On March 14, 1944, Romania's military dictator Ion Antonescu allowed the repatriation of all the Jews deported to Transnistria.

Rădăuți County was ultimately abolished in 1950 by the Communist regime.

== Geography ==
Rădăuți County covered 2,360 km^{2} and was located in Bukovina. The territory that comprised Rădăuți County is now included in Suceava County, while its northwestern part now belongs to Ukraine. In the interwar period, the county neighbored Storojineț County to the north, Dorohoi County to the east, Suceava and Câmpulung to the south, Maramureș County to the southwest, and Poland (Stanisławów Voivodeship) to the west and northwest.

== Administrative organization ==
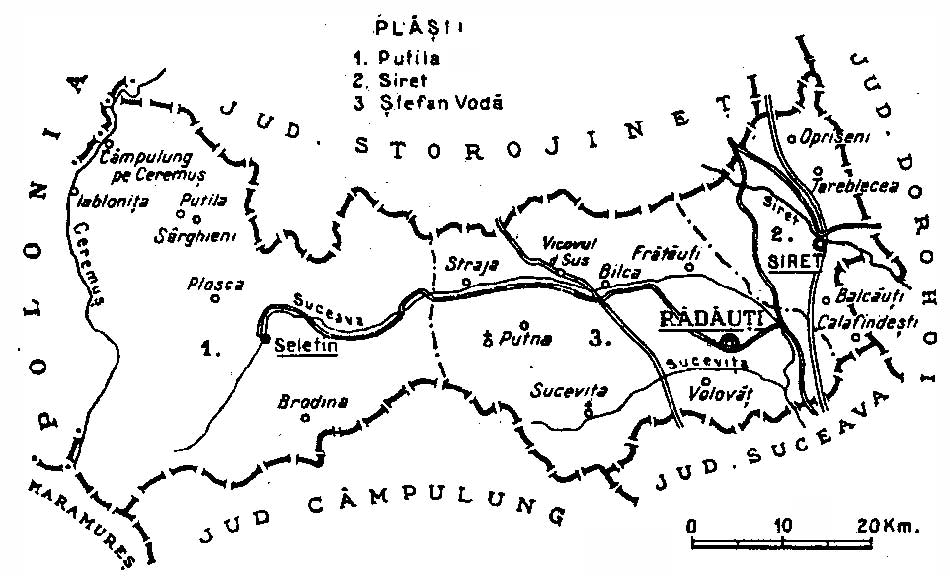
Map of Rădăuți County as constituted in 1938.

Administratively, Rădăuți County was divided into three districts (plăși):

1. Plasa Putila, with headquarters at Seletin.
2. Plasa Siret, with headquarters at Siret.
3. Plasa Ștefan Vodă, with headquarters at Rădăuți.

== Population ==
According to the Romanian census of 1930 the population of Rădăuți County was 160,778, of which 55.4% were ethnic Romanians, 11.1% Germans, 8.7% Ukrainians, 7.6% Hutsuls, 7.2% Jews, 6.4% Hungarians, 1.4% Poles, as well as other minorities. Classified by religion: 70.6% were Eastern Orthodox, 16.2% Roman Catholic, 7.2% Jewish, 2.6% Lutheran, 1.3% Greek Catholic, as well as other minorities.

=== Urban population ===
In 1930 the urban population of Rădăuți County was 26,693 (the city of Rădăuţi had 16,788 inhabitants, and Siret had 9,905), which included 38.3% Romanians, 28.9% Jews, 23.5% Germans, 4.7% Ukrainians, 1.8% of Poles, as well as other minorities, by ethnicity. The religious mix of the urban population was 41.3% Eastern Orthodox, 29.1% Jewish, 23.6% Roman Catholic, 3.4% Greek Catholic, 2.2% Lutheran, as well as other minorities.

== Gallery ==
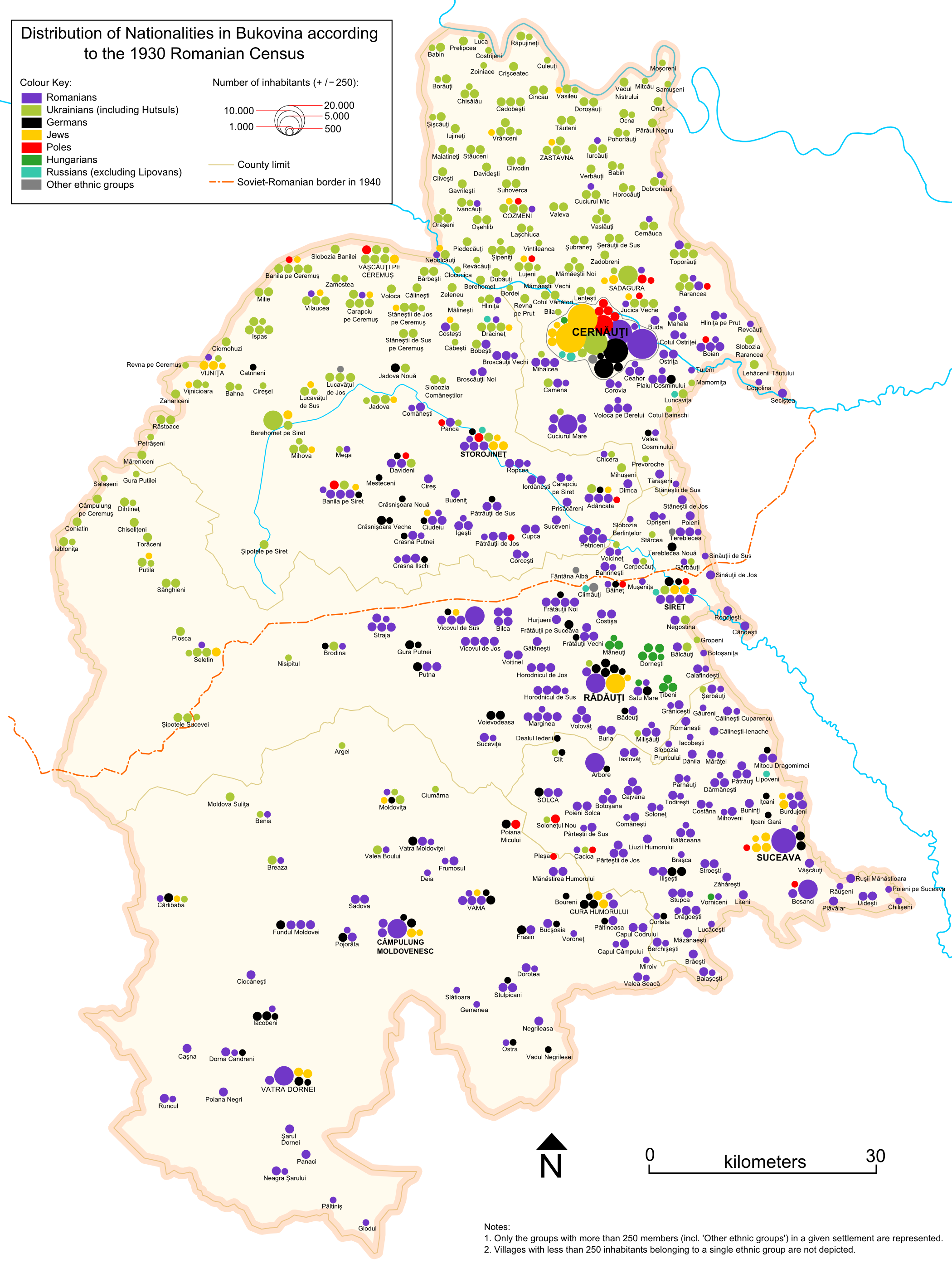
Demographic composition of Bukovina in 1930, with the 1940 border drawn in the centre

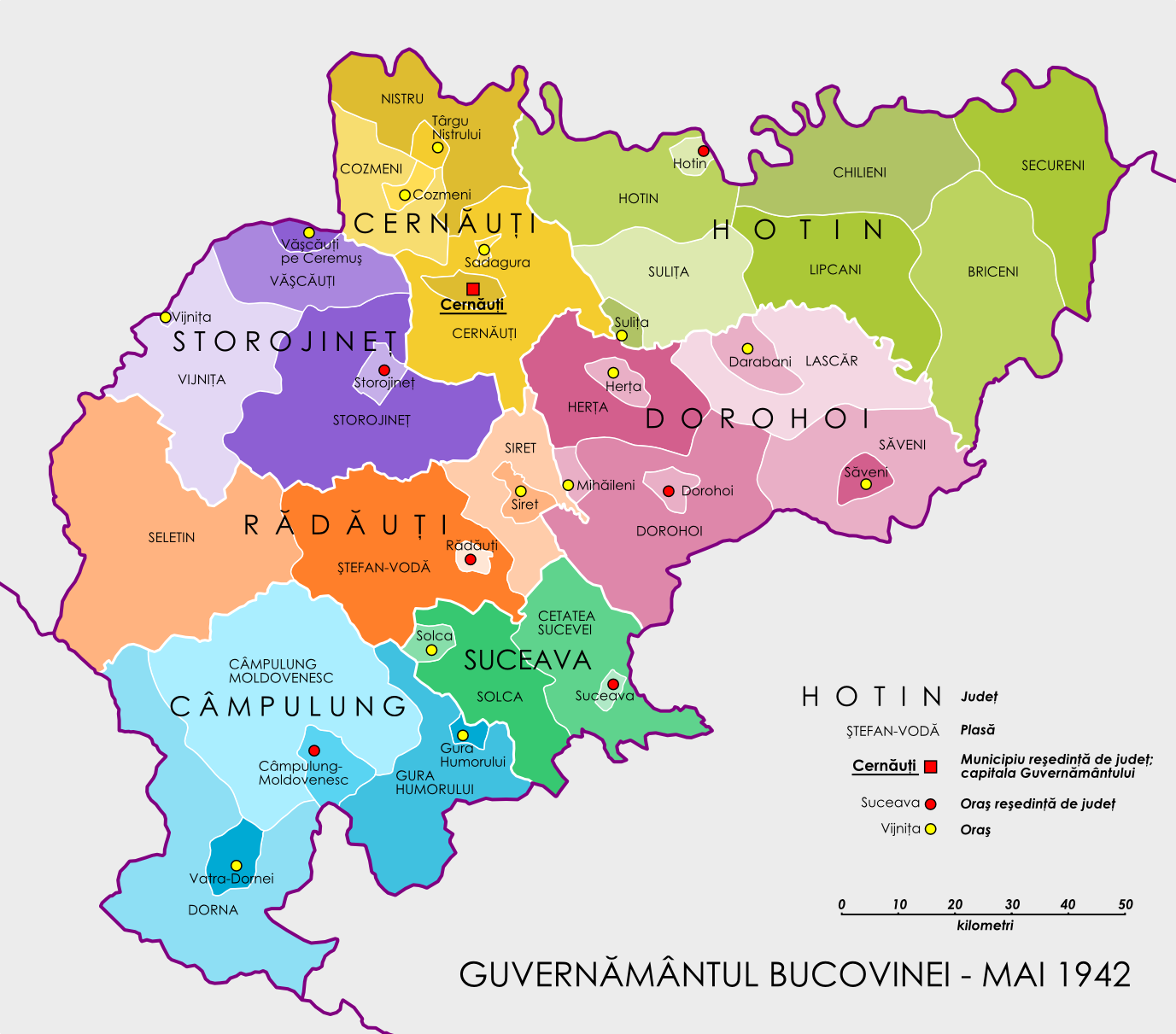
Governorate of Bukovina (1942)
