= Bukovina Governorate =

Romanian autonomous province existent during World War II

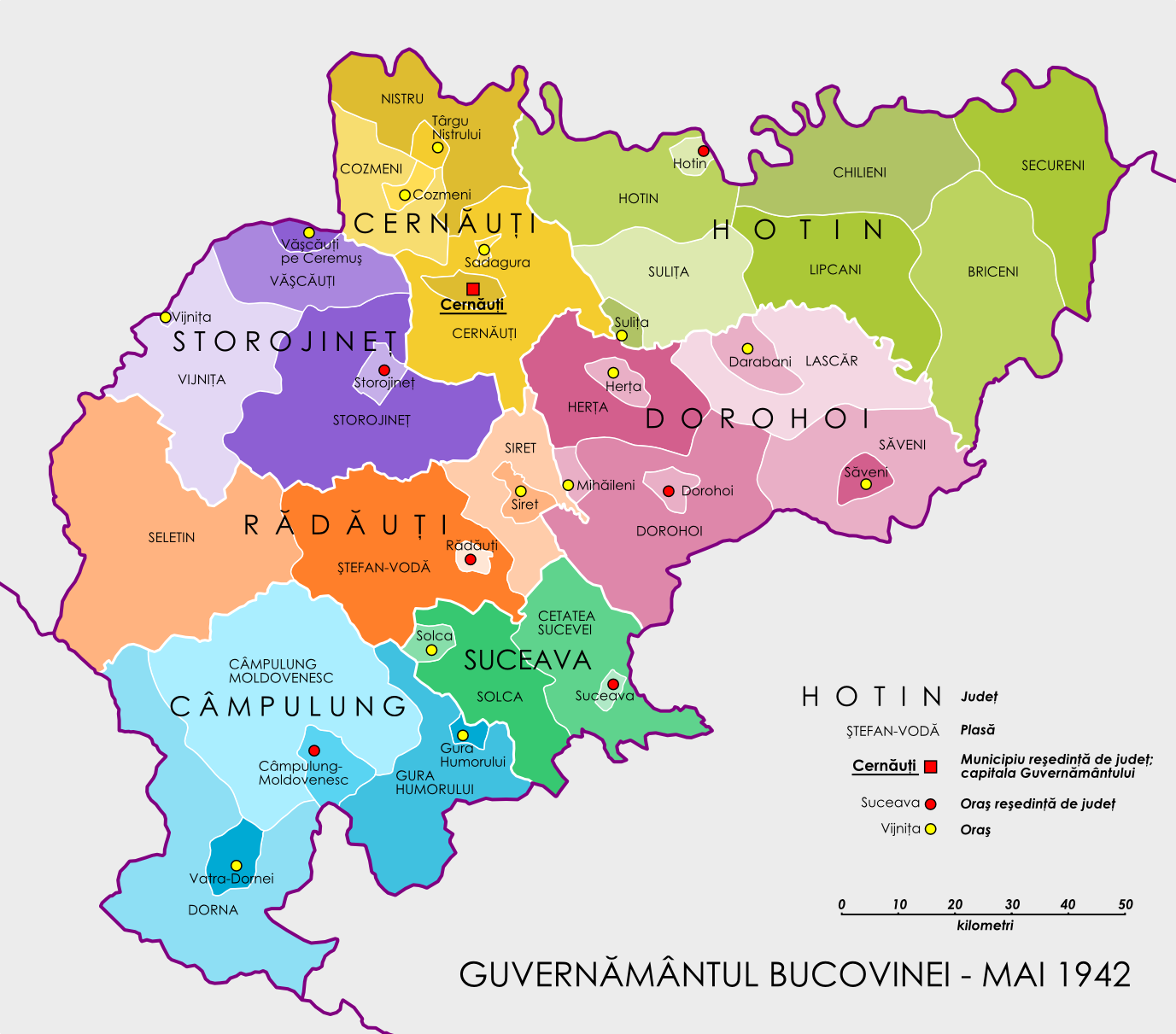
Administrative divisions of the Bukovina Governorate

The Bukovina Governorate (Romanian: Guvernământul Bucovinei) was an administrative unit of Romania during World War II.

== Background and history ==
In 1775, the region of Bukovina, historically part of the Romanian principality of Moldavia, officially became part of the Austrian Habsburg monarchy after having invaded it one year earlier, which would start a strong process of Ukrainization. Years later, in 1812, Moldavia also lost Bessarabia to the Russian Empire. In 1859, Moldavia united with another Romanian principality, Wallachia, creating the first modern Romanian state. During World War I, Romania was promised the obtaining of, among other territories, Bukovina as a condition for entering the war. It ended in victory for the country, and Bukovina declared unification with Romania on 28 November 1918.

The earlier incorporation of another territory, Bessarabia, into Romania, strained relations between the country and the newly-formed Soviet Union (USSR). Romania tried to defend and secure its new borders during the interwar period with the help of France and the United Kingdom (UK), but at the start of World War II, Romania was left defenseless and in a 1940 ultimatum, the Soviet Union demanded and occupied Bessarabia and also Northern Bukovina as "compensation" for the "great loss brought to the Bessarabian population".

After this, Romania joined the Axis powers following forced territorial adjustments with Hungary and Bulgaria. This alliance would invade the Soviet Union on 22 June 1941, although Romanian military operations only began on 2 July. After a few weeks, Bessarabia and Northern Bukovina were recaptured and integrated back into Romania. Subsequently, the Transnistria Governorate would also be established, but it was never formally annexed unlike the other two regions.

Although Bukovina and Bessarabia were already under Romanian control again, it was decided that the regions would not be fully integrated within the country, but that they would rather remain as autonomous regions ruled by a governor (governorates). The five Romanian interwar counties of the region of Bukovina (Câmpulung, Cernăuți, Rădăuți, Storojineț and Suceava), as well as the Hotin County of northern Bessarabia, formed the new Bukovina Governorate, to which the Dorohoi County (in Western Moldavia) was posteriorly attached in October 1941. It had three governors: Alexandru Rioșanu, who died in office; Corneliu Calotescu and Corneliu Dragalina. The capital of the governorate was Cernăuți (now known as Chernivtsi).

Ion Antonescu, the Conducător ("Leader") of Romania, had convinced himself that Nazi Germany would win the war until the Battle of Stalingrad, which was a defeat for the Axis. He realized after this that German victory would be unviable and began to reinforce the east of the country. The subsequent developments of the war forced Antonescu to make an evacuation plan for the Bukovina Governorate, as well as for the Bessarabia Governorate, the rest of the region of Moldavia and the Transnistria Governorate. This plan was called "Operation 1111", divided in three suboperations: "Operation 1111 A" for Bessarabia and Transnistria, "Operation 1111 B" for Bukovina and "Operation 1111 M" for the rest of Moldavia.

In the end, a 1944 coup ended with Antonescu's overthrow by King Michael I and Romania changed sides and joined the Allies, giving up Northern Bukovina and Bessarabia to the Soviets "in exchange" for the recovery of Northern Transylvania from Hungary and marking the end of the Bukovina Governorate.

== See also ==
- Bessarabia Governorate (Romania)
- Transnistria Governorate
- Ținutul Suceava
- The Holocaust in Romania
