= Storojineț County =

Județul Storojineț
- County (Județ)
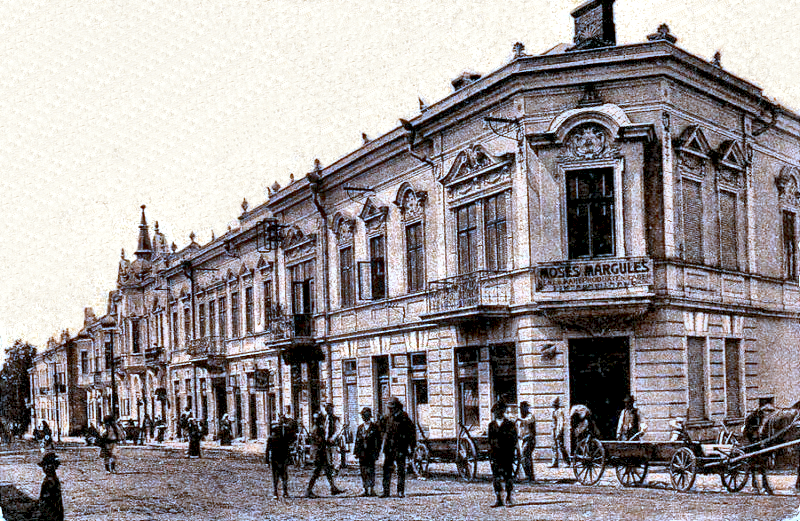
- Storojineț

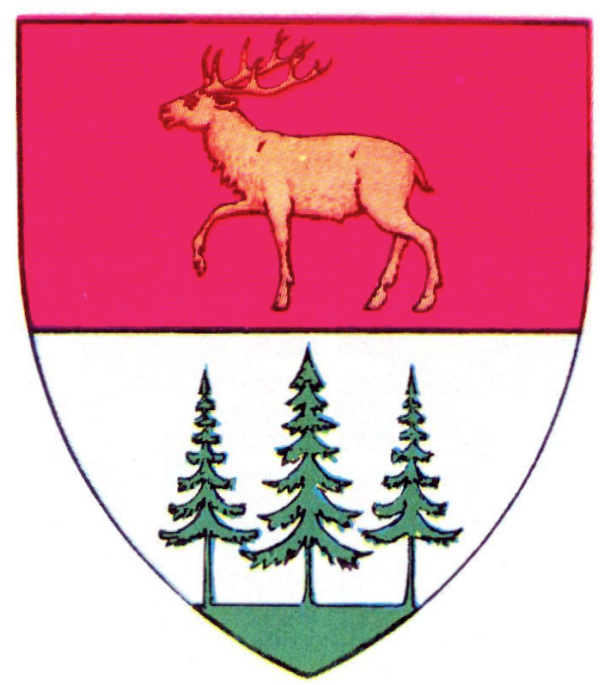
- Coat of arms

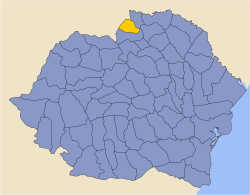
- Country: Rumania
- Historic region: Bukovina
- Capital city (Reședință de județ): Storojineț
- Established: 18 December 1918 (Decree No. 3715 for the administration of Bukovina; first time); 1941 (second time)
- Ceased to exist: 1940 (first time); 1944 (second time)

Government
  - Type: prefecture

Area
  - Total: 2,653 km^{2} (1,024 sq mi)

Population (1930)
  - Total: 169,894
  - Density: 64.04/km^{2} (165.9/sq mi)
- Time zone: UTC+2 (EET)
  - Summer (DST): UTC+3 (EEST)

Storojineț County was a county (județ) of Romania, in Bukovina, with the capital city at Storojineț. The area was incorporated into the Soviet Union in 1940 (after the Soviet occupation of Northern Bukovina) and again in 1944 (after the Soviet occupation of Romania), and has been part of Ukraine since 1991.

== History ==
Following the Union of Bukovina with Romania decided by the General Congress of Bukovina on 15/28 November 1918, the Storojineț County was created on 18 December 1918 by the Decree No. 3715 for the administration of Bukovina.

In 1925, according to the Law of Administrative Unification of 14 June 1925, the territory of the county was enlarged with the former Vășcăuți County and parts of Vijnița County.

In 1938, the county was abolished and incorporated into the newly formed Ținutul Suceava, together with the counties of Hotin, Suceava, Cernăuți, Dorohoi, Rădăuți, and Câmpulung.

In 1940, following the Molotov–Ribbentrop Pact and the Soviet ultimatum on 26 June 1940, Northern Bukovina (including all of Storojineț County) was occupied by the Soviet Union and incorporated into the USSR (Chernivtsi Oblast, Ukrainian SSR). Storojineț County was re-established (as part of the Bukovina Governorate) after Northern Bukovina was recovered by Romania in July 1941, following the invasion of the Soviet Union. Nevertheless, in August 1944 Northern Bukovina was taken over again by the Soviet Army and the borders as of 1 January 1941 were confirmed by the 1947 Paris Peace Treaties.

== Geography ==
Neighbours of the county were the Stanisławów Voivodeship of Poland to the west, the counties of Cernăuți to the north-east and Rădăuți to the south.

== Administration ==
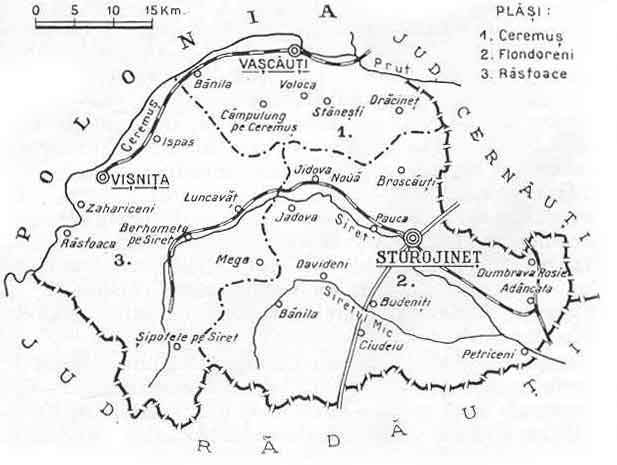
Map of Storojineț County as constituted in 1938.

The county consisted from 3 districts (plăși):

1. Plasa Ceremuș, headquartered at Vășcăuți (Vășcăuți-pe-Ceremuș)
2. Plasa Flondoreni, headquartered at Storojineț
3. Plasa Răstoace, headquartered at Vijnița

== Coat of arms ==
The Coat of Arms depicted three trees in the lower half and a deer in the upper half.

== Demographics ==
=== Population ===
According to the Romanian census of 1930 the population of Storojineț County was 169,894, of which 45.5% were ethnic Ukrainians, 33.9% ethnic Romanians, 9.0% ethnic Jews, 5.3% ethnic Germans, 4.7% ethnic Poles, as well as other minorities. Classified by religion: 78.1% were Orthodox Christian, 9.1% Jewish, 9.1% Roman Catholic, 1.9% Greek Catholic, as well as other minorities.

=== Urban population ===
In 1930, the urban population consisted of the following: Storojineț with 8,695 inhabitants, Vășcăuți with 6,336, and Vijnița with 3,799.

In 1930 the urban population of Storojineț County was 18,830, which included 31.9% Jews, 31.2% Ukrainians, 20.2% Romanians, 10.7% Poles, 4.2% Germans and 1.5% Russians by ethnicity, as well as other minorities. This population was classified by religion: Classified by religion: 46.2% were Orthodox Christian, 31.9% Jewish, 14.9% Roman Catholic, 6.3% Greek Catholic. 1.2% Lutheran, as well as other minorities.

== Gallery ==
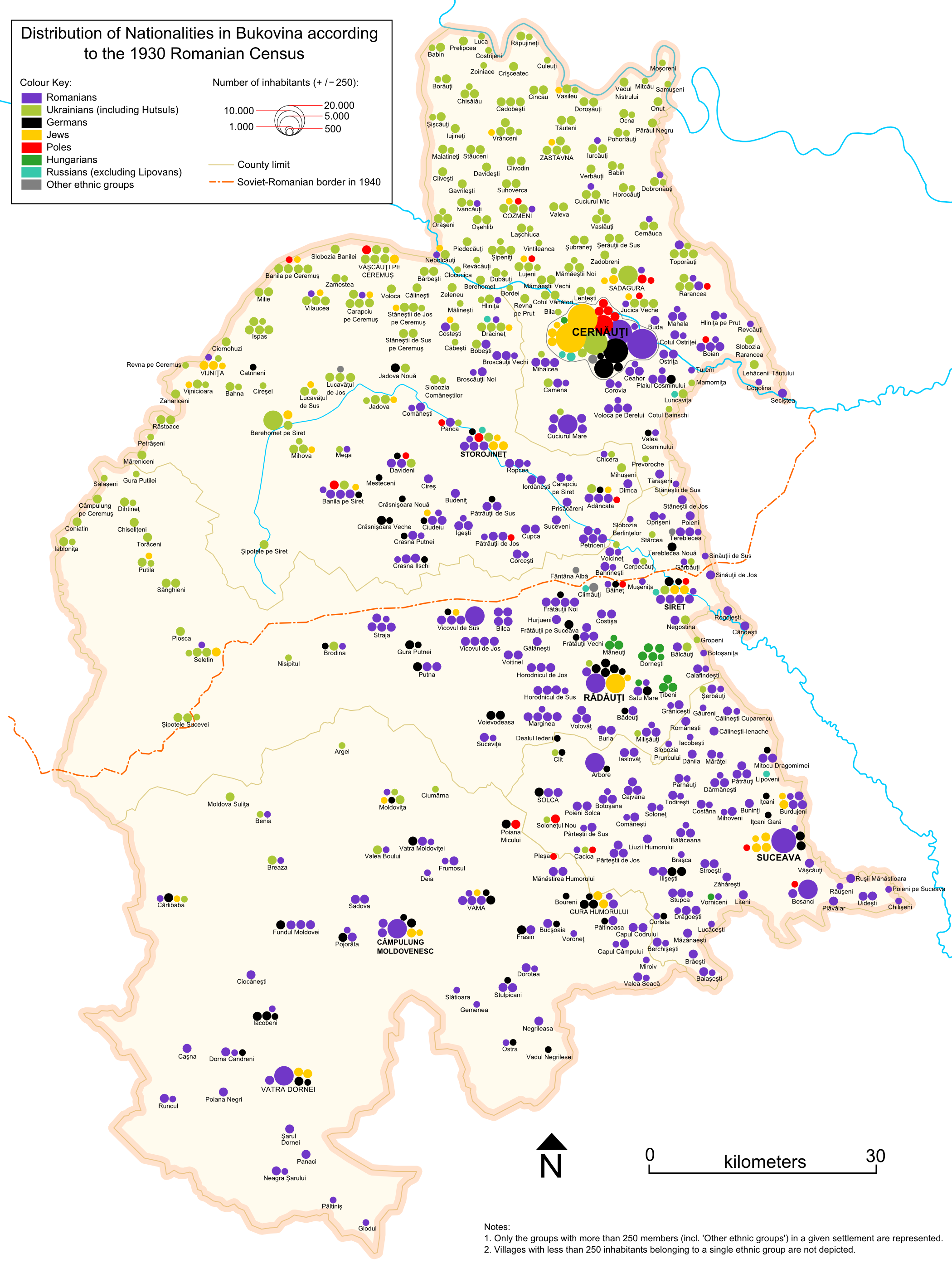
Demographic composition of Bukovina in 1930, with the 1940 border drawn in the centre

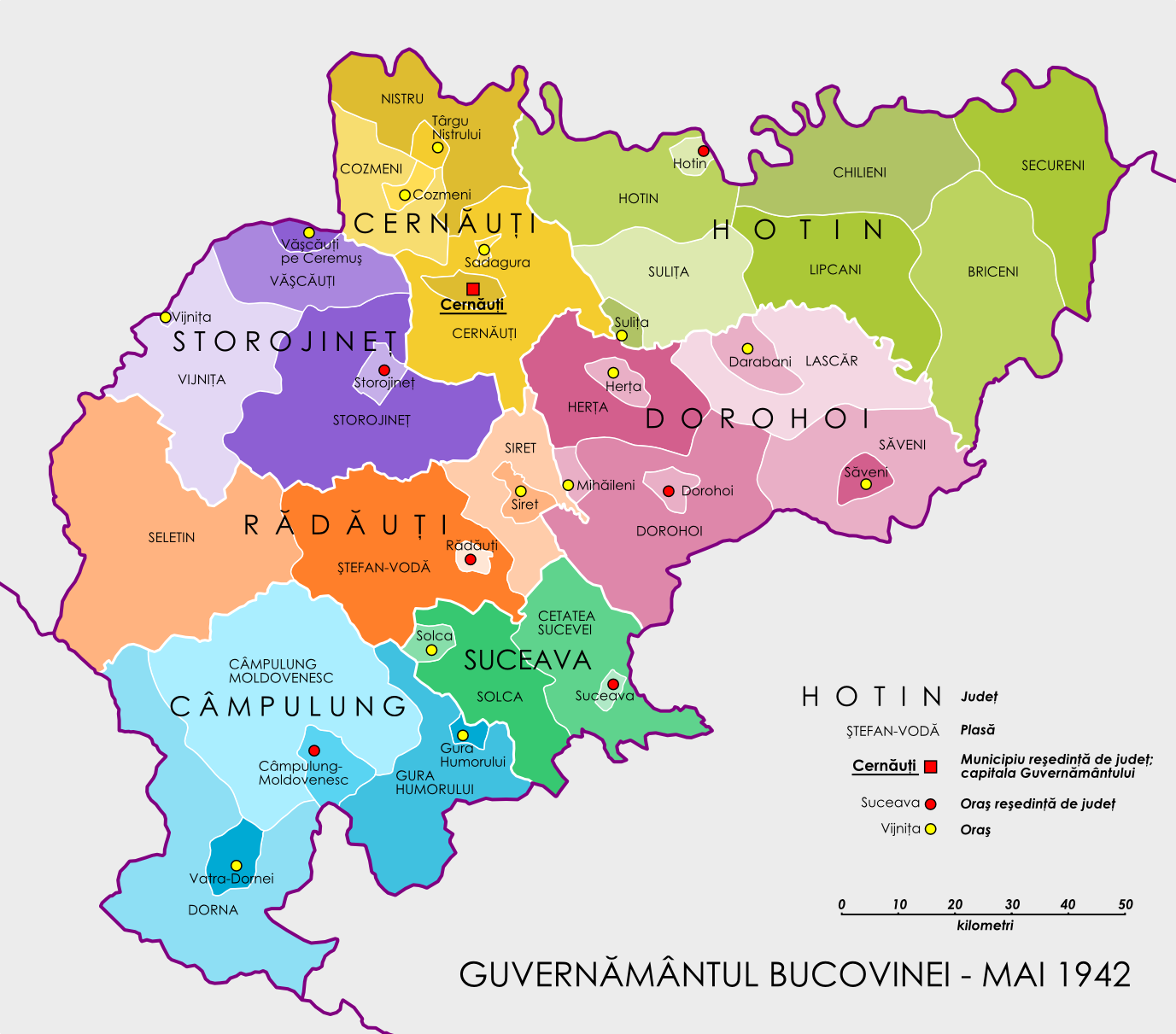
Governorate of Bukovina (1942)

== See also ==
- Bukovina
- History of Romania
- History of Ukraine
