= Baia County =

Județul Baia
- County (Județ)
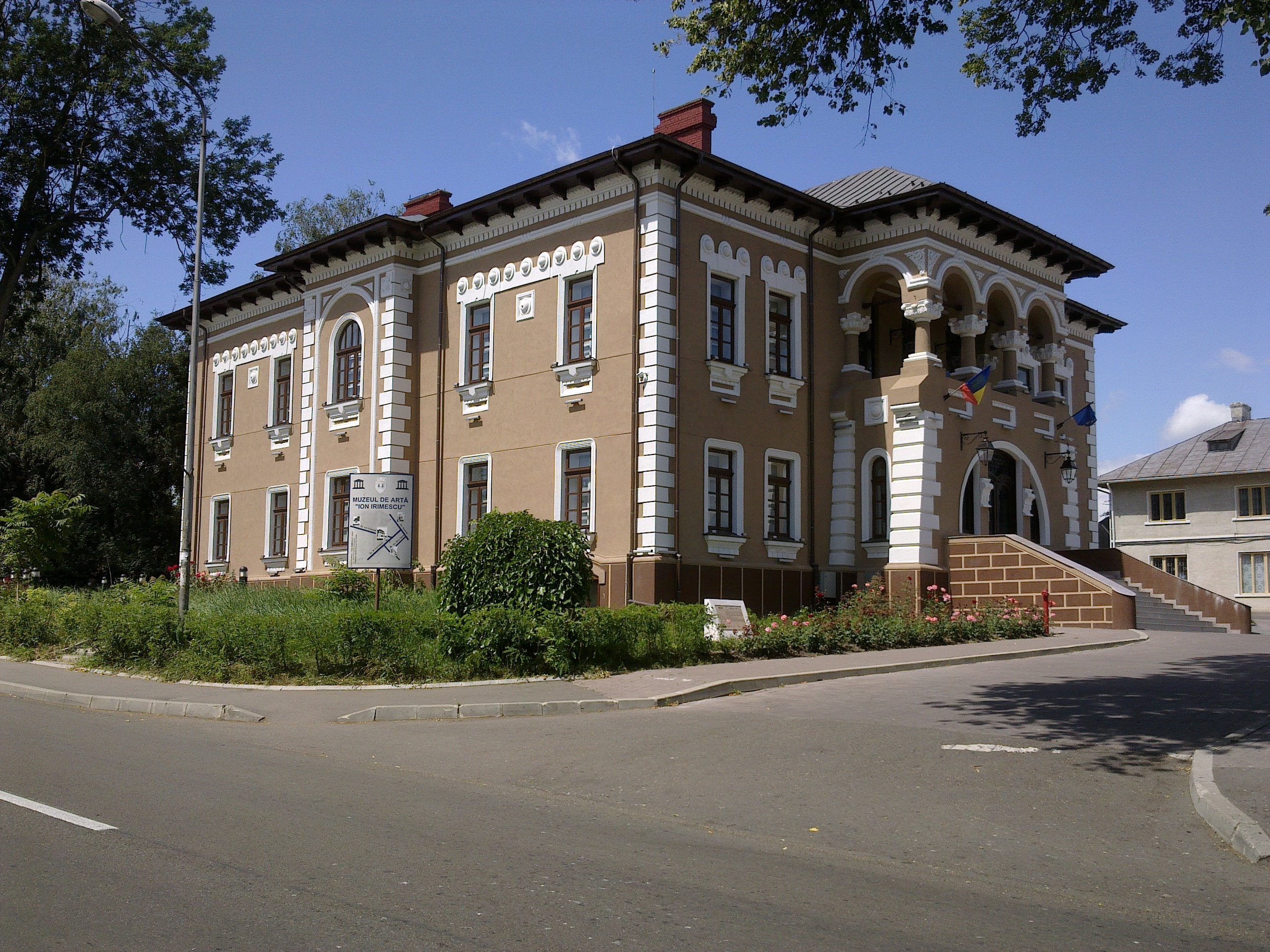
- The Baia County Prefecture building of the interwar period, now an art museum.

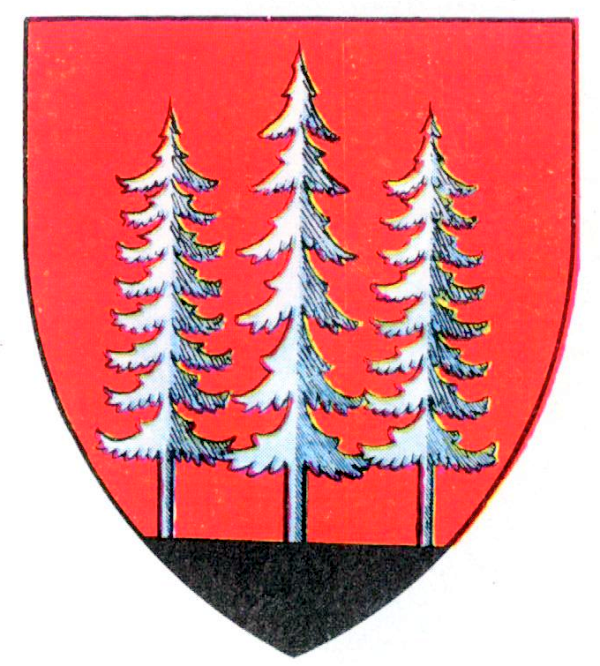
- Coat of arms

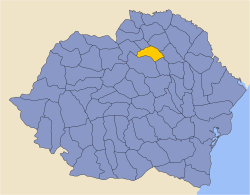
- Country: Romania
- Historic region: Moldavia
- Capital city (Reședință de județ): Fălticeni
- Established: 1925
- Ceased to exist: Administrative reform of 1950

Area
  - Total: 3,353 km^{2} (1,295 sq mi)

Population (1930)
  - Total: 157,501
  - Density: 46.97/km^{2} (121.7/sq mi)
- Time zone: UTC+2 (EET)
  - Summer (DST): UTC+3 (EEST)

Baia County is one of the historic counties of Moldavia, Romania. The county seat was Fălticeni.

In 1938, the county was disestablished and incorporated into the newly formed Ținutul Prut, but it was re-established in 1940 after the fall of Carol II's regime - only to be abolished 10 years later by the Communist regime.

== Geography ==
Baia County covered 3,353 km^{2} and was located in Moldavia. Currently, the territory that comprised Baia County is now included in the Suceava County, Iași County and Neamț County. In the interwar period, the county neighbored Câmpulung and Suceava counties to the north, Botoșani to the northeast, Iași to the east, Roman to the south, and Neamț counties to the west.

== Administrative organization ==
Administratively, Baia County was originally divided into three districts (plăși):

1. Plasa Moldova, headquartered at Baia
2. Plasa Pașcani, headquartered at Pașcani
3. Plasa Siret, headquartered at Lespezi

Subsequently, Plasa Moldova district was divided into two new districts:

4. Plasa Boroaia, headquartered at Boroaia
5. Plasa Mălini, headquartered at Mălini

=== Population ===
According to the 1930 census data, the county population was 157,501 inhabitants, consisting of 91.8% Romanians, 4.8% Jews, 1.2% Romanies, 0.6% Germans, as well as other minorities. As a mother tongue 93.5% spoke Romanian, 3.7% Yiddish, 0.7% Romany, 0.6% German, as well as other minorities. From a religious point of view, the population consisted of 92.9% Eastern Orthodox, 4.9% Jewish, 1.0% Roman Catholic, as well as other minorities.

==== Urban population ====
In 1930, the county's urban population was ethnically 76.6% Romanian, 19.7% Jewish, 1.3% German, as well as other minorities. From the religious point of view, the urban population had the following structure: 76.5% Eastern Orthodox, 20.3% Jewish, 2.4% Roman Catholic, as well as other minorities.

== Gallery ==
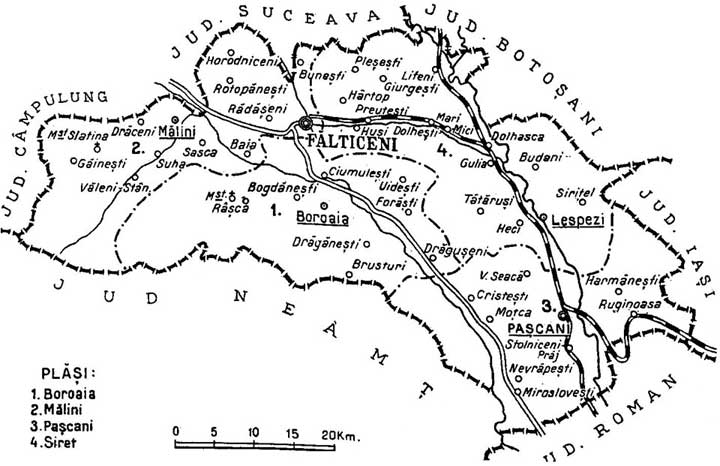
Map of Baia County (1938)
