= Târnava-Mare County =

Județul Târnava-Mare
- County (Județ)
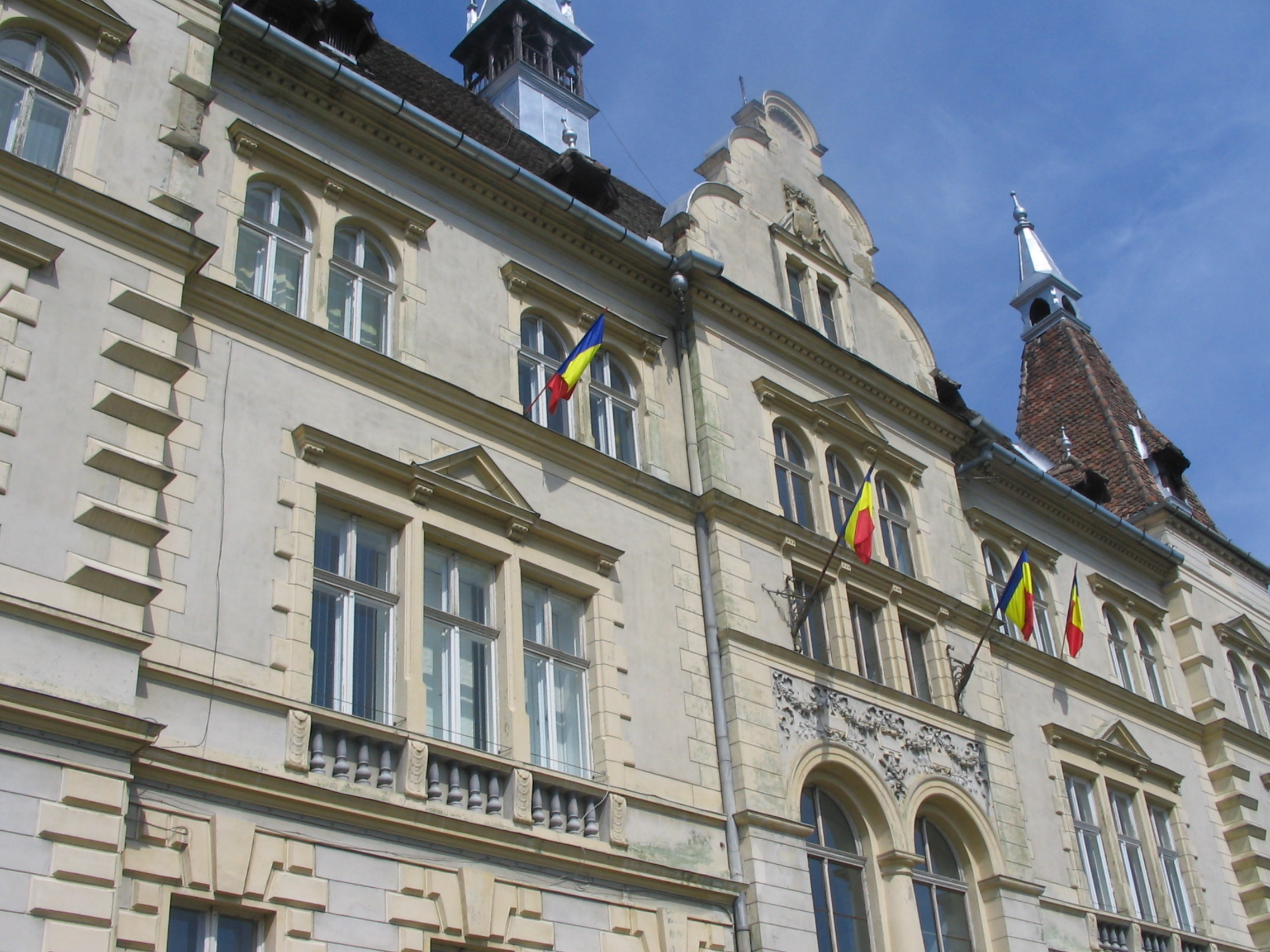
- Târnava-Mare County prefecture building during the interwar period, currently the Sighișoara city hall.

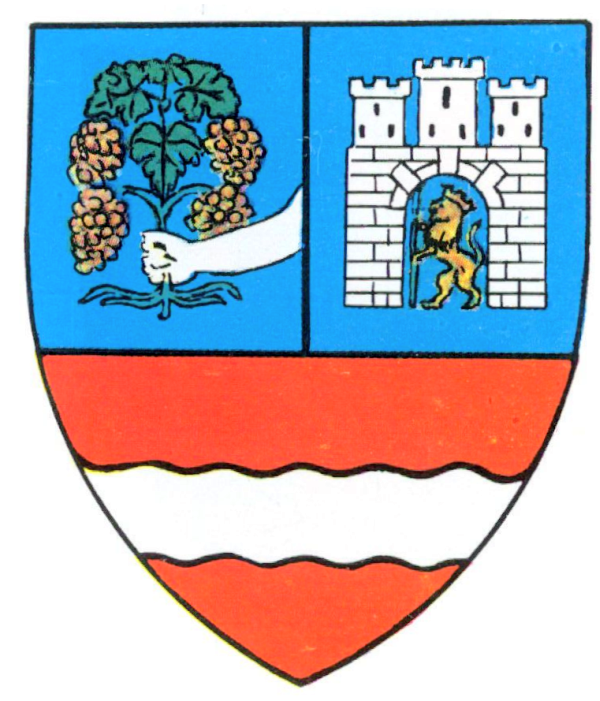
- Coat of arms

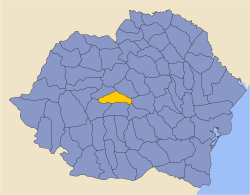
- Country: Romania
- Historic region: Transylvania
- Capital city (Reședință de județ): Sighișoara
- Established: 1925
- Ceased to exist: Administrative reform of 1950

Area
  - Total: 2,836 km^{2} (1,095 sq mi)

Population (1930)
  - Total: 147,994
  - Density: 52.18/km^{2} (135.2/sq mi)
- Time zone: UTC+2 (EET)
  - Summer (DST): UTC+3 (EEST)

Târnava-Mare County is one of the historical counties of the Kingdom of Romania, in the historical region of Transylvania. The county seat was Sighișoara. Yet the biggest city in 1930 was Mediaș

== Geography ==
The county covered 2836 km^{2} and was located in the central part of Greater Romania, in the south of Transylvania. Its territory currently belongs to the counties of Sibiu, Mureș and Brașov.

It was bordered to the north by the counties of Odorhei and Târnava-Mică, to the south by the counties of Sibiu and Făgăraș, and to the east by Brașov County. The county was disbanded with the administrative reform of 6 September 1950.

== History ==
Prior to World War I, the territory of the county belonged to Austria-Hungary and was identical with the Nagy-Küküllő County of Hungary. The territory of Târnava-Mare County was transferred to Romania from the Kingdom of Hungary as successor state to Austria-Hungary in 1920 under the Treaty of Trianon. After the administrative unification law in 1925, the name of the county remained as it was, but the territory was reorganized. In 1940, a portion of the county was transferred back to Hungary with the rest of Northern Transylvania under the Second Vienna Award. Beginning in 1944, Romanian forces with Soviet assistance recaptured the ceded territory and annexed it to the rump county. Romanian jurisdiction over the entire county per the Treaty of Trianon was reaffirmed in the Paris Peace Treaties, 1947. The county was finally disestablished by the communist government of Romania in 1950.

== Administrative organization ==
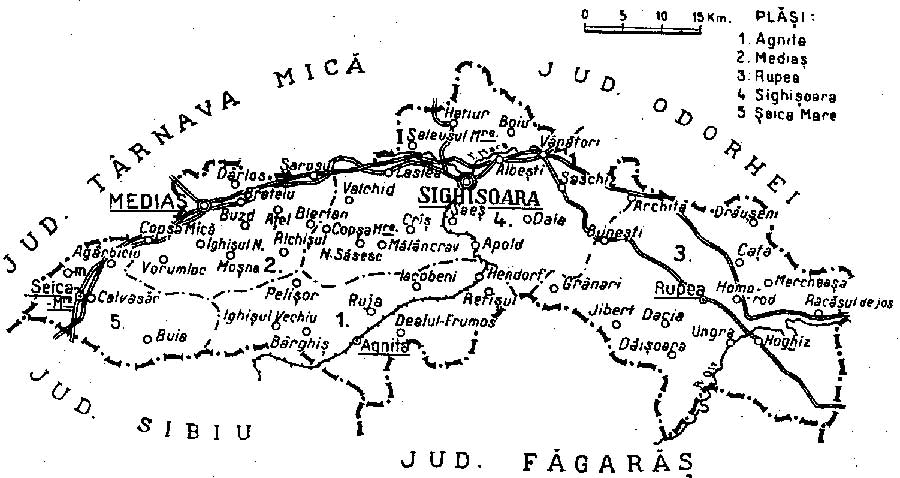
Map of Târnava-Mare County as constituted in 1938.

Administratively, Târnava-Mare County was divided originally into four districts (plăși):

1. Plasa Agnita, headquartered at Agnita
2. Plasa Mediaș, headquartered at Mediaș
3. Plasa Rupea, headquartered at Rupea
4. Plasa Sighișoara, headquartered at Sighișoara

Later, a fifth district was added:

5. Plasa Șeica Mare, headquartered at Șeica Mare

Târnava Mare County contained two urban municipalities (cities): Sighișoara (county capital) and Mediaș.

== Population ==
According to the 1930 census, the county counted 147,994 inhabitants, of which 44.8% were Romanians, 39.7% Germans, 11.8% Hungarians, 2.6% Romanies, and other smaller minorities. From a religious point of view, the population was divided as follows: Lutheran (39.2%), followed by Eastern Orthodox (36.6%), Greek Catholic (10.4%), Reformed (6.2%), Roman Catholic (4.5%), and other smaller minorities.

=== Urban population ===
The urban population consisted of Germans (39.3%), Romanians (30.0%), Hungarians (23.7%), and other smaller minorities. From the religious point of view, the urban population was made up of Lutheran (36.2%), Eastern Orthodox (23.2%), Roman Catholic (15.2%), Reformed (10.4%), Greek Catholic (7.8%), and other smaller denominations.
