= Plasă =

Former Romanian territorial division unit

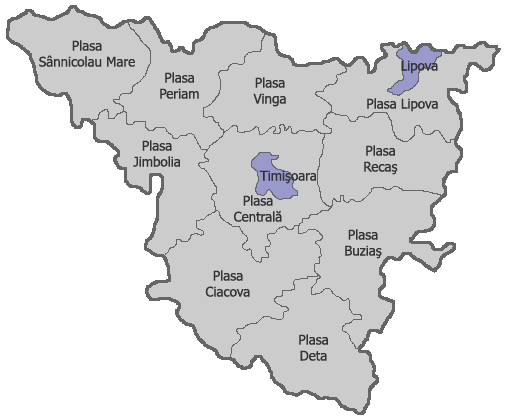
The plăși of Timiș-Torontal County in 1930

Plasă (Romanian pronunciation: [ˈplasə], plural plăși [ˈpləʃʲ]) was a territorial division unit of Romania, ranking below county (județ) and above commune. It was headed by a Pretor, appointed by the county Prefect. The institution headed by the Pretor was called Pretură.

The division of counties into plăși was used starting from the rule of Carol I as Domnitor, throughout the existence of a Romanian Kingdom, and during the first two years of the Romanian People's Republic, until they were replaced in 1950 by raions, following the Soviet system. In 1938, the country's 71 județe were divided into 429 plăși.
