= History of the Jews in Bessarabia =

The history of the Jews in Bessarabia (in hebrew בסרביה), a historical region in Eastern Europe, dates back hundreds of years.

== Early history ==
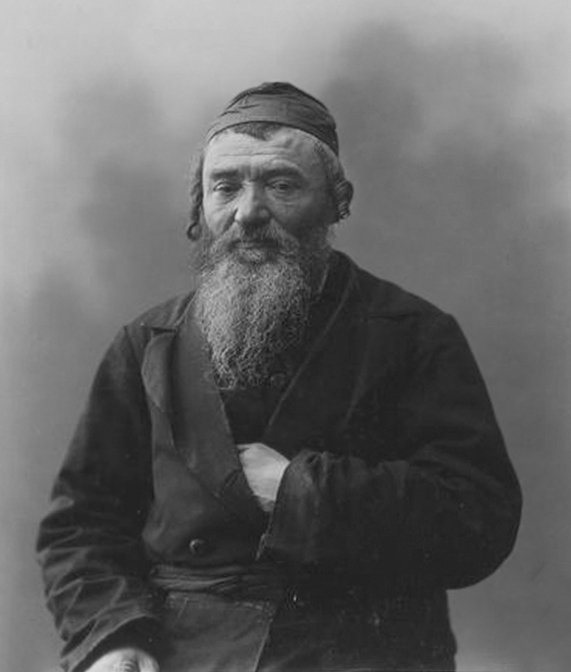
Jewish man in Chișinău (1900)

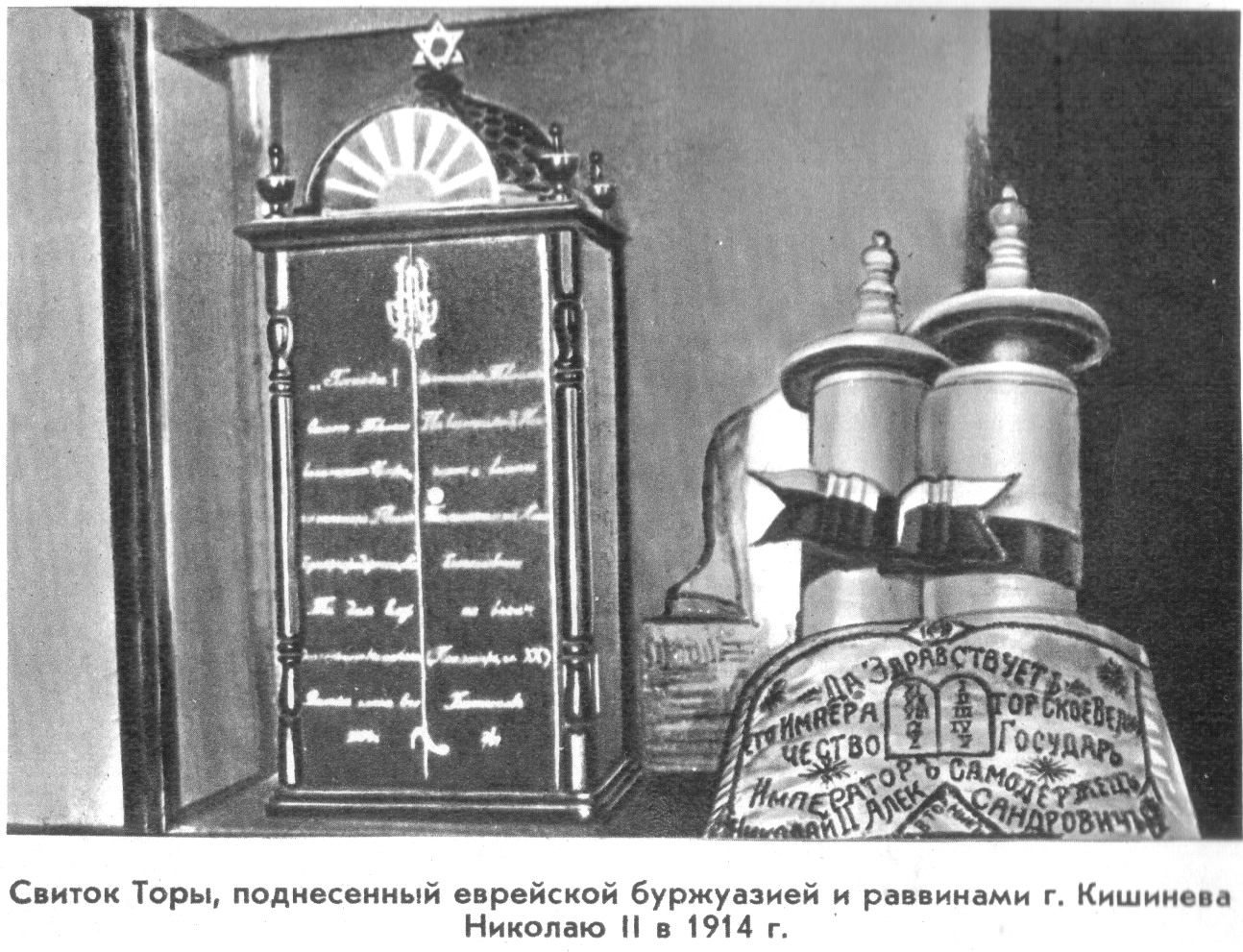
Torah scrolls presented by the Jewish community of Chișinău to Nicholas II, 1914

Jews are mentioned from very early on in the Principality of Moldavia, but they did not represent a significant number. Their main activity in the Principality of Moldavia was commerce, but they could not compete with Greek and Armenian merchants, who possessed extensive trade networks and experience in Levantine commerce.

On several occasions, when Jewish merchants established monopolies in parts of northern Moldavia, Moldavian rulers expelled some of them to Galicia and Podolia. One such example occurred during the reign of Petru Șchiopul (1583–1591), when commercial privileges were granted to the English merchants led by William Harborne.

In the 18th century, more Jews started to settle in Moldova. Some of them leased the Dniester crossings, replacing local Moldavian and Greek administrators, until the pârcălab (governor) of Soroca demanded their expulsion.

Others traded in distilled spirits (horilka), initially imported from the territories of present-day Ukraine, and later built local velnițe (pre-industrial distilleries) on boyar estates. The Jewish population increased significantly during the Russo-Turkish War (1806–1812), as wartime conditions facilitated movement across the Podolia–Moldavia border.

When the war ended in 1812, Bessarabia (the eastern part of the Principality of Moldavia between the Prut and Dniester rivers) was annexed by the Russian Empire. A cemetery was established in the early 19th century.

== Governorate of Bessarabia (1812–1917) ==
=== Status ===
The 1818 Statutory Law (Așezământul) of the Governorate of Bessarabia mentions Jews as a separate state (social class), which was further divided into merchants, tradesmen, and land-workers. Unlike the other states, Jews were not allowed to own agricultural land, with the exception of "empty lots only from the property of the state, for cultivation and for building factories". Jews were allowed to keep and control the sale of spirits on government and private manors, to hold "mills, velnițas, breweries, and similar holdings", but were explicitly disallowed to "rule over Christians". During the 1817 census, there were 3,826 Jewish families in Bessarabia (estimated at 19,000 people, or 4.2% of the total population).

=== Rural colonies ===
Over the next generations, the Jewish population of Bessarabia grew significantly. Unlike most of the rest of the Russian Empire, in Bessarabia, Jews were allowed to settle in fairs and cities. Tsar Nicholas I issued an ukaz (decree) that allowed Jews to settle in Bessarabia "in a higher number", giving settled Jews two years free of taxation. At the same time, Jews from Podolia and Kherson Governorates were given five years free of taxation if they crossed the Dniester and settle in Bessarabia.

As a result, the merchant activity was not enough to sustain all Jews, which led the Tsarist authorities to create 17 Jewish agricultural colonies:

The inauguration of the Tsar Alexander II Monument in Chișinău, with Stars of David displayed. Many local Jews attended the inauguration, as a display of the Bessarabian Jews' loyalty to the House of Romanov

==== In Soroca County ====
- Dumbrăveni (now part of Vădeni commune)
- Brăciova (Bricevo, now Briceva, part of Târnova commune in Dondușeni district)
- Mărculești (Starăuca/Starovka, for some period)
- Vârtojani (Vertiujeni, Șteap for some period)
- Lublin (later Nemirovka, now Nimereuca)
- Căprești
- Zgurița
- Maramonovca

==== In Orhei County ====
- Șibca (now Șipca)
- Nicolaevca-Blagodați (now Neculăieuca)
- Teleneștii Noi

==== In Chișinău County ====
- Grătiești and Hulboaca under joint administration (both now part of Grătești commune within Rîșcani sector of Chișinău)

==== In Bălți County ====
- Alexăndreni (now part of Alexăndreni Commune in Sîngerei District)
- Valea lui Vlad (now part of Dumbrăvița Commune in Sîngerei District)

==== In Hotin County ====
- Lomacința (now in Dniester Raion, Chernivtsi Oblast of Ukraine)

==== In Tighina County ====
- Romanăuți (Romanovca) (now within city limits of Basarabeasca)

10,589 Jews were settled in these villages, forming 1,082 households. This plan was borrowed from the ideas of Emperor Joseph II of Austria in regard to Bukovina Jews, but it became impractical as there Jews preferred to leave Bukovina than to settle in villages. The impression that Jews would not stay in the rural areas was proved wrong by the Russian Tzar, as his colonization at first seemed a success. However, after several years, Jews in these rural colonies preferred merchant activities with cattle, leather, wool, tobacco, while their agricultural land was mostly rented out to Christian peasants. After more years, many of these Jews moved to fairs and sold their land to Moldavians. During the 1856 census, there were 78,751 Jews in Bessarabia (about 8% of the total population of 990,000).

=== Late 19th and early 20th centuries ===
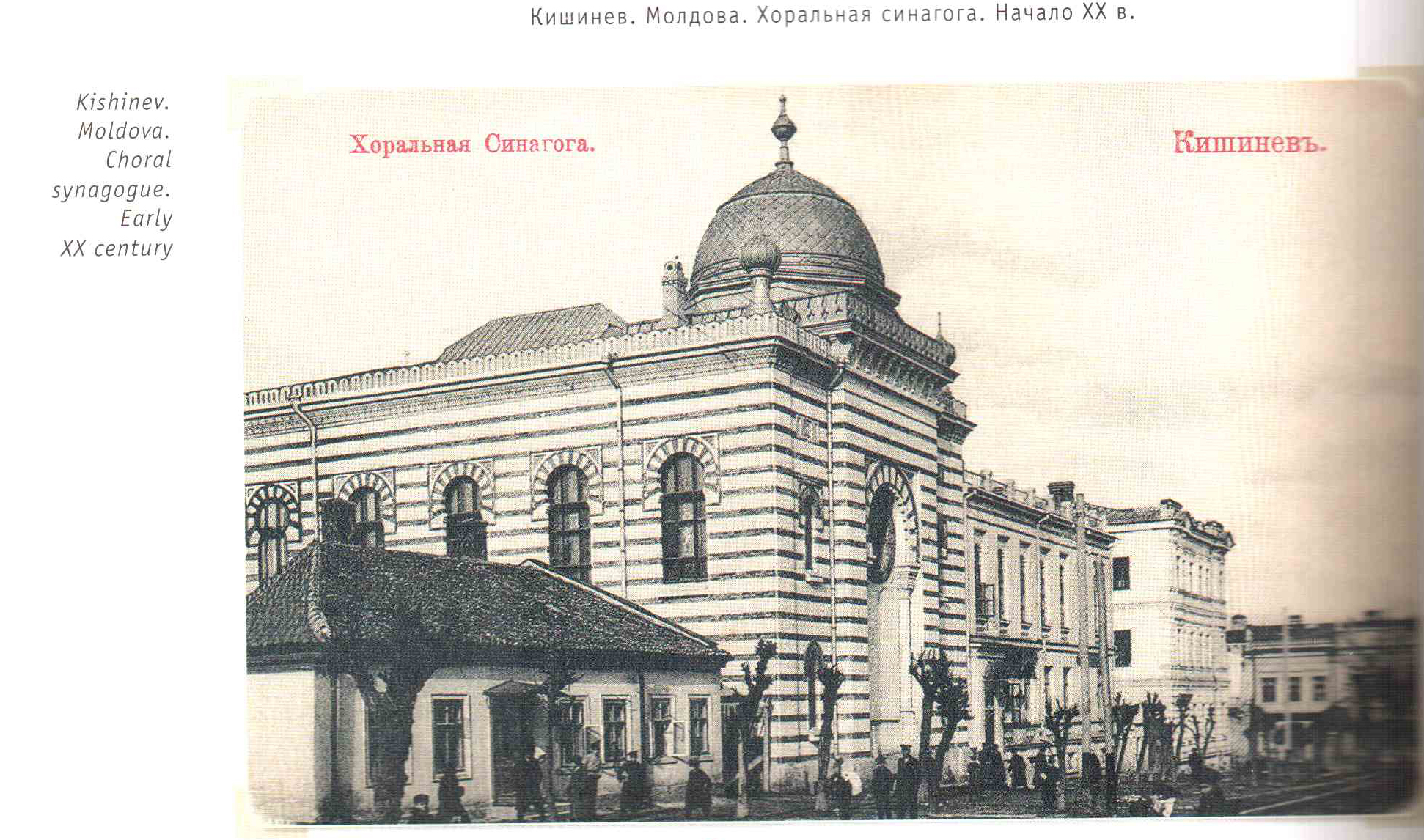
The Chișinău Choral Synagogue, 1913.

- 1889: There were 180,918 Jews of a total population of 1,628,867 in Bessarabia, or 11.11%
- 1897: The Jewish population had grown to 225,637 of a total of 1,936,392, or 11.65%
- 1903: Chișinău (then known as Kishinev), in Russian Bessarabia had a Jewish population of 50,000, or 46%, out of a total of approximately 110,000. Jewish life flourished with 16 Jewish schools and over 2,000 pupils in Chișinău alone.

=== Kishinev pogrom ===
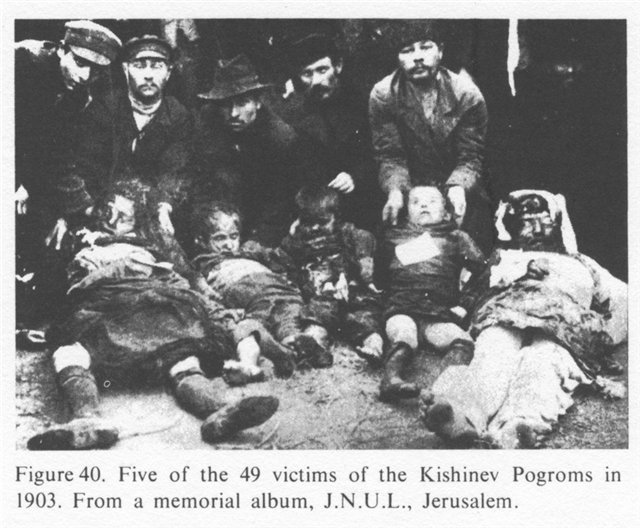
Victims of pogrom in Chișinău, 1903

There were two massacres in Kishinev (modern Chișinău) in 1903 and 1905 known as the Kishinev pogroms.

In 1903, a Christian Ukrainian boy, Mikhail Ribalenko, was found murdered in the town of Dubăsari, about 40 kilometres (25 mi) northeast of Chișinău; the town is on the left bank of the river Dniester and was not a part of Bessarabia. Although it was clear that the boy had been killed by a relative (who was later found), the government called it a ritual murder plot by the Jews. The mobs were incited by Pavel Krushevan, the editor of the Russian language anti-Semitic newspaper Bessarabian and the vice-governor Ustrugov. The newspaper regularly accused the Jewish community of numerous crimes, and on multiple occasions published headlines such as "Death to the Jews!" and "Crusade Against the Hated Race!" They used the age-old calumny against the Jews (that the boy had been killed to use his blood in preparation of matzo).

Viacheslav Plehve, the Minister of Interior, supposedly gave orders not to stop the rioters. However, the pogrom lasted for three days, without the intervention of the police. Forty seven (some say 49) Jews were killed, 92 severely wounded, 500 slightly wounded and over 700 houses destroyed. Despite a world outcry, only two men were sentenced to seven and five years and 22 were sentenced for one or two years. This pogrom is considered the first state-inspired action against Jews in the 20th century and was instrumental in convincing tens of thousands of Russian Jews to leave to the West and to Palestine. Many of the younger Jews, including Mendel Portugali, made an effort to defend the community.

== 1917–1940 ==
=== Moldavian Democratic Republic ===
In the Sfatul Țării, Bessarabian Jews were represented by:

- Isac Gherman, 60 years old, lawyer from Chișinău
- Eugen Kenigschatz, 58, lawyer, Chișinău
- Samuel Lichtmann, 60, civil servant
- Moise Slutski, 62, physician, Chișinău
- Gutman Landau, 40, civil servant
- Mendel Steinberg

The former four abstained from vote for the Union of Bessarabia with Romania on 9 April [O.S. 27 March] 1918, while the latter two were absent.

=== Greater Romania ===
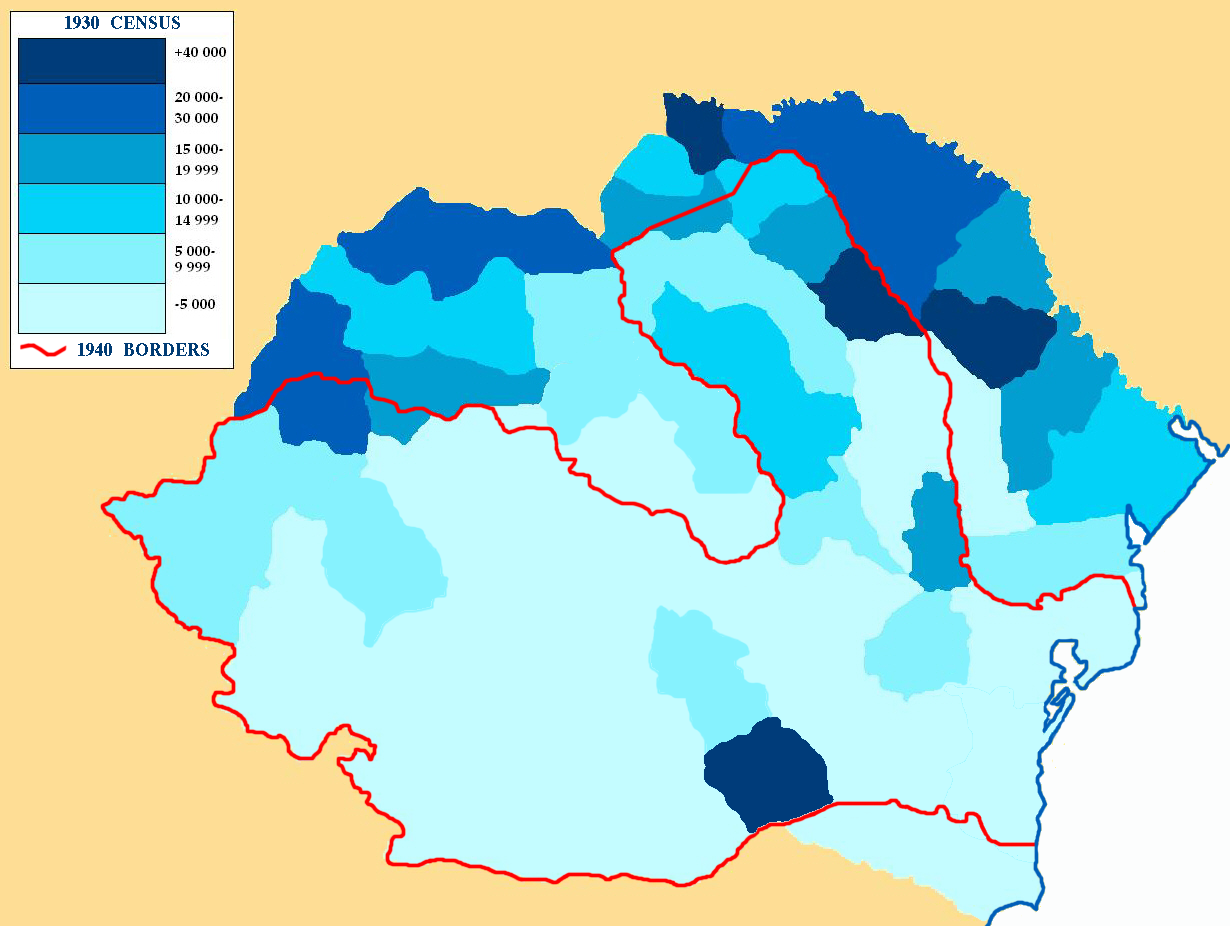
Jewish population per county in Greater Romania, according to the 1930 census

- 1920: The Jewish population had grown to approx. 267,000.
- 1930: Romanian census registers 270,000 Jews

== The Holocaust ==
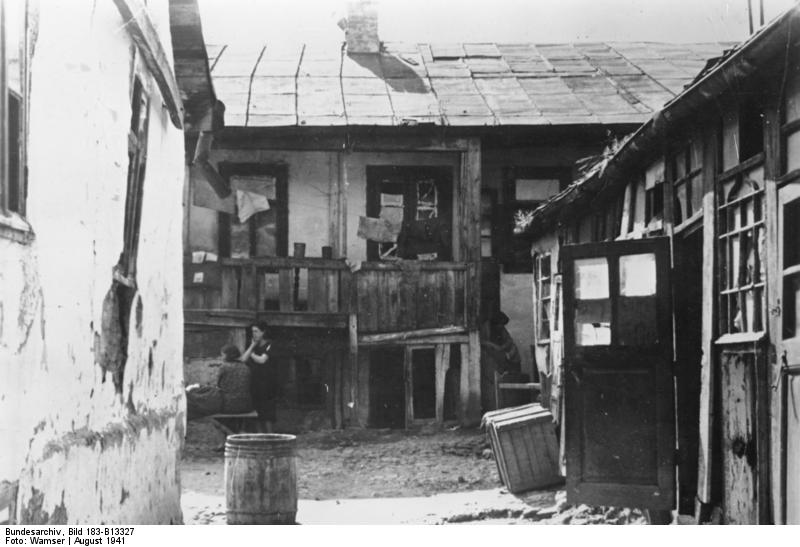
Chișinău Ghetto, August 1941

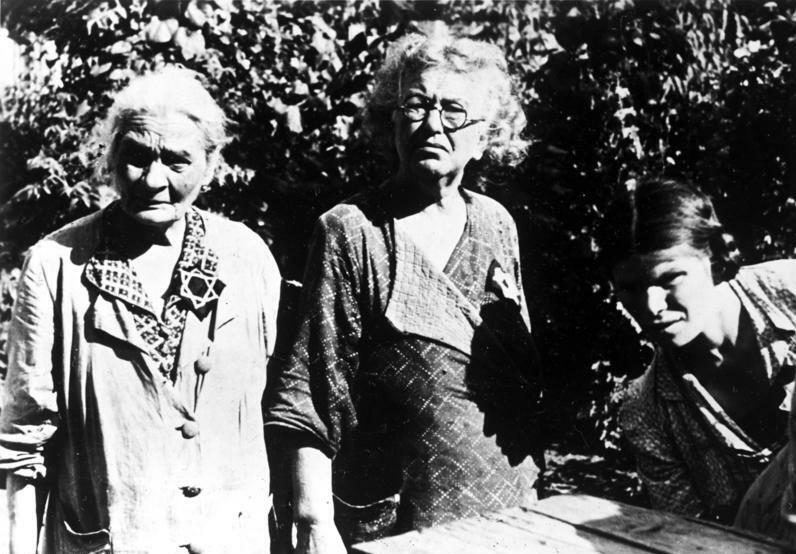
Chișinău Ghetto, August 1941

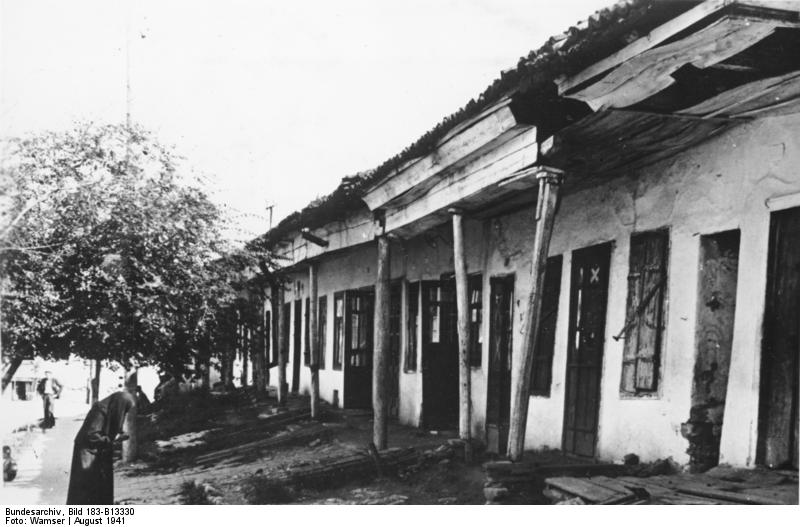
Chișinău Ghetto, August 1941

Many people was deported to Siberia from the region following the Soviet takeover, including a disproportionate number of Jews. According to the authoritative 1995 estimate of Dov Levin, the top expert in the history of the Jews in the territories occupied by the Soviet Union in 1939-1940, with which Jean Ancel concurred in 1998, the number of Bukovinian Jews who were deported to Soviet Asia in June 1941 was 5,000, together with 10,000 from Bessarabia; about half of those deported from Bessarabia survived and returned to Bessarabia according to a source mentioned by Jean Ancel (Matathias Carp), the specialist on the Holocaust in Romania and Transnistria, but this has not been confirmed by other sources. According to Dr. Avigdor Schachan, who wrote a book about the Transnistrian ghettos, and was himself brought up in the Bessarabian part of the present-day Chernivtsi Oblast of Ukraine, about 2,000 northern Bukovinian and 4,000 Bessarabian Jews were deported to the Soviet east. The total number of people considered for deportation from Soviet Moldova to Siberia in June 1941 was 31,699, while 8,374 had been designed from the Chernivtsi oblast of Ukraine and 3,767 from the Izmail oblast of Ukraine (southern Bessarabia); the total was 43,840. According to Nikolai Bougai, only 22,643 individuals had been deported from Soviet Moldova by September 1941. The number of inhabitants of the Chernivtsi Oblast who were deported to Siberia and Kazakhstan was 7,720 (2,279 families). According to some sources, most of the deportees of June 1941 from the Chernivtsi oblast, who were of many ethnicities, did not return from the Soviet east. However, the fragmentary, locality-by-locality, evidence indicates that most of the deportees from 1941 survived. In his 2011 book on the Holocaust in Romania, Ancel noted that "thousands" of Chernivtsi Jews were deported to Siberia.

In 1941, the Einsatzkommandos, German mobile killing units drawn from the Nazi SS and commanded by Otto Ohlendorf entered Bessarabia. They were instrumental in the massacre of many Jews in Bessarabia, who did not flee in face of the German advance. On 8 July 1941, Mihai Antonescu, deputy prime minister and Romania's ruler at the time, made a declaration in front of the Ministers' Council:

… With the risk of not being understood by some traditionalists which may be among you, I am in favour of the forced migration of the entire Jew element from Bessarabia and Bukovina, which must be thrown over the border. Also, I am in favor of the forced migration of the Ukrainian element, which does not belong here at this time. I don't care if we appear in history as barbarians. The Roman Empire has made a series of barbaric acts from a contemporary point of view and, still, was the greatest political settlement. There has never been a more suitable moment. If necessary, shoot with the machine gun. (This quote can be found in "The Stenograms of the Ministers' Council, Ion Antonescu's Government", vol. IV, July–September 1941 period, Bucharest, year 2000, page 57) (Stenogramele ședințelor Consiliului de Miniștri, Guvernarea Ion Antonescu, vol. IV, perioada iulie-septembrie 1941, București, anul 2000, pagina 57).

The killing squads of Einsatzgruppe D, with special non-military units attached to the German Wehrmacht and Romanian Armies were involved in many massacres in Bessarabia (over 10,000 in a single month of war, in June–July 1941), while deporting other thousands to Transnistria. The majority (up to 2/3) of Jews from Bessarabia (207,000 as of the last census of 1930) fled before the retreat of the Soviet troops. Perhaps as many as 100,000 to 130,000 Jews from Bessarabia and northern Bukovina left with the Soviets (including the deportees), including 124,000 according to Radu Ioanid. According to the Yad Vashem database, the number of Bessarabian Jews, excluding the deportees, who were registered during the evacuation in the interior of the Soviet Union was 49,435. However, 110,033 Jews from Bessarabia and Bukovina (the latter included at the time the counties of Cernăuți, Storojineț, Rădăuți, Suceava, Câmpulung, and Dorohoi: some other 100,000 Jews) — all except a small minority of the Jews that did not flee in 1941 — were deported to Transnistria, a region that was under Romanian military control during 1941–1944.

In ghettos organized in several towns, as well as in camps (there was a comparable number of Jews from Transnistria in those camps) many people died from starvation, bad sanitation, or by being shot by special Nazi units right before the arrival of Soviet troops in 1944. The Romanian military administration of Transnistria kept very poor records of the people in the ghettos and camps. The only exact number found in Romanian sources is that 59,292 who reached Transnistria died in the ghettos and camps from the moment those were open until September 1, 1943. This number includes all internees regardless of their origin, but does not include those that perished on the way to the camps, those that perished between mid-1943 and spring 1944, as well as the thousands who perished in the immediate aftermath of the Romanian army's taking control of Transnistria (see Odessa massacre).

In June–July 1941, about 10,000 (mostly civilians) were killed during the military action in the region in 1941 by German Einzatsgruppe D units and on some occasions by some Romanian troops. In Sculeni, several dozen local Jews were killed by the Romanian troops. In Bălți around 150 local civilians were shot by Einzatsgruppe (the young women were also raped), and 14 Jewish POWs by the Romanians. In Mărculești, 486 Soviet POWs of Jewish origin (many conscripted locals), who were left behind by the Soviet army because of wounds, to avoid being surrounded, were shot. Approximately 40 corpses of Jews were found dumped at the outskirts of Orhei, executed either by the German or Romanian units.

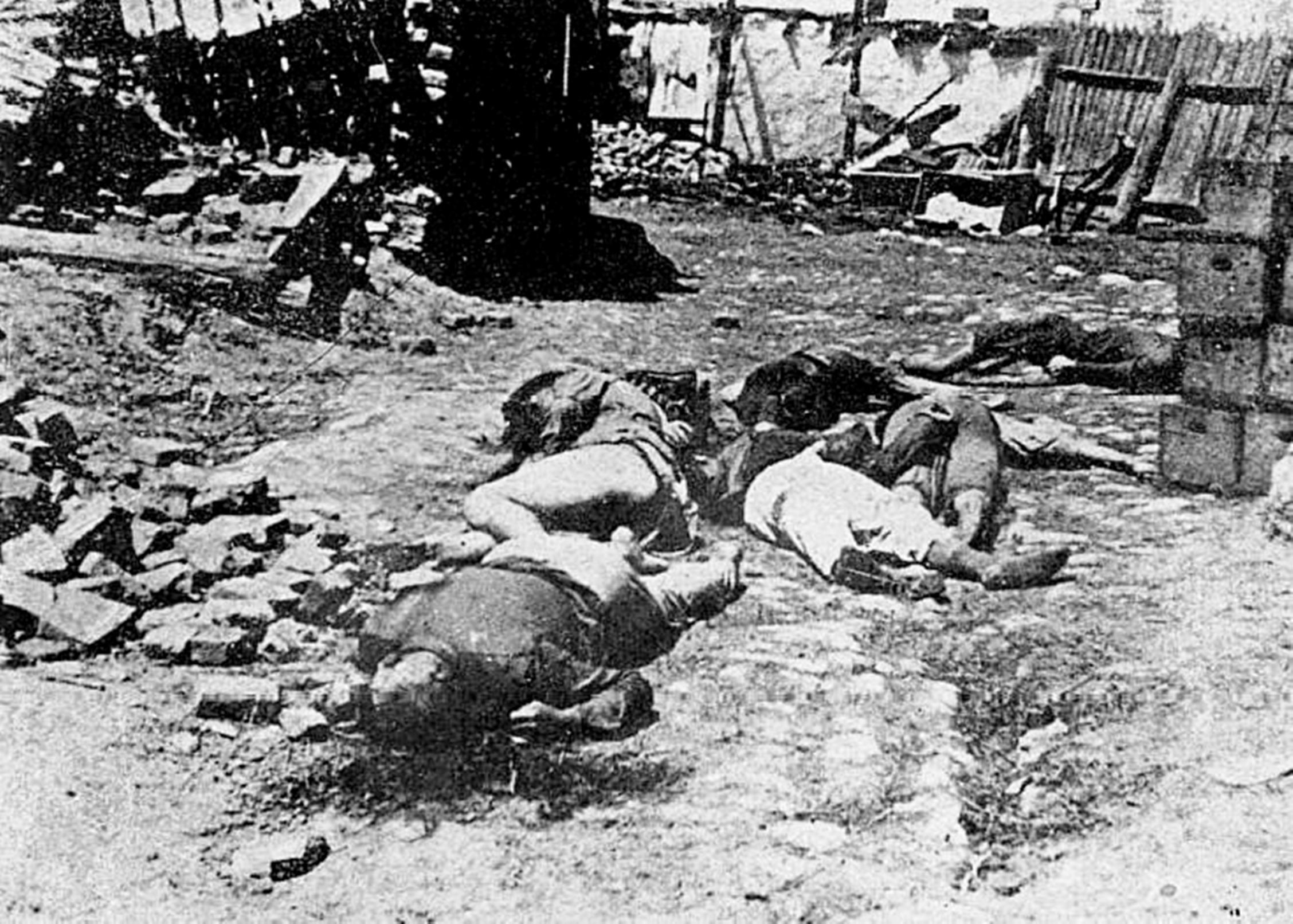
Aftermath of the Odessa Massacre: Jewish deportees killed outside Brizula

In a July 18, 1941, memorandum to Romania's military dictator Ion Antonescu, the National Peasants' Party leader Iuliu Maniu protested in two paragraphs against the massacres of Bessarabian and northern Bukovinian Jews as well as the Iasi pogrom. The Kishinev Ghetto was formed on 25 July 1941 by the Romanian authorities.

From 1941 to 1942, 120,000 Jews from Bessarabia, all of Bukovina, and the Dorohoi county in Romania proper, were deported by the Romanian authorities to ghettos and concentration camps in Transnistria, with only a small portion returning in 1944. The number of Jewish deportees to Transnistria sent there in 1941 who reached the latter province included 110,033 people, including 55,867 from Bessarabia, 43,798 from Bukovina, 10,368 from Dorohoi; out of these, 50,741 still survived by September 1, 1943. A further 4,000 Chernivtsi Jews were deported to Transnistria in June 1942. In November 1943, according to General Constantin Vasiliu, undersecretary of state for police and security in the Ministry of the Interior, if one includes the Jews deported from Dorohoi in 1942, but excluding the Hertsa area, 10,368 Jews were deported from the county, while if one includes the Jews of Hertsa, about 12,000 or more were deported. On May 20, 1942, 204 Jews from Chisinau were deported to Transnistria, while on July 10, 1942, other 27 Chisinau Jews were deported to Transnistria; the total number of Jews deported from Chisinau to Transnistria in 1942 was 231. In 1942, it was decided that 753 Bessarabian Jews (96 urban and 657 rural) would not be deported, while 26 Bessarabian Jews who were slated for deportation were not deported. According to Jean Ancel, hundreds, probably thousands, of Bessarabian and Transnistrian, and to a lesser extent Bukovinian Jewish children were handed over by their parents to non-Jews in order to guarantee their survival.

According to the Romanian gendarmerie, on September 1, 1943, 50,741 Jewish deportees survived in Transnistria, including 36,761 from Bukovina, including Dorohoi County (historically a part of the Old Kingdom of Romania, but administratively a part of Bukovina at that time), and 13,980 from Bessarabia. According to the statistics from the office of the Romanian prime minister of November 15, 1943, by province of origin from Romania and of county of residence in Transnistria, in the latter area there were 49,927 Jewish deportees who had survived, including 31,141 from Bukovina (without Dorohoi County, but including Hotin County), 11,683 from Bessarabia (without Hotin County), 6,425 from Dorohoi County, and 678 from the rest of Romania. The same document indicates that there were 706 Jews sent there from the rest of Romania (namely the Old Kingdom and southern Transylvania) in the camp at Grosulovo, which brings the total number of Jews deported from Romania still alive in Transnistria to 50,633. The deportation of the Chisinau Jews (and of Bessarabian Jews as a whole) to Transnistria, which was done by peasant carts and on foot (unlike in the case of the Jews of southern Bukovina, Chernivtsi, Storojinet and Dorohoi, which was done by train) partly explains why a large majority of the Bessarabian Jewish deportees died.

According to the foremost Israeli scholarly study on the Holocaust by Leni Yahil, almost 60,000 Jewish deportees survived in Transnistria. According to the Encyclopedia of the Holocaust, 55,000 to 60,000 of the Jewish deportees to Transnistria survived the Holocaust. Another estimate of the total number of Bessarabian Jews who survived the deportations to Transnistria was 20,000, which also indicates that a large majority of the deportees died in Transnistria. The ones who died did so in the most inhuman and horrible conditions. (In the same ghettos and camps there were many Jews from that region as well, responsibility for whose death lies on the Romanian authorities that occupied it in 1941–44.) According to Wolf Moskovich, Professor of Russian and Slavic Studies at the Hebrew University of Jerusalem, in the article "Bessarabia", in The YIVO Encyclopedia of Jews in Eastern Europe, "Only a third of the deported Jews survived Transnistria." According to Wolf Moskovich in the same article, "In all, some 100,000 Bessarabian Jews perished during World War II." According to the Yad Vashem database, 60,732 Jews whose names are listed who had lived in Bessarabia before the war were killed during World War II, while 133 died indirectly in relation to the Holocaust. The number of Jews listed by name who died or were killed in the Holocaust or Soviet repression who had lived in (historical) northern and southern Bukovina before the war in the Yad Vashem database as of 2025 was 50,749, whereas 7 died indirectly died because of the Holocaust, and 1,707 were "registered following the evacuation/ in the Interior of the Soviet Union". Iuliu Maniu condemned the deportations of Jews to Transnistria and he intervened to Ion Antonescu so that the latter would stop the deportations.

Shargorod was one of the few localities in Transnistria where most Bessarabian Jewish deportees survived the Holocaust. Many of the Jews in this ghetto died of disease, 1,449 from a typhus epidemic in early 1942, or were deported to labor camps, leaving only about 2,971 deported Jews (2,731 from Bukovina and 240 from Bessarabia) alive on September 1, 1943, though about 500 Jews originally from Dorohoi were relocated to the village of Capusterna (Kopystyryn) in 1943, as a part of the relocation of 1,000 Jews to ten nearby villages. Before the war, 2,145 of those who died during the Holocaust in Shargorod had lived in Romania before the war according to the Yad Vashem database. Out of them, 1,672 had lived in Bukovina before the war. Moreover, 76 had lived in Bessarabia before the war, while 301 had lived in Dorohoi and the adjacent localities. Most of the Bessarabian Jews who died in Shargorod whose names are known came from Hotin. At the other end of the spectrum were the 7,000 or more Jews from Bessarabia (southern Bessarabia and Chisinau) who were sent to, and executed in, the Bogdanovka concentration camp in December 1941. On March 14, 1944, Romania's military dictator Ion Antonescu allowed the repatriation of all the Jews deported to Transnistria. For information on the history of the Jews of Chisinau, the capital of Bessarabia and of the present-day Republic of Moldova, including during the Holocaust, see History of the Jews in Chișinău. For more information on the Holocaust in Transnistria, including on the fate of the Jewish deportees from Bessarabia, see History of the Jews in Transnistria.

The remainder of the 270,000 Jewish community of the region survived World War II, primarily consisting of Bessarabian Jews who fled in advance of the Soviet troop withdrawal in mid-July 1941. While they survived the period between 1941-1944, the conditions they endured during their relocation to the interior of the Soviet Union—such as to Uzbekistan in the summer of 1941—were harsh. The journey and subsequent living conditions upon their arrival were notably difficult. Around 15,000 Jews from Cernăuți and further 5,000 from elsewhere in Bukovina were saved by the then-mayor of the city Traian Popovici. Nevertheless, he was not able to save everyone, and some 43,798 Bukovinian Jews were deported to, and arrived in, Transnistria. At the end of the war, the remaining Jewish community of Bukovina decided to move to Israel.

As a result of the departure of the Romanian intellectuals in 1940 and 1944, of the Bukovinian Germans in 1940–41, of the surviving Bukovinian Jews in 1945, and of the forceful repatriation of Bukovinian Polish to Poland, Cernăuți, one of the cultural and university "jewels" of Austria-Hungary and Romania ceased to exist as such: its population (already 100,000 in 1930) being greatly reduced. After the war, some Bukovinian Ukrainians from the countryside, as well as a few Ukrainians from Podolia and Galicia moved to the city. However, they were generally excluded from the Soviet apparatus and higher positions in the economy and administration, which was formed mostly by people known to be loyal to the Soviet system sent from eastern Ukraine or from other parts of the USSR.

A Yizkor book about Jewish life in Bessarabia over multiple eras was published in 1959 in Tel Aviv, Israell in Hebrew in three volumes. The book is available for purchase and for free online.. It has been partially translated to English and is available online on JewishGen Another Yizkor book about Jewish life in Bessarabia specifically for the years 1914-1940 was published in 1973 in Tel Aviv, Israell in Hebrew in two volumes. The book is available for purchase and for free online. It has been partially translated to English and is available on JewishGen.

== Present day ==
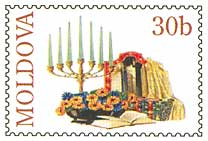

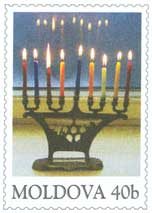
Stamp of Moldova

By the end of 1993, there were an estimated 15,000 Jews in the Republic of Moldova. In the same year 2,173 Jews emigrated to Israel. There were two Jewish periodical publications, both published in Chișinău. The one most widely circulated was наш голос Nash golos —אונדזער קול Undzer kol ("Our Voice"), in Yiddish and Russian.

== Demographics ==
Jews in Bessarabia
County	1817 census	1856 census	1897 census	1930 census	1941 census	1942	1959 census	1970 census	1979 census	1989 census	2002, 2004 census	
Hotin County	N/A	N/A	c. 54,000	35,985	N/A	N/A	N/A^{1}	N/A^{1}	N/A^{1}	N/A^{1}	N/A^{1}	Ukrainian part
Hotin County	N/A	N/A	c. 54,000	35,985	N/A	N/A	N/A^{2}	N/A^{2}	N/A^{2}	N/A^{2}	107^{2}	Moldovan part
Soroca County	N/A	N/A	c. 31,000	29,191	N/A	N/A	N/A^{3}	N/A^{3}	N/A^{3}	N/A^{3}	124^{3}	
Bălți County	N/A	N/A	c. 17,000	31,695	N/A	N/A	N/A^{4}	N/A^{4}	N/A^{4}	N/A^{4}	459^{4}	
Orhei County	N/A	N/A	c. 26,000	...	N/A	N/A	N/A^{5}	N/A^{5}	N/A^{5}	N/A^{5}	97^{5}	
Lăpușna County	N/A	N/A	c. 53,000	...	N/A	N/A	N/A^{6}	N/A^{6}	N/A^{6}	N/A^{6}	2,708^{6}	
Tighina County	N/A	N/A	c. 16,000	...	N/A	N/A	N/A^{7}	N/A^{7}	N/A^{7}	N/A^{7}	437^{7}	
Cahul County	N/A	N/A	c. 11,000	4,434	N/A	N/A	N/A^{8}	N/A^{8}	N/A^{8}	N/A^{8}	67^{8}	
Ismail County	N/A	N/A	c. 11,000	6,306	N/A	N/A	N/A^{9}	N/A^{9}	N/A^{9}	N/A^{9}	N/A^{9}	
Cetatea Albă County	N/A	N/A	c. 11,000	11,390	N/A	N/A	N/A^{9}	N/A^{9}	N/A^{9}	N/A^{9}	N/A^{9}	Ukrainian part
Cetatea Albă County	N/A	N/A	c. 11,000	11,390	N/A	N/A	N/A^{10}	N/A^{10}	N/A^{10}	N/A^{10}	1^{10}	Moldovan part
Total	19,130	78,751	225,637	...	...	...	...	...	...	...	...	

Notes:

^{1} 4 districts of Chernivtsi Oblast of Ukraine
^{2} Briceni and Edineț Districts of Moldova
^{3} Ocnița, Dondușeni, Drochia, Soroca, and Florești districts of Moldova
^{4} Rîșcani, Glodeni, Fălești, Sîngerei, and Ungheni districts, and municipality of Bălți in Moldova
^{5} Rezina, Șoldănești, Telenețti, Orhei, Dubăsari, and Criuleni Districts of Moldova
^{6} Călărași, Nisporeni, Strășeni, Ialoveni, Hîncești districts, and municipality of Chișinău in Moldova
^{7} Anenii Noi, Căușeni, Cimișlia and Basarabeasca districts, and municipality of Tighina (Bender) in Moldova
^{8} Leova, Cantemir, Cahul and Taraclia districts, and Gagauzia in Moldova
^{9} 9 districts and 2 cities of Odessa Oblast of Ukraine
^{10} Ștefan Vodă District of Moldova

Sources:

- Recensământul General al Populației României din 29 Decemvrie 1930. Vol. II: Neam, Limbă Maternă, Religie. București 1938.
- Moldovan Census (2004)

According to the 1930 Romanian Census, Jews were distributed in Bessarabia as follows:

- Hotin County: Hotin, 5,781, Briceni-Târg, 5,354, Edineți-Târg, 5,341, Lipcani-Târg 4,693, Secureni-Târg, 4,200, Sulița-Târg 4,152, Clișcăuți 452, Edineți-Sat, 398, other localities 5,614. Total: 35,985
- Soroca County: Soroca, 5,417, Zgurița, 2,541, Briceva, 2,431, Otaci-Târg 2,781, Mărculești-Colonie, 2,319, Vadu-Rașcu, 1,958, Vârtejeni-Colonie, 1,834, Căprești-Colonie, 1,815, Dumbrăveni, 1,198, Floreștii-Noi 372, Cotiujenii Mari 367, Dondoșani-Gară, 277, Liublin-Colonie 274, Târnova, 236, Ocnița-Gară, 200, other localities 5,171. Total: 29,191
- Bălți County: Bălți, 14,229, Fălești, 3,263, Rășcani-Târg 2,055, Ungheni-Târg, 1,368, Valea-lui-Vlad, 1,281, Sculeni-Târg, 1,204, Pârlița-Târg, 1,064, Alexandreni-Târg, 1,018, Cornești-Târg 338, Glodeni, 212, other localities 5,663. Total: 31,695
- Orhei County:
- Lăpușna County:
- Tighina County:
- Cahul County: Leova, 2,324, Cahul, 803, Baimaclia, 509, other localities 798. Total: 4,434
- Ismail County: Chilia-Nouă, 1,952, Ismail, 1,623, Bolgrad, 1,215, Reni, 1,170, other localities 346. Total: 6,306
- Cetatea Albă County: Cetatea Albă 4,239, Tarutino, 1,546, Tatar-Bunar, 1,194, Bairamcea, 805, Volintiri 420, Arciz, 342, Sărata, 316, other localities 2,528. Total: 11,390

According to the 2004 Census, there are 4,000 Jews in the Bessarabian part of Moldova (excluding Transnistria), including:

- 2,649 in Chișinău,
- 411 in Bălți,
- 385 in Tighina (Bender),
- 548 in other localities under Chișinău control, and
- 7 in suburbs of Tighina (Bender) under Tiraspol control.

There were also 867 Jews in Transnistria, including

- 573 in Tiraspol,
- 166 in Rîbnița, and
- 128 in other localities.

== See also ==
- Batushansky
- History of the Jews in Moldova
- History of the Jews in Chișinău
- History of the Jews in Bukovina
- History of the Jews in Transnistria
- Bogdanovka concentration camp
- Jewish Roots in Ukraine and Moldova
- Shargorod
- Mohyliv-Podilskyi
- Bershad
- Domanivka
- Jewish agricultural colonies in the Russian Empire
- Diana Dumitru, Moldovan researcher of the Holocaust in Bessarabia
