= Timofei Moșneaga =

Moldovan physician and politician (1932–2014)

Timofei Moșneaga OR PDU
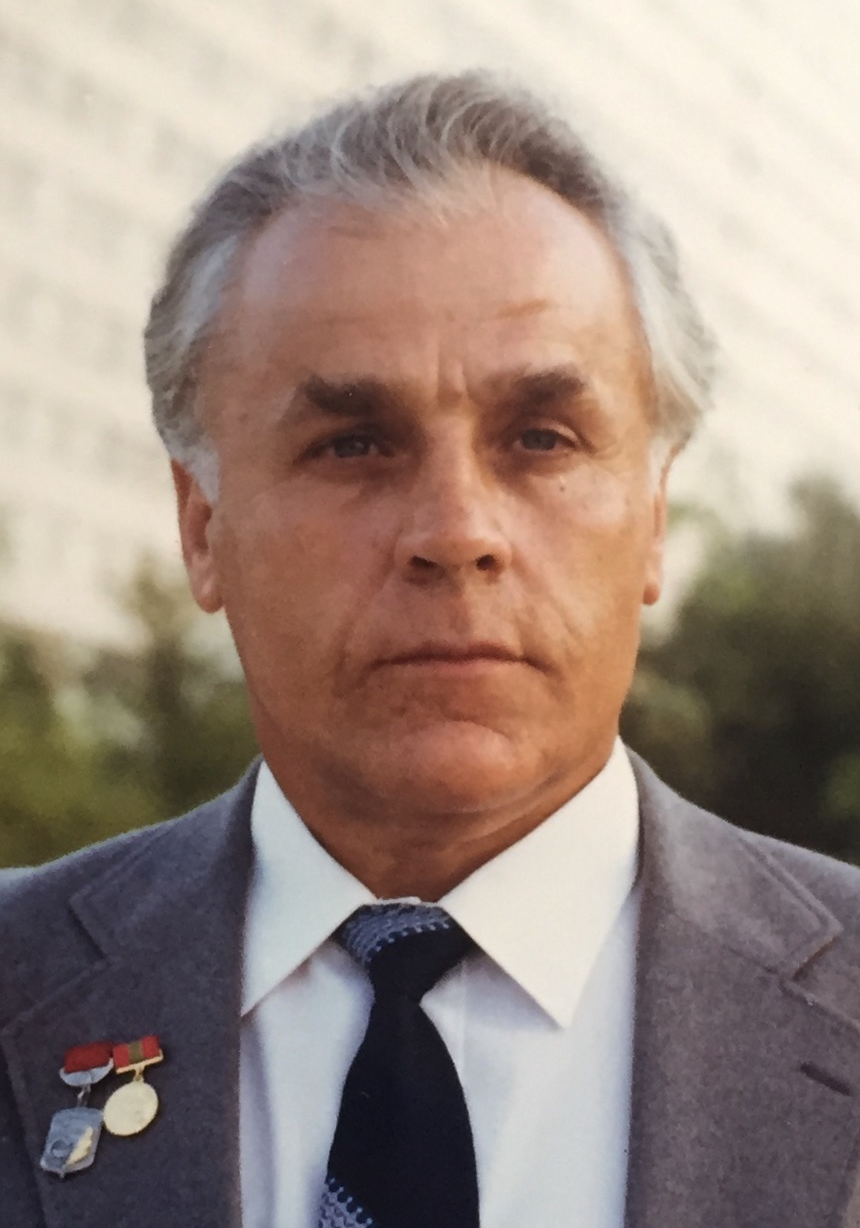
- Moșneaga, c. late 1980s

Director of the Republican Clinical Hospital
- In office 24 January 1997 – 26 December 2003
- Succeeded by: Mihai Ouș
- In office 27 February 1960 – 5 April 1994
- Preceded by: Iulian Kaspersky

Minister of Health
- In office 5 April 1994 – 24 January 1997
- President: Mircea Snegur; Petru Lucinschi
- Prime Minister: Andrei Sangheli
- Preceded by: Gheorghe Ghidirim
- Succeeded by: Mihai Magdei

Member of the Moldovan Parliament
- In office 27 February 1994 – 5 April 1994
- Succeeded by: Anatolie Popușoi
- Parliamentary group: Democratic Agrarian Party

Leader of the Moldovan group of observers in the Soviet of the Republics of the Soviet Union
- In office 18 October 1991 – 26 December 1991
- President: Mircea Snegur
- Prime Minister: Valeriu Muravschi

People's Deputy of the Soviet Union
- In office 25 May 1989 – 5 September 1991
- Constituency: Chișinău

Personal details
- Born: 6 March 1932 Corjova, Moldavian ASSR, Ukrainian SSR, Soviet Union (now Transnistria)
- Died: 1 June 2014 (aged 82) Chișinău, Moldova
- Resting place: Chișinău Central Cemetery
- Children: 2
- Education: Chișinău State Institute of Medicine
- Occupation: Physician; associate professor; politician
- Known for: Director of the Republican Clinical Hospital
- Awards: Order of the Republic; Order of Lenin; People's Doctor of the USSR; State Prize of the Moldavian SSR

Timofei Moșneaga (pronounced [timoˈfej moʃˈne̯aɡa]; 6 March 1932 – 1 June 2014) was a Moldovan and Soviet physician, healthcare administrator, and politician who served as Minister of Health of Moldova from 1994 to 1997. He was director of the Republican Clinical Hospital for over forty years (1960–2003). Since 2017, the hospital has been named in his honour.

== Early life ==
Timofei Moșneaga was born on 6 March 1932 in Corjova, Dubăsari District, to Vasile and Eufrosina Moșneaga. He was one of eight children, having four sisters and three brothers.

He attended primary school in his native village before continuing his secondary education in Dubăsari. Between 1947 and 1950 he attended the School of Medical Assistants in Bender and, after graduation, the Faculty of General Medicine at the Chișinău State Institute of Medicine. In 1959, after receiving his medical degree, Moșneaga was admitted to doctoral studies. He subsequently defended his doctoral thesis in medical sciences and was awarded the academic rank of associate professor.

== Career ==
In early 1960, at the age of 27, Moșneaga was appointed director of the Republican Clinical Hospital. He held the position for more than four decades. At the time of his appointment, the hospital operated from several adapted post-war buildings that no longer met the standards required for specialised medical care. One of his principal objectives was the construction of a new hospital complex. Following years of planning and development, the new hospital building was inaugurated in 1977.

Shortly afterwards, specialised departments for patients with medical and surgical conditions were established at the Republican Clinical Hospital and equipped with modern medical technology, including lithotripsy equipment for the treatment of kidney stones. New departments of gastric surgery, proctology, vascular surgery, paediatric cardiac surgery, and endoscopic surgery were also established. The Department of Medical Diagnosis was expanded with modern diagnostic equipment, including magnetic resonance imaging (MRI), as well as the Laboratory of Clinical Immunology, the Bacteriological Laboratory, and departments of peripheral vascular angiography and cardioangiography.

Moșneaga contributed to the development of teaching, research, and clinical training by creating suitable conditions for the 15 academic departments of the Chișinău State Institute of Medicine based at the Republican Clinical Hospital. He published approximately 150 scientific papers, including three monographs, and supervised the training of 16 Doctors of Medicine.

In 1980, Moldovan filmmaker Anatol Codru produced a biographical film about Moșneaga titled My Life's Dream (Russian: Мечта моей жизни). The film's score was composed by Arkady Luxemburg.

In 2002, to mark Moșneaga's 70th birthday, Moldovan publicist Ion Stici published a biography titled Timofei Moșneaga – The People's Doctor (Romanian: Medicul poporului Timofei Moșneaga).

For his contribution to the design and construction of the new Republican Clinical Hospital, Moșneaga was awarded the State Prize of the Moldavian SSR in Literature, Arts and Architecture in 1982.

During his career, Moșneaga received numerous honours and state awards, including the honorary titles Merited Doctor of the Moldavian SSR and People's Doctor of the USSR, as well as the Order of Lenin and the Order of the Republic. In 2003, he was awarded the title of Honorary Director of the Republican Clinical Hospital.

=== Political career ===
In 1957, Moșneaga was elected Member of the Chișinău City Council.

In 1989, he was elected People's Deputy of the Soviet Union and served on the Supreme Soviet Committee on Foreign Affairs. Together with Eugen Doga, he was one of only two members of the Moldavian delegation to sign an open letter to Soviet President Mikhail Gorbachev condemning the separatist movement that had emerged in Transnistria. Following Moldova's declaration of independence, he was appointed leader of the Moldovan group of special observers in the Soviet of the Republics of the Supreme Soviet of the USSR.

In 1994, Moșneaga was elected Member of the Parliament of Moldova, where he served on the Committee for Social Protection, Healthcare and Ecology.

From 1994 to 1997, Moșneaga served as Minister of Health of Moldova. During his tenure, he advocated the preservation of the country's medical heritage and reforms aimed at strengthening the healthcare system and improving the efficiency of medical institutions and personnel. He also worked with the Government of Japan to attract investment to Moldova's healthcare sector, resulting in the modernisation of hospitals across the country with medical equipment supplied by Siemens. In 1995, the Ministry of Health, under his leadership, drafted the National Healthcare Law, which continues to regulate Moldova's healthcare system. During his term in office, Moldova also established relations with the World Health Organization, which opened a regional office in Chișinău.

== Personal life ==
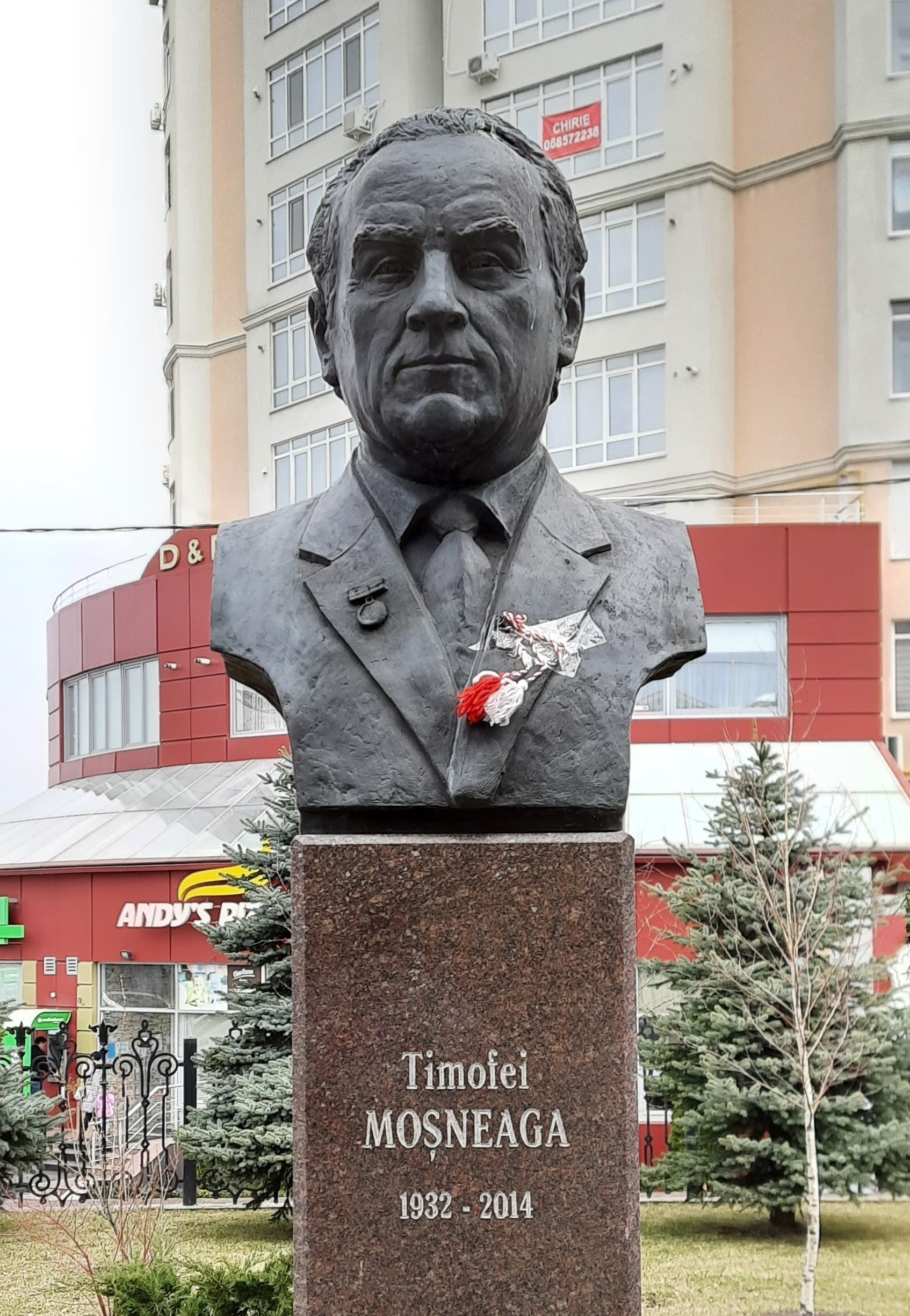
Bust on the Alley of Brilliant Scientists and Doctors in Chișinău

Timofei Moșneaga was married to Maria Moșneaga (née Burlacu; 1931–2016), an obstetrician-gynaecologist, Doctor of Medicine, and recipient of the Order of Work Glory. They had two sons.

== Legacy ==
Moșneaga died on 1 June 2014 in Chișinău.

His bust stands alongside those of 41 other distinguished physicians on the Alley of Brilliant Scientists and Doctors in Chișinău, near the Nicolae Testemițanu State University of Medicine and Pharmacy.

In accordance with the decision of the Cabinet of Moldova, the Republican Clinical Hospital was renamed after Timofei Moșneaga on 19 July 2017.

In October 2017, to mark the hospital's 200th anniversary, a bas-relief commemorating Moșneaga was installed at the hospital's main entrance.

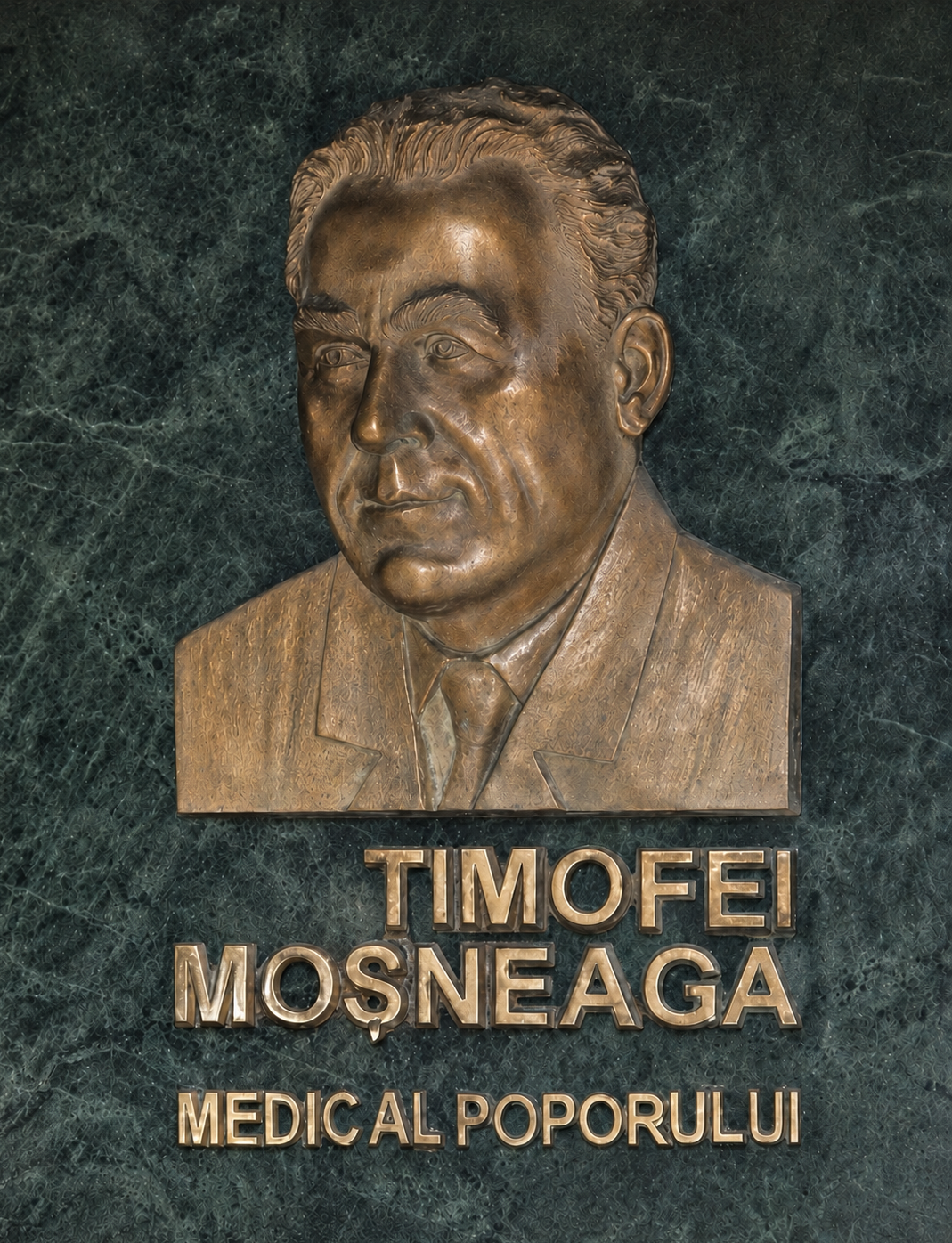
Bas-relief at the RCH's main entrance

== Honours and awards ==
| Year | Country | Honour |
|---|---|---|
| 1961 | (Soviet Union) | Medal "For Labour Valour" |
| 1966 | (Moldavian Soviet Socialist Republic) | Merited Doctor of the Moldavian SSR |
| 1970 | (Soviet Union) | Jubilee Medal "For Valiant Labour – In Commemoration of the 100th Anniversary of the Birth of Vladimir Ilyich Lenin" |
| 1971 | (Soviet Union) | Order of the Badge of Honour |
| 1976 | (Soviet Union) | Order of the Red Banner of Labour |
| 1979 | (Soviet Union) | People's Doctor of the USSR |
| 1982 | (Moldavian Soviet Socialist Republic) | State Prize of the Moldavian SSR |
| 1986 | (Soviet Union) | Order of Lenin |
| 1997 | (Moldova) | Order of the Republic |
| 2004 | (Moldova) | Nicolae Testemițanu Medal |

Political offices
| Preceded by Gheorghe Ghidirim | Minister of Health; 1994–1997 | Succeeded by Mihai Magdei |
