= Mihai Timofti =

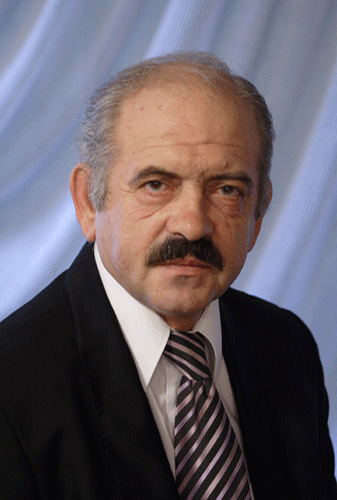
- Timofti in 2007

Background information
- Born: Mihail Timofti; 19 September 1948; Chișinău, Moldavian SSR, Soviet Union
- Died: 10 November 2023 (aged 75) Chișinău, Moldova
- Genres: Opera, operetta, musical, drama, film
- Occupations: Director, actor, musician, professor
- Instruments: Clarinet, piano, flute, piccolo, trumpet, saxophone
- Years active: 1965–2023
- Website: www.METimofti.com

Mihai Timofti (19 September 1948 – 10 November 2023) was a Moldovan theatre and film director, actor, multi-instrumentalist musician, professor, screenwriter, writer and composer. Held an honorary title of "Master of Arts". He was an outstanding representative of the culture of the Republic of Moldova.

== Biography ==
In 1965 he started his activity in the popular theatre "Contemporanul" (Art Director was the playwright Mr G.Timofte), where he appeared for the first time on the stage performing the leading part in the comedy of Mr G. Timofte "The Dreams and Troubles".

In 1967, he graduated from the E. Coca Musical School (now it is the Ch. Porumbescu Lyceum), the clarinet class and piano. At the Moscow Festival of the Popular Theatres in 1967 Mihai Timofti was awarded two gold medals for the leading part in the comedy "The Dreams and Troubles" and for the music written to this play.

In 1971, he graduated from the G. Musicescu State Conservatoire (the faculty of Director of Drama).

From 1971 to 1981, he worked at the Moldova Film Studio. He turned out about 40 documentary and short musical films.

In 1985, he took an external degree of the N. Rimsky – Korsakov Leningrad (St. Petersburg) State Conservatoire, the faculty of Director of Opera.

From 1993, Timofti was a citizen of Romania.

== Death ==
On October 26, 2023, Maestro M. Timofti was admitted to the State Chancellery Hospital in Chișinău, on Drumul Viilor Street 34, to the Urology Department for kidney failure.

On November 1, 2023 (18:35), in a deplorable condition — pre-coma — he was transferred to the Timofei Moșneaga Republican Clinical Hospital, where on November 3, 2023, he underwent surgery to unblock the kidneys. The operation was stopped due to diffuse hemorrhage. Maestro Timofti remained in a deep coma (coma stage 3).

On November 10, 2023, at 12:20, Mihai Timofti died at the Timofei Moșneaga Republican Clinical Hospital in Chișinău, at the age of 75.

Cause of death (official information based on the medical death certificate — M. Timofti):
I. a) Toxic-septic shock; b) Mixed sepsis: uronephrogenic, pulmonary; c) Left-sided pyonephrosis.
II. Bilateral kidney stones.

On November 13, 2023, the Maestro was buried at the “Sfântul Lazăr” Cemetery in Chișinău — Section: 282 | Row: 39 | Plot: 1a st.

== Awards ==
In 2007, M. Timofti was awarded the honorary title of "Master of Arts". On 25 March 2019, he was awarded the "Eugene Ureche" Award at the UNITEM 2019 Prize Gala, 18th Edition.

== Repertory ==
=== Director (performances) ===
(From 1971 to 1981: Mihai Timofti turned out about 40 documentary and short musical films.)

- The Drama performance "Macbeth" by W. Shakespeare
- The Musical "Birthday of Leopold the Cat" by B. Saveliev (First staged in the Soviet Union)
- The Musical "The Treasure of Captain Flint" by B. Saveliev
- The Opera "Manon Lescaut" by G. Puccini
- The Comic Opera "Dorothea" by T. Hrennikov
- The Operetta "The king of Waltz" by J. Strauss
- The Musical "Donna Lucia" by O. Feltsman
- The Operetta "Silva" by I.Kalman
- The Operetta "The Count of Luxembourg" by Lehar
- The Musical "An Ugly Duckling" children’s opera by I.Kovach
- The Operetta "The Story of the Lead Soldier" by D. Capoianu
- The Operetta "Mademoiselle Nitouche" by F. Hervé
- The Musical "Fantasy of Christmas" by Mihai Timofti
- The Operetta Evening – "The Ball – Surprise" by Mihai Timofti
- The children’s opera “Peter Pan” by L. Profetta
- The Opera "Lucia di Lammermoor" by Donizetti
- The Operetta "Rose – Mary" by Friml and Stothart
- The Opera "Otello" by G. Verdi
- The Opera "Carmen" by G. Bizet
- The Opera "Aida" by G. Verdi
- The Operetta "Die Fledermaus" by J. Strauss (English Version)
- Theatrical Concert “Dor de Eminescu” (English: Longing for Eminescu)
- The Operetta "The Merry Widow" by F. Lehár
- The Operetta "Die Fledermaus" by J. Strauss (Romanian Version)
- The Opera "The Troubadour" by G. Verdi

=== Actor ===
- The Musical "The Dreams and Troubles" by M. Timofti — Take
- The Drama performance "Serghei Lazo" by G. Timofte — holder of order
- The Drama performance "Victim" by G. Timofte — Romanian officer
- The Drama performance "A Noisy Love" by G. Timofte — Nicolae
- The Film "Lăutarii" by E. Loteanu — Vasile
- The Vaudeville "The Hussar`s Matchmaking" — Hussar
- The Drama performance "The Death of Theodore Ioanovich" — Boyar Kleshnin
- The Drama performance "The Dead Souls" by N. Gogol — Nozdryov
- The Drama performance "Macbeth" by W. Shakespeare — Macbeth
- The Musical "Birthday of Leopold the Cat" by B. Saveliev — Cat Leopold
- The Operetta "Die Fledermaus" by J. Strauss (English Version) — Frosch
- The Operetta "The Merry Widow" by F. Lehár — Njegus
- The Operetta "Die Fledermaus" by J. Strauss (Romanian Version) — Frosch

=== Scenarist ===
- The Musical "Fantasy of Christmas"
- The Operetta Evening – "The Ball – Surprise"
- Theatrical Concert “Dor de Eminescu” (English: Longing for Eminescu)

=== Composer ===
- The Musical "The Dreams and Troubles"

== Selected performances ==
=== Orenburg Theatre of Musical Comedy (Director, 1984–1985) ===
- "Birthday of Leopold the Cat" by B. Saveliev
- "Rose – Mary" by Friml and Stothart.

=== Saransk Musical Theatre (Head Director, 1986–1988) ===
- "The king of Waltz" by J. Strauss
- The Comic Opera "Dorothea" by T. Hrennikov
- "Donna Lucia" by O. Feltsman

=== Tomsk Musical Theatre (Director, 1989–1990) ===
- "The Treasure of Captain Flint" by B. Saveliev
- "Dorothea" by T. Hrennikov

=== National Theatre of Opera and Ballet "Maria Bieşu" (Director and actor, 1990–2014) ===
- 1990 – "An Ugly Duckling” children’s opera by I. Kovach
- 1991 – The Operetta Evening – “ The Ball – Surprise ” (the scenario written by Mihai Timofti)
  - The Operetta "The Story of the Lead Soldier" by D. Capoianu (National Opera and Ballet "Oleg Danovski", Constanta, Romania)
- 1992 – The Operetta “Mademoiselle Nitouche” by F. Hervé (The Musical Theatre, Galats, Romania)
- 1993 – The Opera “Lucia di Lammermoor” by Donizetti, The children’s opera “Peter Pan”
- 1996 – The Musical “ Fantasy of Christmas ” (the scenario written by Mihai Timofti)
- 1997 – The Opera “Carmen” by G. Bizet
- 2005 – The Opera “Aida” by G. Verdi
- 2006 – The Operetta “Die Fledermaus” by J. Strauss (English Version) (Director and the role of Frosch: Mihai Timofti)
- 2012 – Theatrical Concert “Dor de Eminescu” (English: Longing for Eminescu) (the scenario written by Mihai Timofti)
  - The Operetta “The Merry Widow” by F. Lehár (Director and the role of Njegus: Mihai Timofti)
- 2013 – The Operetta “Die Fledermaus” by J. Strauss (Romanian Version) (Director and the role of Frosch: Mihai Timofti)
  - Opera "Il trovatore" by G. Verdi
- 2014 – "An Ugly Duckling” children’s opera by I. Kovach

== In Memory ==
- On June 18, 2024, in memory of Mihai Timofti, over 60 stickers were created for popular messaging apps Telegram and Viber (three packs), reflecting his creative legacy and cultural significance.
- In October 2024, two works (portraits as works of art) titled "In Memory of Maestro M. Timofti" were created by the artist Yuri Brașoveanu. The portraits also feature two quotes by M. Timofti, commemorating his artistic contributions.
- On November 7, 2024, Post of Moldova issued a prepaid postcard dedicated to Mihai Timofti’s memory. The postcard was issued by the central branch of Moldovan Post (MD-2012) with a print run of 200 copies, and its cost was 12 MDL. The postcard was also made available for sale in the philatelic shop.
- On November 10, 2024, a Romanian-language song was released in honor of Mihai Timofti (Timofte). This composition serves as a musical tribute to the esteemed maestro, celebrating his significant contributions to culture and the arts.
- On November 14, 2024, another song was released, a Russian-language version. It features the original Romanian lyrics translated into Russian, with a distinct melody and a more energetic tempo. This musical interpretation symbolizes Mihai Timofti’s vibrant character — a person full of energy and humor.
- On November 20, 2024, a personalized postage stamp was issued in memory of Maestro Mihail Timofti. Post of Moldova.
- On November 10, 2025, in memory of Maestro Mihai Timofti, a new collection of over 50 cartoon-style stickers was released, available in the popular messaging apps Telegram and Viber (3 packs). The series is designed to convey the Maestro’s character and image through light, stylized graphics. The collections serve as a digital way to preserve his memory and continue spreading his creative legacy.
