= People's Teacher =

People's (National) Teacher is an honorary title and may refer to:

- People's Teacher of the USSR
- People's Teacher of the Russian Federation
- People's Teacher of Tatarstan
- People's Teacher of Ukraine
- People's Teacher of Uzbekistan
- People's Teacher of Albania
- People's Teacher of Mongolia
