= Anointing brush =

Liturgical tool to administer sacred oils

An anointing brush is a liturgical brush used in the Byzantine Rite to administer one of the sacred oils: chrism, oil of catechumens, or oil of the sick.

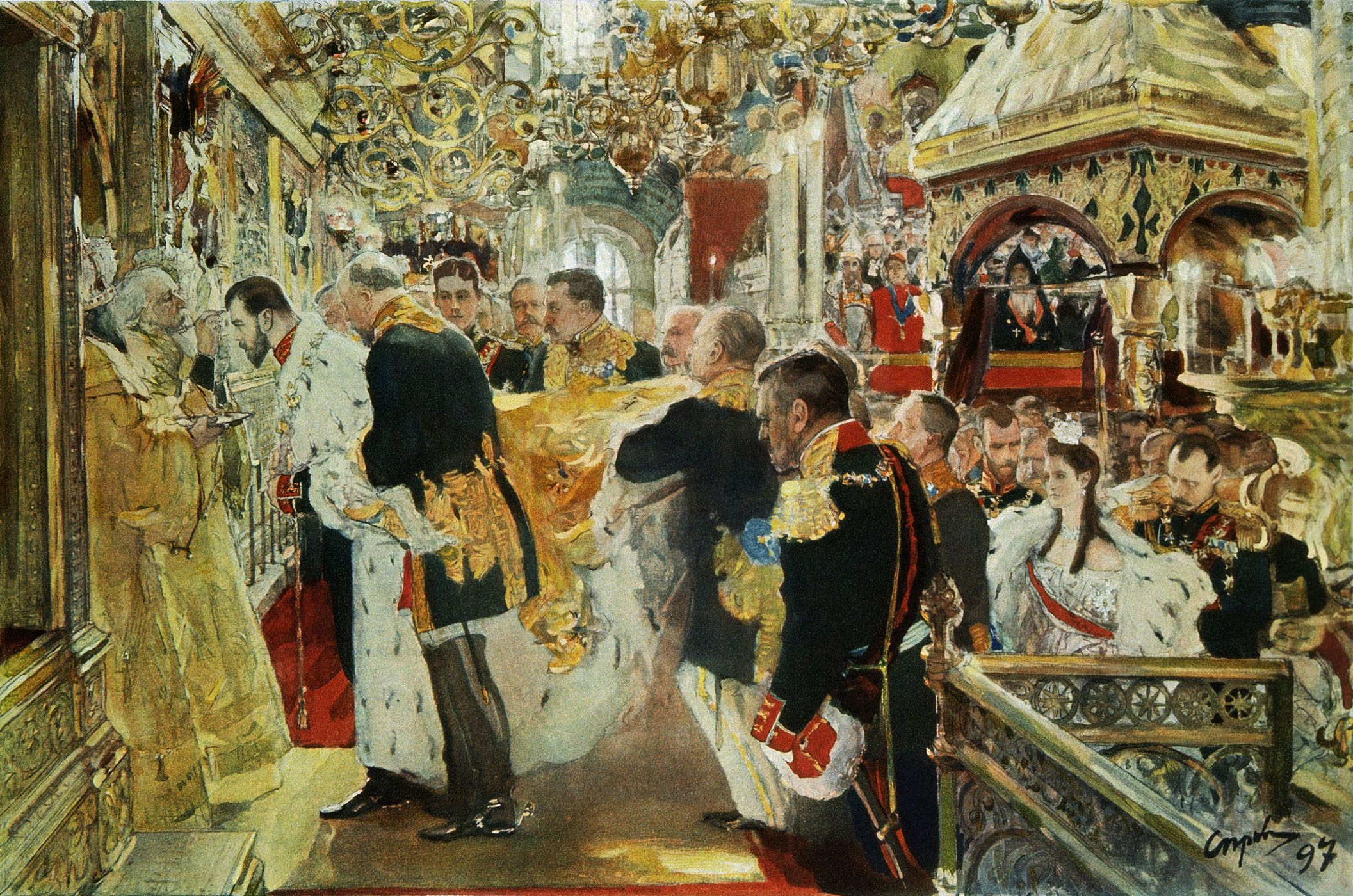
Anointing of Tsar Nicholas II of Russia during his coronation in 1896 at the iconostasis of Dormition Cathedral, Moscow. The Metropolitan Palladius is using an anointing brush to administer the oil of catechumens.

In Post-Soviet Russia, the anointing brush is used by the self-proclaimed "Orthodox psychotherapist" Grigorii Grigoriev in a ritual for alcoholic patients. Grigoriev has preserved some of Soviet psychiatrist Alexander Dovzhenko's ritual structures but has replaced all biomedical representations with official religious elements from Russian Orthodoxy. After consulting with the patients, Grigoriev reads a prayer over them in Church Slavonic, then intones declaring them free of cravings for alcohol. The anointing brush is used to mark the conclusion the ritual by touching the patient upon their head with the brush.
