= Evdokia Bobyleva =

Soviet and Russian teacher

- Евдокия Бобылёва
- Born: Evdokia Fedorovna Bobyleva; 18 August 1919; Anastasovo, Odoyevsky District, Tula Oblast, Russian RSFSR
- Died: 29 August 2017 (aged 98); Tula Oblast, Russia
- Occupation: Teacher
- Years active: 1936–2010
- Spouse: Ivan Aleksandrovich Bobylev (m. 1939; died 1944)
- Awards: Order of the Badge of Honour; Order of the Patriotic War, Second Class; Order of Lenin; People's Teacher of the USSR

Evdokia Fedorovna Bobyleva (Russian: Евдокия Фёдоровна Бобылёва; 18 August 1919 – 29 August 2017) was a Soviet and Russian teacher who served as a deputy in the Congress of People's Deputies of the Soviet Union from 1989 to 1991 and in the Supreme Soviet of the Soviet Union in 1991. She worked for more than 70 years as an educator in the Tula Oblast, serving as director of the Odoevskaya Secondary School between 1966 and 2010. Bobyleva served on the Regional Committee of the Trade Union of Education Workers and was a delegate to the XIV Congress of Trade Unions of the USSR in 1968. She was awarded the Order of the Badge of Honour, the Order of the Patriotic War, Second Class, the Order of Lenin and the People's Teacher of the USSR.

== Biography ==
On 18 August 1919, Bobyleva was born into a peasant family in the village of Anastasovo, Odoyevsky District, Tula Oblast. She had two siblings. Following her graduation from Odoevsky Secondary School, she began working at the school in 1937, teaching the Russian language and Russian literature. She and her husband relocated to Riga in 1939, and served as a volunteer fighter in the Great Patrotic War, using Anti-aircraft warfare.

Following her demobilisation in 1944, Bobyleva went back to the Tusa Oblast and enrolled at Tula State Pedagogical University. She later graduated from the university, and was appointed head teacher of the Odoevskaya Secondary School in 1956. Bobyleva was appointed the school's permanent director in August 1966, and served in that capacity until September 2010; declining health prevented her from teaching by 2006 but was able to organise events for the school. During her tenure at the school, children received certificates to drive tractors, operate as mechanics-adjusters and machine milking masters; the experience of training agricultural personnel was adopted in other Oblasts. Bobyleva successfully lobbied for the local police to receive new cars, give the Oblast with pipes to transport gas, and repair several Tusa Oblast schools and hospital as well as provide them with new equipment.

She was frequently elected to serve on the Regional Committee of the Trade Union of Education Workers. Bobyleva was a participant in the 1962 World Congress for General Disarmament and Peace and gained election to the XIV Congress of Trade Unions of the USSR as a delegate six years later. In March 1989, she was elected to serve as a deputy in the Congress of People's Deputies of the Soviet Union. Bobyleva was appointed to the Supreme Soviet of the Soviet Union in May 1991, having earlier been appointed to serve on the USSR Supreme Soviet Committee on Public Education on 14 June 1990. She was on the All-Russian Organization of War and Labor Veterans, was a member of the All-Union Central Council of Trade Unions for four years and was a member of the OK Trade Union for eight years. A book on Bobyleva, «Евдокия свет Фёдоровна», was authored by one of her pupils, Vladimir Uspensky.

== Personal life ==
She was married to the rural school director Ivan Aleksandrovich Bobylev from 1939 to his death in April 1944. Bobyleva did not remarry. She died on 29 August 2017, and was buried at Odoevsky City Cemetery.

== Awards ==
She was made a Honored School Teacher of the RSFSR on 4 February 1962. In 1976, Bobyleva received the Order of the Badge of Honour, the Order of the Patriotic War, Second Class in 1983 and the Order of Lenin in 1986. On 10 May 1990, Mikhail Gorbachev, the President of the Soviet Union, awarded her the People's Teacher of the USSR. Bobyleva received the Order of Kindness in 2003. She was made an honorary citizen of the Tula Oblast on 27 August 2008 by the Governor of Tula Oblast "for outstanding services to the Russian Federation and the Tula Region, high personal authority, many years of conscientious work, great personal contribution in the socio-economic development of the Tula Region." In 2014, Bobyleva received the For a Special Contribution to the Development of the Tula Region "as a citizen whose activities brought significant results for the region in the state, political, economic, research, public and other spheres, which received wide public fame and recognition." She was also awarded the Commemorative medal "100 years of the Trade Unions of Russia" and the Medal of Krupskaya.
