= Timofti =

Timofti is a surname. Notable people with the surname include:

- Mihai Timofti (1948–2023), Moldovan director, actor, musician, and senior lecturer
- Nicolae Timofti (born 1948), Moldovan politician, president of the Republic of Moldova

== See also ==
- Timofte
