= Anatolie Popușoi =

Moldovan politician (born 1949)

Anatolie Popușoi OR

Member of the Moldovan Parliament
- In office 5 May 2009 – 28 November 2010
- Parliamentary group: Party of Communists
- In office 5 April 1994 – 21 April 1998
- Preceded by: Timofei Moșneaga
- Parliamentary group: Democratic Agrarian Party
- In office 17 April 1990 – 27 February 1994
- Constituency: Anenii Noi

Personal details
- Born: April 3, 1949 (age 77) Țîplești, Moldavian SSR, Soviet Union

Anatolie Popușoi (born 3 April 1949) is a Moldovan politician. He is a former member of the Moldovan Parliament, as well as leader of the Agrarian Party of Moldova.
