= Gheorghe Ghidirim =

Moldovan physician and politician

Gheorghe Ghidirim OR

1st Minister of Health
- In office 6 June 1990 – 5 April 1994
- President: Mircea Snegur
- Prime Minister: Mircea Druc; Valeriu Muravschi; Andrei Sangheli
- Preceded by: Chiril Draganiuc (as Minister of Health of the Moldavian SSR)
- Succeeded by: Timofei Moșneaga

People's Deputy of the Soviet Union
- In office 26 March 1989 – 6 June 1990
- Constituency: Căușeni

Personal details
- Born: April 22, 1939 (age 87) Palanca, Kingdom of Romania
- Party: Popular Front of Moldova
- Education: Chișinău State Institute of Medicine
- Profession: Physician

Gheorghe Ghidirim (born 22 April 1939) is a physician from Moldova and a former Health Minister of Moldova in Mircea Druc Cabinet.

He is a member of the Academy of Sciences of Moldova, university professor and Head of “Nicolae Anestiadi” Surgery Chair Nicolae Testemiţanu State University of Medicine and Pharmacy. Gheorghe Ghidirim is the President of Moldovan Surgeons Associations, coordinating-academician of the Health Sciences Section, Editor of Sciences Academy’s Bulletin.

He is a leader of the Democratic Forum of Romanians in Moldova.

== Biography ==
Gheorghe Ghidirim was born on April 22, 1939, in the Palanca commune, Olăneşti, Cetatea-Albă County, Kingdom of Romania. He graduated with honours the Tighina Medical College, then, worked as a feldsher at the Tudora Hospital. Then he continued his studies at the State Medical Institute in Chișinău.

Several medical organizations and institutions in the country and abroad have chosen Gheorghe Ghidirim as honorary member, among them Romanian Society of Surgery, Laparoscopic Surgery Society of Romania, “N. Pirogov” International Society of Surgery in Russia; International Society of Hepato-Bilio-Pancreatic Surgery; World Society of Surgery. At the VIIIth Congress of Surgeons of the Republic of Moldova he was elected president of the National Surgical Society.

In 1993, Ghidirim was elected as a full member of the Academy of Sciences of Moldova and president of the newly formed Academy of Medicine. In the same year, he became an honorary member of the Academy of Medical Sciences of Romania, and in 1994, he became an honorary member of the Romanian Society of Surgery. His scientific work includes over 400 scientific papers, 35 monographs, 2 textbooks, and 15 patents.

G. Ghidirim was the MP of the last parliament of the USSR, a member of the government and the Minister of Health. He participated in elaborating of the Declaration of Independence of the Republic of Moldova, and on adopting the anthem, coat of arms and flag of the country.

== Awards ==
- Order of the Republic (Moldova), 2005
- "Nicolae Testemițanu" Medal, 2004
- Order of Work Glory, 2000
- Emeritus of the Republic of Moldova ("Om Emerit al Republicii Moldova"), 1995
