= Coding (therapy) =

Russian alternative therapeutic methods used to treat addictions

Coding (also known as the Dovzhenko method) is a catch-all term for various Russian and post-Soviet alternative therapeutic methods used to treat addictions, in which the therapist attempts to scare patients into abstinence from a substance they are addicted to by convincing them that they will be harmed or killed if they use it again. Each method involves the therapist pretending to insert a "code" into patients' brains that will ostensibly provoke a strong adverse reaction should it come into contact with the addictive substance. The methods use a combination of theatrics, hypnosis, placebos, and drugs with temporary adverse effects to instill the erroneous beliefs. Therapists may pretend to "code" patients for a fixed length of time, such as five years. Coding was created by Aleksandr Dovzhenko, a Soviet and Ukrainian psychiatrist.

== Methods ==
In the case of alcohol addiction, the procedure may be carried out with a drug that temporarily affects the respiratory system when mixed with alcohol, administered under hypnosis. The therapist gives patients the drug, then allows them a small amount of alcohol, which triggers an adverse reaction and makes them erroneously believe that the therapy has had a long-term effect. Another method involves the therapist giving patients hypnotic suggestions during a head massage, with the message that alcohol will cause blindness or paralysis.

In one method, the therapist numbs patients' mouths with local anaesthetic, then places electrodes with a very weak current into their mouths. This is to make patients believe that the "nerve points" in their mouth are being "manipulated" and that it is no longer safe for them to drink alcohol. A further method involves the therapist using a special helmet to persuade patients that the therapist's suggestions are controlling their minds. Typically, therapists will also make patients sign a disclaimer, supposedly absolving the therapist of any responsibility should the patient use the addictive substance and suffer ill effects or die.

Sometimes "coding" means sewing a capsule with disulfiram under the skin, which is a working method of treating alcoholism, but temporary and potentially harmful.

== See also ==
- Aversion therapy
- Mind-body interventions
- Neurolinguistic programming
