= Alexander Dovzhenko (psychiatrist) =

Soviet physician

Alexander Dovzhenko PDU
- Александр Довженко
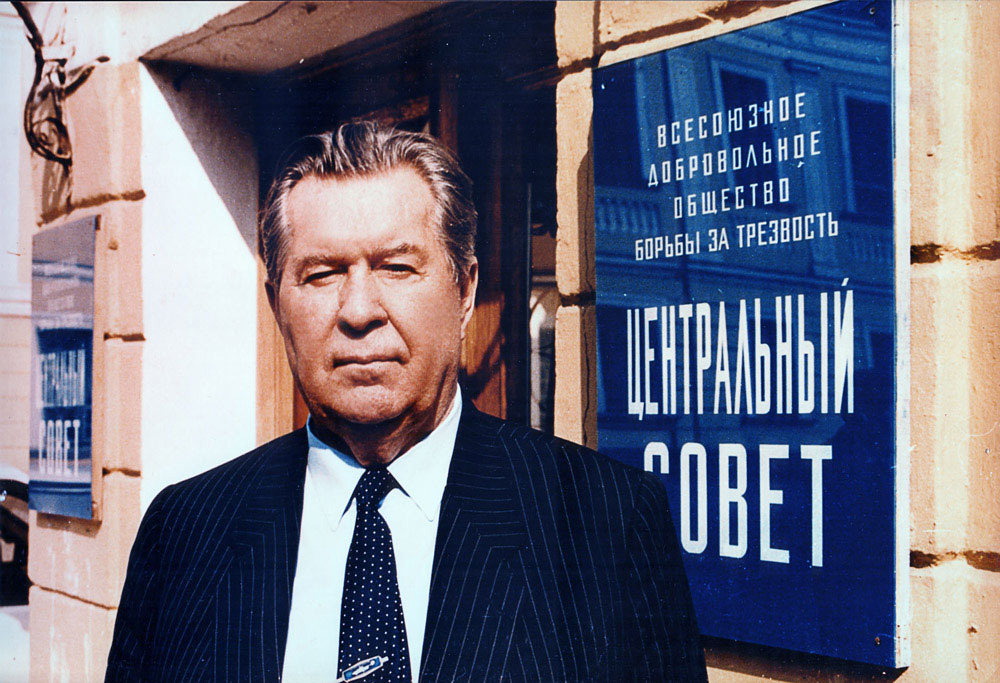
- Dovzhenko in 1989
- Born: March 29, 1918; Sevastopol, Russian SFSR
- Died: February 4, 1995 (aged 76); Feodosia, Autonomous Republic of Crimea, Ukraine

Aleksandr Romanovich Dovzhenko (Russian: Александр Романович Довженко; Ukrainian: Олександр Романович Довженко; 29 March 1918 – 4 February 1995) was a Soviet and Ukrainian physician, psychiatrist, psychotherapist and substance abuse counselor. He is most famous for developing Dovzhenko's method ("Coding").

== Biography ==
Aleksandr Dovzhenko was born on March 29, 1918, in a family of a seaman.

In 1936 Dovzhenko has entered the Crimean Medical Institute and was graduated in 1941. After graduation Dovzhenko worked as a doctor in various places, where he began to implement modern psycho-therapeutic methods. In 1948 he was appointed as chief physician of a dermato-venerologic clinic in Feodosia. Afterwards for some time Dovzhenko worked in a medical office of the Feodosian Sea Port.

In 1977–1985 Dovzhenko worked as senior researcher in the V. P. Protopopov Research Institute of Clinical and Experimental Neurology and Psychiatry in Kharkiv. In the Kharkiv Institute for Doctors' Improvement Dovzhenko graduated from practical hypnosis courses.

The approbation of Dovzhenko's approach, its theoretical and scientific foundation was held in during 1979-1980s in the V. P. Protopopov Research Institute of Clinical and Experimental Neurology and Psychiatry in Kharkiv.

In 1984 Dovzhenko's method of therapy was recognized as an invention and registered by the State Committee on Inventions and Discoveries titled as "The Treatment of Сhronic Alcoholism based on Dovzhenko's method". Dovzhenko's method was approved by the Department for Implementing of Medication and Medical Equipment of the Ministry of Healthcare and by the Ministry of Healthcare of Soviet Ukraine.

Professor Irina Pyatnitskaya, who was a prominent scientist, clinician and a co-founder of modern Russian narcology, has highly assessed doctor Dovzhenko's method of therapy:

"The head of the Republican Narcology Center of the Soviet Ukraine's Ministry of Healthcare A. R. Dovzhenko has achieved exceptional results. A. R. Dovzhenko has created a model of sobriety. The method of therapy is aimed at formation in the brain of an addict of so-called "sobriety dominant". The method, that was elaborated and used by A. R. Dovzhenko, has an incredible effect: from 82% to 93% of his patients give up drinking and become full-fledged human beings."

In 1985 in Feodosia's Stamboli Palace building Dovzhenko opened the Republican Narcological Psychotherapy Center under the Ministry of Healthcare of Soviet Ukraine.

Aleksandr Dovzhenko died in Feodosia on February 4, 1995, after a second stroke.

== Rewards ==
- Distinguished Doctor of the Ukrainian SSR (Kiev, 1985)
- People's Doctor of the USSR (Moscow, May 23, 1989)
- Order of Friendship of Peoples
- Honorary citizen of Feodosia (1995)

== Memory and recognition ==
- In Feodosia (1995) and later in Kharkiv (1996) three memorial plaques were installed in memory of Aleksandr Dovzhenko. One of the plaques was installed on a facade of the building of the Feodosia's Sea Port polyclinic where Dovzhenko worked for over 20 years.
- In the 1980s and 1990s the number of pop-science films, created at Moscow and Kyiv film studios, exposed the works of the A. R. Dovzhenko Republican Narcological Psychotherapy Center (Республиканский Наркологический Психотерапевтический Центр им. А.Р. Довженко), located in Feodosia. On the premises of the center there is an educational and internship programs based on Dovzhenko's method aimed at psychotherapists specialized in narcology from almost all regions of post-USSR.
- International scientific-practical conference named "Dovzheko's readings" arranged annually since 1999 in Kharkiv. The institutions that organize this event include National Academy of Medical Sciences of Ukraine, Institute of Neurology, Psychiatry and Narcology of the National Academy of Medical Sciences of Ukraine, Kharkiv Medical Academy of Post-graduate Education, the Ministry of Healthcare of Ukraine and the Ukrainian neurologist, psychiatrist and narcologist community. The collection of scientific works based on conference results are published.
- Dovzhenko education charity was created in Moscow.
- The Republican Narcological Psychotherapy Center under the Ministry of Healthcare of the Autonomous Republic of Crimea in Feodosia was named after of A. R. Dovzhenko.
- Alexander Dovzhenko was buried at Novoe Kladbishche in Feodosia, where his marble bust was installed. A monument in his honor was constructed in the center of Feodosia.
- Following the decision of Ukraine's and Russia's Ministries of Healthcare, a medal named after People's Doctor of the USSR A. R. Dovzhenko was established:

"The medal is issued annually to medical workers, teachers, writers, sportsmen, public figures and statesmen, as well as other prominent figures who have made a great contribution into releasing people from any addiction, an introduction and propaganda of healthy lifestyle".

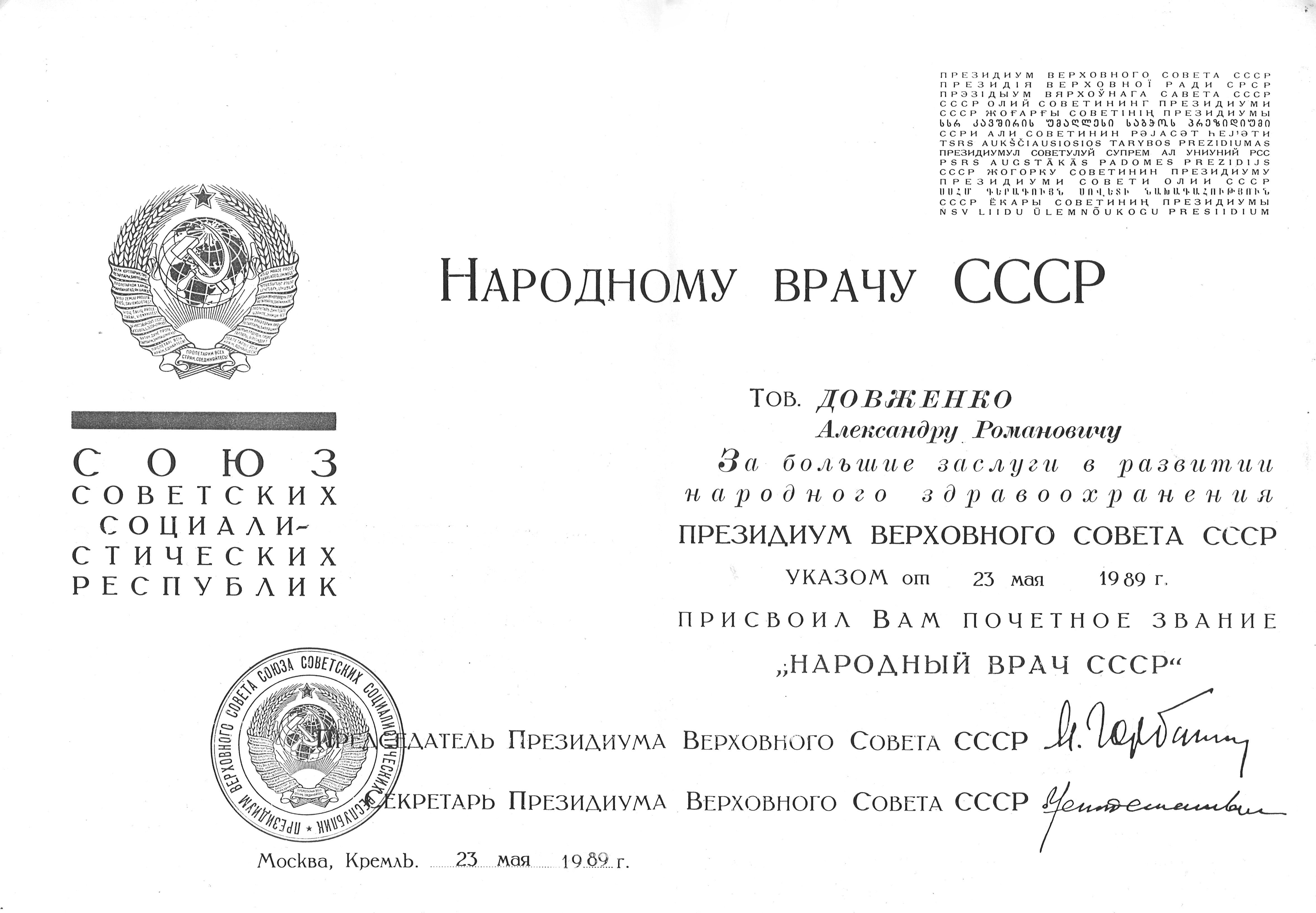
Decree of the Presidium of the Supreme Soviet of the USSR on awarding A. R. Dovzhenko the honorary title "People's Doctor of the USSR" "for the great service in the development of public health". These documents were kindly provided by the researchers of the Feodosia Local Lore Museum.
