= Timofte =

Timofte is a Romanian surname. Notable persons with this name include:

- Daniel Timofte (born 1967), retired Romanian football midfielder and currently a manager
- Ion Timofte (born 1967), Romanian retired footballer
- Radu Timofte (1949–2009), Romanian soldier, politician and spy chief

== See also ==
- Timofti
