= Nicolae Testemițanu =

Moldovan surgeon and politician (1927–1986)

Nicolae Testemițanu OR
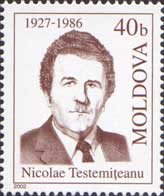
- 2002 stamp of Moldova

Minister of Health of the Moldavian SSR
- In office 4 April 1963 – 5 May 1968
- Premier: Alexandru Diordiță
- Preceded by: Andrei Diskalenko
- Succeeded by: Ion Sorocean

Rector of the Chișinău State Institute of Medicine
- In office 1959–1963
- Preceded by: Nikolai Starostenko
- Succeeded by: Vasile Anestiadi

Director of the Republican Clinical Hospital
- In office 1955–1958
- Succeeded by: Iulian Kaspersky

Personal details
- Born: 1 August 1927 Ochiul Alb, Kingdom of Romania
- Died: 20 September 1986 (aged 59) Chișinău, Moldavian SSR, Soviet Union
- Party: Communist Party of Moldavia
- Education: Chișinău State Institute of Medicine
- Profession: Physician

Nicolae Testemițanu (1 August 1927 – 20 September 1986) was a Moldovan and Soviet surgeon, hygienist, and politician.

== Political career ==
Upon graduating, he worked as a surgeon at the District Hospital in Riscani. He was Rector of State University of Medicine and Pharmacy from 1959 to 1963, where he founded four faculties there – Dentistry (1959), Advanced Training of Doctors (1963), Preventive Medicine (1963), and Pharmacy (1964).

He served as minister of health of the Moldavian SSR between 1963 and 1968, after which he was demoted for allegedly promoting too many autochthonous medical personnel, contrary to Soviet Russification policies. Upon his dismissal, he returned to working at the Department of Social Medicine and the Health Care Organization.

== Honours ==
The State University of Medicine and Pharmacy in Chișinău is named after him. A bust of the figure has been erected on the Alley of Distinguished Doctors and Scientists, next to the Chisinau University of Medicine and Pharmacy. It was created by Moldovan sculptor Veaceslav Jiglițchi.

== Gallery ==
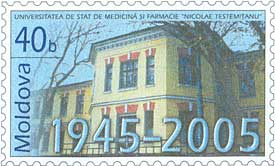
Nicolae Testemițanu State University of Medicine and Pharmacy
