= Dimitrie Dragomir =

Bessarabian-Romanian politician

Dumitru Dragomir

Member of the Moldovan Parliament
- In office 1917–1918

Personal details
- Born: 26 October 1884 Volintiri

Dumitru Dragomir (26 October 1884 – 20th century) was a Bessarabian and Romanian politician. He was a member of Sfatul Țării and voted the Union of Bessarabia with Romania on 27 March 1918.

== Biography ==
Dumitru Dragomir was born in Volintiri. He served as Member of the Moldovan Parliament (1917–1918).

== Gallery ==
Moldovan stamp, 1998

== Bibliography ==
- Gheorghe E. Cojocaru, Sfatul Țării: itinerar, Civitas, Chişinău, 1998, ISBN 9975-936-20-2
- Mihai Taşcă, Sfatul Țării şi actualele autorităţi locale, "Timpul de dimineaţă", no. 114 (849), June 27, 2008 (page 16)
