= Timofei Moșneaga Republican Clinical Hospital =

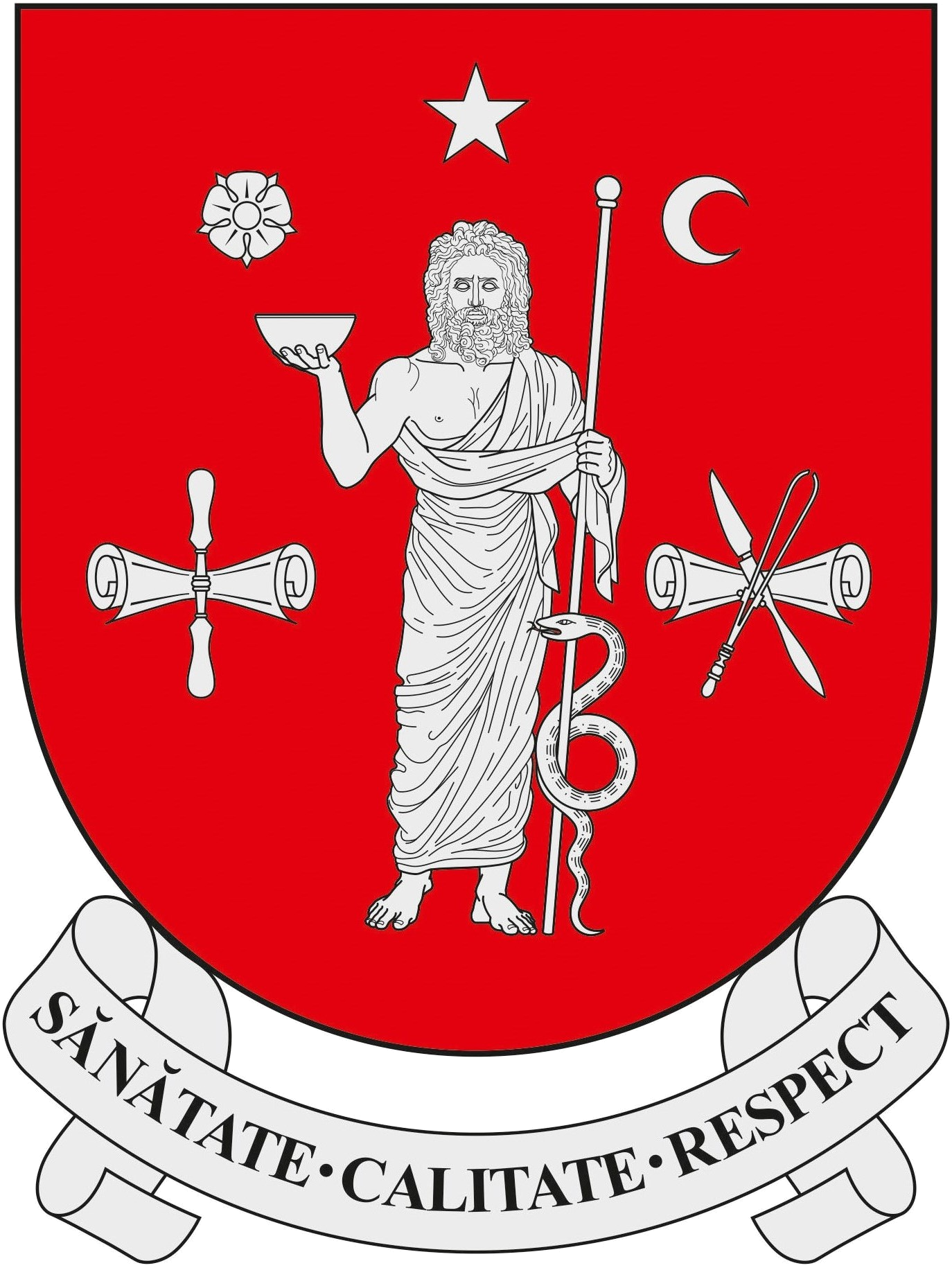

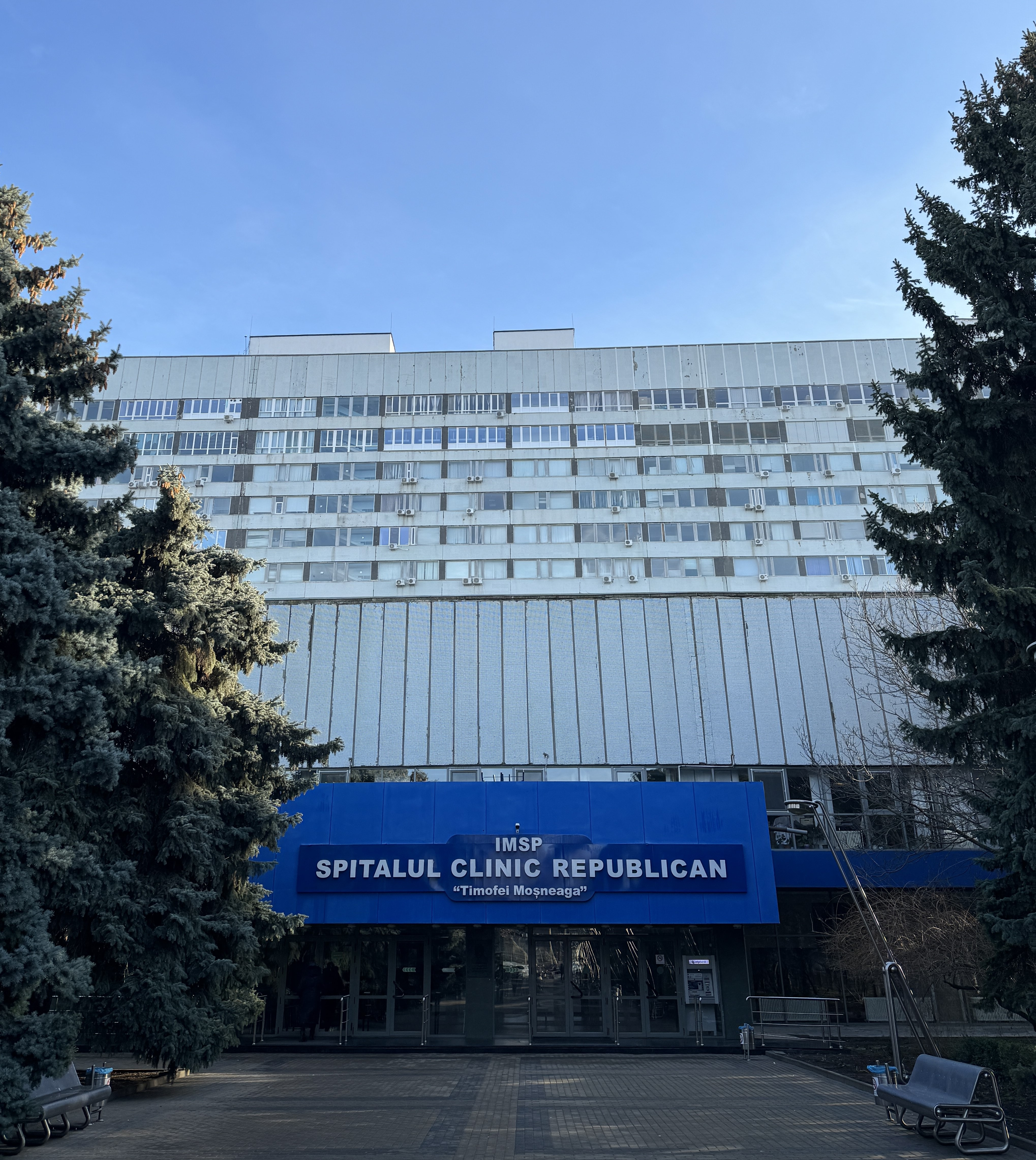
- The hospital's main building, 2023

Geography
- Location: 29 Nicolae Testemițanu Street, Chișinău, Moldova
- Coordinates: 46°59′36.612″N 28°50′0.518″E

Organisation
- Care system: Public
- Type: General
- Affiliated university: Nicolae Testemițanu State University of Medicine and Pharmacy

Services
- Standards: ISO 9001
- Emergency department: Yes
- Beds: 772

Helipads
- Helipad: Yes

History
- Former names: Provincial Zemstvo Hospital; Republican Clinical Hospital
- Founded: 26 December 1817; 208 years ago

Links
- Website: scr.md
- Other links: Facebook; YouTube

The Timofei Moșneaga Republican Clinical Hospital (SCR; Romanian: Spitalul Clinic Republican „Timofei Moșneaga") is the oldest and largest medical institution in Moldova. The hospital is located in Chișinău and has 772 beds and 22 departments. It serves as the main clinical base for 15 departments and advanced courses of the Nicolae Testemițanu State University of Medicine and Pharmacy.

The hospital is named after its longest-serving director, Timofei Moșneaga, who led the institution for over forty years.

== History ==
Initially, the facility had the status of a municipal hospital. It was the first medical institution in Bessarabia and was built with the support of sponsors and residents of Chișinău. The hospital opened on 26 December 1817. The first building had one and a half levels, housing five wards with 36 beds, where patients with therapeutic, surgical and gynaecological problems were treated. The medical staff provided paramedicine services.

In 1842, another building was added. It had specialized units of therapy, surgery, ophthalmology and sexually transmissible diseases. In 1860, the staff consisted of one medical doctor (also the manager), a senior medical assistant, 3 junior medical assistants, 27 nurses, a linen mistress, a clerk, a copyist and a priest. A pharmacy operated on hospital premises.

In 1870, the institution was transferred to the Gubernskoe Zemstvo (the provincial government) and its name changed to Gubernial Hospital. The facility then consisted of 100 beds, with a staff of 13 medical doctors and 40 medical assistants.

The need for medical staff, especially medical assistants and midwives, became more and more pressing. In 1872 the School of Medical Assistants and Midwives was founded. The first class of 17 students finished school in 1873 and remained to work at the hospital.

In 1876, special units for microscopy, morph-pathology and animal testing opened. In order to stop the spread of infectious diseases, a unit for vaccination against smallpox was formed. Over the years, the Gubernatorial Hospital was considered an important centre for the education and continuous training of doctors from the cities and districts of Bessarabia.

The two World Wars gravely affected the activity of the Gubernial Hospital. Bombing left its buildings in ruins. It had to be rebuilt and re-equipped. Its name then became Republican Clinical Hospital. The institution eventually became the clinical base for the Chișinău Institute of Medicine. In 1961, the first successful heart surgery took place. By 1966, 10,000 patients had received medical care.

In 1967, when the hospital was celebrating its 150th anniversary, it had 10 units for stationary treatment, a consulting polyclinic for the inhabitants of rural areas, an AVIASAN (sanitary aviation) department and numerous labs and diagnostic rooms, fitted with modern equipment. Units included anaesthesiology, endocrinology, cardiothoracic and maxillofacial surgery. The artificial kidney unit opened there and was among the first in the Soviet Union. Clinical methods included laparoscopy, splenetic petrography, phlebography, electro-chemigraphy and others. Extracorporeal dialysis and cardiac defibrillation were applied, new methods of anaesthesia were added and the laboratory of nuclear medicine was created. In 1977 the RCH moved to new premises. This facility permitted a significant rise in quality and efficiency, and helped to improve and diversify the diagnostic methods and activity of labs and specialized units. Over 200 new diagnostics and treatments were implemented.

== Staff ==
Between 1966 and 1996, 50 medical doctors were awarded PhDs in medicine, while 5 earned a M.D. degree. These specialists took part in international congresses, symposia and conferences.

During the first period of transition to a free market economy, the hospital faced a difficult situation, which improved with the 2004 implementation of medical insurance.

== Operation ==
The hospital operates on the basis of a contract with the National Company for Medical Insurance (NCMI), which provides regular financing. The contract protects drug supply, provides modern medical equipment, new medical services and treatment methods.

Rural inhabitants represent more than 85% of the patients.

The Timofei Moșneaga Republican Clinical Hospital now has 772 beds and 22 units, cared for by 1800 qualified specialists. It is the clinical base of 15 departments of the Nicolae Testemițanu State University of Medicine and Pharmacy and of its training program.

== Directors ==
- Nicolae Testemițanu (1955–1958)
- Iulian Kaspersky (1958–1960)
- Timofei Moșneaga (1960–1994; 1997–2003)
- Dumitru Doneț (acting) (1994–1997)
- Mihai Ouș (2003–2010)
- Andrei Usatîi (2010–2011)
- Serghei Popa (acting) (2011–2015)
- Anatol Ciubotaru (2015–2020)
- Andrei Uncuța (2020–2026)
- Andrei Galescu (acting) (2026–present)

== Awards ==
- Order of the Republic (26 December 2017) – "In appreciation of the outstanding merits in the development of healthcare, for the professionalism shown by medical personnel in the implementation of advanced diagnostic and treatment methods and for the substantial contribution to the training of highly qualified specialists."
