= Volintiri =

- Commune and village
- Seal

- Location in Moldova
- Coordinates: 46°26′N 29°36′E
- Country: Moldova
- District: Ștefan Vodă District

Population (2014 census)
  - Total: 3,268
- Time zone: UTC+2 (EET)
  - Summer (DST): UTC+3 (EEST)

Volintiri (old name: Volontirovca) is a commune in Ștefan Vodă District, Moldova. It is on the southern border with Ukraine 138 km south of the Moldovan capital, Chișinău. It is composed of a single village, Volintiri.

The town is relively new having been founded between 1824 and 1828 by veterans of the Russo-Turkish War (1806–1812), and originally known as Bebei. The town was part of the Romanian Cetatea Albă County until 1938, Ținutul Nistru between 1938 and 1940, then it was incorporated into the Ștefan Vodă district.

Notable landmarks include the Parcul din Volintiri memorial and the biserica din volintri church, the casa de culture museum, 18 ancient burial mounds and the City Hall, built in 1964.

== Notable people ==
- Maria Bieșu, opera singer.
- Dumitru Dragomir, Romanian politician
