= Kishinev Ghetto =

Jewish ghetto in Chișinău (Kishinev), Romania (1941–1942)

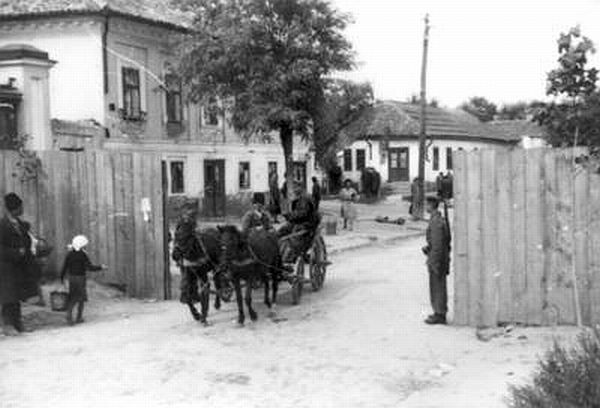
Kishinev Ghetto, 1941

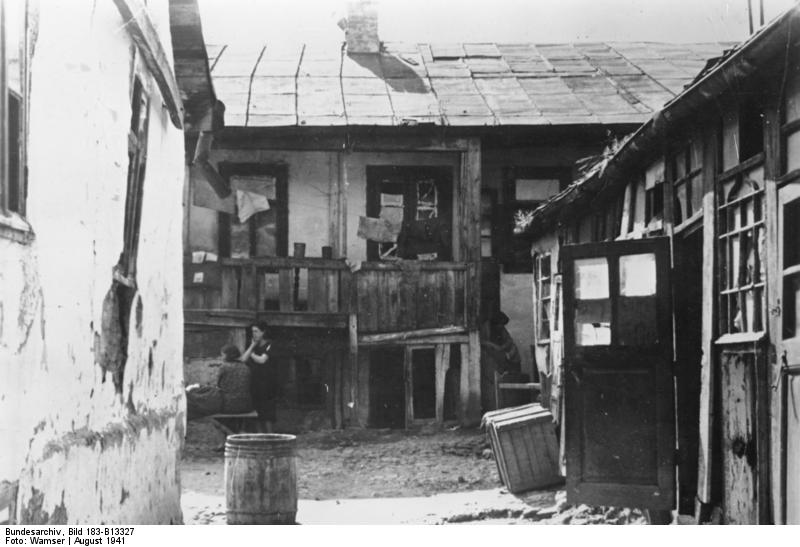
Kishinev Ghetto, August 1941

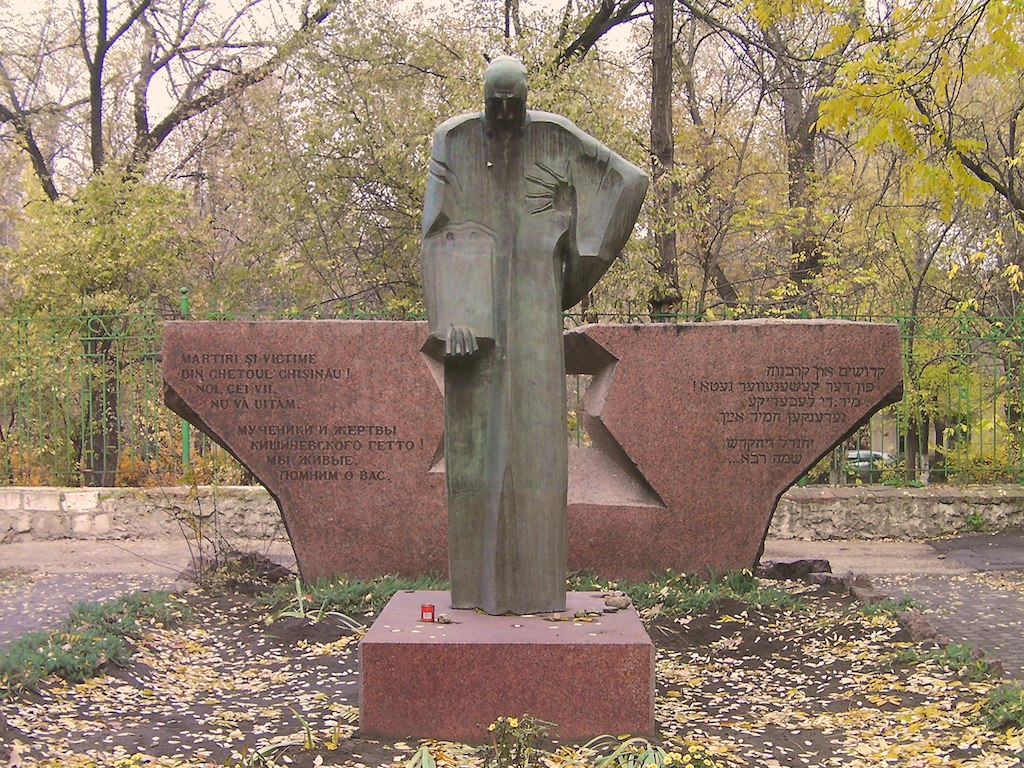
Holocaust Memorial, Chișinău; designed by sculptor Naum Epelbaumm and architect Simeon Shoihet

The Kishinev Ghetto, also known as the Chișinău Ghetto (Romanian: Ghetoul din Chișinău; Russian: Кишинёвское гетто; Hebrew: גטו קישינב), was a Jewish ghetto in Chișinău (Kishinev), Romania (now Moldova), established on 25 July 1941. It closed in April 1942.

== History ==
The ghetto's administration was established on 25 July 1941 by the Romanian authorities related to the Bessarabia Governorate. It was under dual control—that of the Romanian and Nazi German commandant's offices. Starting on 5 August 1941, Jews living in Kishinev were required to wear a yellow star on their clothing. Mass killings happened during the combined Romanian–German drive in the Bessarabia region.

The Kishinev Ghetto was closed in April 1942. The exact number of deaths is not known, but through research one estimated number of deaths is around 10,000 people.

== See also ==
- Kishinev pogrom, anti-Jewish attacks in Chișinău (Kishinev), Russian Empire, held 19–21 April 1903
- Pale of Settlement (1791–1917), Jewish residents of the western region of the Russian Empire
- Guttman Landau (c. 1877–1942), Bessarabian Jewish leader
