= Maria Bieșu =

Moldovan singer

Maria Bieșu OR PAU
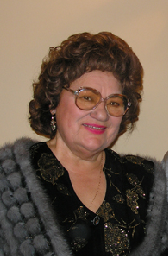
- Bieșu in 2005
- Born: 3 August 1935; Volintiri, Kingdom of Romania (now Moldova)
- Died: 16 May 2012 (aged 76); Chișinău, Moldova
- Citizenship: Moldova; Soviet Union
- Education: Chișinău State Conservatory
- Occupation: operatic soprano
- Years active: 1962–2012

Maria Bieșu (3 August 1935 – 16 May 2012) was a Moldovan opera singer. Debuting in 1961, she eventually went on to become the lead vocalist of the Moldova National Opera Ballet. Her artistic excellence brought her international recognition and invitations to sing in other countries, like Japan and Italy, where she performed at the Milan Opera from 1965 to 1967.

== Biography ==
Maria Bieșu was born in Volintiri, into a peasant family where everyone loved to sing. Her parents were Luca and Tatiana Bieșu. While studying in school, and then at the agricultural technical college, Maria began to perform at amateur concerts. The teachers at the Chișinău Conservatory and the Minister of Culture himself, after hearing Maria sing, sent her to study at the conservatory in 1955.

She debuted as a soloist in the country's popular orchestra of Moldavian folk music – "Fluieraş" with the song "Struguraş de pe colină" at a national competition alongside the famous Tamara Ciobanu and Sergei Lunchevici.

Bieșu was attracted to the opera stage, and after finishing the conservatory in 1961 she joined the troupe of the Moldova National Opera Ballet, and debuted in Tosca. In a short period she prepared the roles of Tatyana in Eugene Onegin, Liza in The Queen of Spades, and Cio-Cio-San in Madame Butterfly.

In 1965, the young singer was sent to the La Scala theatre in Milan, where the vocal teacher and conductor, and assistant to the great Toscanini - Enrico Piazza - became her tutor. During her two-year stay the parts of Cio-Cio-San, Tosca, Aida, and Leonora in Il trovatore were prepared. Her stay in Milan coincided with her participation in major international competitions. In 1966 she became a prize-winner at the Third International Tchaikovsky Competition, and in 1967 in Tokyo she won first prize and honorary Gold Cup prize, and won the title Best Cio-Cio-San in the World at the First International Competition in Memory of Miura Tamaki.

After Maria Bieșu's success at the Tokyo competition, her name gained widespread recognition. She played the roles of Cio-Cio-San, Aida, Leonora, Tosca, Tatyana and Liza on the stages of many theatres in Europe. In 1971 the Moldovan soprano was invited to New York's Metropolitan Opera to play the part of Nedda in Leoncavallo's Pagliacci. After playing this part she was offered a year-long contract for performing at the Metropolitan Opera. The New York Times wrote about this show: "Maria Bieșu is a charming and talented actress. She has a very beautiful and plastic voice. The singer carries herself surprisingly naturally on stage."

She was equally successful with lyrical parts (those such as Jolanta, Mimi), dramatic-passionate parts (such as Santuzza, Nedda, Turandot, Tosca) and bright-masterly parts (Leonora). There are more than thirty diverse roles in Bieșu's operatic record. To those previously mentioned are added Verdi's heroines – Leonora (La Forza del destino), Elisabeth (Don Carlos), Abigaille (Nabucco), Amelia (Un Ballo in maschera), and also Turandot in Puccini's opera, Adriana (Adriana Lecouvreur by Cilea), Nastasya (in Tchaikovsky's The Enchantress).

Maria Bieșu was also known for her chamber-concert activity. In chamber performances Bieșu is attracted to a delicate sense of style, careful work with musical and poetic texts, depth of emotional imagery, and emotional fullness and sincerity. Her concert repertoire was very wide, ranging from, Johann Sebastian Bach and George Frideric Handel to Caccini and Grétry to Schumann and Schubert and from Franz Liszt and Grieg to Ottorino Respighi and Fauré, Sergei Rachmaninoff and Tchaikovsky to Prokofiev and Sviridov, all the way to old Russian and Moldavian romances, folk songs, and compositions by contemporary Moldovan authors.

In 1986, Maria Bieșu recorded the role of Norma in Bellini's opera for the Russian company Melodiya, with Ludmilla Nam as Adalgisa, Gegham Grigoryan as Pollione, and Mark Ermler conducting the Bolshoi Opera Orchestra. The recording was issued on CD by Melodiya (MCD 160C), one of her greatest achievements.

== Awards ==
- 1970: People's Artist of the USSR
- 1974: USSR State Prize
- 1982: Lenin Prize
- 1990: Hero of Socialist Labour
- 1992: Order of the Republic of Moldova
- 2000: Order of the Star of Romania

== Official activities ==
- Professor at the G. Musicescu Academy of Music of Moldova
- President of the Union of Musicians of Moldova (1987)
- Vice-president of the World Union of Musicians of Moscow (1992)
- Founder and president of the International Opera and Ballet Festival "Maria Bieșu Invites" held annually in Chișinău
- Judge at many international and Moldovan competitions
- President of honor of the Women's Association of Moldova
