= Alexăndreni =

- Commune
- Location in Moldova
- Coordinates: 47°48′21″N 28°04′27″E
- Country: Moldova
- District: Sîngerei District

Government
  - Mayor: Victor Moraru (PSRM)

Population (2014)
  - Total: 5,594
- Time zone: UTC+2 (EET)
  - Summer (DST): UTC+3 (EEST)

Alexăndreni is a commune in Sîngerei District, Moldova. It is composed of five villages: Alexăndreni, Grigorești, Heciul Vechi, Țiplești and Țipletești. The village of Alexăndreni was established in 1837 as a Jewish agricultural colony, with Jews remaining as the majority of population prior to World War II. The commune is located northeast of Bălți.

== Population ==
Its population includes survivors of a generation that migrated west from Bessarabia in 1940 when the USSR occupied Bessarabia under the Molotov–Ribbentrop Pact with Nazi Germany. More Bessarabians migrated to what is now the Alexăndreni Commune when Romania lost the territory again in 1944 after recapturing it in 1941.

== Economy ==
The Commune is primarily an agricultural area, with a per capita GDP (PPP) of approximately $2300. One of its major employers is Südzucker Moldova SA, the top sugar beet producer in Moldova. The company, which operates 3 sugar factories in Moldova, regards its Alexăndreni sugar factory as its most logistically advanced. The firm's Alexăndreni agro-technical fleet automated agricultural processes in adjacent sugar beet fields at subsidized rates, yielding increased output from 17.9 metric tons per hectare (15.9 tons per acre) in 2003 to 42.0 t/ha (37.5 tons per acre) in 2008. Its technology spans from seed selection and management, soil fertilization and cultivation, to mechanized harvesting.Südzucker Moldova SA website (English)

== Energy ==
Alexăndreni Commune's energy supply, like that of the rest of the Republic of Moldova, depends almost totally (98%) from energy supply from outside its borders. The small amount generated internally includes electricity generated, in part, by a combined heat power (CHP) plant in North Bălţi. The CHP North-Bălți, with an installed capacity of 28 MW and an available power of 24 MW was put into operation in 1960. The CHP's of the region's sugar factories also serve as seasonal energy sources, and the sugar factory plant in Alexăndreni provides approximately 12 MW. These CHP's were put into operation between the years of 1956-1985, with an installed estimated capacity of about 20 MW. Thermal power is also generated by a municipal thermal power plant operating as an autonomous operating unit in North Bălți. The main fuel for this plant is natural gas, and the reserve one is residual fuel oil. The wear degree of the equipment is about 60%.

== Gallery ==
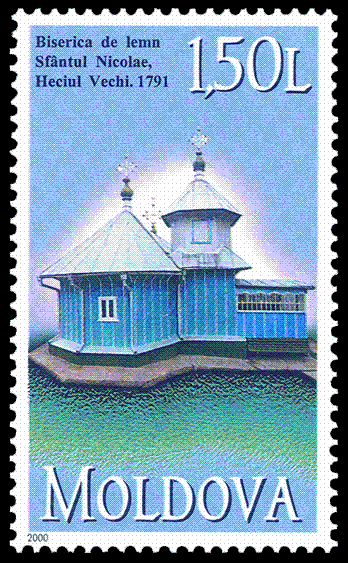
