= Dumbrăvița, Sîngerei =

Dumbrăvița
- Commune
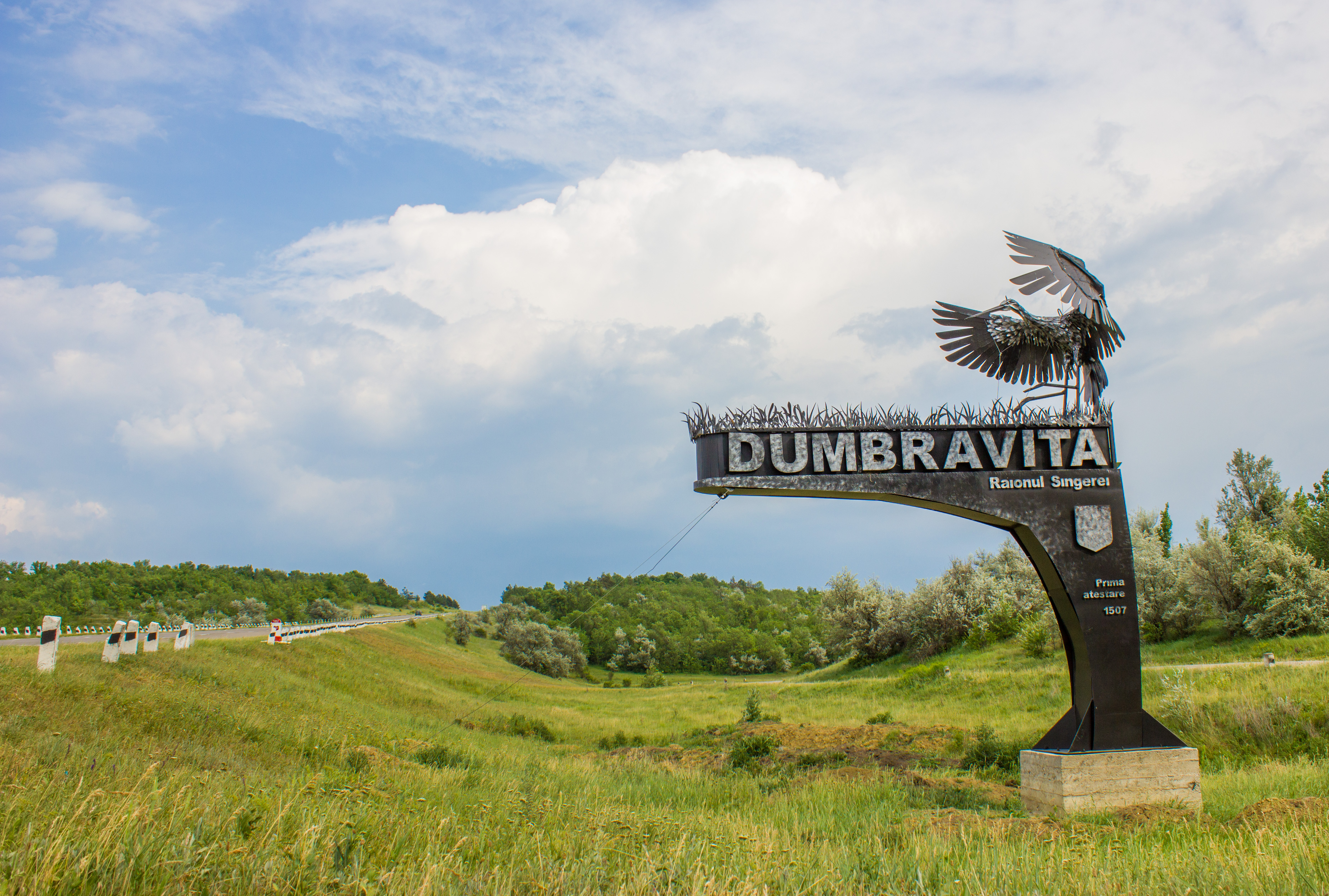

- Location within Moldova
- Coordinates: 47.4802777778°N 28.1144444444°E
- Country: Moldova
- District: Sîngerei District

Population (2014)
  - Total: 2,253
- Time zone: UTC+2 (EET)
  - Summer (DST): UTC+3 (EEST)

Dumbrăvița is a commune in Sîngerei District, Moldova. It is composed of three villages: Bocancea-Schit, Dumbrăvița and Valea lui Vlad. Valea lui Vlad is a former Jewish agricultural colony.
