= Batushansky =

Batushansky (Russian: Батушанский, Romanian: Batuşanschi, Portuguese: Batusanschi, Yiddish: באטושאנסקי) is a surname that originates from Bessarabia (present day Moldova) and literally means "of Batushany". There are multiple spelling variations, such as Batushanski, Batusanski, Botushansky, Botoshansky, Batouchansky, Batusanschi, etc.

== Origin ==
Although there is no place named Batushany, a number of populated places with similar names exist, including Botoşani in Romania's region of Moldavia and the village of Butuceni in the self-proclaimed Pridnestrovian Moldavian Republic in the Republic of Moldova. Historically, and occasionally to this day, both of these places are called Botushany in Russian (Ботушаны, pronounced identical to Batushany). The remaining towns with similar names either had not had a significant Jewish population or contain a "ch" ("ч") sound in their name rather than "sh" ("ш") and do not have a corresponding Russian exonym with "sh".

Both Botoşani and Butuceni are possible origins of the surname. Most Jews in Botoşani did not use surnames until the late 19th — early 20th century, and thus were likely to be referred to by place of origin upon relocation. On the other hand, Botoşani was beyond Russian Empire's borders, while Butuceni (and all of Transnistria) became part of Russia's Pale of Settlement since Russo-Turkish war of 1792. After Bessarabia was won from the Turks in 1806-1812 war, Russian authorities encouraged settlement of this area by ethnic minorities, and for a few decades in mid-19th century, permitted Jews to own or rent land there, offered tax breaks and postponed military draft. As a result, tens of thousands of Jews migrated from nearby areas within the Pale of Settlement, frequently receiving surnames based on their place of origin. Slavic ending "-sky" (or "-ski", "-ский" in Russian) suggests that the surname originated during the period of Russian rule.

Due to mass Jewish immigration from Eastern Europe, this surname and its variations occur in many parts in the world, including United States, Israel, France, Portugal and Brazil (Pernambuco and São Paulo). A few people with this surname may still live in Moldova, Ukraine and Russia.
