= Order of Labour (Moldova) =

Order of Moldova

Order of Labour Ordinul Muncii
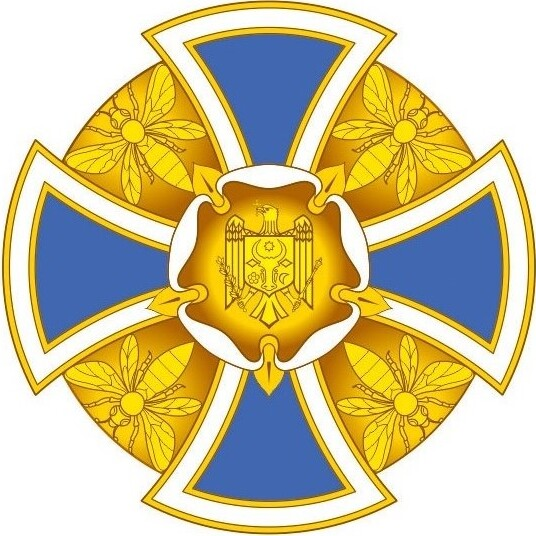
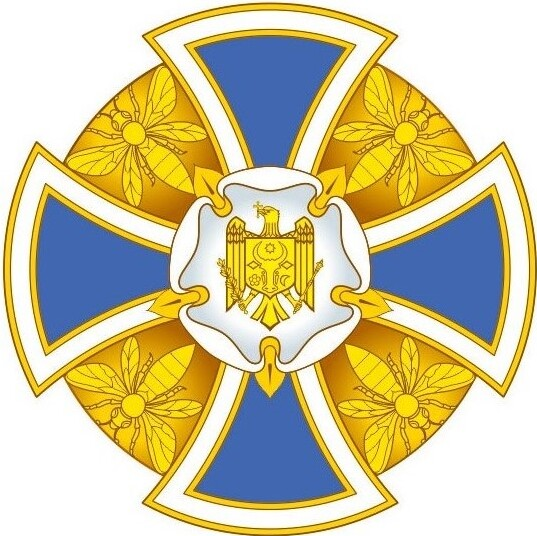
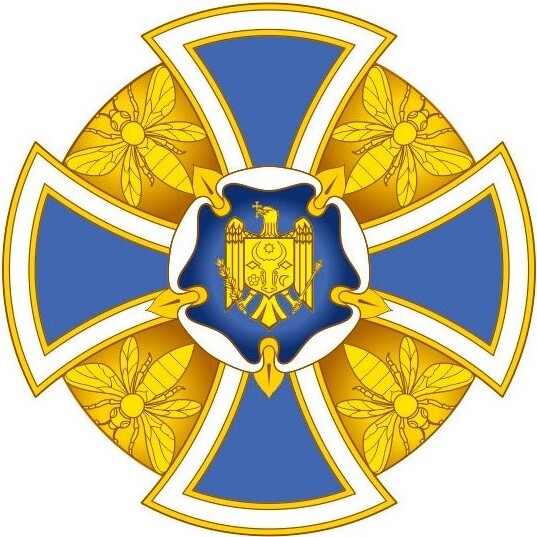

Awarded by the Republic of Moldova
- Type: Triple-grade order
- Established: 30 July 1992; 34 years ago
- Country: Moldova
- Eligibility: Moldovan individuals and organizations
- Status: Active

Statistics
- First induction: 1994

Precedence
- Next (higher): Order of Allegiance to the Motherland

The Order of Labour (Romanian: Ordinul Muncii) is a Moldovan official order conferred for outstanding achievements in an individual's field of work, esteemed public activity during their career, and great contributions to the development of the Moldovan cultural, scientific, socioeconomic, sporting and public spheres. The Order of Labour is awarded by the President of Moldova.

== History ==
The Order of Work Glory was established by statutory law, and passed in the Moldovan Parliament in 1992. According to Article 17(9) of the Law regarding state distinctions of the Republic of Moldova (Law nr. 1123 din 30.07.1992), "the Order of Work Merit is awarded for outstanding work and great success in all fields."

== Design ==
The exact specifications of the physical award can be found in the same law:

"[The Order] is made of tombac overlaid with gold, representing a somewhat convex eight-pointed star, composed of four rays representing stylized spikes of wheat and four beams with tapered sides. The center is an embossed, silver plated stylized serrated wheel and in its upper part, the inscription "Gloria Muncii" [The Glory of Labour] is embossed, and on the bottom – the inscription "Moldova." In the center of the wheel, the prominent image of the State Flag – blue, yellow and red stripes – is covered with enamel. At the bottom of the flag, there are two divergent laurel twigs covered with gold, and surrounded by vertical straight lines, covered with silver. The diameter of the Order is 45 mm."

— Law regarding state distinctions of the Republic of Moldova, Monitorul Oficial

== Recipients ==
=== Individual ===
- Nicolae Timofti
- Maia Sandu (23 July 2014)
- Igor Makarov
- Todur Zanet (2010)
- Gheorghe Ghidirim
- Pavel Filip (2014)
- Oleg Reidman

=== Collectives ===
- Nicolae Testemițanu State University of Medicine and Pharmacy (October 6, 2005)
- Joint Stock Company "Apă-Canal Chişinău" (December 11, 2012)
- Raisa Pakalo National College of Medicine and Pharmacy (June 5, 2014)
- Garment Factory "Ionel" (September 9, 2015)
- LUKOIL-Moldova (December 7, 2015)
