= People's Teacher of the USSR =

Award

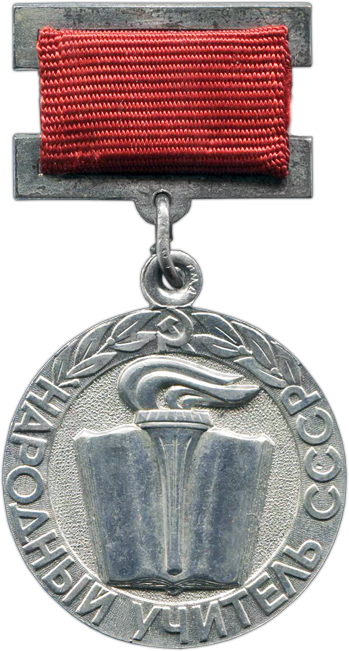
- Awarded for: Outstanding contributions to the national education system
- Country: USSR
- First award: December 30, 1977; 48 years ago

People's Teacher of the USSR (Russian: Народный учитель СССР) was an honorary title granted to teachers of the Soviet Union; it was established on 30 December 1977. Following the Dissolution of the Soviet Union (1990) the title was modified to National Teacher of the Russian Federation.

The title was conferred, to teachers of Soviet secondary or vocational schools and also to civil servants employed by educational institutions, for worthwhile contributions to the national education system and mainly in teaching communism to children and young people. It was bestowed owing proposals addressed by the USSR Education Department or by the National Education Committee; together with the medal a diploma of the Supreme Soviet's presidency was given to the awarded people.

== Design ==
The medal has a circular shape and its diameter is 30 mm. The central part of the front side is occupied by an open book and a torch encircled by the inscription "Народный учитель СССР" (People's Teacher of the USSR) and, above, two bay laurel branches and the hammer and sickle symbol. On the verso appears the inscription Народный учитель СССР — гордость советского общества (People's Teacher of the USSR – Pride of Soviet society). Symbols and inscriptions are embossed, with convex letters. The medal was suspended to a single red silk fringe (18 mm x 21 mm) which was attached to the suit by a needle.

== See also ==
- Awards and decorations of the Soviet Union
- People's Artist of the Soviet Union
- People's Architect of the Soviet Union
- People's Doctor of the Soviet Union

== Bibliography ==
- Kolesnikov, G.A.; Rozhkov, A.M. (1986). Ордена и медали СССР (in Russian). Народная асвета.
