= People's Doctor of the USSR =

Award

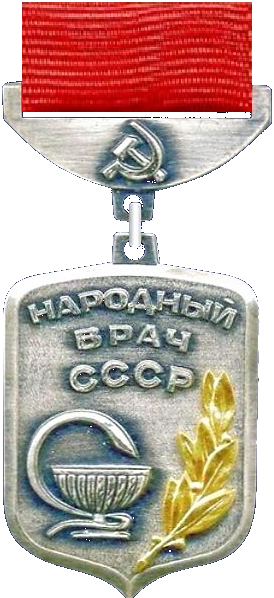
People's Doctor of the USSR insignia

People's Doctor of the USSR (Russian: Народный врач СССР) was an honorary title granted to doctors of the Soviet Union; it was established on 25 October 1977 by Leonid Brezhnev and its creation was officialised on the n°44/1977 issue of Supreme Soviet's official journal. Its regulation was later modified and completed by the Supreme Soviet's decree of 22 August 1988.

It was conferred by the Supreme Soviet's presidency on behalf of the Ministry of Health. A diploma of the Supreme Soviet's presidency was given to those who were appointed People's Doctor jointly with the medal and its concerning certificate. The title could be bestowed to individual medical doctors and nurses but also to health care structures as general hospitals, sanatoriums, maternity wards or preventive medicine centres. The awarded people or structures were selected for their worthwhile contributions to public health improvement, for their peculiar skills and expertise and for having proved abnegation and high moral qualities in their duties fulfilment.

Following the Dissolution of the Soviet Union in 1991, the title did not disappear. On 30 December 1995, by a decree of the Russian presidency, it was created the new title of Meritorious Doctor of the Russian Federation.

== Design ==
The medal was made of tombac and its shape was roughly quadrangular (22.5 x 23.5 mm). The central part was occupied by the inscription "Народный врач СССР" (People's Doctor of the USSR) on three lines and below, on the left, the Bowl of Hygieia medical symbol and, on the right, a bay laurel branch. Symbols and inscriptions were embossed, with convex letters. The medal was suspended to a single red silk fringe (18 mm x 21 mm) to whom it was attached by a metallic buckle bearing the hammer and sickle symbol.

== See also ==
- Awards and decorations of the Soviet Union
- People's Artist of the USSR
- People's Architect of the USSR
- People's Teacher of the USSR
- List of medicine awards
