= Armenians in Moldova =

Total population
- 1,000–3,000

Regions with significant populations
- Chișinău, Tiraspol

Languages
- Armenian, Romanian, Russian

Religion
- Armenian Apostolic Church

Related ethnic groups
- Nagorno-Karabakh Republic, Armenians in Romania, Armenians in Russia, Armenians in Turkey, Armenians in Ukraine.

Armenians in Moldova are the ethnic Armenians that live in Moldova. They settled in the Principality of Moldavia since the Late Middle Ages, and were well known as a merchant community. They prospered, and built a number of Armenian churches. Since the 18th century, however, their numbers decreased due to assimilation and emigration to other countries. During Soviet occupation, the number of Armenians increased a little, both during the 1950s-1980s, and when new immigrants came from Armenia, Azerbaijan during First Nagorno-Karabakh War in late 1980s. But after the fall of the Soviet Union, it decreased again.

== Population ==
At the 1930 Romanian Census, there were 1,511 Armenians in the nine counties of Bessarabia, including 583 in Lăpuşna County (490 in the city of Chişinău, 66 in the city of Hînceşti), 407 in Cetatea Albă County (366 in the city of Cetatea Albă), 242 in Bălți County (158 in the city of Bălţi), 73 in Ismail County (40 in the city of Izmail), 60 in Soroca County (14 in the city of Soroca), 58 in Tighina County (46 in the city of Tighina), 42 in Orhei County, 38 in Cahul County (22 in the city of Cahul), and 8 in Hotin County.

According to estimates, in the Soviet era, the Armenian community of Moldova was 5,000 strong.

At the 2004 Moldovan Census, Armenians were not among the 8 major reported ethnic groups, hence they numbered less than 2,000 in the territory controlled by the central government. In the Tiraspol-controlled areas, there were 980 Armenians, including 785 in Transnistria (360 in the city of Tiraspol), and 195 in other localities under Tiraspol control (173 in the city of Tighina). In the main part of Moldova, Armenians live mostly in the capital Chişinău, and a small community in Bălţi.

== History ==
=== Bessarabia ===
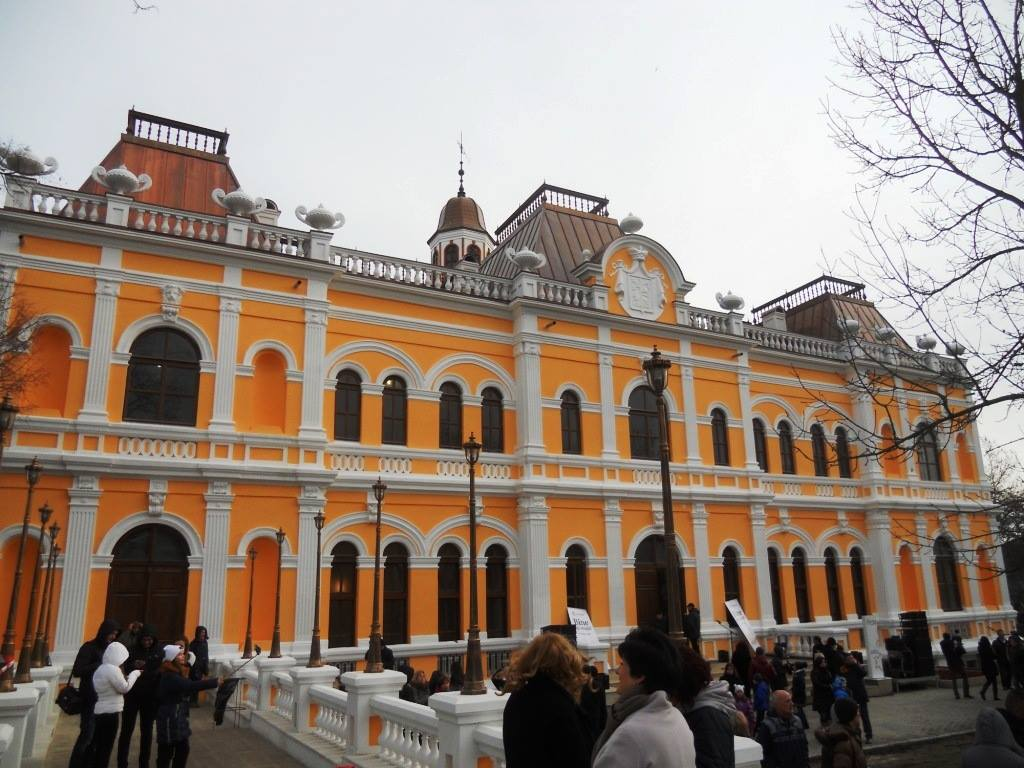
Manuc Bei's Mansion in Hîncești

The first Armenians in Moldova arrived in 14th century from Little Armenia in Cilicia, when their Kingdom with capital in Sis felt in 1375 to the Muslims, and Armenians spread through the Mediterranean Basin. Some of them arrived in the Principality of Moldavia, and from there some made to the Kingdom of Poland. As well-acquainted with the commerce between Europe and Levant, Armenians were successful in Moldavia, and already during the reign of Alexander the Good had established themselves as a community. At one time they were persecuted due to competition they made to Moldavian merchants. However, Moldavians were always tolerant to their Christian, albeit separate Church. Most of Armenians settled in fairs, as merchants, and some in villages as renters. They were well known for preserving their traditions and church.

According to ancient Armenian historical documents, Armenian churches were built as early as 1350 in Botoşani, in 1380 in Cetatea Albă, in 1395 in Huşi, and a number of others in 1551. Later, in the 17th century, more Armenians moved and settled in Moldova from Poland to escape the Catholic domination of their church.

After their number has decreased very much over time, in the early 20th century, there were only 2,000 Armenians in Bessarabia. In 1930, there were 1,511. Nowadays, there are less than 2,000 Armenians in Moldova, mostly in Chişinău, Bălţi, and Tighina (173).

=== Transnistria ===
In the 18th century, Raszków (now Rașcov) was the location of one of the Armenian communes in Poland.

When the Russian Empire annexed present southern Transnistria in 1792, Empress Catherine II of Russia ordered building a city on the eastern bank of the Dniester river, named by royal decree Grigoriopol. Some believe it was so named after Grigory Potyomkin, other that it was named after Gregory the Illuminator (Sourb Grigor Lousavoritch), the patron saint of the Armenian nation. Armenian settlers were brought in to found and build this city. Later, Armenians moved on to more prosperous regions, such as the capital city Chişinău, and the city of Odesa in neighboring Ukraine, amongst others.

Today, only 62 Armenians remain in the Grigoriopol sub-district, Transnistria, but its history is still strongly linked to the region's early Armenian settlers. Today there are 785 Armenians in Transnistria, including 360 in Tiraspol.

== See also ==
- Armenia–Moldova relations
- Armenian diaspora
- Ethnic groups in Moldova
- Armenians in Romania
- Armenians in Ukraine
