= Pyotr Z. Bazhbeuk-Melikov =

Bessarabian Armenian agronomist and politician (1872–1944)

Pyotr Zakharovich Bazhbeuk-Melikov
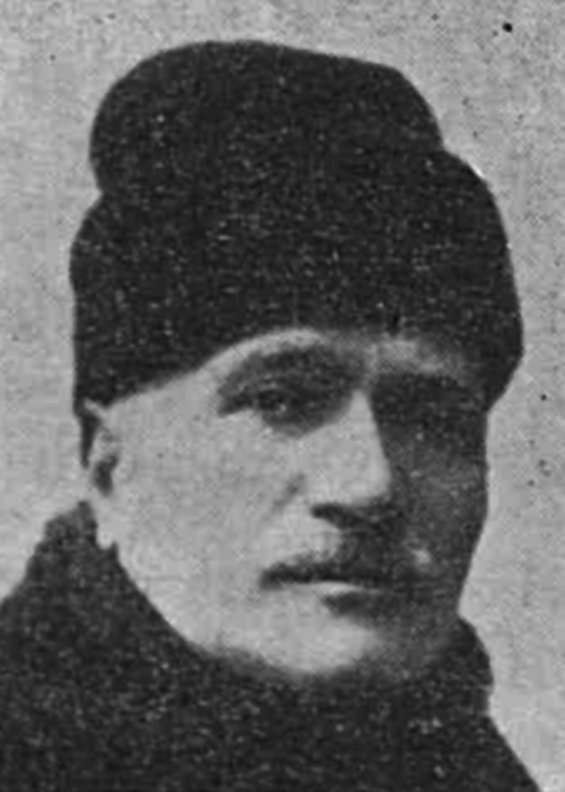
- Bazhbeuk-Melikov c. 1939

Member of Sfatul Țării
- In office December 8, 1917 – November 1918
- Constituency: Armenian caucus

Mayor of Orhei
- In office February 18 – December 14, 1933
- Preceded by: Collective leadership
- Succeeded by: Constantin Plăcintă

Personal details
- Born: Bedros Bažbeuk-Melikyan; February 27, 1872 Bender (Tighina), Bessarabia Governorate, Russian Empire
- Died: September 27, 1944 (aged 72) Ploiești, Kingdom of Romania
- Party: Constitutional Democratic Party; National Committee of Armenians from Bessarabia; National Peasants' Party; National Renaissance Front
- Profession: Agricultural engineer, estate administrator

Pyotr Zakharovich Bazhbeuk-Melikov, also Bachbeouk-Melikoff, Bazhbeuk-Melikyan or Bazhbeuk-Melikishvili (Armenian: Պետրոս Բաժբեուկ-Մելիքյան, Bedros Bažbeuk-Melikyan; Russian: Пётр Захарович Бажбеук-Меликов; Romanian: Petre Bajbeuc-Melikov, Bajbeug-Melicov, Bajbeuc-Melichian, or Basbeuc-Melikisvilli; February 27, 1872 – September 27, 1944), was an ethnic Armenian politician and agronomist in Bessarabia. Educated in Tiflis Governorate and then in France, he had various administrative offices in the Russian Empire and the Russian Republic. He presented himself in the November 1917 election for the Russian Constituent Assembly as an affiliate of the Constitutional Democratic Party. Failing in this bid, Bazhbeuk was instead welcomed as an Armenian delegate by the Bessarabian assembly, or Sfatul Țării, just before the proclamation of a Moldavian Democratic Republic. Loyal toward the latter, he spoke out against Bolshevik infiltration, and asked for an intervention by the neighboring Kingdom of Romania. Though he welcomed the Romanian military expedition of early 1918, he found himself opposed to the subsequent union between Bessarabia and Romania, reverting to Russian monarchism.

In 1919, Bazhbeuk joined the Odessa-based Committee for the Salvation of Bessarabia, and, through it, also the White movement. The Committee sent him on a mission to the General Command of the Armed Forces of South Russia in Rostov-on-Don, where he spoke about reintegrating Bessarabia with a future Russian state. Fleeing the region altogether during the later stages of the Russian Civil War, Bazhbeuk publicized the White émigré cause in the Kingdom of Bulgaria, but finally returned to Bessarabia and served Romania's monarchy. He joined the National Peasants' Party in the early 1930s, chaired a local agricultural chamber, and was the Mayor of Orhei for a few months in 1933. Again escaping Bessarabia following the Soviet occupation of 1940, he settled deeper in Romania, dying four years later in Ploiești.

== Biography ==
=== Career and political debut ===
Though described by researcher Simion Tavitian as an immigrant from the Caucasus, Bazhbeuk was in fact born to Armenian parents in Bender (Tighina), Bessarabia Governorate. Scholars Ion Gumenâi and Lidia Prisac argue that the Bazhbeuks were a wealthy family: though Pyotr Zakharovich never acknowledged that he was a landowner, he probably held to his name townhouses in both Orhei and Chișinău. Likewise, historian Ion Țurcanu describes Bazhbeuk as a "petty landowner". Pyotr completed his secondary education at the Classical Gymnasium in Tiflis (Tbilisi), then took university studies in France—successively at the Commercial School of Écully, the Catholic University of Lyon, and the Montpellier School of Agriculture, where he took a degree in agricultural engineering. He was thereafter charged with opening model farms on the Russian Crown Estates. During the February Revolution of 1917, when he was recruited by the Russian Provisional Government as its representative for Orgeyevsky Uyezd, Bazhbeuk was also leader of Orhei's local government body, the Zemstvo.

Bazhbeuk ran in the legislative election of November 1917, seventh on a Constitutional Democratic or "People's Party" list headlined by the Prince Urusov. On December 8, he was sent to Sfatul Țării, the regional assembly of Bessarabia, as the first and sole Armenian representative. His comparatively late appointment was due to the belated formation of a National Committee of Armenians from Bessarabia (NAKOBA), under Mitridat Muratov; he was probably proposed to NAKOBA by a Romanian landowner, Vladimir Herța. Days after Bazhbeuk's induction by Sfatul, the legislature voted to organize Bessarabia into an autonomous "Moldavian Democratic Republic" (RDM). Upon being sworn in, Bazhbeuk gave a speech outlining his support for the RDM, his loyalty to the Armenian national liberation movement, and also his enduring commitment to the Russian Constituent Assembly. Additionally, he declared that the Armenians would help to defend RDM territory against devastation by Rumcherod soldiers and the spread of Bolshevik influence.

Bazhbeuk was one of a "handful" of Sfatul people who could be considered wealthy—on par with Vladimir Bodescu, Vladimir Cristi, Nadejda Grinfeld, Eugen Kenigschatz, and a few others; the vast majority of delegates were peasants or low-income professionals, dependent on their state salaries which ran at no more than 600 Kerenkas per month. Bazhbeuk's standing as a "bourgeois" figure was one of the issues which antagonized far-left deputies. In a Sfatul session of December 28, Ioan Panțâr tried but failed to obtain Bazhbeuk's removal; the session finally ended with a group of leftists boycotting Sfatul meetings. During the proceedings, Bazhbeuk insisted that Bolshevik revolts be put down at any cost, and even asked for the Romanian Army to occupy Bessarabia—though he considered this a provisional solution to a temporary problem. Soon after, the RDM was subject to a Romanian military intervention. Bazhbeuk attended a banquet at the Assembly of the Nobility in Chișinău, delivering a welcome speech, in French, for the Romanian commander Ernest Broșteanu; as a Zemstvo delegate, he greeted Romanian troops outside Bălți. He also found common ground with the National Moldavian Party (PNM), which mainly embodied Romanian nationalism. His reported home at 81 Viilor Street served as a meeting spot for activists of the "Moldavian Bloc", which reunited the PNM and its various partners.

In one Sfatul session of March 1917, Bazhbeuk condemned the Ukrainian People's Republic for its promise to annex Bessarabia, and criticized the RDM Directorate for its "unlawful" lassitude on the issue, and for not sending representatives to the Bucharest peace conference. He was joined in this by other members of the non-Romanian communities, including Samuel Lichtmann, Krste Misirkov, and Arkadi Osmolovski. Their interventions annoyed the President of the Council of Directors, Daniel Ciugureanu, who reminded the speakers of their ethnic status:

Deputy Bajbeuc-Melicov, whose opinion I hold in the highest regard, describes [our] actions [...] as criminal lassitude. This is a serious accusation and I wish to make it clear that Deputy Bajbeuc-Melicov does not have a point. I do not doubt that he suffers for this country, for its misfortunes, nor that he speaks with anything but the utmost sincerity. But I myself love my country no less than you gentlemen who represent the national minorities. What are you, after all? You are guests, guests who receive shelter and hospitality in this country.

=== White spokesman ===
From early April, as Bessarabia embarked on a conditional union with Romania which preserved some of its autonomy, Bazhbeuk, who was registered as absent during the actual vote, greatly reduced his participation in Sfatul sessions—he was present only three times before November 1918. Instead, he was integrated as a civil servant on the legislative committee which decided on the RDM's official languages (February 1918), also appearing on boards for financial regulation and land reform (March–May 1918). In May 1918, he was also appointed to Vladimir Tsyganko's commission on land reform, but did not attend its inaugural session. He was finally removed, and replaced with Guttman Landau, after failing to show up for five consecutive sessions. Gumenâi and Prisac argue that he took the time to reflect on his political stances. Increasingly aware that Broșteanu had no orders to vacate Bessarabia, he came to reconsider his "apparent loyalty" toward Romania.

By early 1919, Bazhbeuk had left Romania and was in Odessa, a port city that was then under direct administration by the Allied powers; a Russian loyalist, he had joined A. N. Krupensky and Alexandr K. Schmidt's Committee for the Salvation of Bessarabia. Still counting himself a Zemstvo representative, in February 1919 he contributed to a memorandum received by the foreign consulates in Odessa. It referred to Romania as an "Asian" country whose intervention had degraded the former RDM, describing the actions of Broșteanu and others as "horror" and "vandalism". Before September, Bazhbeuk and V. I. Yaroshevich were delegated by the Committee to the All-Russian National Center, formed by the White movement (and more specifically the VSYuR) in Rostov-on-Don. Though they were both admitted on the body, it was not as official representatives of Bessarabia, since the VSYuR's Anton Denikin had no intention of antagonizing Romania. In his Rostov appearances, Bazhbeuk described "Greater Romania" as concocted by Sfatul against the wishes of its electorate. Overall, however, he agreed with Denikin that no plebiscite was to be held regarding the rejoining of Bessarabia to a reconstructed Russia.

As Bolshevist Russia recovered to win the Civil War, Bazhbeuk withdrew into exile. In 1925, he published in Sofia, Kingdom of Bulgaria the Russian monarchist tract Сборник Высочайших актов и исторических материалов ("Collection of Imperial Acts and Historical Materials"). It documented the execution of the Romanov family, presenting Bazhbeuk's own allegiance to Grand Duke Kirill as the "Emperor of Russia". The author eventually reconciled with the Romanian government, and returned to Bessarabia. In later years, Bazhbeuk was recovered as an agriculturalist by the Romanian Crown Estate in Orhei County, and served terms as president, and chief agronomist, of the agricultural chamber (a consultative body of experts and landowners, formed in succession to the Zemstvo) in that same district. In this capacity, he published a number of scientific works detailing agricultural and geographic issues. From 1931, he was a staff writer for the agriculturalist monthly Buletinul Agricol din Basarabia.

=== PNȚ recruitment and later life ===
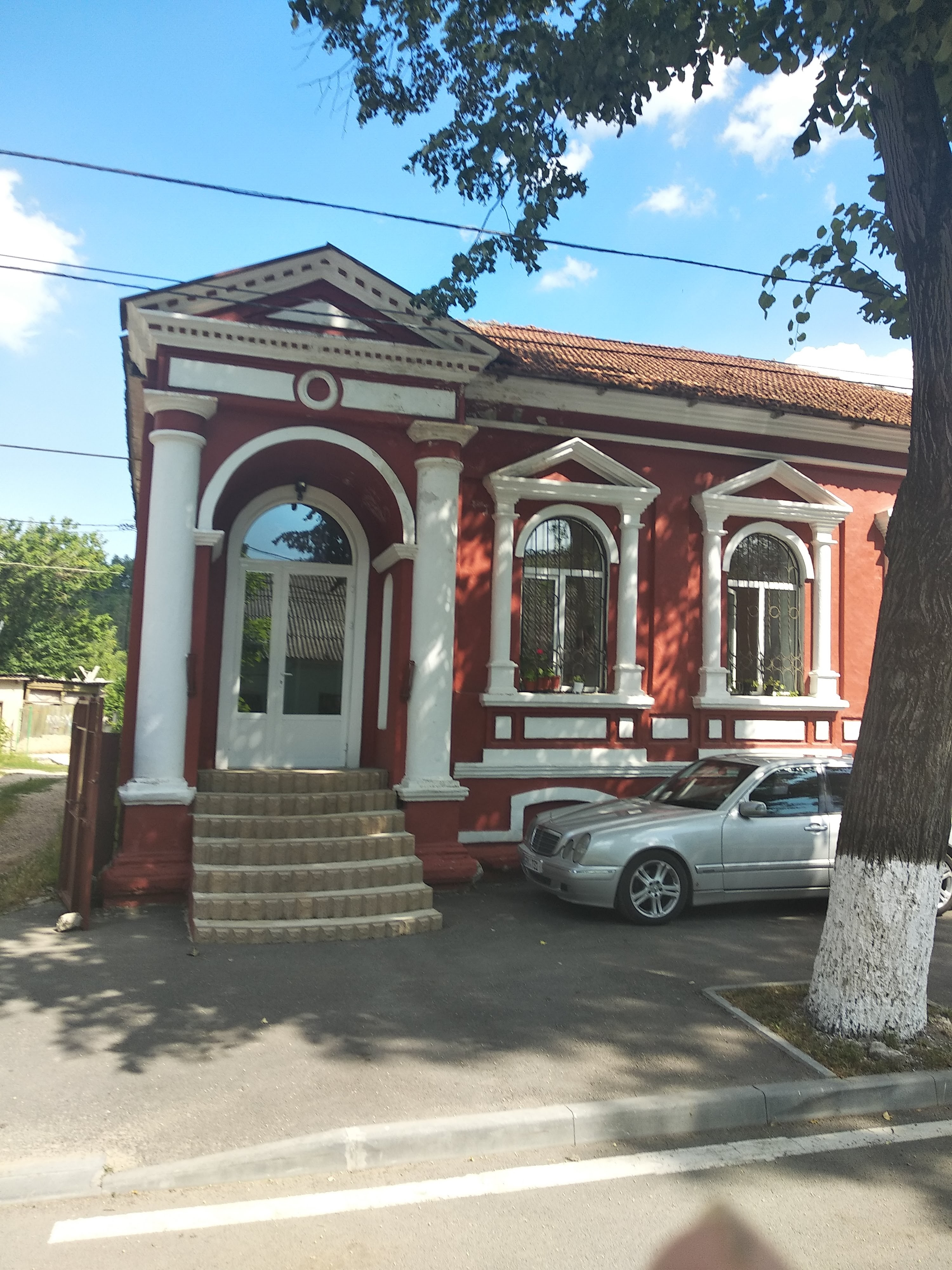
Orhei's former town hall

Before the general election of June 1931, Bazhbeuk-Melikov had joined the country-wide National Peasants' Party (PNȚ), and was campaigning for its candidates in Orhei County. A report in the PNȚ daily Dreptatea claims that he and his party colleague Ion Pelivan were prevented from speaking at a rally in Bravicea by the local Gendarmes, in defiance of the electoral laws. He and Ion N. Jivallo were put up as Orhei candidates for the Romanian Senate, but only took 1,280 votes between them, out of 17,276 cast—the seats were taken by National Union candidates, including General Nicolae Alevra. On September 6, Bazhbeuk attended the Congress of Co-operative Aviculture, convened by Vasile Ghenzul. Here, he argued that Bessarabia's poultry could only be improved by reforming and implicating the agricultural chambers. In November, the national cabinet formed by the National Liberal Party (PNL) allowed Bessarabian notables to provide input on its economic policies, with a Bessarabian Economic Council that was chaired by General Ioan Rășcanu, the Minister for Bessarabia. Bazhbeuk was inducted on this body, wherein he represented the agricultural chamber.

In August 1932, after recall elections and a PNȚ sweep, the new administration deposed the Mayor of Orhei and created a provisional commission, comprising Bazhbeuk-Melikov as chairman, with Nuhim (or Naum) Rozenblit, Trofim Bacal, Mordco Man, Al. Ciobanu and Iosif Ștraveț as the other members. In December, he attended in Chișinău the Bessarabian agronomists' congress, where he was one of the speakers asking that the agricultural chambers be preserved under the new regime. Only the PNȚ put up candidates for the agricultural chamber election of January 1933, with Nicolae Checerul Cuș and Mihail Minciună being elected as president and vice president, respectively; Bazhbeuk was voted in on the permanent delegation. On February 18, 1933, the Ministry of Internal Affairs appointed Bazhbeuk as Mayor of Orhei, with Rozenblit as his aide. During his tenure, he advanced projects for an aqueduct and a public bathhouse, and initiated a search for financing; according to Tavitian, he was "beloved by the entire [city] population."

Bazhbeuk resigned on December 14, to be replaced by the Constantin Plăcintă. His decision was prompted by a PNL victory in the concurrent legislative election. Bazhbeuk's other activity, at the agricultural chamber, saw him being appointed to a labor court for the Orhei wine-making industry—as assistant judge to Alexandru Polansky—on September 1, 1933. The PNL moved to disestablish all such chambers in April 1934, prompting the former Minister of Agriculture, Virgil Potârcă, to filibuster on the issue in the Assembly of Deputies. With this intervention, Potârcă noted that the Zemstvo and the chamber of agriculture in Orhei had been highly successful, but that the Romanian government, unlike its Russian predecessor, had been predatory, returning as investments only 2 or 3% of what it collected as taxes. To highlight the point that nothing else had changed since the "Russian times", he argued: "It says here that they even have the same agronomist, a certain Melicov."

In October 1934, Bazhbeuk became one of three PNȚ vice presidents for Orhei County, also joining the disciplinary committee. After by-elections in March 1935, the former mayor was reconfirmed to Orhei's city council. As the eldest member, he served as inaugural session president (March 22), announcing that the PNȚ would form the "loyal opposition" to Mayor Plăcintă, who was reconfirmed by a PNL majority. In August 1936, he was rewarded by government with a lifetime membership in the chamber of agriculture; he had involved himself in the soybean trade. He and his associate, Vâhovschi, created Soia company—which, according to one hostile piece in Gazeta Basarabiei, reported 2,000 hectares in its possession, when in fact it only held 600.

The Orhei round of the local elections in mid-1937 saw Bazhbeuk on the campaign trail alongside Gheorghe Panișca, making stops in places such as Onișcani and Meleșeni. At such rallies, he decried actions by the far-right National Christian Party, noting that its "unhinged" and "criminal propaganda" was in fact communist in nature. He presented himself for a Senate seat in the December election, also at Orhei, running alongside PNȚ colleague Mihai Drăgan. They only won 1,680 votes, with the two seats taken by National Liberals Mișu Marinescu and Pavel Guciujna (with 8,691 votes between them); the National Christians had outperformed the PNȚ, taking second-place. In January 1939, with the PNȚ formally outlawed, Bazhbeuk joined Romania's sole legal party, the National Renaissance Front. The following year, he was again chased out of Bessarabia by the Soviet occupation, and was for a while reported as missing by his wife Vera, who had settled in Bucharest. He died on September 27, 1944, "after a short and terrible suffering", in Ploiești, being buried in that city's Bolovan Cemetery. A one-year memorial service was held at the Bucharest Armenian Church.
