= Guttman Landau =

Bessarabian Jewish leader

President of the Judenrat in Chișinău
- In office August 1, 1941 – March 30, 1942
- Preceded by: none
- Succeeded by: none (Ghetto liquidated)

Member of Sfatul Țării
- In office c. December 1917 – c. August 1918

Personal details
- Born: Toby-Gutman Samuilovich Lando; Товий-Гутман Самуилович Ландо; 1877 or 1878 Russian Empire
- Died: May 21, 1942 (aged 63–65) Chișinău, Bessarabia Governorate, Kingdom of Romania
- Spouse: Sara Landau
- Profession: Social activist, businessman, merchant

Guttman Shmuel Landau (Russian: Товий-Гутман Самуилович Ландо, Toby-Gutman Samuilovich Lando, also known as Guttman Lando or Gutman Landau; 1877 or 1878 – May 21, 1942) was a leader of the Bessarabian Jewish community, active in the Moldavian Democratic Republic and Romania. His social work was tied to the city of Chișinău, where he was also a civil servant and merchant. A member of the Moldavian Republic's legislature (Sfatul Țării) in 1918, he returned to prominence during World War II, designated by the antisemitic regime of Ion Antonescu as President of the Chișinău Judenrat, effectively answering for the Chișinău Ghetto. He was unable to prevent his constituents' deportation and indiscriminate killing in Transnistria Governorate, but was spared their fate until May 20, 1942. He committed suicide the following day; his wife attempted the same, but was rescued and survived the war.

== Biography ==
=== Sfatul period and interwar ===
Landau was originally active in Bessarabia Governorate, a province of the Russian Empire to 1917. In September 1917, just ahead of the October Revolution, he served with Nicolae Alexandri, P. M. Morgulis, and V. G. Globa on commission overseeing the Russian parliamentary election at Chișinău (Kishinev). He became politically prominent in 1918, when Bessarabia refounded itself as the quasi-independent "Moldavian Democratic Republic", with Chișinău as its capital. Aged 40 at the time, Landau was integrated into the Republic's civil service, while also taking a seat in the Sfatul Țării legislature. However, he was absent from the Sfatul during the debates of April 9 [O.S. March 27], 1918, at the end of which Bessarabia united with Romania.

Subsequently, Landau participated in the Jewish and Gentile life of Greater Romania. On May 16, 1918, Sfatul appointed him to a commission tasked with overseeing land reform. As a representative of the ethnic-minorities bloc, he was replacing the Armenian Pyotr Z. Bazhbeuk-Melikov, who had failed to attend any of the commission's five previous sessions; Landau was finally made a full member on May 26, on Vladimir Tsyganko's proposal. He was initially active during the debates. On June 21, he added a correction to the proposed law on land reform, replacing reference to the "local population" as beneficiaries of the reform with "population of Bessarabia". Historian Ion Țurcanu argues that Landau's "ably camouflaged" goal was to prevent future legislators from reading the paragraph as barring property ownership by non-Romanians. Together with Philipp Almendinger, and against Ion Buzdugan, he supported the notion of having decisions vetted by agronomists—more specifically, they asked that any existing model farms be exempt from land redistribution.

Landau ended his participation on the Sfatul commission in July 1918—according to Țurcanu, as a "Jew with no agricultural business of his own", he ultimately had no stake in observing its work. On July 24, Tsyganko, as the commission president, noted that he had absented for six consecutive sessions, and had him stripped of his membership; Vladimir Chiorescu replaced Landau on August 2. After the Bessarabian–Romanian unification had been effected, Landau participated in the life of the larger Jewish Romanian community: in December 1922, he attended a rabbinical conference convened by Jacob Itzhak Niemirower in Bucharest. He was involved with the Zionist groups in Bessarabia, serving as both shareholder and auditor for the Jewish Emigration Bank, established in April 1924. Ilya Ehrenburg and Vasily Grossman also note that he was a "popular social activist".

Landau presented himself in the May 1926 election for the Romanian Assembly of Deputies, as sixth on an independents' list for Lăpușna County, headlined by Toma Ciorbă; the list only took 351 votes, or 0.83% of the total in that precinct. A shopkeeper in Chișinău by 1929, he also served on the board of Cultura și Munca ("Culture and Labor", the kehilla), under Yehuda Leib Tsirelson. In September 1938, when he was registered with the phone company, his address was given as Mărăști Street 6. By 1939, he had branched out in the grain trade, and was operating a warehouse at Principele Nicolae Street 15–17. In March 1936, during the trial of Petre Constantinescu-Iași and his group of anti-fascists (charged by the authorities with having put up a front for the illegal Communist Party), he appeared as a character reference for co-defendant Paulina Rosenberg. On December 11, 1938, Petre Andrei, as the Minister of Education and Religious Affairs, appointed Landau to take over as president of the Israelite Community, after his immediate predecessor, Solomon Șur, had been prosecuted as a confidence artist.

=== Holocaust era ===
In April 1940, almost a year into World War II, the Romanian Army staged a general mobilization in defense of the national borders. In that context, Landau represented Chișinău's Israelite Community on the city board for providing relief to the families of new recruits. In June 1940, the Soviet Union staged its occupation of Bessarabia. This was received as a shock in Romania, where an Axis-aligned regime took over, with Ion Antonescu at its helm. Over the following months, the regime, which inherited and enforced antisemitic laws passed in the late 1930s, constructed a conspiracy theory, blaming Jews for the Soviet occupation and for alleged acts of terror. The allegations were immediately disproved by community leaders such as Horia Carp and Wilhelm Filderman, but, as historian Dennis Deletant writes, "these details [...] had little impact on the officers and men of the Romanian army of 1940. The whole anti-Semitic argument rested on a total denial of these facts." According to Landau's later testimony, some of his fellow Chișinău Jews, possibly including members of his own family, were actually deported to the Gulag under Soviet rule.

On June 22, 1941, Romania joined in Germany's surprise attack on the Soviet Union, and retook Bessarabia. The Jews of Chișinău were trapped under a military occupation, and had to move into a Ghetto, delineated in the late days of July. On August 1 the Ghetto Committee was created by the Romanians. It had Landau as its president, with Avraham Șapira and E. Bittman assisting him, and 19 other intellectuals serving as regular members. Landau personally obtained that he be allowed to open a bakery and a hospital (the latter of which was staffed by the Army), and negotiated the conditions of forced labor by the Jewish captives. The situation soon deteriorated, with food becoming scarce and some 15 or 30 people dying each day within the Ghetto. The hospital was also dismantled, with the Army taking back its donations for reasons of "military expediency". By August, Jewish labor squadrons were randomly murdered by the soldiers. In one such incident, Captain Radu Ionescu ordered his machine-gun company to fire into a crowd of Jewish workers.

On October 8, the authorities began carrying out a plan for the mass deportation of Chișinău Jews into Transnistria Governorate, where other Jews were already being massacred or left to die (see Holocaust in Romania). With the other Ghetto leaders, Landau addressed an appeal to Constantin Vasiliu, the Gendarmerie commander, attesting that his community was loyal to Romania, and had suffered under Soviet rule, while noting that the mass of the designated deportees were frail people. The letter's minimal request was a postponement of the transports to spring, when the Jews could "more easily adapt" to a new home. As noted by historian Paul A. Shapiro, Landau and the others most likely knew that "death of the deportees" was the desired outcome of Vasiliu's project: "Their appeal for postponement would have made no sense, however, if they had betrayed awareness".

The appeal was bluntly rejected by Vasiliu, while Șapira tried in vain to obtain a postponement from Antonescu himself. On October 7, as panic engulfed the Ghetto, Landau also addressed a telegram to Antonescu, asking him "very submissively" to "grant pity on [the Chișinău Jews]". Nevertheless, deportations continued at a steady pace. According to Landau's wife Sara, eighteen of her own relatives were deported on the last train from Chișinău, and did not survive deportation, being either shot or dying from typhus. Her husband was intensely petitioned by relatives of the deportees, answering them that he knew nothing "about where they were sent". On October 22, Antonescu gave an order excepting baptized Jews and former Sfatul deputies from being deported—thereby allowing the Landaus to remain in Chișinău. In January 1942, Antonescu's aide Constantin Z. Vasiliu gave his approval that a five-man Jewish committee, including Landau and Fred Șaraga, be allowed to visit Transnistria and "provide assistance to the Jewish deportees"; the order was later rephrased, allowing only two delegates.

The Romanian regime revoked the order to spare the excepted categories on March 30, 1942, when Antonescu instigated the "cleansing of the terrain". This meant the deportation of the 425 Jews remaining in Bessarabia (257 of whom were in the Ghetto, including paraplegics and mental patients). Despite having saved 23,800 lei for bribes, the Landaus could not buy protection. On May 20, as the order came for their evacuation, they decided to commit suicide together by morphine overdose. A search party team found the couple still breathing, sending them to hospital. Sara was rescued and, interned, narrowly avoided deportation; Guttman died in intensive care, on the morning of May 21. His death remains one of many forced suicide cases in the closing Ghetto—9 others are mentioned by name in Ehrenburg and Grossman's book. Sara Landau's presence was tolerated in Chișinău for the next year, as the orders for deportation were no longer enforced, and, in mid-1943, were altogether rescinded. Following the resumption of Soviet control in 1944, she gave testimony on the Ghetto's plight and the deaths in her own family to Soviet investigators.
