= Soroca County (Romania) =

Coordinates: 48°10′N 28°15′E

Județul Soroca
- County (Județ)
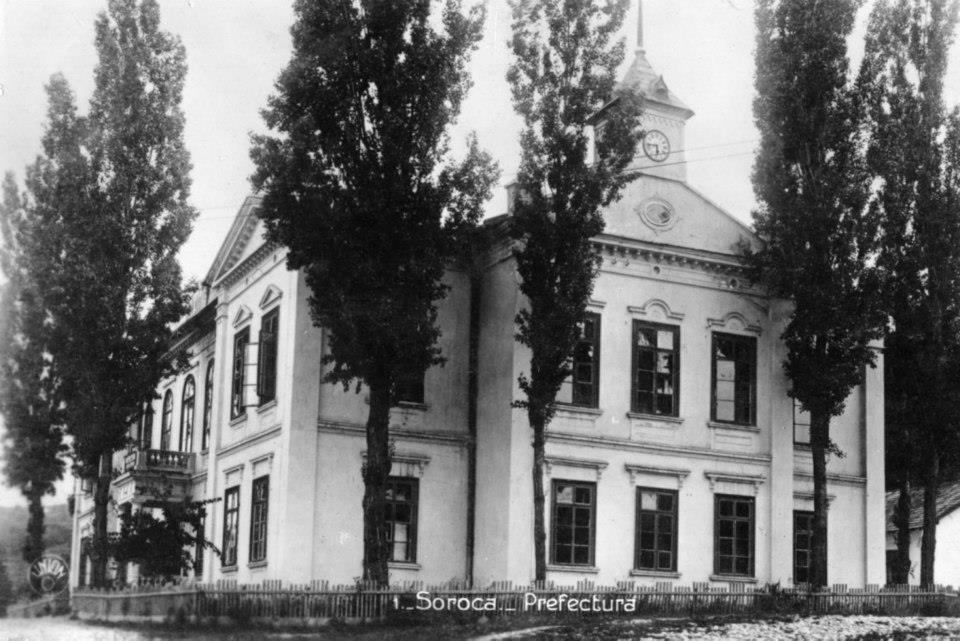
- Soroca County Prefecture building from the interwar period.

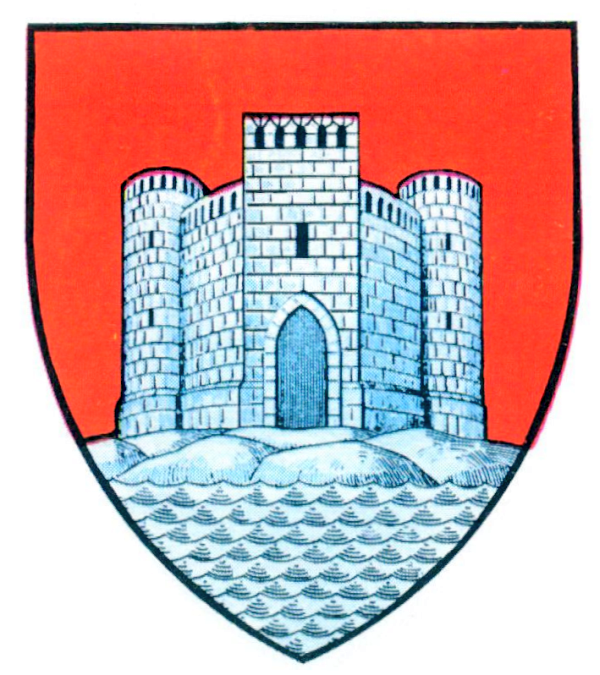
- Coat of arms

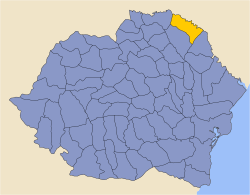
- Country: Romania
- Historic region: Bessarabia
- Capital city (Reședință de județ): Soroca
- Established: 1925 (first time); 1941 (second time)
- Ceased to exist: 1938 (first time); 1944 (second time)

Area
  - Total: 4,331 km^{2} (1,672 sq mi)

Population (1930)
  - Total: 315,774
  - Density: 72.91/km^{2} (188.8/sq mi)
- Time zone: UTC+2 (EET)
  - Summer (DST): UTC+3 (EEST)

Soroca County was a county (Romanian: județ) in the Kingdom of Romania between 1925 and 1938 and between 1941 and 1944. The seat was Soroca.

== Geography ==
The county was located in the northeastern part of Greater Romania, in the northeastern region of Bassarabia, on the border with the Soviet Union. Currently its territory is entirely in the Republic of Moldova. It was bordered to the northwest by Hotin County, to the west and southwest by Bălți County, southeast by Orhei County, and to the east and north-east with the USSR.

== History ==
After the Union of Bessarabia with Romania in 1918, the county belonged to Romania, which set up the county formally in 1925.

The first prefect of Soroca County was Vasile Săcară in 1918.

After the 1938 Administrative and Constitutional Reform, this county merged with the counties Bacău, Baia, Bălți, Botoșani, Iași, Neamț, Roman, and Vaslui to form Ținutul Prut.

The area of the county was occupied by the Soviet Union in 1940 and became part of the Moldavian SSR. The area returned to Romanian administration as the Bessarabia Governorate following the Axis invasion of the Soviet Union in July 1941. A military administration was established and the region's Jewish population was either executed on the spot or deported to Transnistria, where further numbers were killed. As the Soviet Union's offensive pushed the Axis powers back, the area again was under Soviet control. On September 12, 1944, Romania signed the Moscow Armistice with the Allies. The Armistice, as well as the subsequent peace treaty of 1947, confirmed the Soviet-Romanian border as it was on January 1, 1941. The area of the county, along with the rest of the Moldavian SSR, became part of the independent country of Moldova.

== Administrative Organization ==
In 1930, the county consisted of four administrative districts (plăși):

1. Plasa Bădiceni, headquartered at Bădiceni
2. Plasa Climăuți, headquartered at Climăuți
3. Plasa Cotiugenii-Mari, headquartered at Cotiugenii-Mari
4. Plasa Florești, headquartered at Florești

Later, the county was reorganized into eight districts:

1. Plasa Bădiceni, headquartered at Bădiceni
2. Plasa Cotiugenii-Mari, headquartered at Cotiugenii-Mari
3. Plasa Florești, headquartered at Florești
4. Plasa Nădușița, headquartered at Nădușița
5. Plasa Otaci, headquartered at Otaci
6. Plasa Soroca, headquartered at Soroca
7. Plasa Târnova, headquartered at Târnova
8. Plasa Vîrtejeni, headquartered at Vârtejeni

In 1941, the county was organized as follows:

1. City of Soroca
2. Plasa Climăuți, headquartered at Climăuți
3. Plasa Florești, headquartered at Florești
4. Plasa Nădușița, headquartered at Nădușița
5. Plasa Soroca, headquartered at Soroca

== Population ==
According to the census data of 1930, the county's population was 315,774, of which 73.4% were ethnic Romanians, 9.2% Jews, 8.6% Ukrainians, 8.3% Russians, as well as other minorities. From the religious point of view 88.6% of the population was Eastern Orthodox, as well as other minorities. The city of Soroca had a population of 14,661.

According to the census data of 1941, the county's population was 310.220, of which 84.57% were ethnic Romanians, 12.40% Ukrainians, 2.10% Russians, 0.41% Jews, 0.19% Poles, as well as other minorities.
