= Ținutul Nistru =

- Land (Ținut)
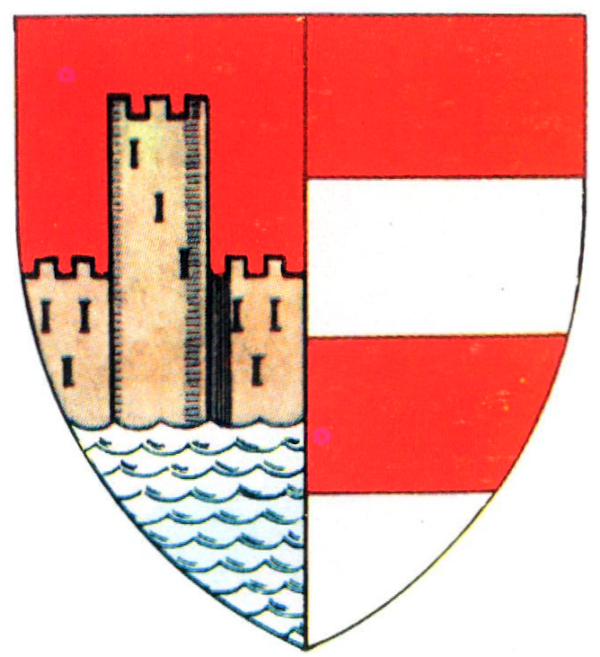
- Coat of arms

- Country: Romania
- Former counties included: Cetatea-Albă County, Lăpușna County, Orhei County, Tighina County
- Historic region: Moldavia (Bessarabia, Budjak)
- Capital city (Reședință de ținut): Chișinău
- Established: 14 August 1938
- Ceased to exist (de facto): 29 June 1940
- Ceased to exist (de jure): 22 Septembrie 1940

Government
  - Type: Rezident Regal
- Time zone: UTC+2 (EET)
  - Summer (DST): UTC+3 (EEST)

Ținutul Nistru was one of the ten ținuturi ("lands") of Romania, founded in 1938 after King Carol II, initiated an institutional reform by modifying the 1923 Constitution and the law of territorial administration. It comprised most of Bessarabia (including parts of the Budjak), and its name was derived from the Dniester River. Its capital was the city of Chișinău. Ținutul Nistru ceased to exist de facto following the territorial losses of Romania to the Soviet Union in June 1940, while all authorities moved to Iași until the de jure dissolution of the land, on 22 September 1940.

== Coat of arms ==
The Coat of Arms is party per pale. The dexter consists of a gules field bearing an argent castle (probably depicting the citadel of Cetatea Albă) over waves argent and azure (standing for either the Black Sea or the Dniester). The sinister field consists of four bars, two of gules and two of argent, the former four counties of Greater Romania (71 in total) which it included.

== Counties incorporated ==
After the 1938 Administrative and Constitutional Reform, of the older 71 counties Ținutul Nistru included 4:

- Cetatea-Albă County
- Lăpușna County
- Orhei County
- Tighina County

== See also ==
- Historical administrative divisions of Romania
- History of Moldova
- History of Romania
