= Hotin County =

Județul Hotin
- County (Județ)
- Coat of arms

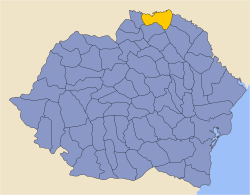
- Country: Romania
- Historic region: Bessarabia
- Capital city (Reședință de județ): Hotin
- Established: 1925 (first time); 1941 (second time)
- Ceased to exist: 1938 (first time); 1944 (second time)

Area
  - Total: 3,782 km^{2} (1,460 sq mi)

Population (1930)
  - Total: 395,345
  - Density: 104.5/km^{2} (270.7/sq mi)
- Time zone: UTC+2 (EET)
  - Summer (DST): UTC+3 (EEST)

Hotin County was a county (ținut is Middle Ages and Early Modern Period, județ after) in the Principality of Moldavia (14th-18th centuries), the Governorate of Bessarabia (1812–1917), the Moldavian Democratic Republic (1917–1918), and the Kingdom of Romania (1918–1940, 1941–1944).

Its capital was in the city of Hotin (today Khotyn). The territory of the county is currently divided between Ukraine (northern half) and Moldova (southern half).

== Geography ==

Between the two world wars, Hotin County covered 3,782 km^{2} and was located in the northeastern part of Greater Romania, being the northernmost County of Bessarabia. It was located on the border with the Soviet Union. In the interwar period, its borders were as follows: the Vinnytsia Oblast in the Ukrainian SSR of the Soviet Union to the north and north-east, the Stanislawow Voivodship of Poland to the north-west, Soroca County to the south-east, Bălți County to south, Dorohoi County to the south and south-west, and Cernăuți County to the west.

== Administrative organization ==
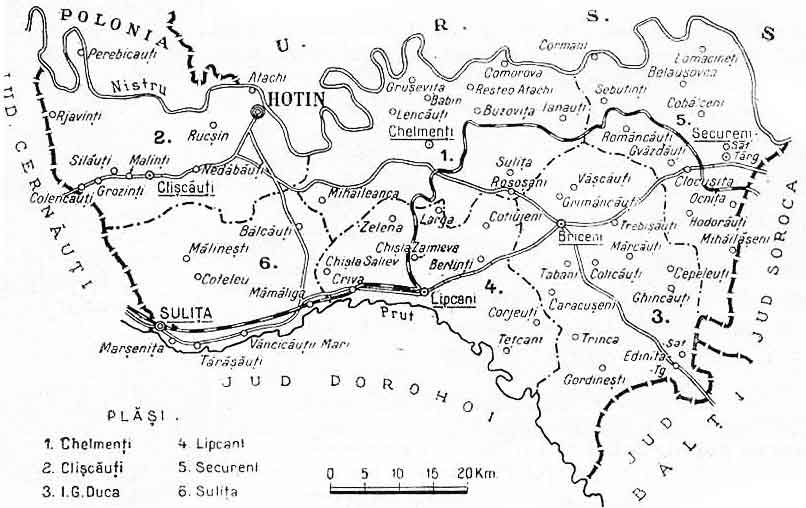
Map of Hotin County, as constituted in 1938.

Administratively, Hotin County was divided administratively into the city of Hotin and four (later six) districts (plăşi, singular plasă):

1. Plasa Briceni (or I.G. Duca)
2. Plasa Hotin (or Clișcăuți)
3. Plasa Lipcani
4. Plasa Secureni

Subsequently, two more districts were created:

1. Plasa Sulița (or B.P. Hașdeu)
2. Plasa Chelmenți (or Vadul lui Traian)

At the autumn 1941 census, the county was administrative divided as follows:

1. city of Hotin
2. city of Sulița
3. Plasa Cetatea Hotinului (or Clișcăuți), headquartered at Clișcăuți
4. Plasa Chelmenți (or Vadul lui Traian), headquartered at Chelmenți
5. Plasa Briceni, (or I.G. Duca) headquartered at Briceni
6. Plasa Lipcani, headquartered at Lipcani
7. Plasa Secureni, headquartered at Secureni
8. Plasa Sulița (or B.P. Hașdeu), headquartered at Sulița

== Population ==
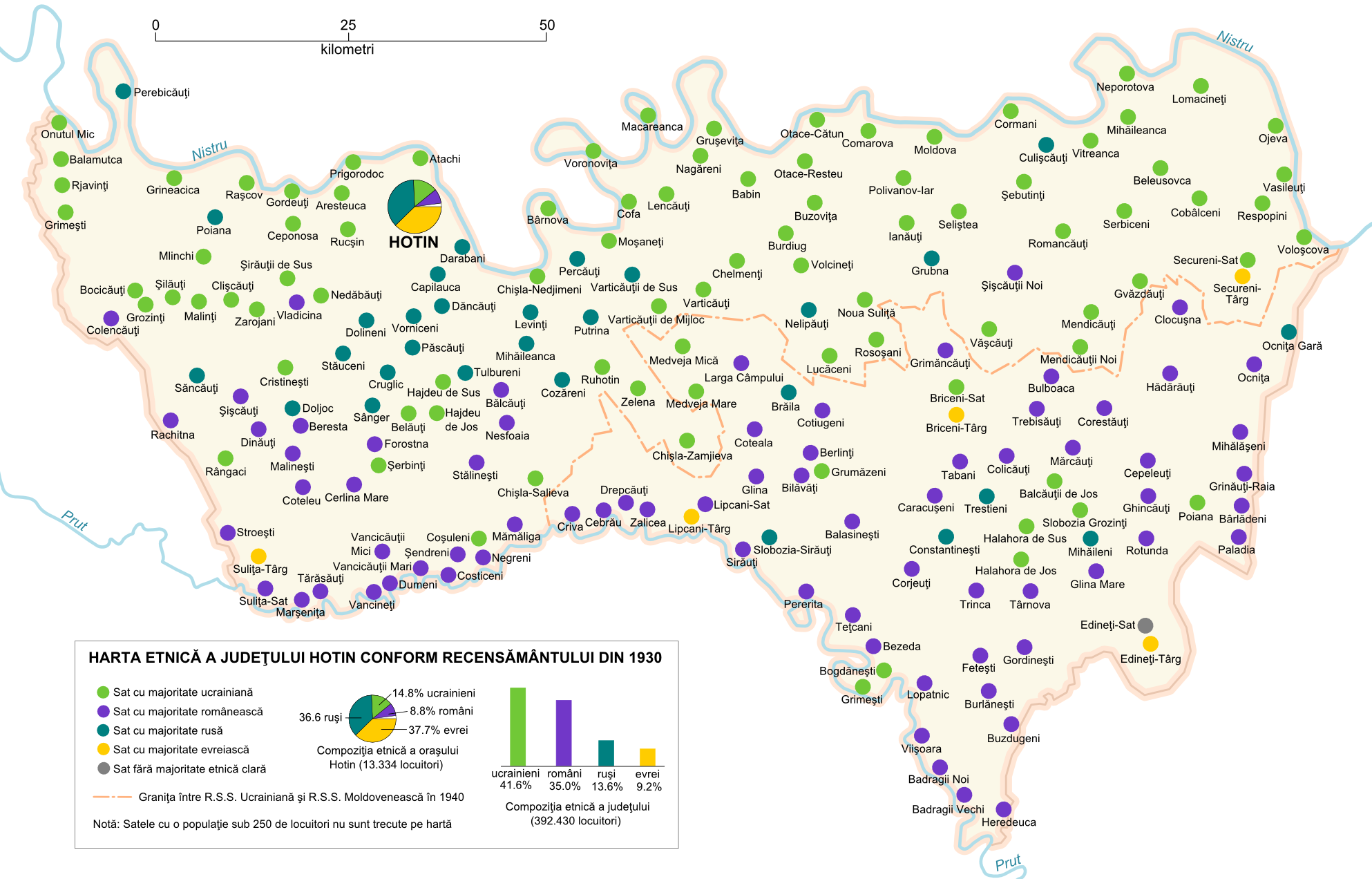
Ethnic map of Hotin County per the 1930 census.

According to the Romanian census of 1930 the population of Hotin County was 392,430, of which 41.6% were ethnic Ukrainians, 35.0% ethnic Romanians, 13.6% ethnic Russians, 9.2% Jews, 0.3% ethnic Poles. Classified by mother tongue: 45.1% spoke Ukrainian, 33.4% spoke Romanian, 12.0% spoke Russian, 9.2% spoke Yiddish. Classified by religion: 87.0% were Orthodox Christian, 9.2% Jewish, 1.9% Baptist, 1.0% Old Believers, and 0.3% Roman Catholic.

According to Russian census of 1897, Ukrainians (Little Russians) represented the majority of population of Khotin Uyezd. There were 160,000 Ukrainians (55%) in rural areas, or 164,000 (53%) including urban areas.

=== Urban population ===
In 1930 the urban population of Hotin County was 15,334, which included 37.7% Jews, 36.6% Russians, 14.8% Ukrainians, 8.8% Romanians, and 1.5% Poles by ethnicity. The major mother tongues among the urban population were: Yiddish (37.6%), Russian (37.5%), Ukrainian (14.7%), Romanian (8.6%), and Polish (1.2%) The religious mix of the urban population was 57.6% Eastern Orthodox, 37.7% Jewish, 2.1% Old Believers, and 1.6% Roman Catholic.

== History ==
After the Union of Bessarabia with Romania in 1918, the county was part of Romania, which set up the county formally in 1925.

The area county of the county was occupied by the Soviet Union in 1940 and became part of the Moldavian SSR and the Ukrainian SSR. The area returned to Romanian administration following the Axis invasion of the Soviet Union in July 1941. A military administration was established and the region's Jewish population was either executed on the spot or deported to Transnistria, where further numbers were killed. Despite the Hotin County was geographically part of Bessarabia, it was not incorporated into the Bessarabia Governorate, but rather in the Bukovina Governorate, centered around the geographical region of Bukovina. Dorohoi County was also posteriously attached to the governorate even though it was not in Bukovina either. As the Soviet Union's offensive pushed the Axis powers back, the area again was under Soviet control. On September 12, 1944, Romania signed the Moscow Armistice with the Allies. The Armistice, as well as the subsequent peace treaty of 1947, confirmed the Soviet-Romanian border as it was on January 1, 1941. The areas of the county, along with the rest of the Moldavian SSR and the Ukrainian SSR, became part of the independent countries of Moldova and Ukraine, respectively.

== Noted people ==
- Meier Tzelniker, actor, born, Hotin, 1st. January, 1894.
