= Orhei County (Romania) =

Coordinates: 47°25′N 28°50′E

Județul Orhei
- County (Județ)
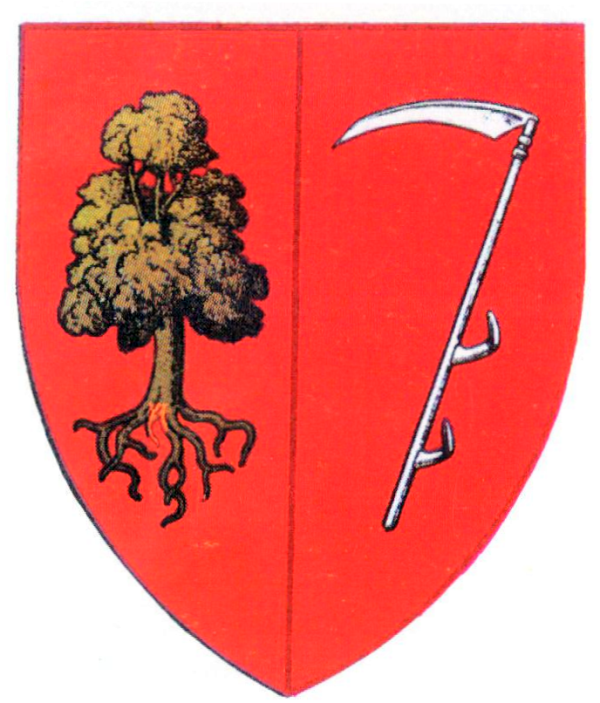
- Coat of arms

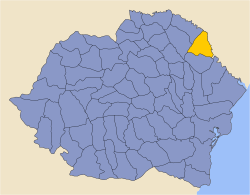
- Country: Romania
- Historic region: Bessarabia
- Capital city (Reședință de județ): Orhei
- Established: 1925 (first time); 1941 (second time)
- Ceased to exist: 1938 (first time); 1944 (second time)

Area
  - Total: 4,246 km^{2} (1,639 sq mi)

Population (1930)
  - Total: 279,292
  - Density: 65.78/km^{2} (170.4/sq mi)
- Time zone: UTC+2 (EET)
  - Summer (DST): UTC+3 (EEST)

Orhei was a county (Romanian: județ) in the Kingdom of Romania between 1925 and 1938, and again between 1941 and 1944, with the seat at Orhei.

== Geography ==
The county was located in the northeastern part of the Greater Romania, in the eastern part of the historical region of Bessarabia, at the border with the Soviet Union. At present, its territory is part of the Republic of Moldova. It is bordered to the northwest by the counties of Soroca and Bălți, to the northeast and the east by the Soviet Union and to the south by Lăpușna County.

Orhei County was the successor of the Orhei District of the Principality of Moldavia or the Russian Empire in the central part, bordering on the north with the Soroca District, in the east by the river Dniester, in the west by the Bălţi District, and in the south by Lăpuşna District. The northernmost of the settlements was Poiana, in Plasa Rezina, and the southernmost was Criuleni. The capital of the county was the Orhei, and the total area of Orhei county was 4,026 square kilometres (1,554 sq mi).

The county had four cities: Orhei, Rezina, Telenești, and Șoldănești, and 235 villages.

== Administrative organization ==
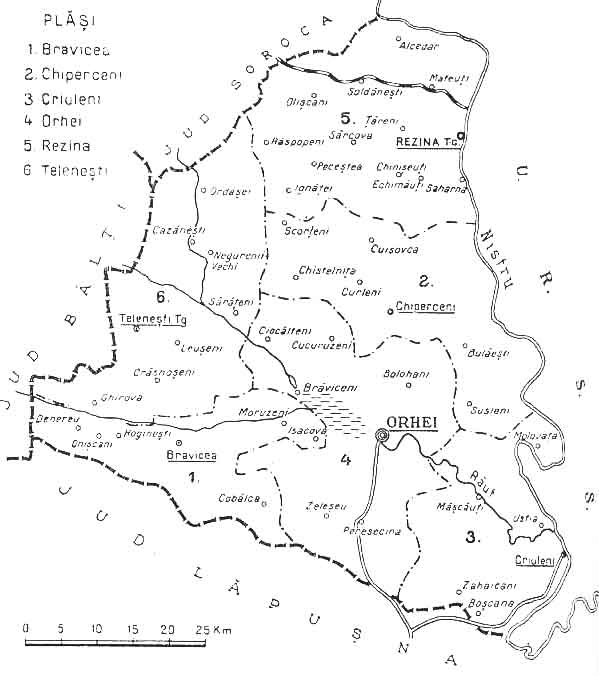
Map of Orhei County as constituted in 1938.

Originally, the county was administratively divided into four districts (plăși):

1. Plasa Bravicea, headquartered at Bravicea
2. Plasa Ciocâlteni, headquartered at Ciocâlteni
3. Plasa Măscăuți, headquartered at Măscăuți
4. Plasa Rezina, headquartered at Rezina

Subsequently, two more were established:

1. Plasa Criuleni, headquartered at Criuleni
2. Plasa Orhei, headquartered at Orhei

As of 1938, the county was administratively divided into six districts:

1. Plasa Bravicea, headquartered at Bravicea
2. Plasa Chiperceni, headquartered at Chiperceni
3. Plasa Criuleni, headquartered at Criuleni
4. Plasa Orhei, headquartered at Orhei
5. Plasa Telenești, headquartered at Telenești
6. Plasa Rezina, headquartered at Rezina

== History ==
After the Union of Bessarabia with Romania in 1918, the county belonged to Romania, which set up the county formally in 1925.

After the 1938 Administrative and Constitutional Reform, this county merged with the counties of Lăpușna, Cetatea Albă and Tighina to form Ținutul Nistru.

The area of the county was occupied by the Soviet Union in 1940 and became part of the Moldavian SSR. The area returned to Romanian administration as the Bessarabia Governorate following the Axis invasion of the Soviet Union in July 1941. A military administration was established and the region's Jewish population was either executed on the spot or deported to Transnistria, where further numbers were killed. As the Soviet Union's offensive pushed the Axis powers back, the area again was under Soviet control. On September 12, 1944, Romania signed the Moscow Armistice with the Allies. The Armistice, as well as the subsequent peace treaty of 1947, confirmed the Soviet-Romanian border as it was on January 1, 1941. The area of the county, along with the rest of the Moldavian SSR, became part of the independent country of Moldova.

== Population ==
According to the census data of 1930, the county's population was 279,292, of which 87.3% were ethnic Romanians, 6.8% Jews, 3.9% Russians, as well as other minorities. From the religious point of view 92.3% of the population was Eastern Orthodox, 7.0% Jewish, as well as other minorities.

=== Urban population ===
In the year 1930, the county's urban population was ethnically divided as follows: 52.2% Romanians, 41.2% Jews, 4.5% Russians, as well as other minorities. From a religious point of view, the urban population consisted of 54.7% Eastern Orthodox, 41.9% Jewish, as well as other minorities.
