= Meleșeni =

- Village
- Location within Moldova
- Coordinates: 47°22′32″N 28°23′20″E
- Country: Moldova
- District: Călărași District

Government
  - Mayor: Valeriu Zubcu (PDM)

Population (2014 census)
  - Total: 1,577
- Time zone: UTC+2 (EET)
  - Summer (DST): UTC+3 (EEST)
- Postal code: MD-4425

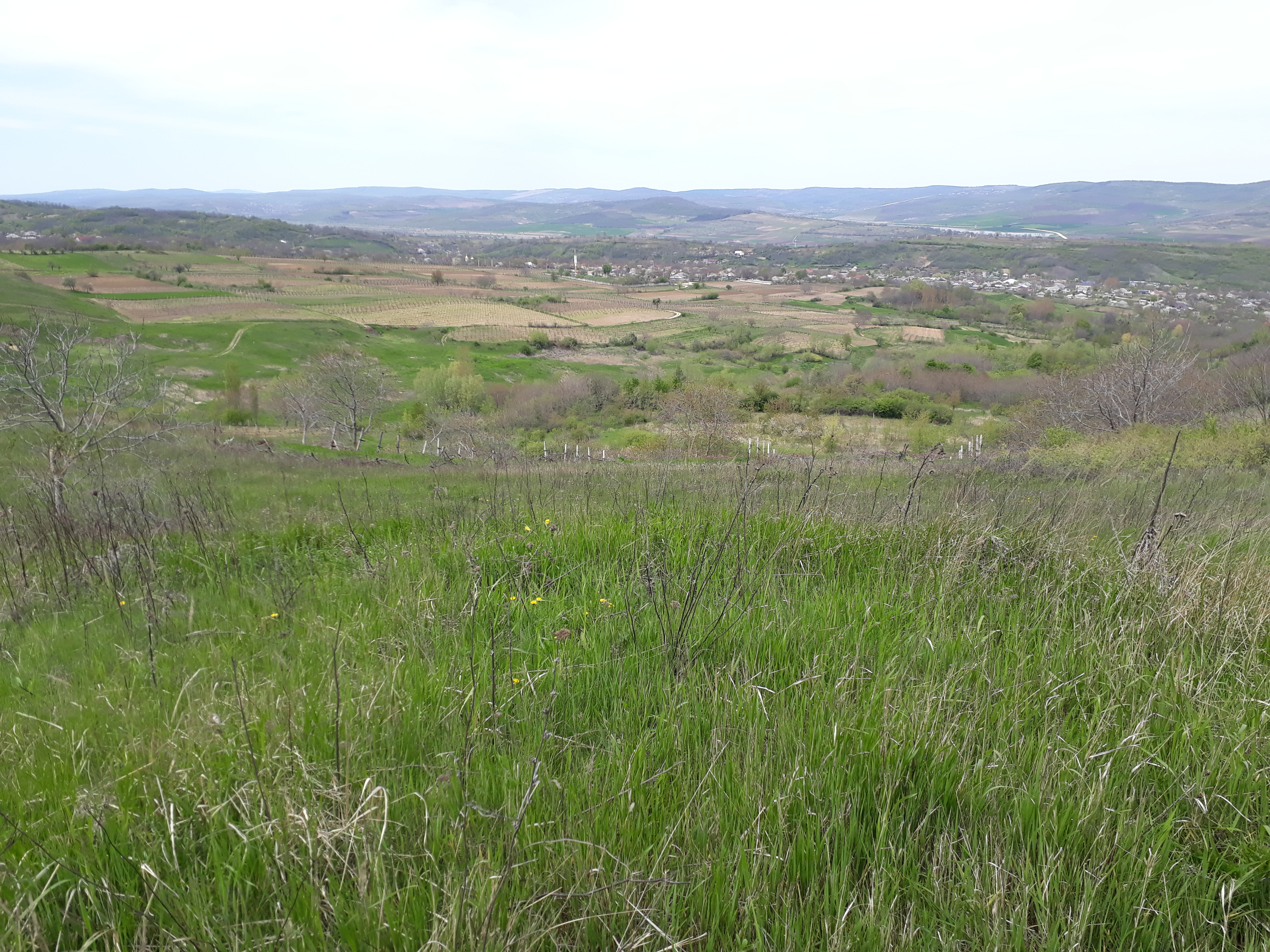

Meleșeni is a village in Călărași District, Moldova.
