= Bessarabia Governorate (Romania) =

Romanian autonomous province existent during World War II

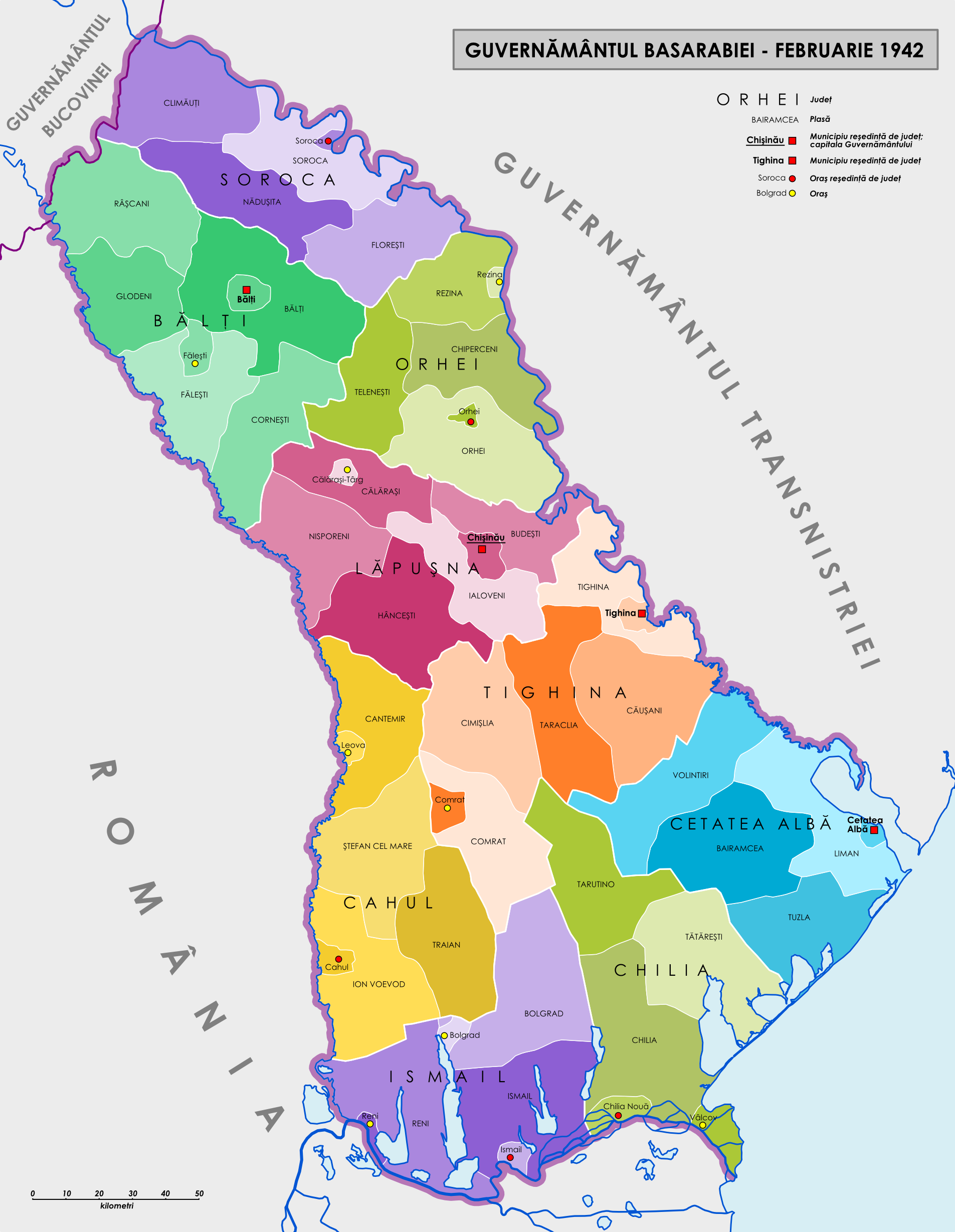
Administrative divisions of the Bessarabia Governorate

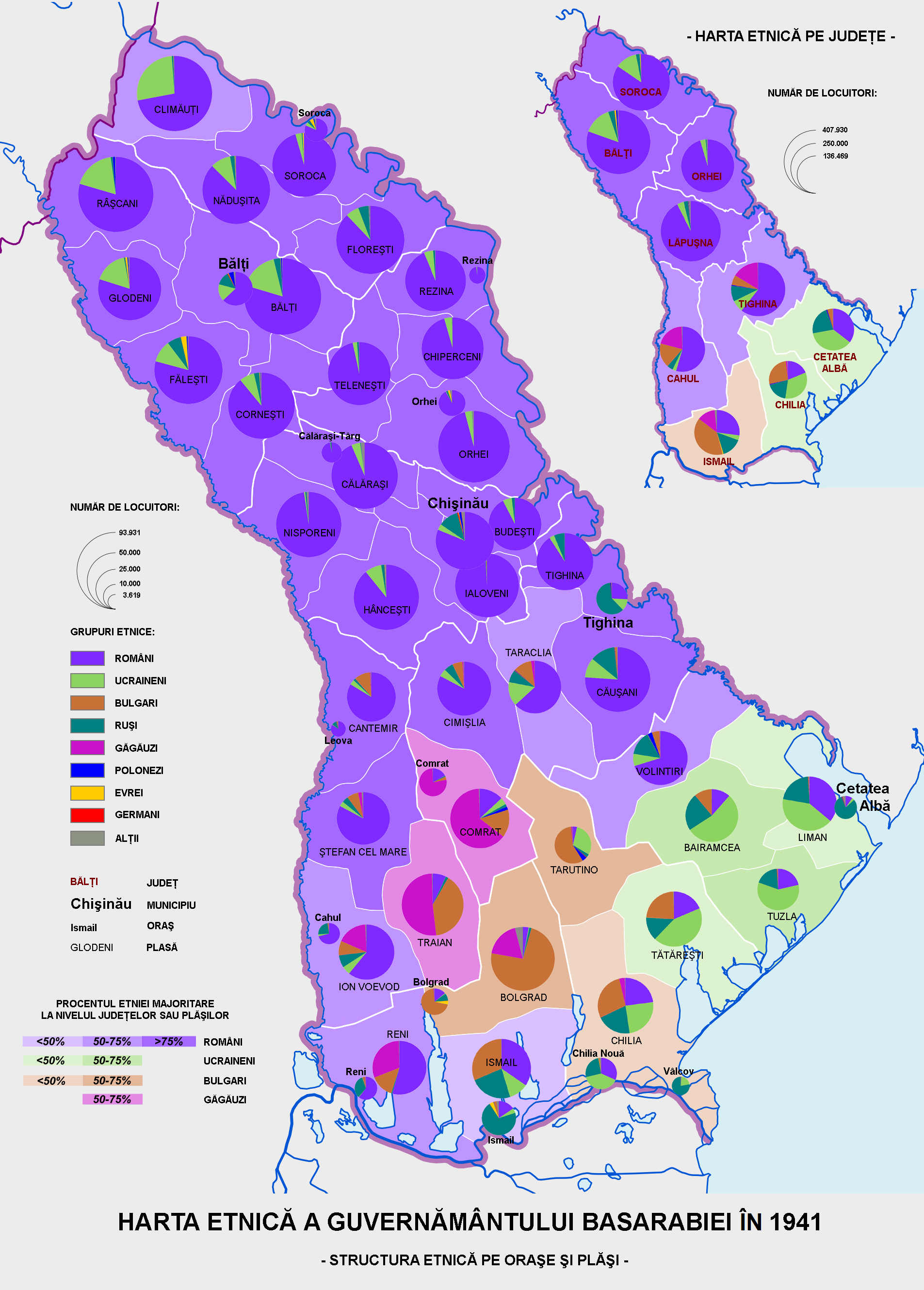
Ethnic map of the Bessarabia Governorate according to the 1941 Romanian census

The Bessarabia Governorate (Romanian: Guvernământul Basarabiei) was an administrative unit of Romania during World War II.

== Background and history ==
In 1812, the region of Bessarabia, lying between the Prut and Dniester rivers and historically part of the principality of Moldavia, was annexed by the Russian Empire. This marked the start of a strong process of Russification and colonization of Bessarabia which severely dwindled the presence of the Romanian population. If in 1817 Moldavians were 86% of the population, in 1897 they were only 56%. Previously, Moldavia had also lost the region of Bukovina, annexed in 1775 by the Austrian Habsburg monarchy. In 1859, this country united with another Romanian principality, Wallachia, creating the first modern Romanian state. Later, in 1917, during World War I to which Romania had joined in order to gain several Romanian-populated regions, the Russian Revolution sparked, and this allowed Bessarabia to declare itself as independent, forming the Moldavian Democratic Republic. Following a Romanian military intervention in the region, on 27 March 1918, Bessarabia united with Romania.

This event would become the reason of discord between Romania and the newly formed Soviet Union (USSR). During the interwar period, Romania focused on trying to defend and secure its new borders with the help of France and the United Kingdom (UK), but at the start of World War II, Romania was left vulnerable, and in a 1940 ultimatum, the Soviet Union demanded and captured Bessarabia, as well as Northern Bukovina as "compensation" for the "great loss brought to the Bessarabian population".

Following this, Romania was forced to accept Hitler's mediation that resulted in territorial losses to Hungary and Bulgaria and later became a member of the Axis powers. The Axis would invade the Soviet Union on 22 June 1941, but Romanian military actions only began on 2 July. After a few weeks, Bessarabia and Northern Bukovina were recaptured and integrated back into Romania. Subsequently, the Transnistria Governorate would also be established, although it was never formally annexed unlike the other two regions.

Despite the fact that Bukovina and Bessarabia were already under Romanian control again, it was decided that the regions would not be fully integrated within the country, but that they would rather remain as autonomous regions ruled by a governor (governorates). The new Bessarabia Governorate was organized in nine counties, which were Bălți, Cetatea Albă, Cahul, Chilia, Ismail, Lăpușna, Orhei, Soroca and Tighina. The capital of this governorate was Chișinău, in the Lăpușna County. It did not include the interwar Hotin County in the northern part of the geographic region of Bessarabia, which was attached to the Bukovina Governorate instead. The Bessarabia Governorate had two governors: Constantin Voiculescu and Olimpiu Stavrat.

As soon as Romanian troops entered Bessarabia in 1941, they began a campaign to exterminate the local Jews, which amounted to 122,000 at the beginning of the Romanian administration. The order was given by the Conducător ("Leader") of Romania Ion Antonescu of his own accord and under no German pressure. Special teams instigated the locals to kill Jews on their own and, when this failed, special orders were delivered to local garrisons to have them executed. The Romanian Army's campaign of ethnic cleansing in Bessarabia was already in place by 6 July 1941, when 500 Jews were killed in the town of Edineț, reaching Chișinău by 17 July 1941, when several thousands were killed on a single day. The army was joined by the Romanian Gendarmerie, which received orders to "exterminate on the spot all Jews in rural areas" and "imprison in ghettos all Jews in urban areas". Jews turned over to the gendarmes by the army had no chance of survival and were shot immediately. On 11 July 1941, the Einsatzgruppen D started its own extermination campaign in Bălți, and by mid-August, the unit had murdered 4,425 Jews in the northern part of Bessarabia. As the Romanians left corpses unburied whenever they plundered, raped or fired shots in the streets and received bribes from Jews, the Nazis issued letters, protests and orders decrying the lack of organization and planning. Beginning with 24 July 1941, a parallel campaign of deporting the surviving Jews across the Dniester began. The convoys of deportees were not provided with food or water and had to sleep in improvised camps surrounded by barbed wire in the middle of a plowed field. Hundreds of Jews were pushed into the Dniester and whoever attempted to climb out was shot. As the Germans refused to allow the transit of Jews across the river, several ghettos were set up across Bessarabia, hosting about 80,000 Jews by late August 1941. 25,000 of them would die in these camps, characterized by forced labor, corruption, hunger, plunder, suffering, rapes, executions and epidemics; before death marches across the Dniester were resumed after an agreement with Nazi Germany on 30 August 1941. Consequently, 55,867 Jews from Bessarabia were deported into Transnistria. The killings, along deportations, continued until October 1941, when all Jews had been removed from Bessarabia. More than 45,000 Jews, likely 60,000, were killed in Bessarabia and Bukovina. Furthermore, until 15 November 1943, between 104,522 and 120,810 Romanian citizens of Jewish ethnicity or descent originating in Bessarabia, Bukovina and the Old Kingdom died in Transnistria as a result of typhus, hunger, cold or straightforward murder.

At first, Ion Antonescu had become convinced that Nazi Germany would win the war. This was up to the Battle of Stalingrad, which resulted in defeat for the Axis. He realized after this that German victory would not be possible and began to reinforce the east of the country. The ensuing evolution of the war made Antonescu make an evacuation plan for the Bessarabia Governorate, as well as for the Bukovina Governorate, the rest of the region of Moldavia and the Transnistria Governorate. This plan was named "Operation 1111", and it was divided in three suboperations, which were "Operation 1111 A" for Bessarabia and Transnistria, "Operation 1111 B" for Bukovina and "Operation 1111 M" for the rest of Moldavia.

In the end, a coup in 1944 ended with the overthrow of Antonescu by King Michael I and Romania changed sides and joined the Allies, giving up Bessarabia and Northern Bukovina to the Soviet Union "in exchange" for the recovery of Northern Transylvania from Hungary and marking the end of the Bessarabia Governorate.

== See also ==
- Bukovina Governorate
- Transnistria Governorate
- Bessarabia Governorate (Russia)
- The Holocaust in Romania
