= Tighina County (Romania) =

Județul Tighina
- County (Județ)
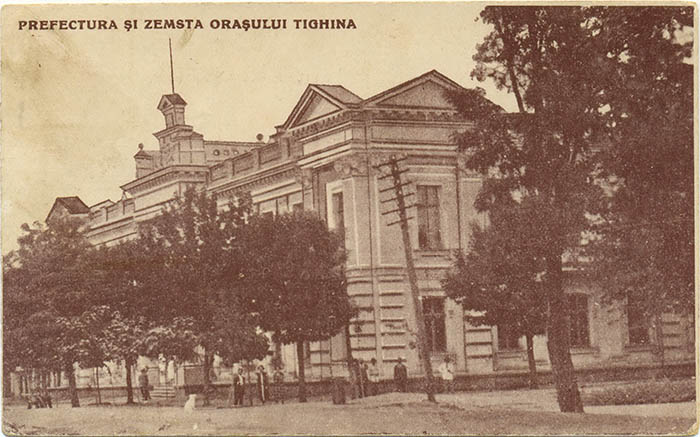
- Tighina County prefect's building from the interwar period.

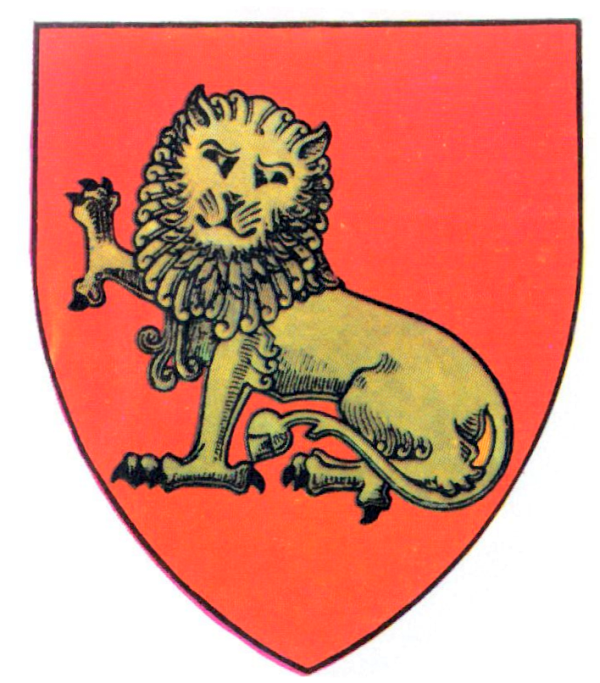
- Coat of arms

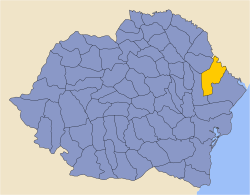
- Country: Romania
- Historic region: Bessarabia
- Capital city (Reședință de județ): Tighina
- Established: 1925 (first time); 1941 (second time)
- Ceased to exist: 1938 (first time); 1944 (second time)

Area
  - Total: 6,333 km^{2} (2,445 sq mi)

Population (1930)
  - Total: 306,592
  - Density: 48.41/km^{2} (125.4/sq mi)
- Time zone: UTC+2 (EET)
  - Summer (DST): UTC+3 (EEST)

Tighina County was a county (Romanian: județ) in the Kingdom of Romania between 1925 and 1938 and between 1941 and 1944.

== Geography ==
The county was located in the eastern part of Greater Romania, in the southeastern part of the historical region of Bessarabia, at the border with Soviet Union. At present, the territory of the former county is part of the Republic of Moldova.

Tighina County was bordered to the west by Cahul County, to the north by Lăpușna County, and to the south by Cetatea-Albă County. To the east was the Soviet border on the other side of the Dniester River.

== Administrative organization ==
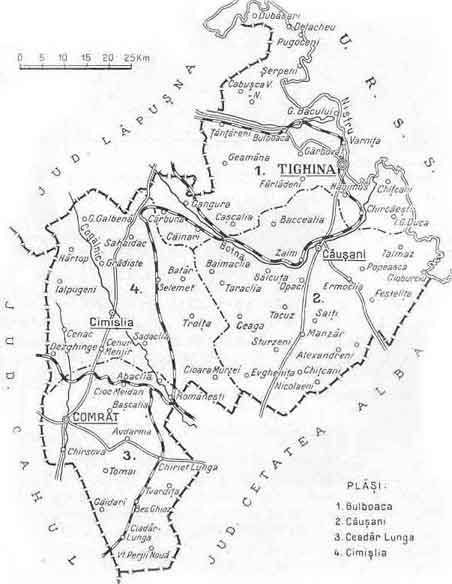
Map of Tighina County as constituted in 1938.

The county was administrative subdivided into four districts (plăși):

1. Plasa Bulboaca, headquartered at Bulboaca
2. Plasa Căușani, headquartered at Căușani
3. Plasa Ceadâr-Lunga, headquartered at Ceadâr-Lunga
4. Plasa Cimișlia, headquartered at Cimișlia

Tighina County had two urban localities:

- Tighina, an urban commune and the county seat.
- Comrat, an urban commune located in the western part of the county.

== History ==
After the Union of Bessarabia with Romania in 1918, the county belonged to the Kingdom of Romania, which set up the county formally in 1925.

After the 1938 Administrative and Constitutional Reform, this county merged with the counties of Lăpușna, Cetatea Albă, and Orhei to form Ținutul Nistru.

The area of the county was occupied by the Soviet Union in 1940 and became part of the Moldavian SSR. The area returned to Romanian administration as the Bessarabia Governorate following the Axis invasion of the Soviet Union in July 1941. A military administration was established and the region's Jewish population was either executed on the spot or deported to the Transnistria Governorate, where further numbers were killed. As the Soviet Union's offensive pushed the Axis powers back, the area again was under Soviet control. On September 12, 1944, Romania signed the Moscow Armistice with the Allies. The Armistice, as well as the subsequent peace treaty of 1947, confirmed the Soviet-Romanian border as it was on January 1, 1941. The area of the county, along with the rest of the Moldavian SSR, became part of the independent Republic of Moldova.

== Population ==
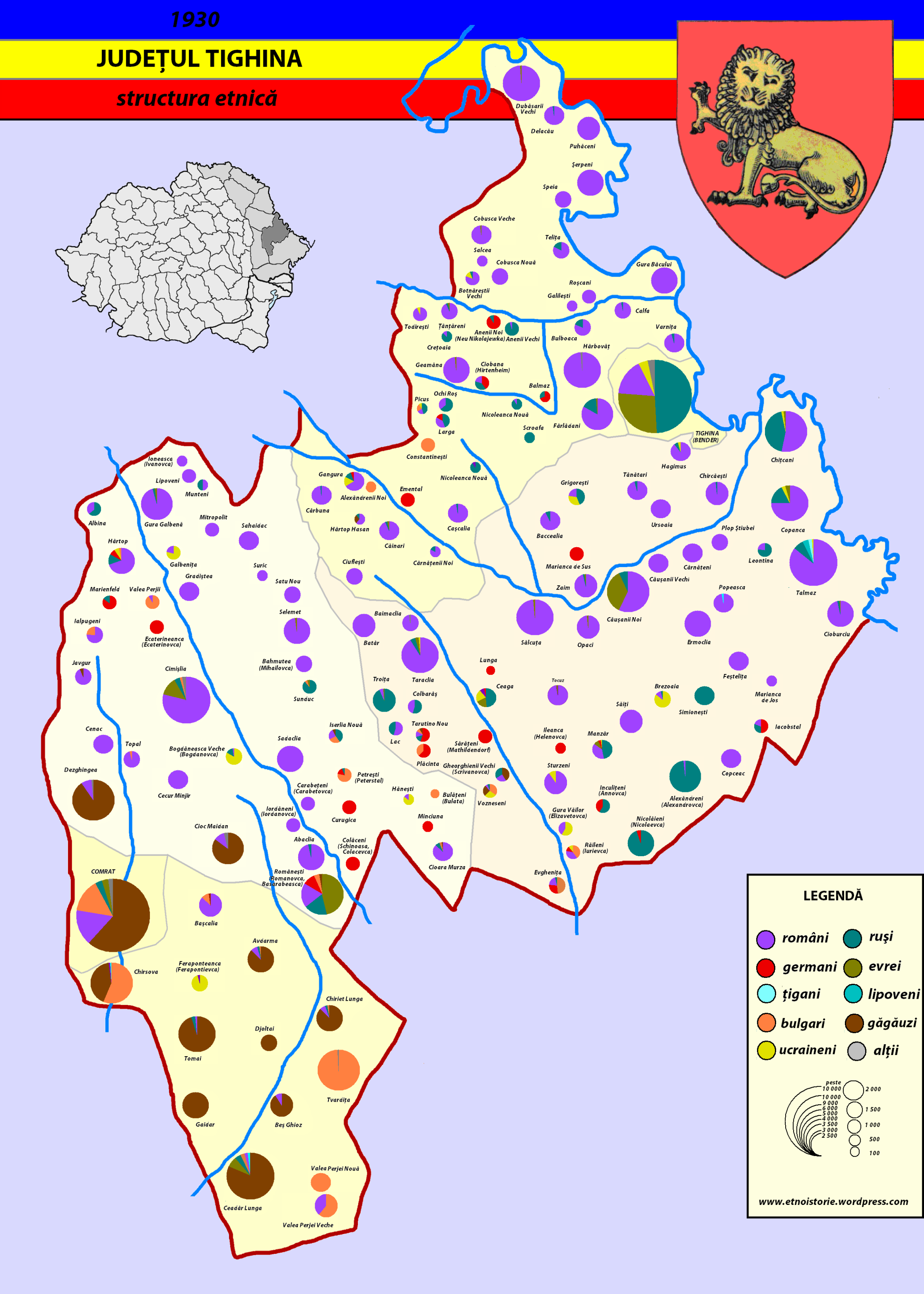
Map of the ethnic groups of Tighina County per the 1930 census.

According to the census data of 1930, the county's population was 306,592, of which 53.4% were ethnic Romanians, 14.7% Russians, 12.8% Gagauz, 6.4% Bulgarians, 5.5% Jews, 3.4% Germans, 3.0% Ukrainians, 0.4% Romanies, as well as other minorities. From the religious point of view, the population consisted of 89.4% Eastern Orthodox, 5.5% Jewish, 3.0% Lutherans, 0.8% Old-style Orthodox, 0.6% Roman Catholic, 0.4% Baptist, as well as other minorities.

Nr.	Orașe, plăși	Populație
1	city of Tighina	31,384
2	city of Comrat	12,331
	Total urban	43,715
1	Plasa Bulboaca	57,280
2	Plasa Căușani	99,161
3	Plasa Ceadâr-Lunga	41,416
4	Plasa Cimișlia	65,020
	Total rural	262,877
	Total county	306,592

=== Urban population ===
In the year 1930, the county's urban population was 44,057, of which 35.6% were ethnic Russians, 19.8% Jews, 17.7% Gagauz, 16.7% Romanians, 4.4% Bulgarians, 3.1% Ukrainians, as well as other minorities. From a religious point of view, the urban population consisted of 75.1% Eastern Orthodox, 19.9% Jewish, 2.5% Old-style Orthodox, 1.0% Roman Catholic, 0.6% Lutheran, as well as other minorities.
