= Cetatea Albă County =

Former county in Romania

Județul Cetatea Albă
- County (Județ)
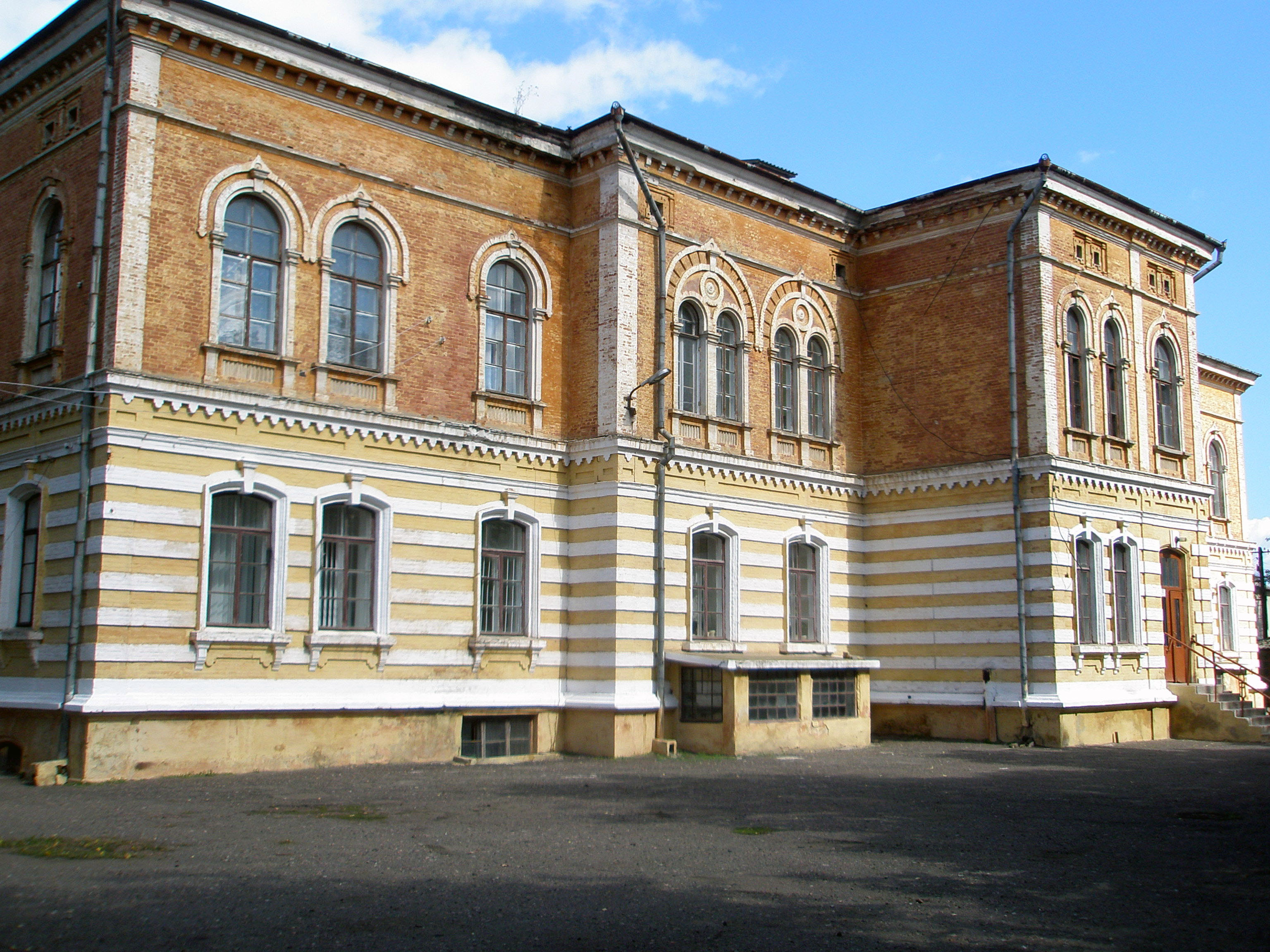
- Cetatea Albă County prefecture building of the interwar period.

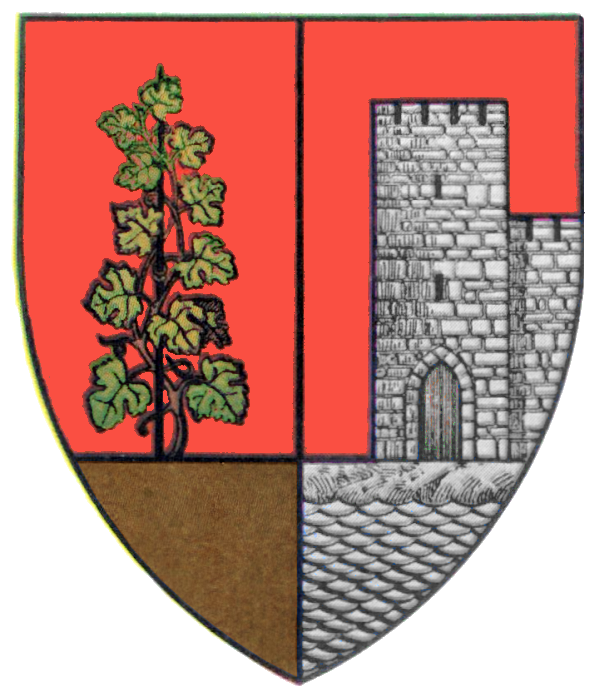
- Coat of arms

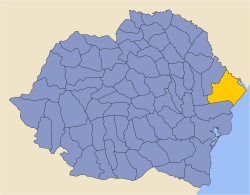
- Country: Romania
- Historic region: Bessarabia
- Capital city (Reședință de județ): Cetatea Albă
- Established: 1925 (first time); 1941 (second time)
- Ceased to exist: 1938 (first time); 1944 (second time)

Government
  - Type: Prefect

Area
  - Total: 7,595 km^{2} (2,932 sq mi)

Population (1930)
  - Total: 340,459
  - Density: 44.83/km^{2} (116.1/sq mi)
- Time zone: UTC+2 (EET)
  - Summer (DST): UTC+3 (EEST)

Cetatea Albă County was a county (județ) of Romania between 1925 and 1938 and between 1941 and 1944, in Bessarabia, with the capital city at Cetatea Albă. It had an area of 7,595 square kilometres (2,932 sq mi) and a population of 340,459 as of the 1930 census.

== Geography ==
The county was located in the eastern part of Greater Romania, in the south of the historical region of Bessarabia. Currently, the territory of the former county is partly administered by Odesa Oblast of Ukraine. It was bordered to the west by Cahul County, to the north by Tighina County, to the south by Ismail County, to the east by the Odesa Oblast of Ukraine, and in the southeast the county bordered the Black Sea.

== Administration ==
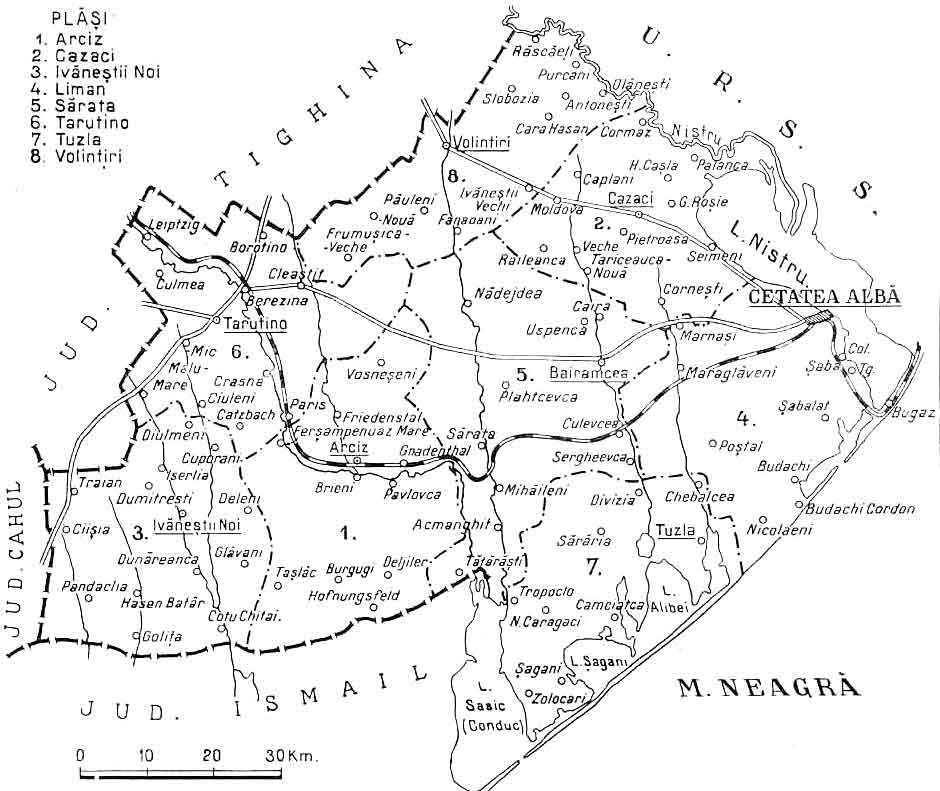
Map of Cetatea Albă County as constituted in 1938.

The county originally consisted of six districts (plăși):

1. Plasa Cazaci, headquartered at Cazaci
2. Plasa Tarutino, headquartered at Tarutina
3. Plasa Tașlâc, headquartered at Arciz
4. Plasa Tatar-Bunar, headquartered at Tatar-Bunar
5. Plasa Tuzla, headquartered at Cetatea Albă
6. Plasa Volintiri, headquartered at Volințiri

Subsequently, the territory of the county was reorganized into eight districts:

1. Plasa Arciz, headquartered at Arciz
2. Plasa Cazaci, headquartered at Cazaci
3. Plasa Ivăneștii-Noi, headquartered at Ivăneștii Noi
4. Plasa Liman, headquartered at Cetatea Albă
5. Plasa Sărata, headquartered at Bairamcea
6. Plasa Tarutino, headquartered at Tarutina
7. Plasa Tuzla, headquartered at Tuzla
8. Plasa Volintiri, headquartered at Volințiri

On the territory of Cetatea Albă County there were two urban localities: Cetatea Albă, a city and the county seat, and Tuzla, an urban commune (town).

== Coat of arms ==
The Coat of Arms featured a tree on the sinister and the fortress of Cetatea Albă on the dexter.

== Population ==
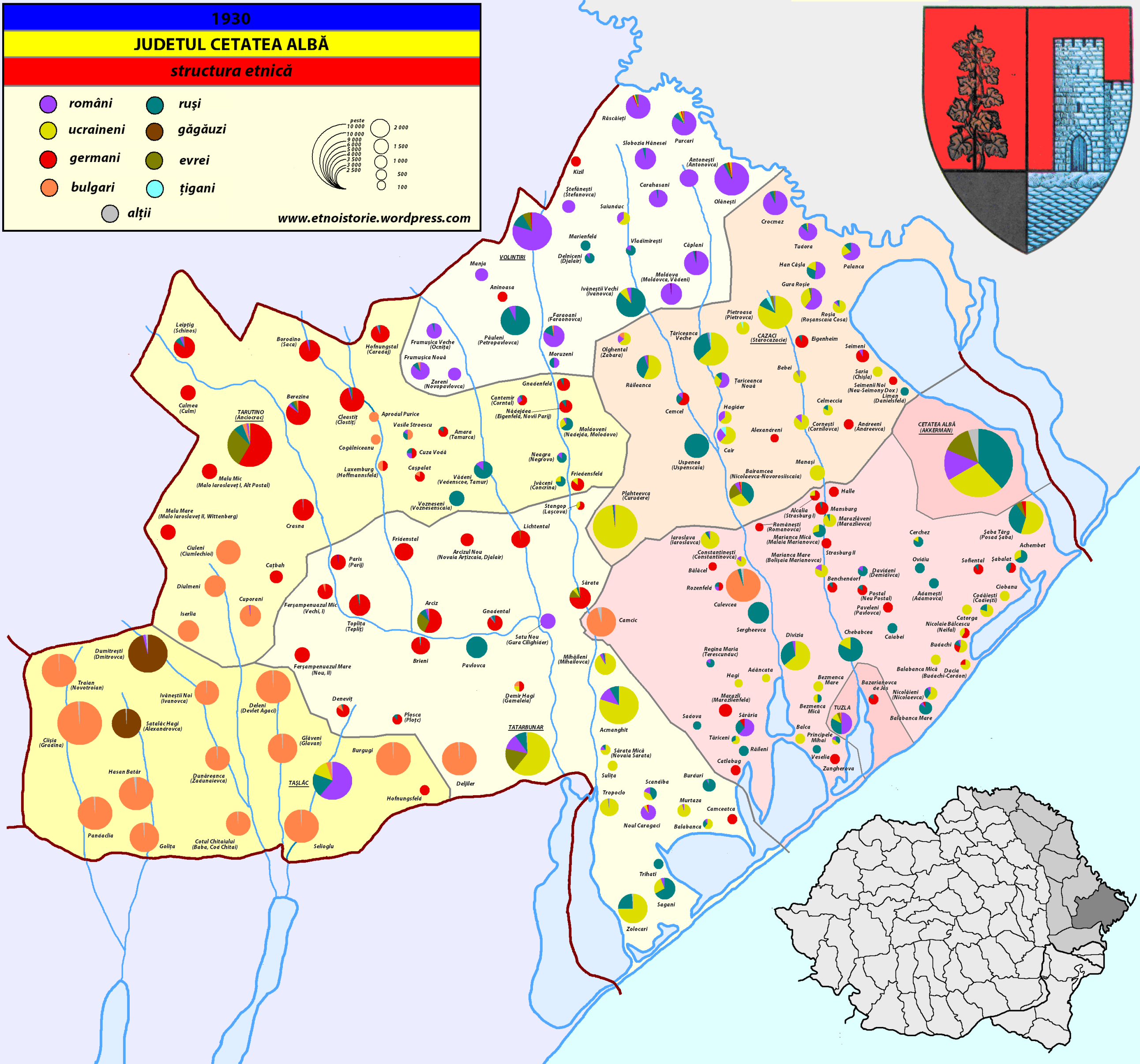
Ethnic map of Cetatea Albă County per the 1930 census.

According to the Romanian census of 1930 the population of Cetatea Albă County was 340,459, of which 20.9% were ethnic Bulgarians, 20.5% ethnic Ukrainians, 18.5% Romanians, 17.3% Russians 16.3% ethnic Germans, 3.3% Jews, 3.3% Gagauz and 0.1% Armenians. Classified by religion: 79.0% were Orthodox Christian, 16.3% Lutheran, 4.7% Jews.

| Nr. | City, town, or district | Population |
|---|---|---|
| 1 | city of Cetatea Albă (including suburbs) | 34,485 |
| a | suburb Păpușoi | 4,167 |
| b | suburb Șaba | 787 |
| c | suburb Turlachi | 8,624 |
| 2 | town of Tuzla (including suburbs) | 3,146 |
| a | suburb Bazareanca | 477 |
| | Total urban | 37,631 |
| 1 | Plasa Cazaci | 49,144 |
| 2 | Plasa Tarutino | 46,162 |
| 3 | Plasa Tașlâc | 61,042 |
| 4 | Plasa Tatar-Bunar | 58,502 |
| 5 | Plasa Tuzla | 44,605 |
| 6 | Plasa Volintiri | 44,090 |
| | Total rural | 303,545 |
| | Total county | 341,176 |

== History ==
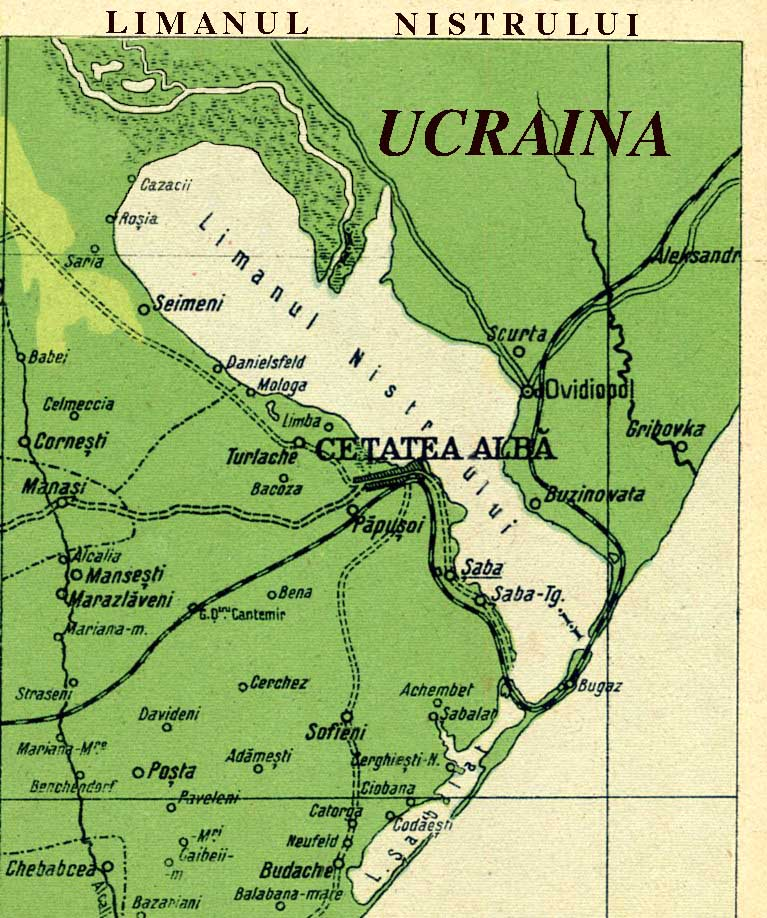
Map of the Dniester Liman from a 1927 Romanian textbook

After the Union of Bessarabia with Romania in 1918, the county belonged to Romania, which set up the county formally in 1925.

After the 1938 Administrative and Constitutional Reform, this county merged with the counties of Lăpușna, Orhei and Tighina to form Ținutul Nistru.

The area of the county was occupied by the Soviet Union in 1940 and became part of the Ukrainian SSR. The area returned to Romanian administration as the Bessarabia Governorate following the Axis invasion of the Soviet Union in July 1941. A military administration was established and the region's Jewish population was either executed on the spot or deported to Transnistria, where further numbers were killed. As the Soviet Union's offensive pushed the Axis powers back, the area again was under Soviet control. On September 12, 1944, Romania signed the Moscow Armistice with the Allies. The Armistice, as well as the subsequent peace treaty of 1947, confirmed the Soviet-Romanian border as it was on January 1, 1941. The area of the county became part of the Ukrainian SSR and eventually of the independent Ukraine after the dissolution of the Soviet Union in 1991.
