= Bădiceni =

- Commune
- Location within Moldova
- Coordinates: 48.2033333333°N 28.0544444444°E
- Country: Moldova
- District: Soroca

Government
  - Mayor: Palamari Vasilii (Party of Communists of the Republic of Moldova)
- Elevation: 218 m (715 ft)

Population (2014)
  - Total: 2,941
- Time zone: UTC+2 (EET)
  - Summer (DST): UTC+3 (EEST)

Bădiceni is a commune in Soroca District, Moldova. It is composed of two villages, Bădiceni and Grigorăuca.

== Demographics ==
According to the 2014 Moldovan census, Bădiceni had a population of 2,941 residents. With a total land area of 48.20 square kilometers, the population density was approximately 61 people per square kilometer. The commune experienced a slight population decline of 1.5% between the 2004 and 2014 censuses, indicating a modest trend of depopulation over that decade.

The gender distribution was nearly even, with 49.1% male (1,443 individuals) and 50.9% female (1,498 individuals). The age structure reveals that Bădiceni had a predominantly working-age population: 13.3% were children aged 0–14, 72.5% were adults aged 15–64, and 14.2% were aged 65 and older.

Virtually all residents lived in rural settings, and the vast majority (99.3%) were born in Moldova. A small minority (0.7%) originated from other countries in the Commonwealth of Independent States.

Ethnically, the population was predominantly Moldovan (82.6%), with Romanians comprising 15.7%. Small communities of Romani (0.7%), Ukrainians (0.5%), and Russians (0.5%) were also present. In terms of language, 59% of residents reported Moldovan as their native language, while 39% identified Romanian. Other languages spoken included Russian (1%), Romani (0.7%), and Ukrainian (0.3%).

Religion in Bădiceni was homogeneously Orthodox, with all respondents identifying with this faith.

== Administration and local government ==
Bădiceni is governed by a local council composed of eleven members. The most recent local elections, in November 2023, resulted in the following composition: 8 councillors from the Party of Socialists of the Republic of Moldova and 3 councillors from the Party of Action and Solidarity. The Party of Development and Consolidation of Moldova, the Liberal Democratic Party of Moldova, and the Chance Political Party also ran, but did not get enough votes to elect councillors. In the same elections, the candidate from the Party of Socialists of the Republic of Moldova, Marin Avornicița, was elected as mayor with a 75.5% majority of the votes.
