= Bălți County (Romania) =

Județul Bălți
- County (Județ)
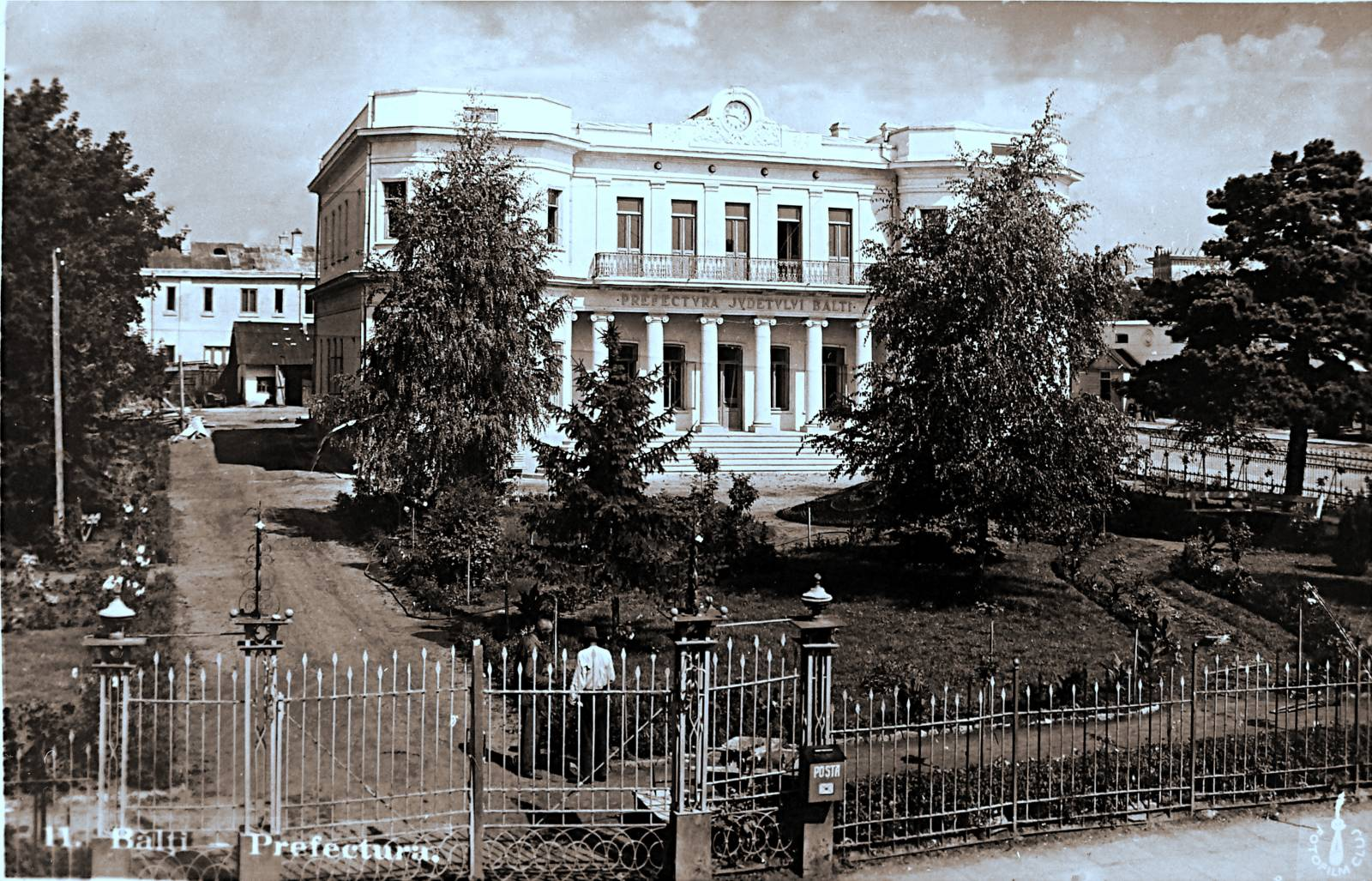
- The Prefecture of Bălți County building from the interwar period.

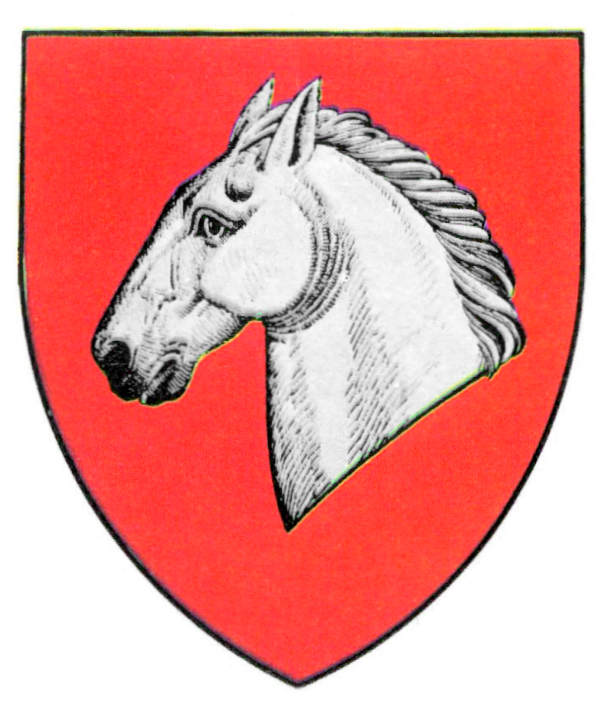
- Coat of arms

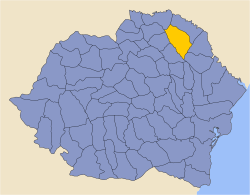
- Country: Romania
- Historic region: Bessarabia
- Capital city (Reședință de județ): Bălți
- Established: 1925 (first time); 1941 (second time)
- Ceased to exist: 1938 (first time); 1944 (second time)

Area
  - Total: 4,246 km^{2} (1,639 sq mi)

Population (1930)
  - Total: 386,476
  - Density: 91.02/km^{2} (235.7/sq mi)
- Time zone: UTC+2 (EET)
  - Summer (DST): UTC+3 (EEST)

Bălți County was a county (Romanian: județ) in the Kingdom of Romania between 1925 and 1938 and between 1941 and 1944, with the seat at Bălți.

The county was located in the eastern part of Greater Romania, in the northern part of Bessarabia. Its territory now belongs to the Republic of Moldova, covering almost the territory of Moldova's Bălți County, which existed between 1998 and 2003.

Bălți County neighboured the counties of Soroca to the east, Orhei to the south-east, Lăpușna and Iași to the south-west, Botoșani to the north-east, and Hotin to the north.

== Administration ==
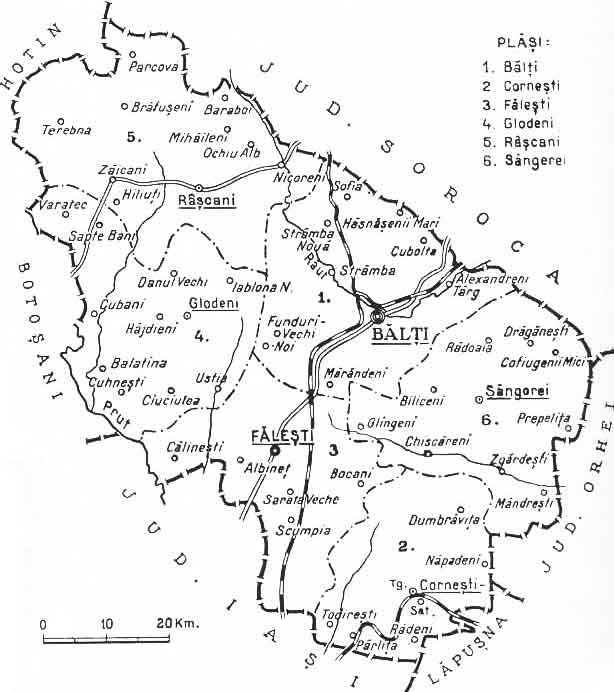
Map of Bălți County as constituted in 1938.

The county was originally administratively subdivided into three districts (plăși):

1. Plasa Fălești, headquartered at Fălești
2. Plasa Râșcani, headquartered at Râșcani
3. Plasa Slobozia, headquartered at Slobozia

Later, Bălți County was reorganized from the administrative point of view. The number of districts increased to six, by abolishing Plasa Slobozia and creating four new districts:

1. Plasa Bălți, headquartered at Bălți
2. Plasa Cornești, headquartered at Cornești
3. Plasa Glodeni, headquartered at Glodeni
4. Plasa Sângerei, headquartered at Sângerei

At the census of Autumn 1941, the county had the following administrative organization:

1. Municipality of Bălți
2. Plasa Bălți, headquartered at Bălți
3. Plasa Cornești, headquartered at Cornești
4. Plasa Fălești, headquartered at Fălești
5. Plasa Glodeni, headquartered at Glodeni
6. Plasa Râșcani, headquartered at Râșcani

== Population ==
According to the census data of 1930, the county's population was 386,721, of which 70.1% were ethnic Romanians, 12.0% Russians, 8.2% Jews, 7.6% Ukrainians, as well as other minorities. From the religious point of view 89.3% of the population was Eastern Orthodox, 8.3% Jewish, 0.8% Roman Catholic, as well as other minorities.

=== Urban population ===
In the year 1930, the county's urban population was 30,570, of which 46.5% were ethnic Jews, 29.0% Romanians, 17.7% Russians, 3.2% Poles, as well as other minorities. In the urban area the mother tongues were divided as follows: Yiddish (45.5%), followed by Romanian (28.1%), Russian (21.7%), Polish (2.0%), Ukrainian (1.1%), as well as other minorities. From a religious point of view, the urban population consisted of 47.1% Eastern Orthodox, 46.6% Jewish, 4.1% Roman Catholic, as well as other minorities.

Census data of 1941 - during World War II - indicate the county's population was 407,930, of which 80.44% were ethnic Romanians, 14.38% Ukrainians, 3.11% Russians, 0.78% Poles, 0.72% Jews, as well as other minorities.

== After 1938 ==
After the 1938 Administrative and Constitutional Reform, Bălți County merged with the counties of Bacău, Baia, Botoșani, Iași, Neamț, Roman, Soroca and Vaslui to form Ținutul Prut.

In June 1940, as a consequence of the Molotov–Ribbentrop Pact, Romania was compelled to cede Bessarabia and Northern Bukovina (including Bălți County) to the Soviet Union, leading to the creation of the Moldavian Soviet Socialist Republic (Moldavian SSR). The area returned to Romanian administration as the Bessarabia Governorate following the Axis invasion of the Soviet Union in July 1941. A military administration was established and the region's Jewish population was either executed on the spot or deported to the Transnistria Governorate, where further numbers were killed. As the Soviet Union's offensive pushed the Axis powers back, the area fell again under Soviet control. On September 12, 1944, Romania signed the Moscow Armistice with the Allies. The Armistice, as well as the subsequent Paris Peace Treaty of 1947, confirmed the Soviet-Romanian border as it was on January 1, 1941. The area of the county, along with the rest of the Moldavian SSR, became part of the independent country of Moldova in 1991.
