= Klishkivtsi =

Village in Khotyn Raion, Chernivtsi Oblast, Ukraine

Klishkivtsi Клішківці Clișcăuți
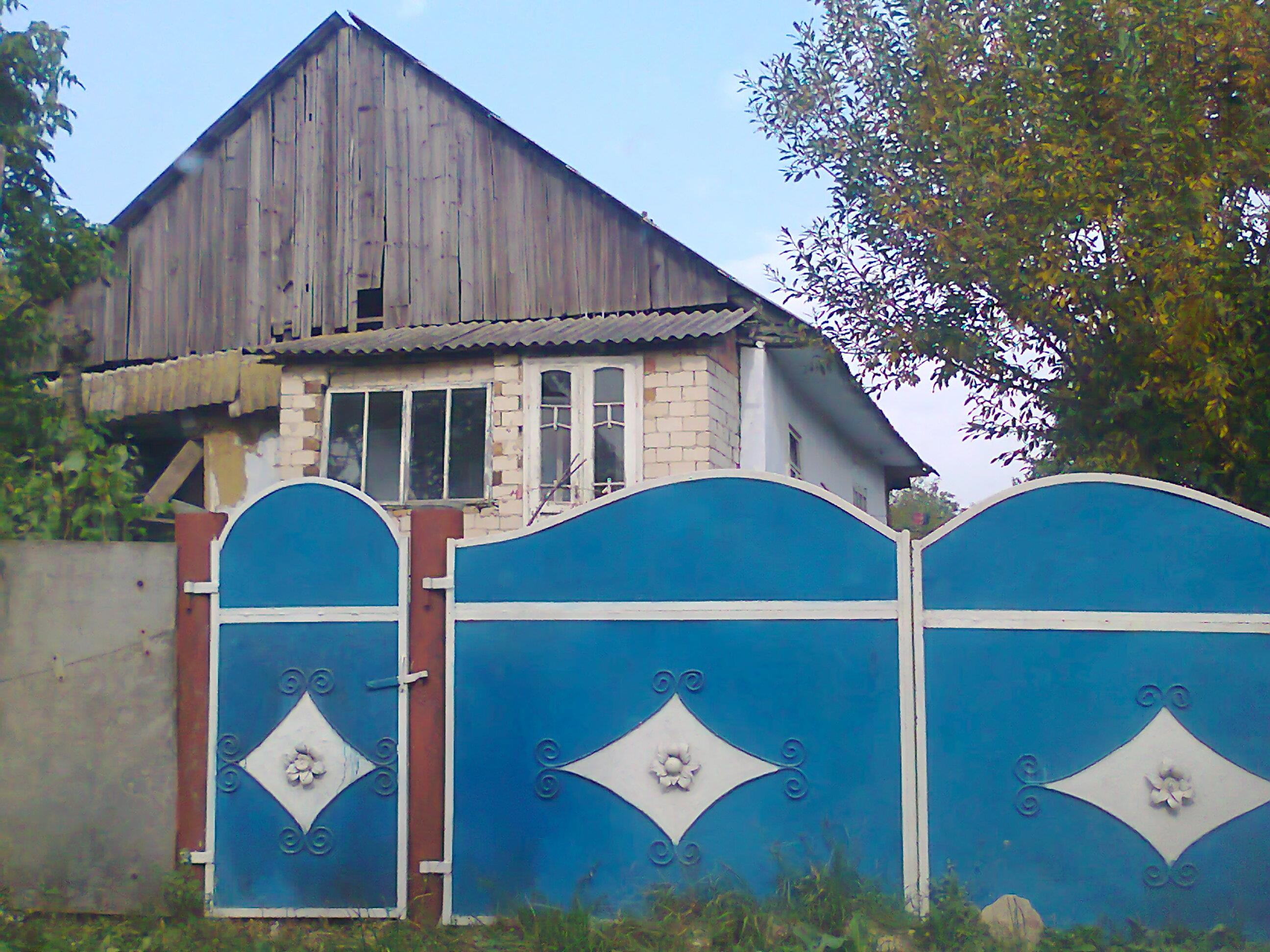
- Klishkivtsi’s former synagogue

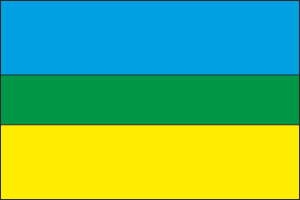
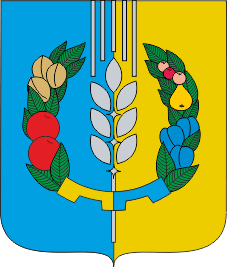
- Flag Coat of arms

- Location of Kelmentsi in Ukraine Klishkivtsi (Ukraine)
- Coordinates: 48°26′17″N 26°16′1″E
- Country: Ukraine
- Oblast: Chernivtsi Oblast
- Raion: Dniester Raion
- Founded: 1631
- Elevation: 354.4 m (1,163 ft)

Population (2021)
  - City: 6,972
  - Metro /Hromada: 7,456
- Time zone: UTC+2 (EET)
  - Summer (DST): UTC+3 (EEST)
- Postal code: 60014
- Area code: +380 03731

Klishkivtsi (Ukrainian: Клішківці; Romanian: Clișcăuți) is a commune (silrada) in Dniester Raion, Chernivtsi Oblast, Ukraine. It is composed of two villages, Klishkivtsi and Mlynky (Млинки; Mlinchi). It hosts the administration of Klishkivtsi rural hromada, one of the hromadas of Ukraine.

Until 18 July 2020, Klishkivtsi belonged to Khotyn Raion. The raion was abolished in July 2020 as part of the administrative reform of Ukraine, which reduced the number of raions of Chernivtsi Oblast to three. The area of Khotyn Raion was merged into Dniester Raion.
