= Lăpușna County (Romania) =

Județul Lăpușna
- County (Județ)
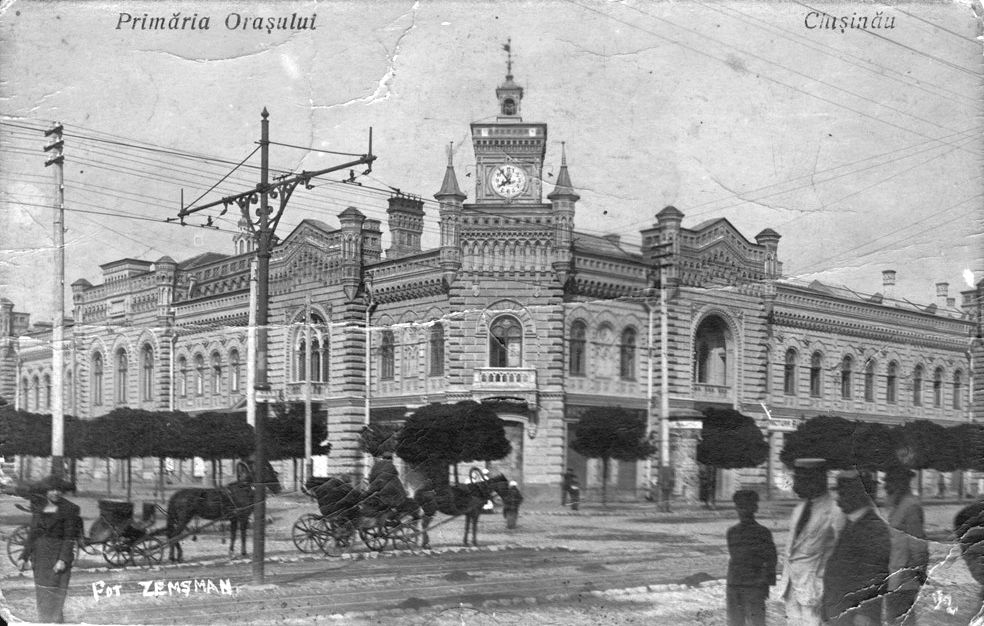
- Lăpușna County prefecture building during the interwar period, later used as Chişinău city hall.

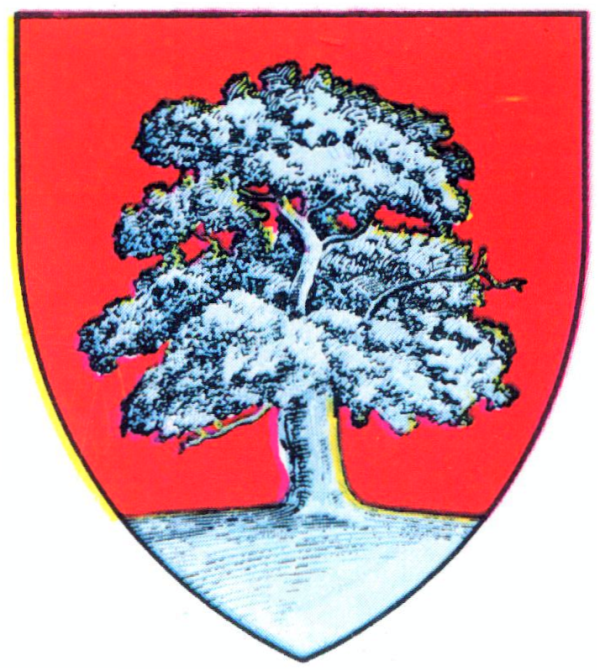
- Coat of arms

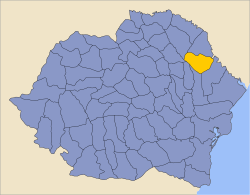
- Country: Romania
- Historical region: Bessarabia
- Capital city (Reședință de județ): Chișinău
- Established: 1925 (first time); 1941 (second time)
- Ceased to exist: 1938 (first time); 1944 (second time)

Area
  - Total: 4,181 km^{2} (1,614 sq mi)

Population (1930)
  - Total: 419,621
  - Density: 100.4/km^{2} (259.9/sq mi)
- Time zone: UTC+2 (EET)
  - Summer (DST): UTC+3 (EEST)

Lăpușna County was a county (Romanian: județ) in the Kingdom of Romania between 1925 and 1938 and between 1941 and 1944.

== Geography ==
The county was located in the eastern part of Greater Romania, in the center of the historical region of Bessarabia. Currently, the territory of the county is entirely part of the Republic of Moldova. The county was bordered by the Soviet Union to the east, the counties of Orhei to the north, Bălți to the north-west, Iași and Fălciu to the west, Cahul to the south-west and Tighina to the south.

== Administration ==
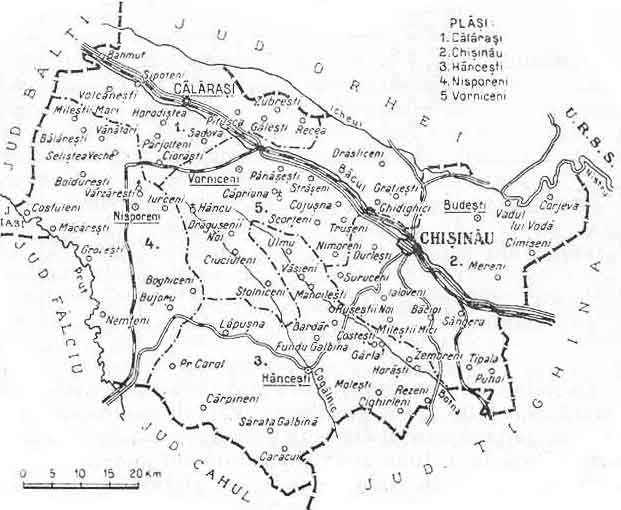
Map of Lăpușna County as constituted in 1938.

The county consisted of five districts (plăși):

1. Plasa Călărași, headquartered at Călărași
2. Plasa Chișinău, headquartered at Chișinău
3. Plasa Hâncești, headquartered at Hâncești
4. Plasa Nisporeni, headquartered at Nisporeni
5. Plasa Vorniceni, headquartered at Vorniceni

The county contained two urban localities: Chişinău (the county seat, with the status of the municipality, the second largest city of Greater Romania after Bucharest) and Călărași-Târg (with the status of urban commune or town).

== History ==
After the Union of Bessarabia with Romania in 1918, the county belonged to Romania, which set up the county formally in 1925.

After the 1938 Administrative and Constitutional Reform, this county merged with the counties of Tighina, Cetatea Albă and Orhei to form Ținutul Nistru.

The area county of the county was occupied by the Soviet Union in 1940 and became part of the Moldavian SSR. The area returned to Romanian administration as the Bessarabia Governorate following the Axis invasion of the Soviet Union in July 1941. A military administration was established and the region's Jewish population was either executed on the spot or deported to Transnistria, where further numbers were killed. As the Soviet Union's offensive pushed the Axis powers back, the area again was under Soviet control. On September 12, 1944, Romania signed the Moscow Armistice with the Allies. The Armistice, as well as the subsequent peace treaty of 1947, confirmed the Soviet-Romanian border as it was on January 1, 1941. The area of the county, along with the rest of the Moldavian SSR, became part of the independent country of Moldova.

== Population ==
According to the census data of 1930, the county's population was 419,621, of which 77.8% were ethnic Romanians, 11.9% Jews, 7.1% Russians, as well as other minorities. From the religious point of view 86.1% of the population was Eastern Orthodox, 12.1% Jewish, as well as other minorities.

=== Urban population ===
In the year 1930, the county's urban population was 119,672, of which 41.2% were ethnic Romanians, 37.3% Jews, 16.6% Russians, 1.2% Poles, as well as other minorities. From a religious point of view, the urban population consisted of 58.4% Eastern Orthodox, 37.7% Jewish, 1.5% Roman Catholic, as well as other minorities.
