= Bravicea =

- Village
- Location in Moldova
- Coordinates: 47°22′N 28°26′E
- Country: Moldova
- District: Călărași District

Population (2014 census)
  - Total: 3,112
- Time zone: UTC+2 (EET)
  - Summer (DST): UTC+3 (EEST)

Bravicea is a village in Călărași District, Moldova.

At the Bravicea school (500 students), one in four students has at least one parent working abroad; many live with their grandparents, some alone. Alexei Zatic has been the mayor of the village since 2007.

== Climate ==
Climate data for Bravicea (1991–2020, extremes 1952–2021)
Month	Jan	Feb	Mar	Apr	May	Jun	Jul	Aug	Sep	Oct	Nov	Dec	Year
Record high °C (°F)	17.7 (63.9)	21.9 (71.4)	27.6 (81.7)	32.1 (89.8)	36.1 (97.0)	38.9 (102.0)	40.7 (105.3)	40.7 (105.3)	37.7 (99.9)	33.0 (91.4)	24.9 (76.8)	18.6 (65.5)	40.7 (105.3)
Mean daily maximum °C (°F)	1.7 (35.1)	4.1 (39.4)	10.0 (50.0)	17.5 (63.5)	23.5 (74.3)	27.1 (80.8)	29.1 (84.4)	29.0 (84.2)	23.0 (73.4)	16.1 (61.0)	8.8 (47.8)	3.2 (37.8)	16.1 (61.0)
Daily mean °C (°F)	−1.8 (28.8)	−0.1 (31.8)	4.5 (40.1)	11.0 (51.8)	16.6 (61.9)	20.3 (68.5)	22.1 (71.8)	21.4 (70.5)	16.0 (60.8)	10.2 (50.4)	4.8 (40.6)	−0.2 (31.6)	10.4 (50.7)
Mean daily minimum °C (°F)	−5.1 (22.8)	−3.8 (25.2)	−0.2 (31.6)	5.1 (41.2)	9.9 (49.8)	13.9 (57.0)	15.6 (60.1)	14.6 (58.3)	10.1 (50.2)	5.2 (41.4)	1.6 (34.9)	−3.2 (26.2)	5.3 (41.5)
Record low °C (°F)	−34.8 (−30.6)	−28.9 (−20.0)	−25.8 (−14.4)	−10.7 (12.7)	−2.0 (28.4)	2.5 (36.5)	6.5 (43.7)	2.0 (35.6)	−6.1 (21.0)	−9.5 (14.9)	−17.5 (0.5)	−30.0 (−22.0)	−34.8 (−30.6)
Average precipitation mm (inches)	34 (1.3)	30 (1.2)	37 (1.5)	42 (1.7)	59 (2.3)	78 (3.1)	71 (2.8)	50 (2.0)	51 (2.0)	42 (1.7)	41 (1.6)	37 (1.5)	573 (22.6)
Average precipitation days (≥ 1.0 mm)	7	6	7	7	8	8	8	5	6	5	5	7	78
Average relative humidity (%)	81	80	75	67	65	68	69	69	73	76	82	83	74
Source 1: NOAA
Source 2: Serviciul Hidrometeorologic de Stat (extremes, relative humidity)

== Gallery ==
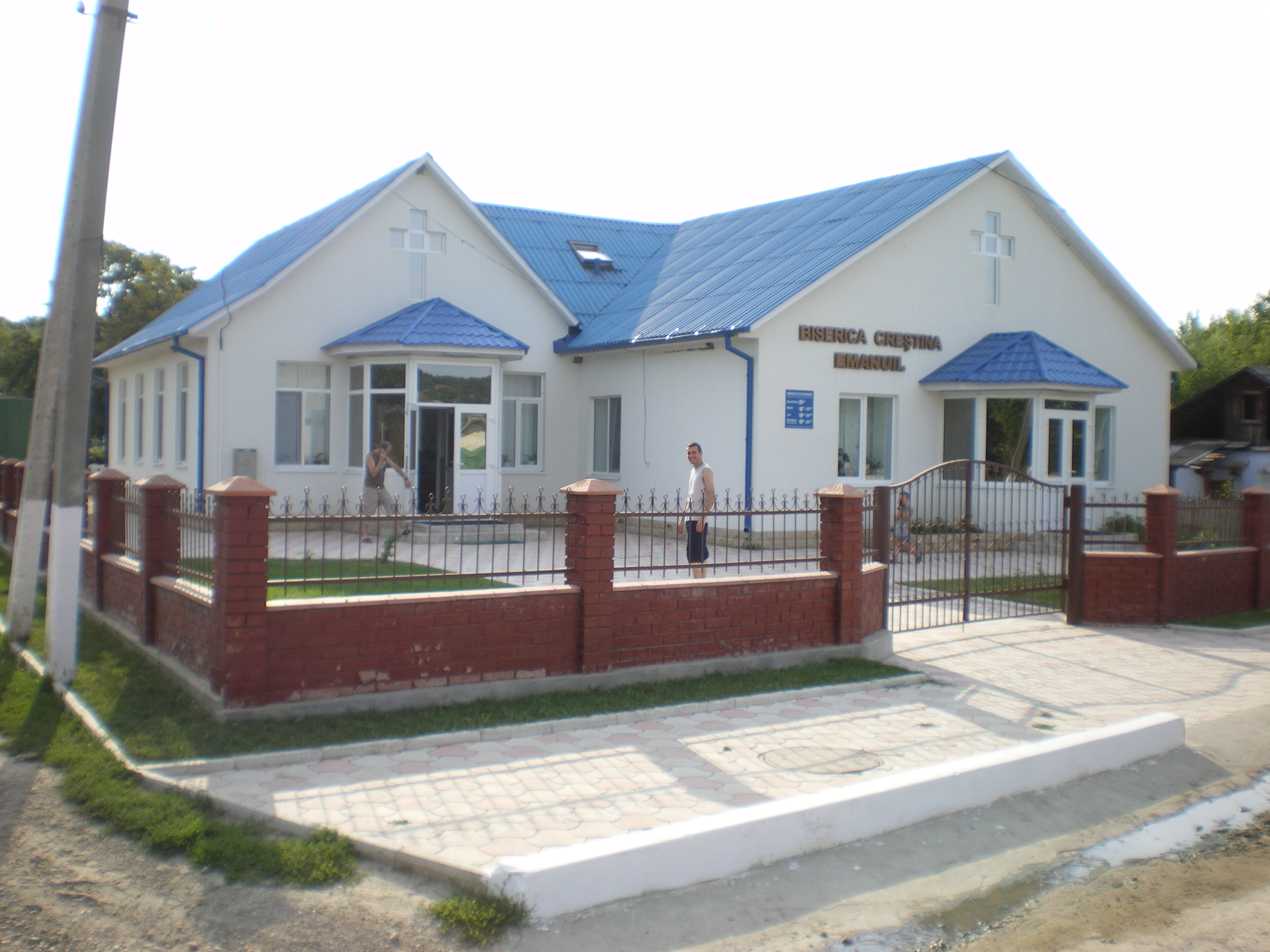

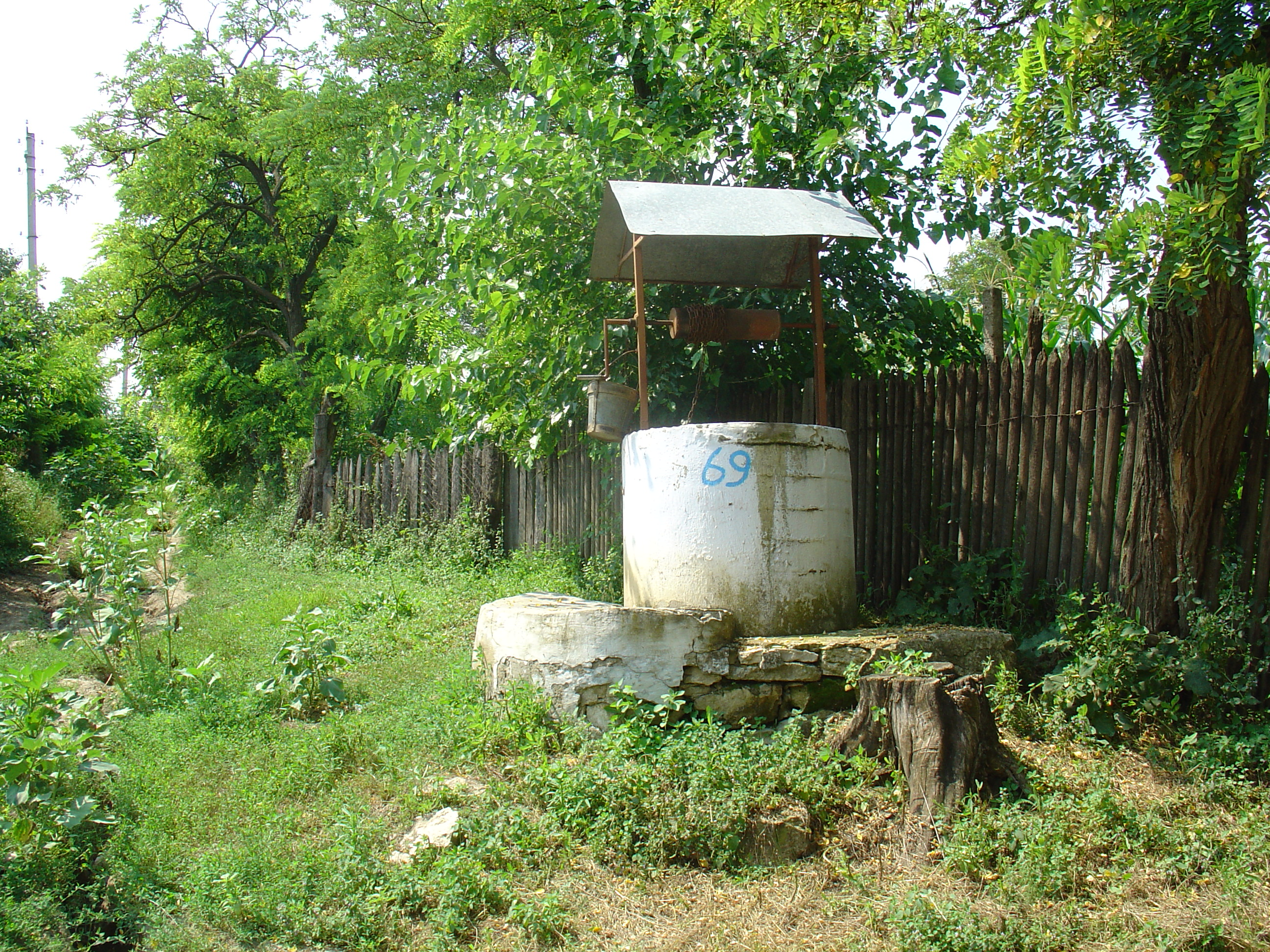

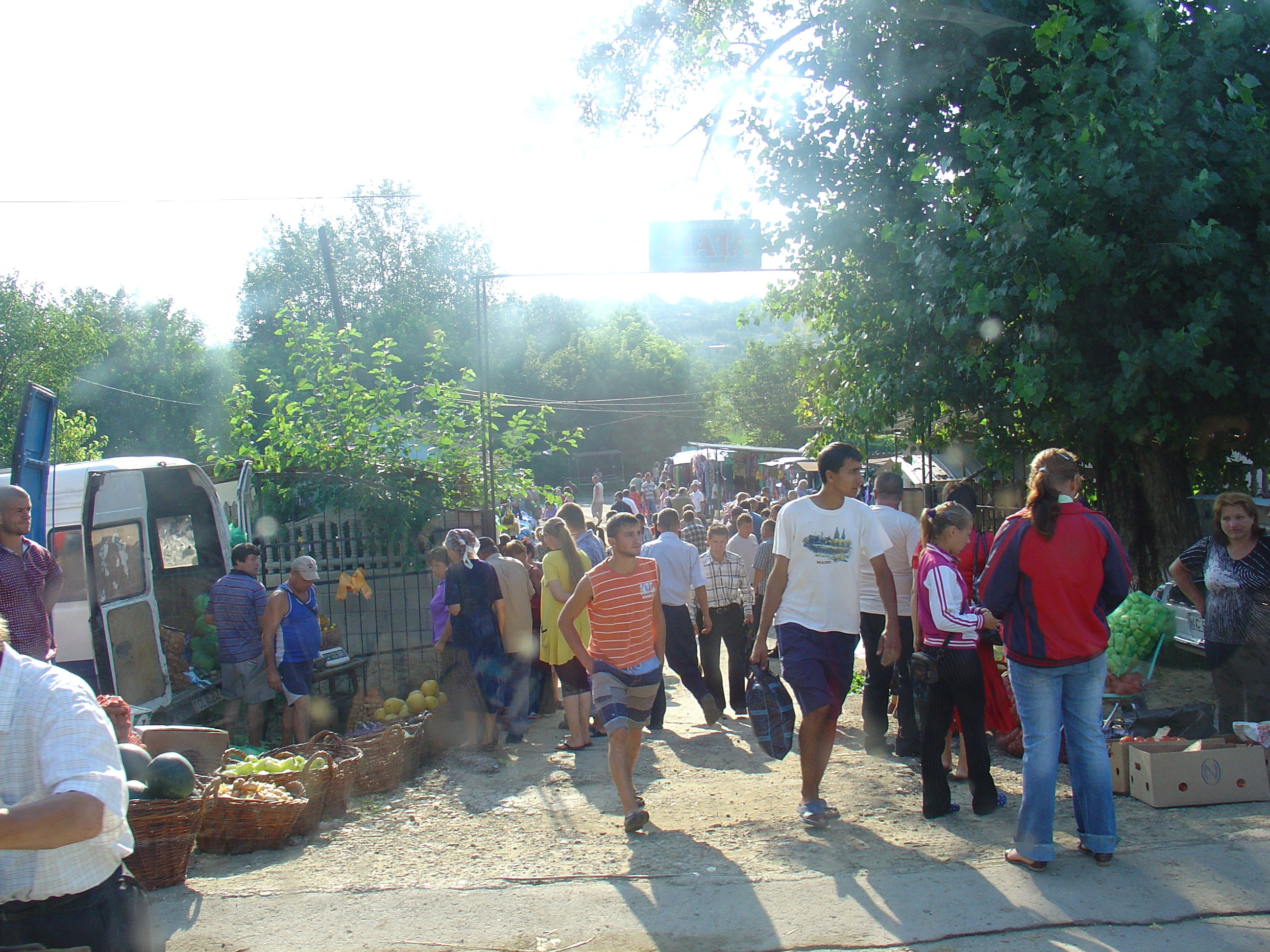
