= History of the Jews in Chișinău =

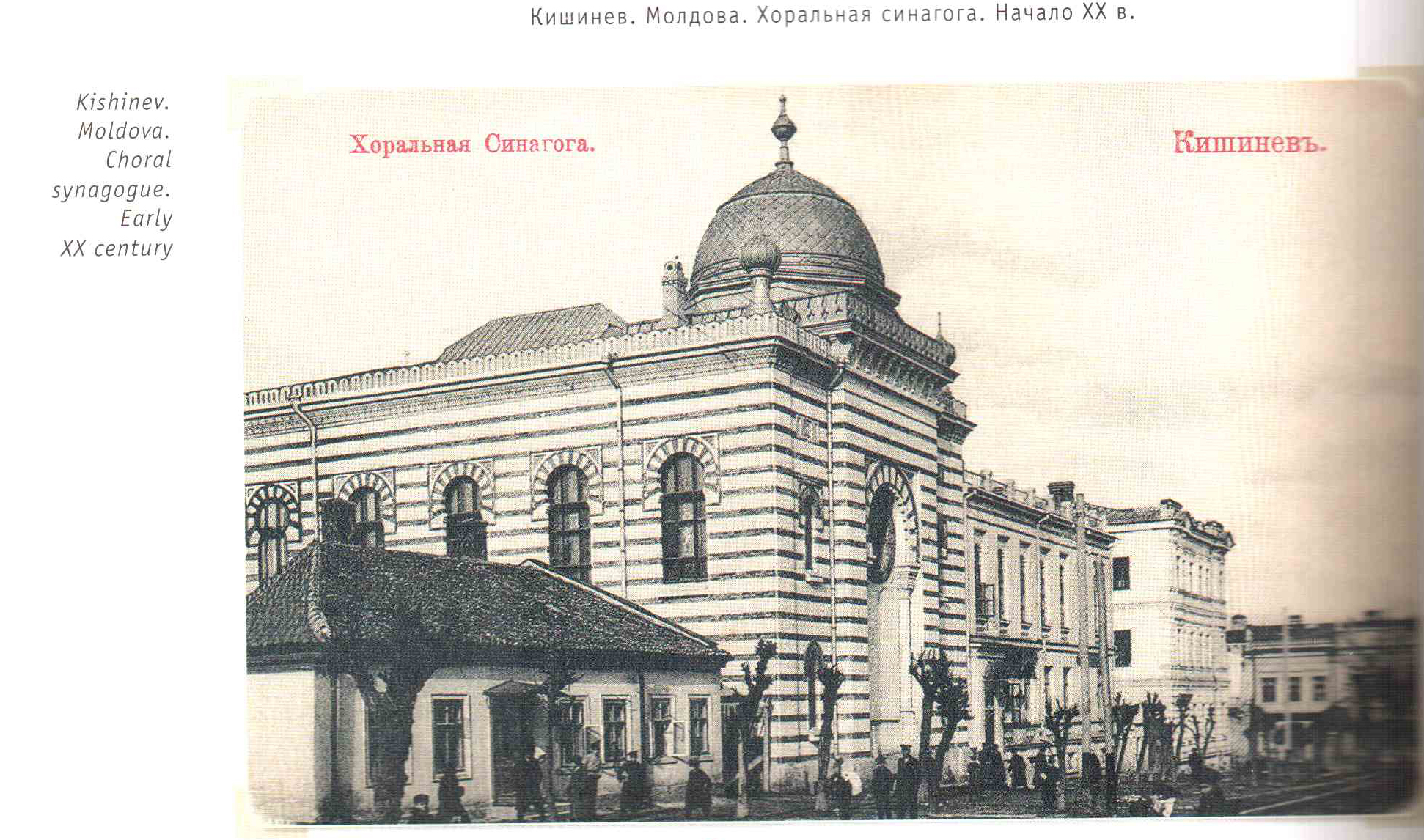
The Chișinău Choral Synagogue, 1913.

The history of the Jews in Chișinău dates to the early 1700s, when Chișinău (then known as Kishinev) was located first in Moldavia and later from 1812 onwards in the Bessarabia region of the Russian Empire. Chișinău is now the capital city of Moldova and is the center of the country's Jewish population. As of 2022, around 10,000 of the 15,000 Moldovan Jews reside in Chișinău.

== History ==
Chișinău (Keshenev in Yiddish) was historically part of Moldavia. In 1812, the region was annexed by the Russian Empire and became known as Bessarabia. The earliest Jewish presence in Chișinău dates back to the early 18th century. By 1774, Jewish people were 7% of the total population of Chișinău. In 1774, a Jewish burial society was founded in the city with 144 members. A cemetery was established in the early 19th century.

=== Kishinev pogrom ===
The Kishinev pogrom began on Easter Sunday, April 19, 1903. It was triggered by a news story in the only daily paper in the city, the antisemitic Russian language paper "Bessarabets" ("The Bessarabian') stating that a young boy had been murdered by Jews for using his blood for Passover (an example of the antisemitic blood libel trope). Local commentators say that this pogrom had been planned by the Russian authorities. An estimated 1,500 to 2,000 rioters launched a brutal assault against the Jewish quarter of Kishinev and their 50,000 residents. Mobs committed extreme acts of vandalism, plundering, murder, mutilation and rape, sparing marked Christian homes. The police and the 5,000 soldats stationed in the city let them do. The violence continued until finally the Minister of Interior ordered the dispersal of the mob on April 20 and a martial law on April 21. The pogrom resulted in 49 Jewish deaths, 495 injuries, 2,000 people left homeless and 2.5 million rubles in property damage. The Kishinev pogrom by its atrocity brought the word pogrom to the world stage, generating international expressions of indignation, including in the U.S.A.. It also deeply impacted the Jewish literature, with for instance a poem "In the City of Slaughter" based on the pogrom survivors' testimonies written by the famous Hebrew poet Hayim Nahman Bialik. The pogrom plaid a significant role in convincing Russian Jews to leave Russia for the West and for the land of Palestine.

=== The Holocaust ===
According to Dr. Avigdor Schachan, who wrote a book about the Transnistrian ghettos, and was himself brought up in the Bessarabian part of the present-day Chernivtsi Oblast of Ukraine, about 2,000 northern Bukovinian and 4,000 Bessarabian Jews were deported by the Soviet authorities to the Soviet east in June 1941. From 1941 to 1942, 120,000 Jews from Bessarabia, all of Bukovina, and the Dorohoi county in Romania proper, were deported by the Romanian authorities to ghettos and concentration camps in Transnistria, with only a small portion returning in 1944. The number of Jewish deportees to Transnistria sent there in 1941 who reached the latter province included 110,033 people, including 55,867 from Bessarabia, 43,798 from Bukovina, 10,368 from Dorohoi; out of these, 50,741 still survived by September 1, 1943. A further 4,000 Chernivtsi Jews were deported to Transnistria in June 1942. According to the Romanian gendarmerie, on September 1, 1943, 50,741 Jewish deportees survived in Transnistria, including 36,761 from Bukovina, including Dorohoi County (historically a part of the Old Kingdom of Romania, but administratively a part of Bukovina at that time), and 13,980 from Bessarabia. According to the statistics from the office of the Romanian prime minister of November 15, 1943, by province of origin from Romania and of county of residence in Transnistria, in the latter area there were 49,927 Jewish deportees who had survived, including 31,141 from Bukovina (without Dorohoi County, but including Hotin County), 11,683 from Bessarabia (without Hotin County), 6,425 from Dorohoi County, and 678 from the rest of Romania. According to the foremost Israeli scholarly study on the Holocaust by Leni Yahil, almost 60,000 Jewish deportees survived in Transnistria. According to the Encyclopedia of the Holocaust, 55,000 to 60,000 of the Jewish deportees to Transnistria survived the Holocaust. Another estimate of the total number of Bessarabian Jews who survived the deportations to Transnistria was 20,000, which also indicates that a large majority of the deportees died in Transnistria. The ones who died did so in the most inhuman and horrible conditions. (In the same ghettos and camps there were many Jews from that region as well, responsibility for whose death lies on the Romanian authorities that occupied it in 1941–44.) According to Wolf Moskovich, Professor of Russian and Slavic Studies at the Hebrew University of Jerusalem, in the article "Bessarabia", in The YIVO Encyclopedia of Jews in Eastern Europe, "Only a third of the deported Jews survived Transnistria." According to Wolf Moskovich in the same article, "In all, some 100,000 Bessarabian Jews perished during World War II." According to the Yad Vashem database, 60,732 Jews whose names are listed who had lived in Bessarabia before the war were killed during World War II, while 133 died indirectly in relation to the Holocaust.

Wolf Moskovinch wrote about the Holocaust in Chisinau: "In the first days following the German attack on the Soviet Union, many of Kishinev’s 70,000 Jews became victims of the intensive aerial bombardment of the city. Thousands escaped to the east. The returning Romanians showed no mercy to Bessarabian Jews, considering them to be Communists and Russian sympathizers. When the Romanians entered Kishinev on 16 July 1941, they staged a pogrom that continued for several days, and then established a ghetto with more than 11,000 prisoners, some of whom were murdered in the following months; indeed, 837 Jews were executed at the city cemetery. On 4–31 October 1941, the remaining Jews were deported to Transnistria in several groups, followed in May 1942 by the last about 200 Jews deported from the city. On May 20, 1942, 204 Jews from Chisinau were deported to Transnistria, while on July 10, 1942, other 27 Chisinau Jews were deported to Transnistria; the total number of Jews deported by train from Chisinau to Transnistria in 1942 was 231. Few Jews from Kishinev survived the camps." According to the Yad Vashem database, 5,987 Jews who were living in Chisinau were killed in the city. Among the Jews who lived in Chisinau before the war, Yad Vashem has a list of 16,522 who were evacuated to the Soviet east in 1941. The 1941 deportation of the city's Jews (and of Bessarabian Jews as a whole) to Transnistria, which was done by peasant carts and on foot in 1941 (unlike in the case of the Jews of southern Bukovina, Chernivtsi and Dorohoi, which was done by train) reduced its Jewish population from 11,388 in the fall of 1941 to 177 in 1943; a large majority of the deportees died according to Jean Ancel. On May 20, 1942, 204 Jews from Chisinau were deported to Transnistria, while on July 10, 1942, other 27 Chisinau Jews were deported to Transnistria; the total number of Jews deported from Chisinau to Transnistria in 1942 was 231. The number of Jews from Chisinau (some of whom were Jewish only according to the definition of the Romanian authorities, such as converts to Christianity) who lived in Chisinau in late 1943 was 177. In a July 18, 1941, memorandum to Romania's military dictator Ion Antonescu, the National Peasants' Party leader Iuliu Maniu protested in two paragraphs against the massacres of Bessarabian and northern Bukovinian Jews as well as the Iasi pogrom. Iuliu Maniu, the National Peasants' Party leader, condemned the deportations of Jews to Transnistria and he intervened to Ion Antonescu so that the latter would stop the deportations. On March 14, 1944, Romania's military dictator Ion Antonescu allowed the repatriation of all the Jews deported to Transnistria.

The number of Jews whose names are known who lived in Chisinau before the war who died in the Holocaust was 16,530 according to the Yad Vashem database. The number of Jews whose names are known who lived in Chisinau before the war who died in the Transnistrian city of Balta was 86 according to the Yad Vashem database. The number of Jews whose names are known who lived in Chisinau before the war who died in the Transnistrian city of Bershad was 6 according to the Yad Vashem database. The number of Jews whose names are known who lived in Chisinau before the war who died in the Transnistrian city of Odessa was 300 according to the Yad Vashem database. The number of Jews whose names are known who lived in Chisinau before the war who died in the Transnistrian concentration camp of Bogdanovka was 81 according to the Yad Vashem database. The number of Jews whose names are known who lived in Chisinau before the war who died in the Transnistrian city of Mogilev-Podolski was 24 according to the Yad Vashem database. The number of Jews whose names are known who lived in Chisinau before the war who died in the Transnistrian concentration camp of Domanivka was 63 according to the Yad Vashem database. For more information on the Holocaust in Transnistria, including on the fate of the Jewish deportees from Bessarabia and Chisinau, see History of the Jews in Transnistria.

=== Post-Soviet era ===
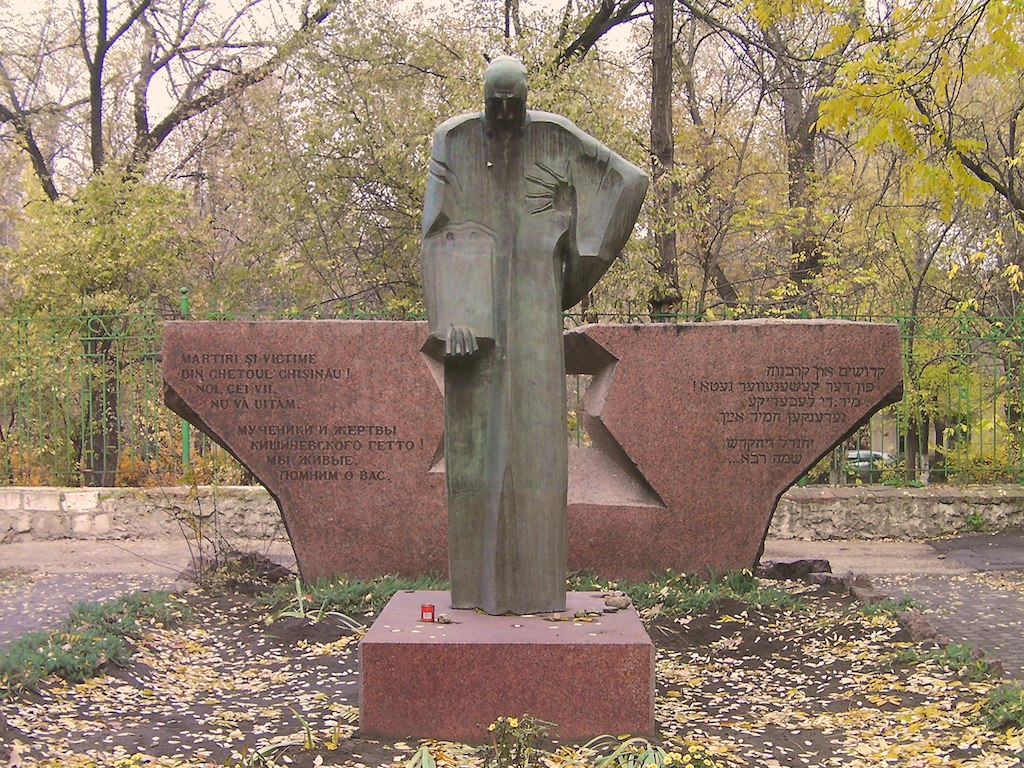
Holocaust Memorial, Chișinău

Since 1991, following the collapse of the Soviet Union, many Moldovan Jews have made aliyah to Israel or have emigrated to Western countries such as the United States. The population of Moldovan Jews is disproportionately elderly, with between a quarter to half of the community being elders.

Chabad maintains a synagogue in Chișinău. Agudath Israel, led by Rabbi Pinchas Zaltsman, operates the Torat Emet yeshiva.

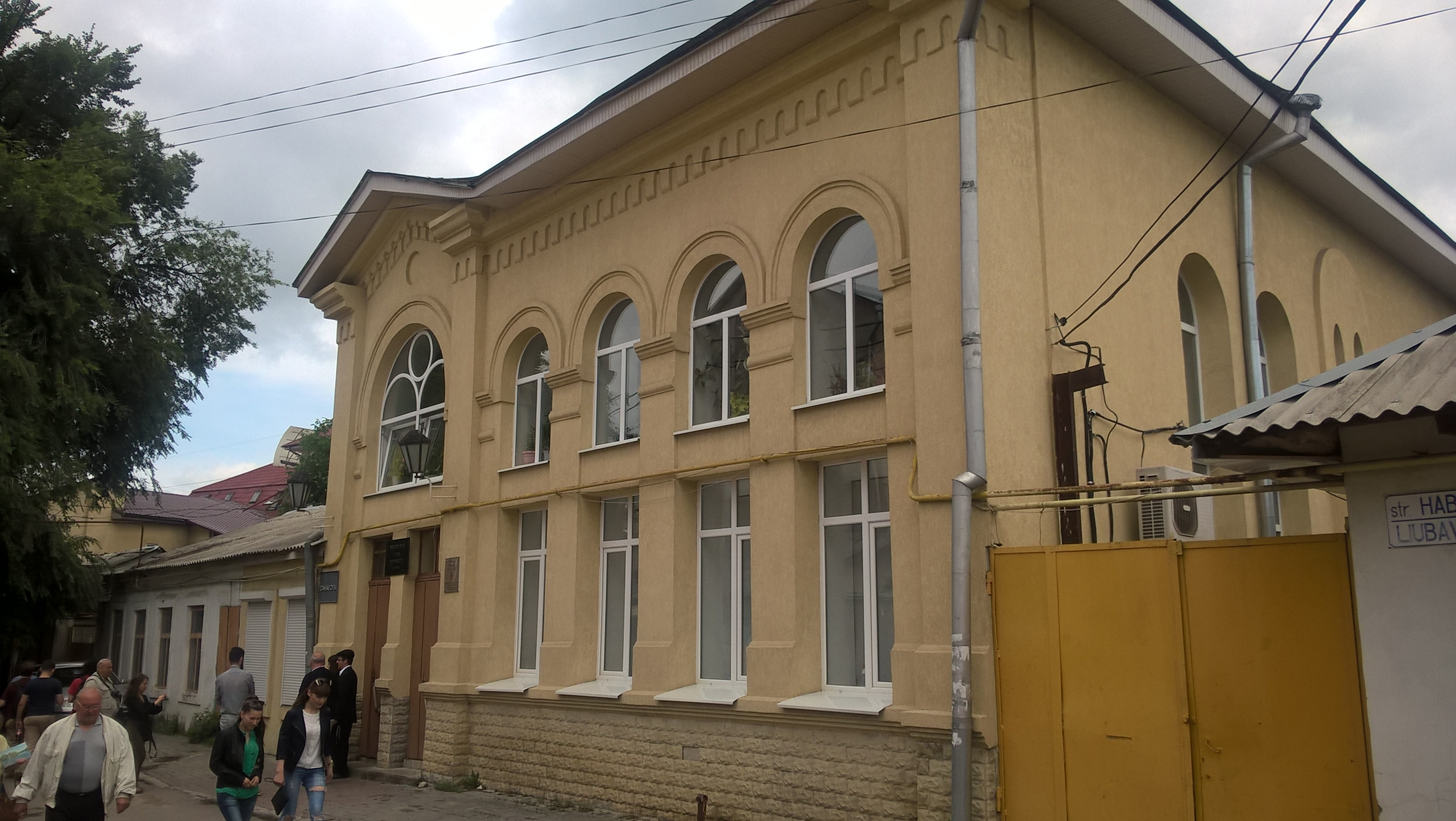
Glassmakers' Synagogue, Chișinău

In 2022, Ukrainian-Jewish refugees found refuge in Chișinău's four main synagogues, including the Sinagoga Sticlarilor (Glassmakers' Synagogue).

== Notable Jewish people from Chișinău ==
- Abram Anikst, Russian economist and revolutionary, People's Commissar for Labor of the Ukrainian Soviet Socialist Republic and Deputy People's Commissar of Labor of the Russian Socialist Federative Soviet Republic
- Olga Anikst, Russian revolutionary and Soviet educator, organizer of vocational education in the Russian SFSR, and the founder and first rector of the Moscow State Linguistic University
- Olga Bancic, a Romanian communist activist known for her role in the French Resistance.
- Abraham Baratz, a Romanian–French chess master.
- Isaac B. Bersuker, a Soviet-Moldоvan-American theoretical physicist and quantum chemist.
- Alexandr Bilinkis, a Moldovan businessman, public and diplomatic figure, and philanthropist.
- Samuel Bronston, a Bessarabian-born American film producer, film director, and a nephew of Leon Trotsky.
- Isaak Bubis, a Moldovan Soviet engineer and architect.
- Marc Chirik, a communist revolutionary who co-founded the International Communist Current.
- Yitzhak Coren, an Israeli politician who served as a member of the Knesset for Mapai and the Alignment.
- William F. Friedman, a US Army cryptographer who ran the research division of the Army's Signal Intelligence Service (SIS) in the 1930s.
- Alexander Frumkin, a Russian/Soviet electrochemist.
- Dennis Gaitsgory, a professor of mathematics at Harvard University.
- Marat Gelman, a Russian collector, gallerist, and an op-ed columnist.
- Jeff Gitelman, a Grammy-nominated record producer, musician and songwriter.
- Izso Glickstein, a naturalized American cantor (hazzan).
- Aleksandr Goldenweiser, a Soviet and Russian pianist, teacher and composer.
- Sarah Gorby, a French contralto singer.
- Julius Isserlis, a Russian pianist and composer.
- Eliahu Itzkovitz, a Moldovan/Romanian-born Israeli assassin.
- Ira Jan, a painter and writer.
- Joseph Joanovici, a French Jewish merchant of scrap metal who supplied both Nazi Germany and the French Resistance.
- Katia Kapovich, a Russian poet now living in the United States.
- Boris Katz, an American research scientist.
- Abe Katzman, a Klezmer violinist, bandleader, composer, and Brunswick Records recording artist.
- David Kaushansky, a Soviet lawyer.
- David Kessler (actor), a prominent actor in the first great era of Yiddish theater.
- Nathaniel Kleitman, a Bessarabian-born American physiologist and sleep researcher.
- Jacob Knaani, a Moldavian born, later Israeli, lexicographer.
- Gary Koshnitsky, a Bessarabian-born Australian chess master.
- Jacob M. Landau, a Professor Emeritus in the Department of Political Science at the Hebrew University of Jerusalem.
- Boris Leskin, a Soviet and American film and theater actor.
- Avigdor Lieberman, a Soviet-born Israeli politician.
- Haia Lifșiț,
- Moissaye Marans, a Bessarabian-born American sculptor.
- Shmuel Merlin, a Revisionist Zionist activist, Irgun member and Israeli politician.
- Grégoire Michonze, a Bessarabian-born Russian-French painter.
- Lewis Milestone, a Russian-American film director.
- Sacha Moldovan, a Russian-born American expressionist and post-impressionist painter.
- Ilya Oleynikov, a Russian comic actor and television personality.
- Nina Pekerman, an Israeli athlete who competes in triathlon and Ironman Triathlon competitions.
- Mendel Portugali, one of the leading figures in the Second Aliyah and a founder of the Hashomer movement.
- Oleg Reidman, a Moldovan politician serving in the Parliament of the Republic of Moldova.
- Boris Rosenthal, a character actor and operetta lyricist in the Yiddish theater.
- Joe Rosenthal (sculptor), a Romanian-born Canadian sculptor.
- Itzhak Shum, a retired Israeli football player and manager.
- Abner Tannenbaum, a Russian-born Jewish-American Yiddish writer and journalist.
- Zlata Tkach, a Moldovan composer and music educator.
- Svetlana Toma, a Soviet actress.
- Marina Tauber, a Member of the Parliament of the Republic of Moldova.
- Anna Tumarkin, a Russian-born Swiss academic and first woman professor of philosophy at the University of Bern.
- Alexander Ulanovsky, a chief illegal "rezident" for Soviet Military Intelligence (GRU) in the USA.
- Abram Vaysbeyn, a Romanian-born Soviet and Moldovan architect.
- Dina Vierny, an artists' model who became a singer, French art dealer, collector and museum director.
- Zev Vilnay, an Israeli geographer, author and lecturer.
- Maria Winetzkaja, an American mezzo-soprano opera singer.
- Iona Yakir, a Red Army commander.
- Avraham Yaski, an Israeli architect.
- Chaim Yassky, a physician and medical administrator in Jerusalem.
- Mark Zeltser, a Soviet-born American pianist.
- Sam Zemurray, an American businessman who made his fortune in the banana trade.

== See also ==
- History of the Jews in Bessarabia
- History of the Jewish people in Moldova
- History of the Jews in Transnistria
- History of the Jewish people in Romania
- Bessarabia
- Chișinău Choral Synagogue
- Bogdanovka concentration camp
- Domanivka
- Bershad
