= Alcalay =

Alkalay is a surname. Notable people with the surname include:

- Albert Alcalay (1907–1976), American artist
- Ammiel Alcalay (born 1945), American poet
- Luna Alcalay (1928–2012), Croatian-Austrian musician
- Milos Alcalay (born 1956), Venezuelan diplomat
- Reuben Alcalay (1917–2008), Israeli author
