= Reuben Alcalay =

Israeli lexicographer and author

- ראובן אלקלעי
- Born: 1907; Jerusalem, Ottoman Empire
- Died: 1976 (aged 68–69); Jerusalem, Israel
- Occupations: Lexicographer, author
- Writing career
- Notable works: Complete English-Hebrew Dictionary (1961), Complete Hebrew-English Dictionary (1965)

Reuben Alcalay (Hebrew: ראובן אלקלעי; 1907 in Jerusalem – 1976 in Jerusalem) was an Israeli lexicographer and author of the most comprehensive English-Hebrew-English dictionary, which expanded the dictionaries of Ben-Yehuda (Ben-Yehuda Dictionary), Avraham Even-Shoshan (Even-Shoshan Dictionary), Judah Even Shemuel (Kaufmann), Meir Medan, Harry Torczyner (Tur-Sinai), and Jacob Knaani.

His Complete English-Hebrew Dictionary (1961, 2,150 pages) aimed to contain all the modern Hebrew terms decided upon by the Hebrew Language Academy, and thousands of other new coinages from the Hebrew press literature. The first edition received a three-page review in the magazine of the American Jewish Congress in 1964. The companion volume, Complete Hebrew-English Dictionary, (מילון אנגלי עברי שלם) was published in 1965.

The dictionary contains entries and translations without pronunciation or examples. It is numbered by column rather than page.
