= Izso Glickstein =

Russian–American cantor (1889–1947)

Izso G. Glickstein
- Iczek Glückstein
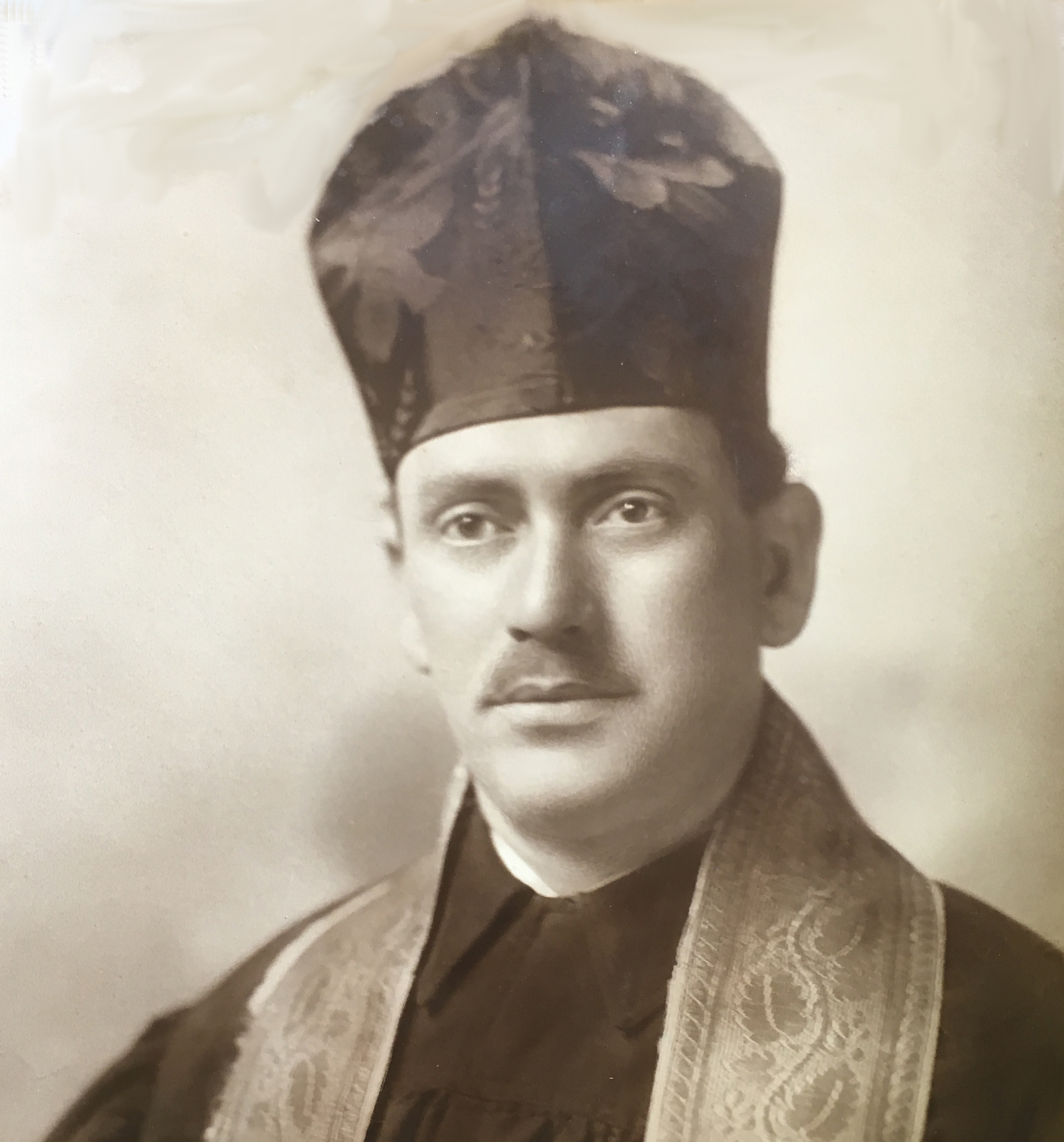
- Glickstein in cantorial robe
- Born: September 20, 1889; Kishinev, Bessarabia, Russia
- Died: April 17, 1947 (aged 57); Roxbury, Massachusetts, US
- Education: Franz Liszt Academy of Music (1913)
- Occupation: Cantor / Hazzan
- Years active: 1895–1947
- Spouse(s): Gizella Hochmann (1916–c. 1923); Ida Denholtz (1925–1947)
- Children: 3

Izso G. Glickstein was a fourth-generation Russian-American cantor or hazzan (September 20, 1889 – April 17, 1947). Hungarian: Iczek Glückstein. (Other last names: Gleuckstein, Glueckstein. Other first names: Izzo, Isidore, Isadore, Iczek, Isaak, Isaac, Yitzchak, Yitzchokl; other middle names: Garai, Garay, Gary.) Glickstein immigrated from Hungary to the United States through Ellis Island on May 4, 1923. He became a naturalized citizen on June 7, 1928.

Glickstein was a cantor, ranked with Cantor Josef "Yossele" Rosenblatt. He served as Chief Cantor at multiple synagogues including Europe's largest, the Great Synagogue or Dohány Street Synagogue of Budapest. Glickstein served for nearly 25 years at Leonard Bernstein's childhood synagogue Mishkan Tefila in Roxbury. Bernstein described Glickstein as a "fabulous cantor" and his "favorite cantor." He hosted radio programs on Boston's WNAC to popularize Hebrew music. He performed in hundreds of concerts, was the President of the New England Cantor's Association, and made multiple recordings of cantorial music.

A movie called My Grandfather's Prayers was made about Glickstein and his granddaughter, which premiered on January 25, 2020. Two videos were made about his cantorial music. Short biographies were published in 1923 and 1924, and a larger one in 1933.

== Early life and lineage ==
Izso G. Glickstein was born on September 20, 1889, in Kishinev, Russia (now Chișinău, Moldova). He was the oldest son of Gittel (née Paskar) and cantor and rabbi Ezekiel Glickstein. Ezekiel was born in Hannopil, Russia (now in Ukraine). Ezekiel moved to Zhytomyr (also now in Ukraine) where he was an Orthodox cantor, and then to Kishinev for rabbinical education.

Izso Glickstein's earliest memory of wanting to become a cantor was listening to his grandfather, cantor Moshe Glickstein, chant ancient prayers at the Great Synagogue of Kishinev or the Chișinău Choral Synagogue. At an early age, Izso started singing in grandfather Moshe's choir. Izso recalled this as one of the greatest events in his life, and Izso came to be hailed by Moshe's congregation as a prodigy or "wonder child." It was also during this time that Izso heard the cantor Zaydl (Zeidel) Rovner (Jacob Samuel Maragowsky) sing when he visited the Great Synagogue of Kishinev. This is when Izso formed his aspiration to become a great cantor.

Izso's father Ezekiel had a cantorial post outside the city of Kishinev while he attended rabbinical school in Kishinev. Izso would sing both for his father's and his grandfather's congregations. For the High Holidays, both father and grandfather wanted Izso to sing at their synagogue. Izso preferred his grandfather's great synagogue over his father's small, remote synagogue. The dispute was resolved when Ezekiel offered to pay Moshe to let nine-year-old Izso sing at the Great Synagogue of Kishinev for the High Holidays.

Disputes over young Izso and his vocal talent broadened. Other synagogues wanted Izso to sing for their choirs, but Ezekiel refused. One cantor actually kidnapped Izso for the High Holidays. The raider came in the night and took him 20 kilometers away. Izso was returned after the festival along with candy, toys, and 200 rubles (a small fortune at the time).

Izso's cantorial lineage starts in Hannopil, where Haskel, Moshe, and Ezekiel were born and Haskel and Moshe were cantors. Hannopil was an important center of Hasidic Judaism, which is where Rabbi Dov Ber of Mezeritch and his son Avraham Ha-Malach (the Angel) lived. The Jewish population of Hannopil was exterminated during the The Holocaust, but a mausoleum remains where Dov Ber is buried. The Hasidic branch of Jewish practice had a significant influence on Haskel, Moshe, and Ezekiel.

Ezekiel graduated from rabbinical school in Kishinev in 1900 and sought a larger congregation and post. Sensing a rise in anti-semitic tensions in Kishinev, Ezekiel moved his family to Rákoscsaba, Hungary in 1900. (Ezekiel was right; the Kishinev pogrom erupted in 1903, killing or gravely injuring 140 Jews.) Izso was 11 years old when his family moved to Rákoscsaba. Ezekiel served as Orthodox rabbi, cantor, and dayan in Rákoscsaba. Later, Ezekiel immigrated to the United States where he was cantor and rabbi for an Orthodox community in Peabody, MA.

Izso Glickstein's cantorial lineage is summarized below, with details on his cantorial posts described at Chief Cantor Positions in Europe and Mishkan Tefila.

Izso G. Glickstein Cantorial Lineage
Generation	Given Name	Birth Year	Birth City	Cantorial Post	Branch
1st	Haskel	~1810	Hannopil, Russia (now Ukraine)	Hannopil	Hasidic
2nd	Moshe	~1830	Hannopil, Russia	Hannopil	Hasidic
2nd	Moshe	~1830	Hannopil, Russia	The Great Synagogue, Kisinev, Russia	Orthodox
3rd	Ezekiel	1859	Hannopil, Russia	Zhitomir (now Zhytomyr in Ukraine), Russia	Orthodox
3rd	Ezekiel	1859	Hannopil, Russia	Town outside Kishinev	Orthodox
3rd	Ezekiel	1859	Hannopil, Russia	Rákoscsaba, Hungary	Orthodox
3rd	Ezekiel	1859	Hannopil, Russia	Peabody, Massachusetts, US	Orthodox
4th	Izso	1889	Kishinev, Russia	Celldömölk, Hungary	Neolog
4th	Izso	1889	Kishinev, Russia	Dohány Street Synagogue, Budapest, Hungary (aka The Great Synagogue, Tabac Temple)	Neolog
4th	Izso	1889	Kishinev, Russia	Győr Synagogue, Hungary (city of Raab, Hungary in German)	Neolog
4th	Izso	1889	Kishinev, Russia	Temple Mishkan Tefila, Boston, Massachusetts, US	Conservative

== Education ==
Izso Glickstein and his younger brothers all began their studies in the Talmud and learned Hebrew melodies in the oral tradition from their father Ezekiel and grandfather Moshe when they were young. Glickstein entered public school in Rákoscsaba and sang in the Orthodox Rumbach Street Synagogue for the cantor Jacob Bachman. But at the age of 12, Glickstein's voice changed and he stopped singing. Instead, he concentrated on high school and Talmudic studies in a Budapest yeshiva. By the age of 18, Glickstein had graduated from both forms of education at the top of his class.

At the age of 19 (1908), Glickstein's voice returned as a tenor and he began singing again. He was sponsored by a wealthy Budapest woman to study voice in Nitra, Slovakia for a year. The following year, at age 20 (1909), a wealthy merchant living in Rákoscsaba sponsored Glickstein's attendance for a year at the Franz Liszt Academy of Music (then, the National Academy of Music) in Budapest. During his first year, Glickstein won an additional three-year scholarship from the school and completed four years of study (1909 to 1913). During his tenure at the Liszt Academy, Glickstein studied under Jenő Hubay as did Fritz Reiner and Joseph Szigeti, another prodigy.

== Early career ==
Glickstein graduated from the Liszt Academy in 1913 with an annual scholarship at the Budapest Opera House. This was a distinction for a 24-year-old graduate. He took the position and performed in several operas in Berlin. He was offered the position of lead tenor.

"When my father found out that I was thinking of an operatic career, there was a tragic scene, He came to Budapest with tears in his eyes. He thought that the worst thing that could happen to him was that his son would go on the stage, I pleaded with him, but he insisted that if I could be an opera singer then I surely could be a famous cantor, and that if I ... continued in the opera he would disown me ..."

Glickstein could not bear the risk of losing his family, so he declined the lead tenor position at the Budapest Opera House.

Not long after Glickstein left the opera, World War I erupted. He was caught up in the quick mobilization and served as a chaplain in the Austro-Hungarian army. He was active on the Piave for eight months, but was seriously wounded in the leg by an Italian artillery shell fragment. His injury on the Piave aligns with the early Battles of the Isonzo in 1915.

While recovering from his war wounds in Rákoscsaba, Glickstein met Gizella (also Gizela) Hochman. Their Jewish marriage was in Rákoscsaba on June 25, 1916. Marriage was important professionally for Glickstein; unmarried cantors were frowned upon in Hungarian synagogues.

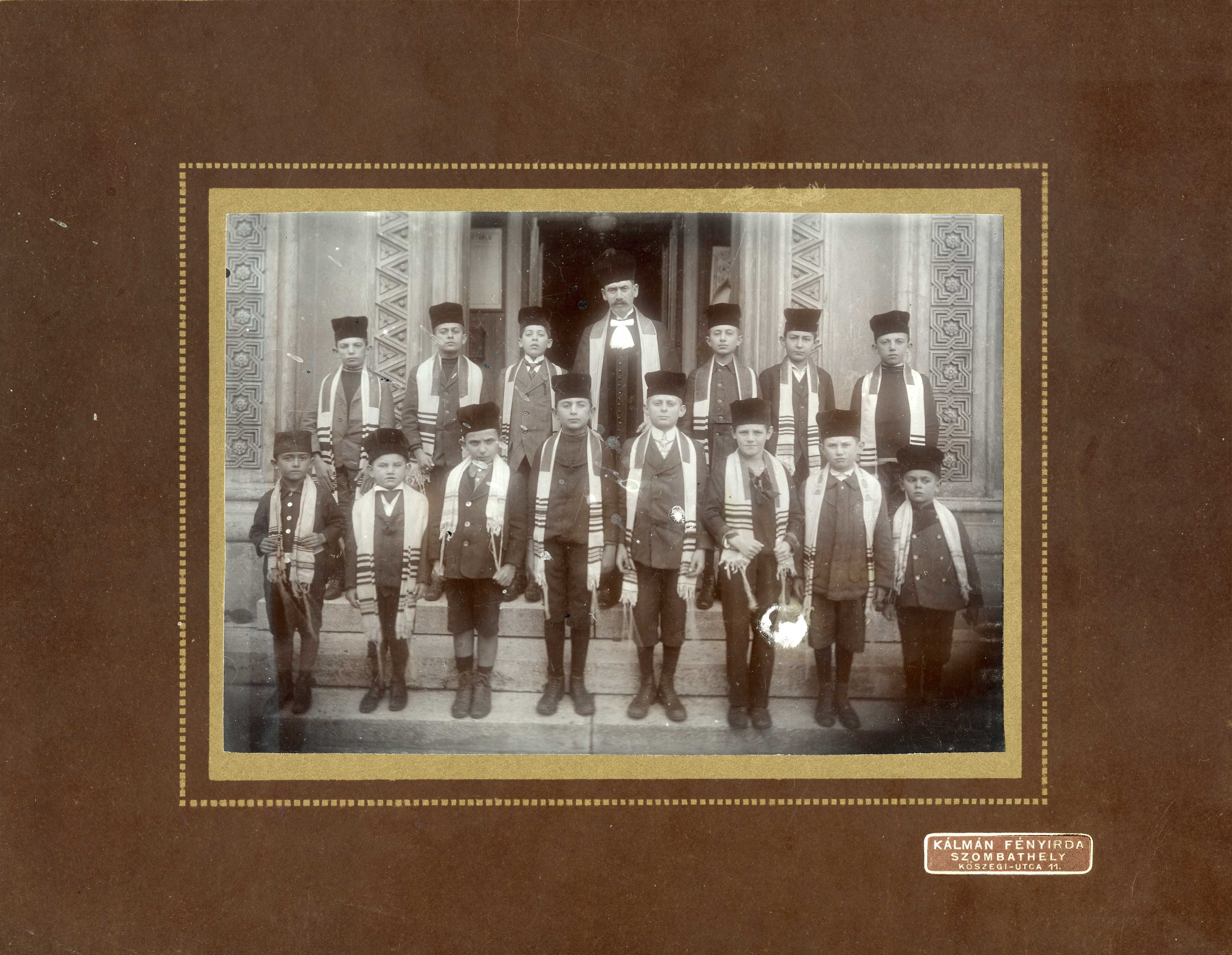
Cantor Izso Glickstein (top center) with students in Celldomolk between 1916 and 1920.

== Chief cantor positions in Europe ==
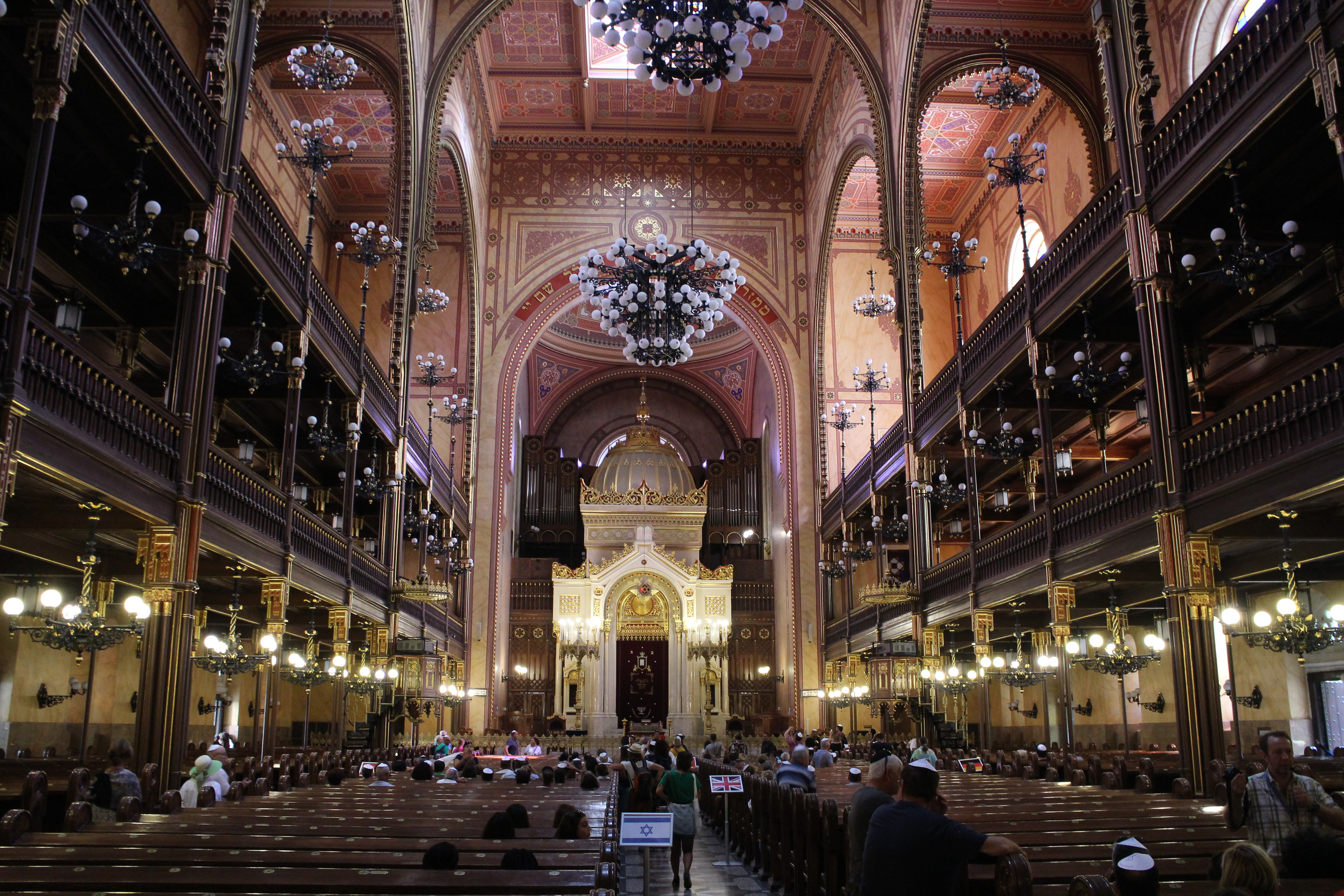
Dohány Street Synagogue interior

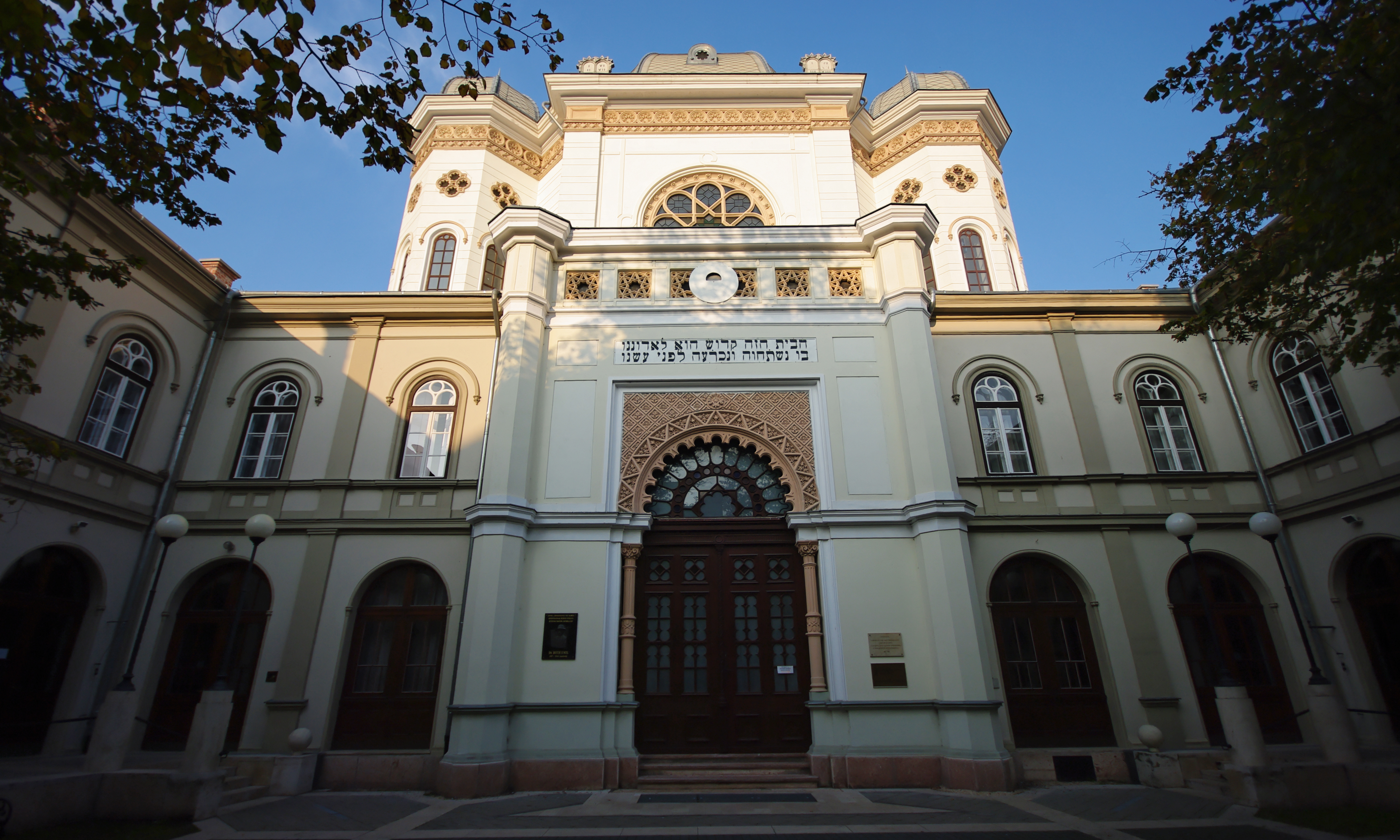
Győr Synagogue

=== Celldömölk ===
Glickstein's first cantorial post came in 1916 at Celldömölk, Hungary at a Neolog synagogue where he also taught Yeshiva students. Two years later, Izso and Gizella fled Celldömölk after the first phase of the White Terror struck on August 23, 1919. Soldiers broke into the synagogue, captured the rabbi, desecrated the synagogue, and robbed, raped, and murdered congregants.

=== Dohány ===
Izso and Gizella fled to Budapest. Izso became uber cantor at the Dohány Street Synagogue or the Great Synagogue in 1920. Dohány was the center of Neolog Judaism and the largest synagogue in Europe, seating 3,000 worshipers. This was the most prestigious cantorial post in all of Europe at the time. The post was open because Zevulun (Zavel) Kwartin had left for the United States the previous year.

=== Győr ===
Glickstein took the position of Chief Cantor at the Győr Synagogue (Raab Temple in German) in 1922. The Győr congregation was well-funded. They allowed Glickstein to give concerts in Vienna and other large European cities.

== Mishkan Tefila ==
Mishkan Tefila was founded as Mishkan Israel in 1858, and then as Mishkan Tefila in a merger with Shaarei Tefila in 1894. In 1907 Mishkan Tefila moved to Moreland Street and embraced what became known as Conservative Judaism. In 1910 the congregation installed Herman H. Rubenovitz as its rabbi, a graduate of Jewish Theological Seminary.

=== Preparation and recruitment ===
Mishkan Tefila was among a group of congregations in the United States that created an era of Jewish music called the Golden Age of the Cantor. The process of change at Michkan Tefila was slow for Rubenovitz. In 1914, his small congregation agreed by a vote of 67 to 54 to allow organ music and a mixed choir. With these changes, membership and funding started to grow.

In October 1922, Mishkan Tefila broke ground on a new 2,000-seat synagogue on Seaver Street in Roxbury. This would become the largest synagogue in New England for decades, complete with a large organ second only to Symphony Hall.

By 1923, the congregation approved and funded the recruitment of a European cantor. In the spring of 1923, Rubenovitz scouted Europe's synagogues, found Glickstein in Győr, and invited him to audition in Boston. The offer was countered by Győr's president with a paid two-year sabbatical, but Glickstein decided to immigrate to the United States. Glickstein auditioned at Mishkan Tefila on July 21 and was elected cantor on August 9, 1923.

Glickstein's appointment at Mishkan Tefila was front-page news in Boston's The Jewish Advocate. He was described as the "famous chief cantor of Temple Tabakgasse, Budapest, the largest synagogue in Hungary."

=== Early success ===
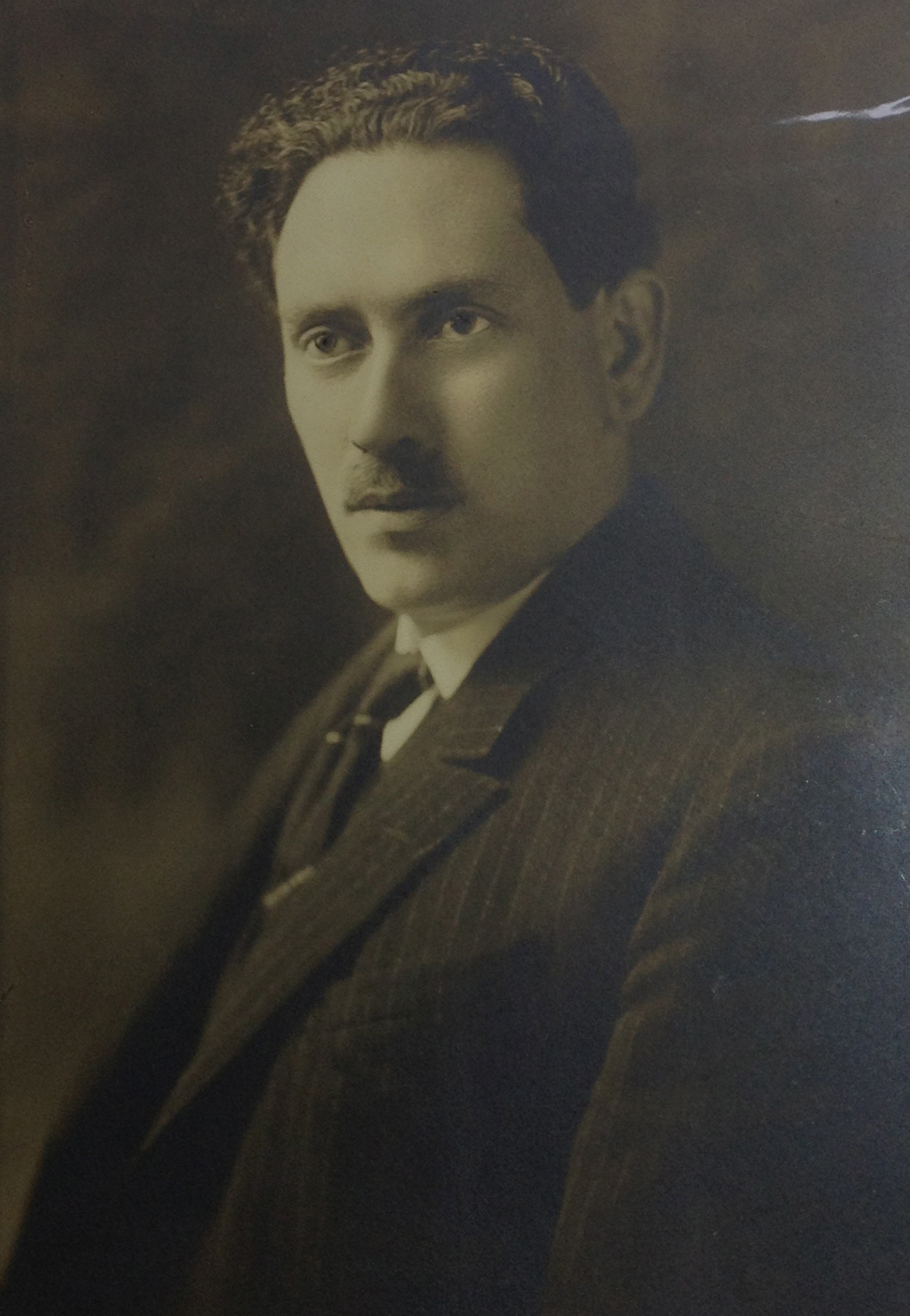
Izso Glickstein in Boston, Massachusetts, 1923 (age 34)

Glickstein's was promoted in a front-page article and large High Holy Days ads with his photo. Then he was booked on the first ever radio broadcast of Hebrew music on Boston's WNAC. He sang at a neighboring temple, where he received a "most enthusiastic ovation" and his voice was described as "sweet and it is powerful." Then a "very large crowd was present" for High Holidays services at Mishkan Tefila.

After the 1923 High Holidays, Glickstein was elected instructor of the Cantors' Seminary along with Pinhas Minkowsky. He was featured in the Three World Famous Cantors tour across New England with Minkowsky and Isadore Adelsman. And he sang again in a WNAC Hanukkah broadcast.

=== High Holy Days ===
Glickistein had an impact on the growth and popularity of Mishkan Tefila. He was regularly featured in its High Holy Days services. Starting in 1925, the new 2,000-seat Temple is filled. Glickstein directed music and the choir from 1923 to 1928.

- 1923: as described above.
- 1924: Glickstein was the featured vocalist, assisted by choir of 16.
- 1925: Glickstein officiated and sang in the new Mishkan Tefila temple. The choir size was 24. The new organ was advertised as "the largest and finest in any Temple in the country." Every seat was filled and many were turned away.
- 1926: Glickstein was featured in ads along with a highly trained choir and a new organ (second in size only to Symphony Hall).
- 1927: Glickstein prepared new musical scores and rehearsed with an enlarged choir. The "crowd taxed the capacity of the synagogue." A "record crowd" attended. Standing room only.
- 1928: The "largest Jewish temple was taxed to capacity." Overflow attended services in Mishkan Tefila Hall.
- 1929: A record crowd attended Yom Kippur services "at the largest of all the new temples."
- 1931: Glickstein was featured as "our inimitable Cantor" in a page-one High Holidays ad.

=== Special events at Mishkan Tefila ===
Mishkan Tefila offered high-profile events featuring Glickstein that were often open to the general public.

- Thanksgiving Day service with mayor Malcolm Nichols speaking.
- Meeting featuring speaker Maurice Samuel.
- Collaborative musical program with two other temples.
- Art exhibit.
- Jewish Brotherhoods meeting.
- New chapel dedication.
- Veterans of Foreign Wars program.
- Officiates Late Friday Evening programs.
- Evening program supporting the Zionism movement.
- Thanksgiving day service hosting six Jewish congregations.
- Service for Associated Jewish Philanthropies.
- Meeting hosting governor Frank G. Allen.
- New liturgical pieces composed by Zavil Silbert.
- Ludwig Lewisohn talk.
- Israel Goldstein talk.
- Rashi celebration
- Peace Day service.
- National Goodwill and Brotherhood week.
- Patriotic Service program.
- Memorial service for Franklin D. Roosevelt.
- Navy Memorial service.

== High profile public performances ==
Glickstein sang, chanted, or led prayers in the following public performances.

- 1924 Adath Jeshurun: Minkowsky funeral, attended by thousands.
- 1925 Symphony Hall: Hebrew University celebration.
- 1925 Mishkan Tefila: Building dedication. All 2,000 seats are filled. Congregation described as "one of the largest Jewish congregations in this part of the country."
- 1925 Chelsea: Concert advertised as "One of the biggest musical events this season."
- 1926 Symphony Hall: Featured soloist to honor poet Hayim Nahman Bialik. Sings El Moleh Rohamin, Prayers for the Dead. Atttendees include Albert Einstein, Ruben Brainen, Nahum Sokolow, Vladimir Jabotinsky, Menachem Ussischkin, Chaim Weizman, and David Yellin.
- 1928: Toastmaster for Zavil Kwartin at Hebrew Community Center in Winthrop.
- 1929 Lawrence Colonial Theater: Principal soloist of Yiddish folk songs, Hebrew melodies, and classical music. "Every seat at the Colonial Theater is expected to be sold out."
- 1930 Mishkan Tefila: Chants prayers for thousands at David A. Lourie funeral. Crowd overflow onto steps and into nearby cars.
- 1932 Temple Ohabei Shalom: Dinner for Nahum Sokolow.
- 1936 Mishkan Tefila: Rubenovitz Silver Jubilee. Event included piano selections by Leonard Bernstein.
- 1941 Mishkan Tefila: Address by Eleanor Roosevelt. Record attendance.
- 1944 Copley-Plaza: Chants for fallen United Nations soldiers.
- 1944 Dorchester: Max Hamlin (Jewish labor leader) funeral with 1,500 in attendance.
- 1944 Symphony Hall: Sings self-composed piece for full capacity crowd in Let Freedom Ring musical pageant.
- 1944 Associated Jewish Philanthropies: Honor roll and plaque dedicated.

== Influence on Leonard Bernstein ==
Leonard Bernstein was eight years old (1926) when he moved from Lawrence to Boston and began to attend Mishkan Tefilah. As noted in several Bernstein biographies, Hebrew music was a central early influence. Since Glickstein was cantor in 1926, and Braslavsky did not join Mishkan Tefila until 1928, Glickstein was Bernstein's first major influence of high quality ancient Hebrew music. As Bernstein said of his early years in the synagogue:

"We had a fabulous cantor [Glickstein] who was a great musician and a beautiful man, very tall, very majestic. He would begin to sing the ancient tunes - they are not exactly melodies, because they are not really written down; they're traditional, handed down orally - and he had a tenor voice of such sweetness and such richness - with a dark baritone quality - and then the organ would start and then the choir would begin with its colors, and I just began to get crazed with choral music."

The Jewish Advocate reported in 1933: "Master Leonard Bernstein, son of Vice-President and Mrs. S. J. Bernstein, discovered by Cantor I. G. Glickstein to be an extraordinary talented young man with unusual musical abilities, will demonstrate and paraphrase a Chassidic tune on the piano." Glickstein had been a prodigy and recognized the same in Bernstein. Glickstein was also part of an intimate circle that included Bernstein's parents.

== Recognition ==
=== Positions of distinction ===
Glickstein was elected for multiple distinguished positions.

- Jewish Ministers and Cantors Association: New England representative, board member, president.
- HIAS: executive committee, board member.
- New England Zionist District: Officer, president.

=== Quotes praising Glickstein ===
- Glickstein is described as "... one of the leading Jewish singers in America, ranking with Josef Rosenblatt and others of equal prominence. He is in America less than two years and during that short time has become exceedingly popular with Jewish music lovers. He is in great demand as concertist throughout the country."
- Glickstein is described as "the new cantor with the golden voice ... His glorious voice seems even better, his standard of excellence for the choir is ever higher; his circle of admirers is growing ever larger ..."
- "Cantor Glickstein is one of the finest cantors ever heard in this city."
- "Cantor I. G. Glickstein of Temple Mishkan Tefila enthused the audience to the highest pitch with his golden voice."
- "A musical program, consisting of vocal numbers by the Temple Mishkan Tefila Quartet and Cantor G Glickstein, accompanied by Professor S. Braslavsky, were received with thunderous applause."
- "Cantor Itzo Glickstein of Temple Mishkan Tefila, Roxbury, one of the most talented and renowned cantors in the country, will be the featured soloist ..."
- "Cantor Glickstein was much applauded for his work in the solos."
- "Loud sobbing broke out during the impressive exercises, when, after the unveiling of the honor roll, the Hebrew chant for the dead was sung by Cantor I. G. Glickstein of Temple Mishkan Tefila, followed by taps for the five men who have died in the present struggle."

=== Events and articles in Glickstein's honor ===
- Jewish Culture Club.
- Palestine pilgrimage announcement, bon voyage dinner and sendoff, and return celebration.
- Biography and photo published in Boston Transcript.
- Reception upon return from second Palestine visit.
- 20th anniversary at Mishkan Tefila.

== Public service ==
Glickstein frequently served New England's Jewish community by singing at their events or attending their meetings.

=== Radio broadcasts ===
Glickstein sang on three Boston radio stations.

- WNAC.
- WLOE.
- WORL.

=== Charitable organizations ===
Glickstein performed for charitable events throughout New England.

- Bickur Cholim Association.
- Essex Institute.
- Halpern 25th Jubilee.
- Hebrew Free School.
- HIAS.
- Home for Aged.
- Long Island Hospital.
- Palestine Foundation Fund.
- Starving Jews in Uman.
- United Jewish Campaign.
- United Palestine Appeal.
- Women's Scholarship Association.

=== Jewish synagogues and organizations ===
Glickstein was a guest cantor or singer at the following Jewish synagogues and organizations in New England.

- Agudath Askenazin Temple.
- Agudath Israel.
- Amos Lodge of B'nai Brith, where he is a member.
- Atereth Israel Synagogue.
- Besserabian Society.
- B'nai Brith.
- Chai Odom Synagogue.
- Community Church of Symphony Hall.
- Congregation Agudath Achim.
- Congregation Beth Hamidrash Hagodol.
- Daughters of Israel.
- Frauen Verein Convalescent Home.
- Good Brothers Synagogue in Worcester.
- Hebrew Teacher's College.
- Home for Jewish Children.
- New England Cantors' Association.
- Ohel Jacob Synagogue in East Boston.
- Tremont Temple.
- United Synagogue of America.
- West End Jewish Community Center.
- Young Men's and Young Women's Hebrew Association of New England.

=== Zionist events ===
Glickstein performed at the following Zionist gatherings.

- Anti-Hitlerism.
- Balfouf declaration signing celebration.
- Brockton meeting on Palestine.
- Chelsea.
- New England Zionists.

=== Local meetings and entertainment ===
Glickstein performed at local meetings and for entertainment events.

- Elks Lodge.
- Ford Hall (later called Ford Hall Forum).
- Malden grand rabbi celebration.
- New England Cantors Association.
- People's Ort Federation.
- Portsmouth synagogue.

== Death announcements ==
After several months of illness in early 1947, Glickstein died on April 17, 1947. Local news outlets announced his death on page 1 and followed up on subsequent pages. The New York Times also carried an obituary.

=== The Boston Globe ===
- "Rev. Izso G. Glickstein, 55, cantor of Temple Mishkan Tefila for almost 25 years and noted interpreter of ancient jewish liturgy, died today at his home, 497 Warren st., Roxbury" (page 1).
- "One of the most active members of Greater Boston's Jewish community, he served for many years as president of the Jewish Ministers and Cantors Association of New England, chaplain at Long Island Hospital and served for a time as chaplain of Germania Lodge of Masons."
- "Noted for his interpretation of the ancient Jewish liturgy in keeping with the European tradition...Known in Greater Boston's Jewish community for his generosity and service in charitable causes..."
- "Twelve hundred persons attended funeral services for Cantor Izso G. Glickstein, 56, who died yesterday...There were eulogies by Rabbi Israel J. Kazis and cantor Leon Lange of New York."

=== The Jewish Advocate ===
- "Izso G. Glickstein, Cantor of Temple Mishkan Tefila for nearly a quarter of a century, passed away this morning at his home, 497 Warren street, Roxbury, after an illness of several months" (page 1).
- "The death of the beloved cantor is a great loss to a community he had served in many ways...In December of 1943 the Advocate Carnation, symbol of community esteem, was awarded Cantor Glickstein."
- "The Death of Cantor Izso G. Glickstein brings deep sorrow not only to his friends and admirers who appreciated his splendid musicianship, but to the general community which respected him for his kindness of heart and love for humanity."

=== The New York Times ===
- "Izzo Glickstein, cantor for twenty-five years at Temple Mishman [sic] Tefila and president of the Cantors Association of New England, died today at his home in suburban Roxbury. His age was 55. Before coming to this country, he was chief cantor in Budapest, Hungary."

Newspaper coverage of Glickstein's death was extensive across New England. For example: "Cantor Glickstein Dies in Boston" (Lynn, MA), "New England Cantor Association Head Dies" (North Adams, MA), and "Cantor Iszo Glickstein" (Portland, ME).

== Tributes ==
Multiple Jewish news outlets published tributes to Glickstein.

=== By Rabbi Herman H. Rubenovitz ===
Rubenovitz recruited Glickstein to America and worked with him for 25 years. He wrote in his tribute:

"It was the Spring of 1923 that I first met Cantor Glickstein...After a brief conversation...I realized that he was the man for us...

"My first impression was more than confirmed in the course of the years that followed. I was associated with Cantor Glickstein for nearly a quarter of a century and throughout this eventful period which marked the opening of our new Temple, the expansion of our activities, the assumption of leadership by our Congregation in all religious and common affairs, he and I, together with Professor Braslavsky in the choir loft, worked together steadfastly and harmoniously to make of our services the finest jewel in the diadem of Temple Mishkan Tefila.

"In Cantor Izso G. Glickstein, we had a man gifted with a voice of remarkable power, range and beauty, but these gifts of themselves would not have made him the great Cantor that he was. In addition, he had those qualities of mind and heart which made it possible for him to penetrate to the very soul and spirit of our traditional prayers, and to interpret these in a manner which thrilled, exalted and inspired all of us. His renditions of the chants sung in connection with the Opening of the Ark, and the taking out of the Scrolls, was unforgettable, as was his singing of the beautiful soul-stirring music of the Avoda during the Musaph Service on Yom Kippur day.

"At the time when our persecuted, tortured brethren from Germany came fleeing to the shores of America and during those dreadful years when the sun of European civilization suffered an eclipse, Cantor Glickstein worked faithfully with me to give the unfortunates every possible aid and comfort. May his soul be bound up in the bond of eternal life and his example serve as inspiration to his children, his family and kin."

=== By Rabbi Israel J. Kazis ===
Rabbi Kazis was the acting rabbi at Mishkan Tefila when Glickstein died. His tribute, in part:

"The passing of Cantor Izso G. Glickstein has left a deep void in Temple Mishkan Tefila and in the hearts of all who knew and loved him. He was a member of that great class of distinguished cantors whose interpretation of Jewish liturgical music added immeasurably to the beauty, meaning, and dignity of the religious service..."

"Cantor Glickstein gave of himself to every worthwhile cause in the community. He served as President of the Cantors Association in Boston for several terms, and was its honorary President at the time of his passing. He served as Chaplain of the Masonic Germania Lodge in Boston and as Chaplain of the Long Island Hospital. He was always ready to participate in the programs of the many organizations in our community. He thus served not only Temple Mishkan Tefila but the entire community..."

=== By Harry L. Katz ===
Harry Katz was the Boston publisher and editor of the weekly The Jewish World. Here is the first paragraph of his tribute:

"Within that unique Jewish tradition (unknown among other peoples) of the hazzan and sholiach zibbur as guide at public worship, Cantor Izso Glickstein stood. He brought new distinction to the traditional office. He placed the office of hazzan in a new setting, and developed its potentialities for the American congregation. Preserver and interpreter of the old, true to the ancient tradition and skilled in glorious bits of improvising and extemporizing a new arrangement as the spirit moved on, moulding a new thought-idiom into the traditional pattern and theme: Cantor Glickstein made the role of hazzan flexible and creative..."

== Personal life ==
While Glickstein recovered from the leg wound he sustained on the Italian front in World War I, he met and married Gizella Hochmann on June 25, 1916. Her father was Miksa Hochmann (born in Obuda, Hungary) and her mother was Maria Bruck (born in Pest, Hungary). The Hochmann family moved from Pest to Rákoscsaba with their daughter Gizella, and the wedding took place there (now District 17 of Budapest). The marriage made Glickstein more acceptable for an official cantorial post. At some point Gizella and Izso divorced: Izso declared he was single when he immigrated to the US in 1923, and Gizella's official last name was Hochmann when she married Arnold Lengyel in Budapest in 1933.

In June 1925, Izso Glickstein married Ida Denholtz (daughter of Joe Denholtz and Chava Paskar). Together they had three children: Helaine ("Honey") in 1926, Judith ("Judy") in 1927, and Mishel ("Mitch") in 1931. Glickstein served as Chief Cantor at Mishkan Tefila for almost 25 years until his death in 1947. To replace him, over 50 cantors from around the world were auditioned to replace him, and Wolf Garbarz was selected.

Glickstein's father, Ezekiel, moved from Hungary to the Boston area and settled in Peabody, MA, where he was a rabbi for an orthodox congregation for four years. Ezekiel died at Izso's home on October 11, 1928 at the age of 68. Glickstein's mother Gittel died on April 5, 1938, also in Glickstein's home.

Glickstein had three brothers in the US: Louis, Eugene, and Adolph. All three lived in the Boston area, as did his sister Esther (Glickstein) Landy. Dr. Louis H. Glickstein was born in Kishinev, Russia in 1894 and immigrated to the US in 1923. He was a cantor for High Holidays, a doctor of podiatry, and active in the Zionist movement along with Izso. He died in the Boston area in 1989. Esther (Glickstein) Landy was born in Kishinev, Russia in 1897, immigrated to the US in 1929, and married David Landy the same year. She died in 1991.

Eugene Glickstein was born in Rákoscsaba, Hungary in 1901 and immigrated to the US in 1923. He was a cantor and executive director at Mishkan Tefila. He moved to Portland, OR in 1954 and died there in 1977. Adolph Glickstein was born in Rákoscsaba, Hungary in 1903. In 1931 he was the youngest cantor in Boston. He was a cantor for the New England Branch of the Young People's League. Adolph substituted for Izso as cantor at Mishkan Tefila during his illness and after his death. Adolph died in 1981.

== Discography ==
Glickstein recorded two albums which were later reissued in cantor collections.

Original Recordings
Year	Label	City, State	Album	Artist	Song	Side	Digital Archive
1925	Victor Talking Machine Company	Camden, New Jersey	Tenor with Orchestra	Glickstein	B’rosh Hashonah	A (C-32940)	Discography of American Historical Recordings, UC Santa Barbara Library
1925	Victor Talking Machine Company	Camden, New Jersey	Tenor with Orchestra	Glickstein	Yaaleh Tachanunaynu	B (C-32941)	Discography of American Historical Recordings, UC Santa Barbara Library
1927	Colombia Phonograph Company	New York City	Hymn with Orchestra Accompaniment	Glickstein	Hashkiveno (Pt. 1) Min Hamaytzar	A (57011-F, 59972)	University of Wisconsin-Madison, Mills Music Library: Mayrent Collection of Yiddish Recordings
1927	Colombia Phonograph Company	New York City	Hymn with Orchestra Accompaniment	Glickstein	Hashkiveno (Pt. 2) Retze Vimnuchosaynu	B (57011-F, 59973)	University of Wisconsin-Madison, Mills Music Library: Mayrent Collection of Yiddish Recordings

Reissued Glickstein Recordings in Great Cantor Collections
Year	Label	City, State	Album	Artist	Song	Side	Track	Digital Archive
1967	Greater Recording Company	Brooklyn, New York	Masterworks of the Great Cantors	Glickstein	Hashkivenu	A	7	Recorded Sound Archives, Florida Atlantic University
1973	Greater Recording Company	Brooklyn, New York	In the Synagogue with the Great Cantors (Volume 4 of 5)	Glickstein	Retze Vimnuchosaynu	A	1	Recorded Sound Archives, Florida Atlantic University
1973	Greater Recording Company	Brooklyn, New York	In the Synagogue with the Great Cantors (Volume 4 of 5)	Glickstein	B’rosh Hashonah	A	2	Recorded Sound Archives, Florida Atlantic University
1973	Greater Recording Company	Brooklyn, New York	In the Synagogue with the Great Cantors (Volume 4 of 5)	Glickstein	Yaaleh Tachanunaynu	A	3	Recorded Sound Archives, Florida Atlantic University
1973	Greater Recording Company	Brooklyn, New York	In the Synagogue with the Great Cantors (Volume 4 of 5)	Glickstein	Min Hamaytzar	B	1	Recorded Sound Archives, Florida Atlantic University
