= Kaushansky =

Kaushansky (Kaushanski, Kauschansky, etc.) is a Bessarabian Jewish toponymic surname. Its meaning in Russian language is "somebody from Căușeni" (from the Russian spelling of the place name Kaushany; the place is now in Moldova). Notable people with the surname include:

- Baruch Kaushansky, birth name of Baruch Agadati, Israeli dancer, choreographer, and cinematographer
- David Kaushansky (1893–1950), Romanian and Soviet lawyer, legal scholar
- Kenneth Kaushansky, American medical doctor, hematologist
