= List of synagogues in Moldova =

This is a list of notable synagogues in Moldova.

== Chișinău ==
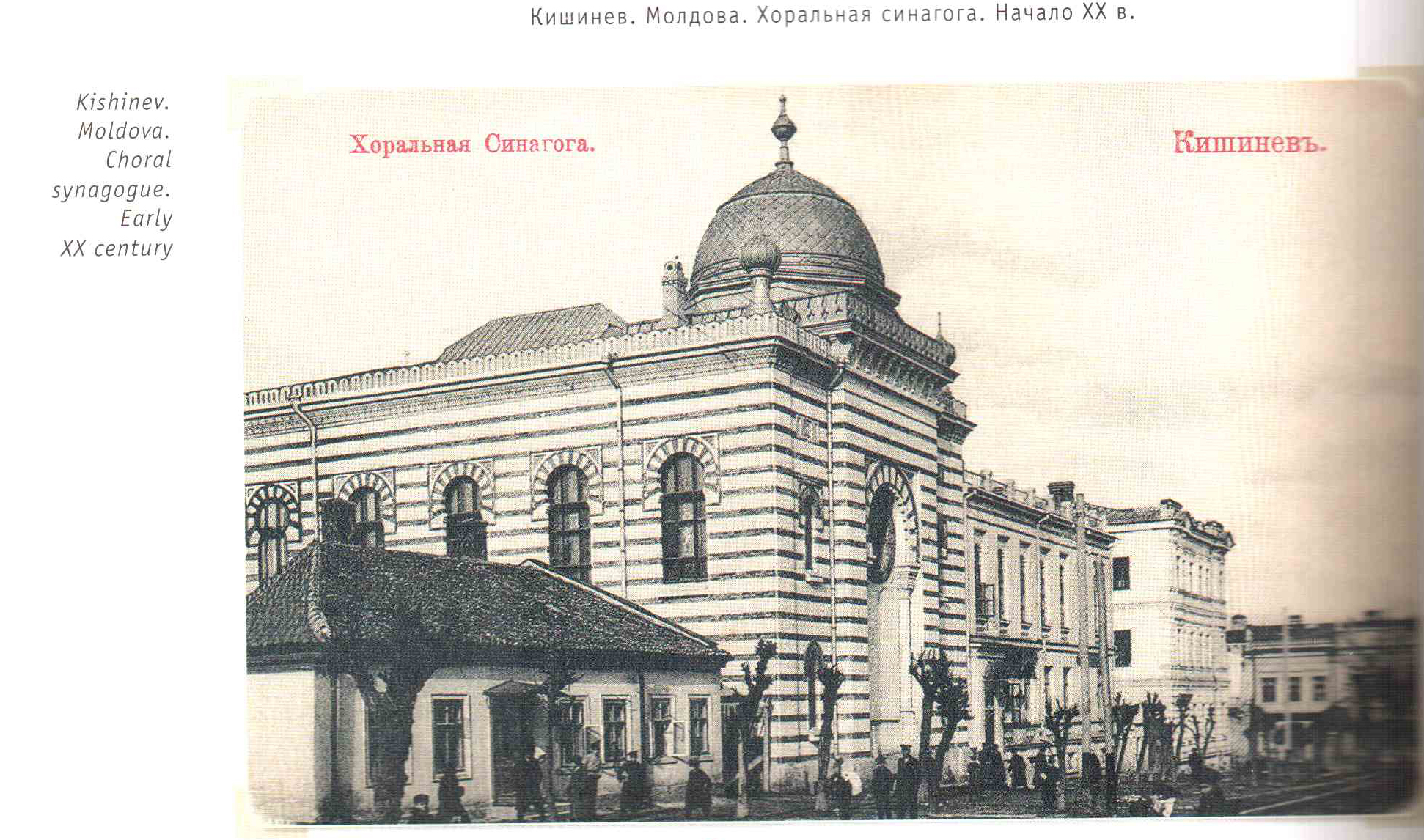
The former Chișinău Choral Synagogue, 1913

- Alte Shul Synagogue, Chișinău
- Central Synagogue Chabad, Chișinău
- Chișinău Choral Synagogue, Chișinău; repurposed as a theater in the 1950s
- Lemnaria Synagogue (Wooden Synagogue), Chișinău
- Sinagoga Sticlarilor (Glassmakers' Synagogue), Chișinău
- Synagogue Chofetz Chaim, Chișinău

== Orhei ==
- Orhei Synagogue, Orhei

== Soroca ==
- Sinagoga, Soroca

== Tiraspol ==
- Keren, Tiraspol
