= Jewish cemetery, Chișinău =

Jewish cemetery in Chișinău

Coordinates: 47°2′7″N 28°47′50″E

Chișinău Jewish Cemetery
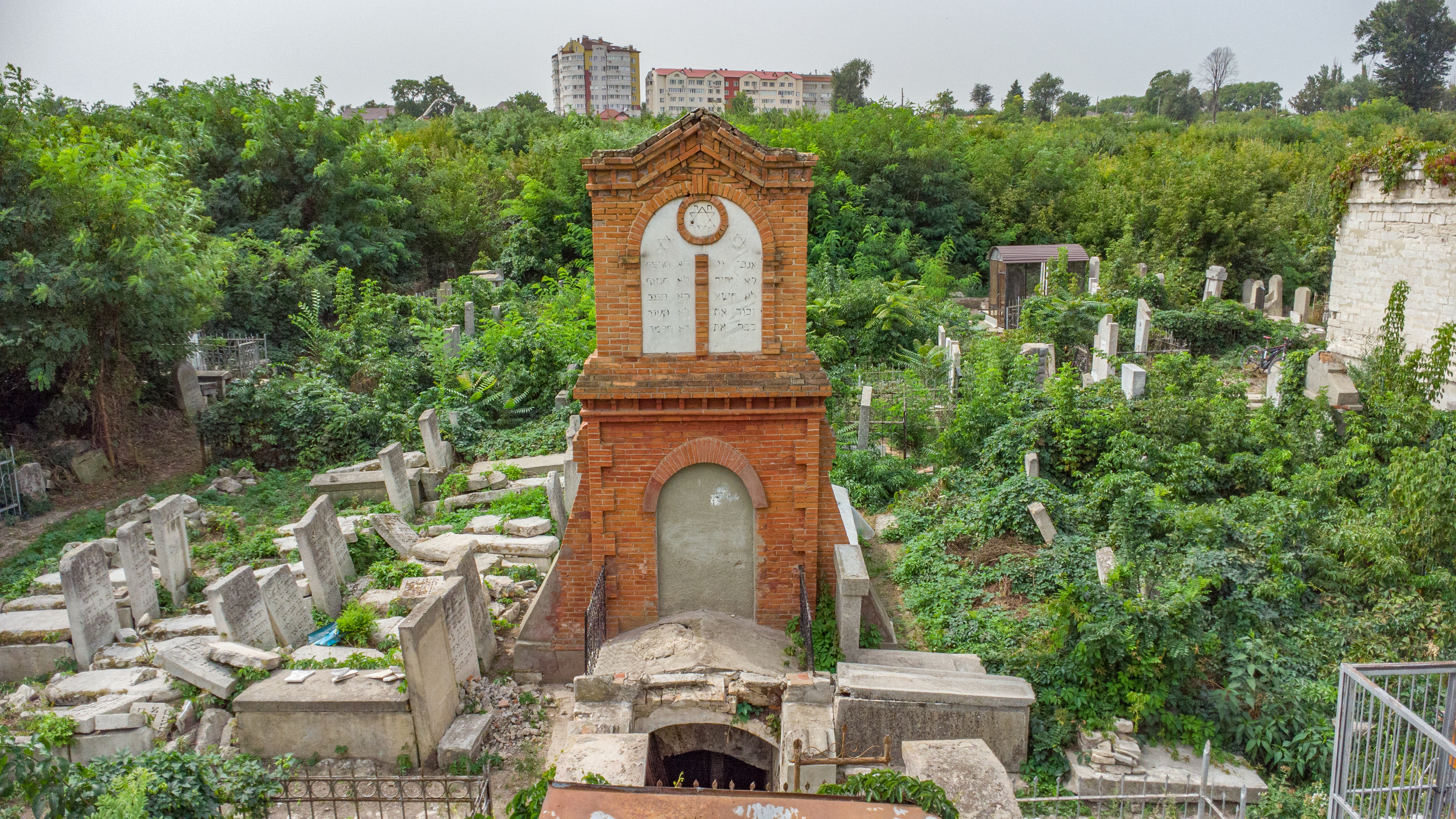
- Interactive map of Chișinău Jewish Cemetery

Details
- Established: 19th century
- Location: Chișinău, Moldova
- Type: Jewish cemetery
- Size: 100 ha
- No. of graves: 20,000

The Chișinău Jewish Cemetery is a Jewish cemetery in the Sectorul Buiucani of Chișinău, Moldova. It is situated on Milano Street and spans approximately 100 hectares and contains over 20,000 graves dating back to the 17th century. It features a variety of grave markers made from marble, granite, and other materials, and includes a Holocaust monument and historical mausoleums.

== History and description ==
Established in the early 19th century, the cemetery has played a crucial role in the Jewish community of Chișinău, which once constituted half the city's population by 1940. Historically, the site extended to include the "New" cemetery on Skulyanka, with significant portions repurposed in 1958 for urban development, including a market square and Park Alunelul.

== Victims of Chișinău Pogrom Monument ==
A memorial stone to the victims of Chișinău pogrom was erected 1993 in Alunelul Park, the former territory of the Cemetery.

== Beit Kaddishim ==
Beit Kaddishim is a historic funeral hall located within the Cemetery. Constructed in the latter half of the 19th century, this structure has endured through significant historical events, including damage from shelling during the World War II. Although the hall has experienced extensive neglect over the decades, resulting in the loss of part of its roof, its original interior decorations and dome have survived. It was restored with the support of the US Embassy in Moldova.

== Gallery ==
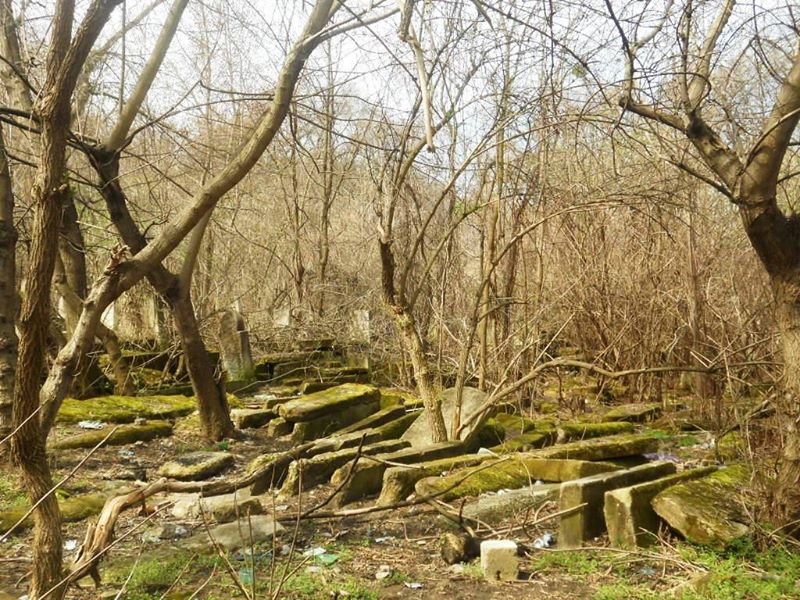

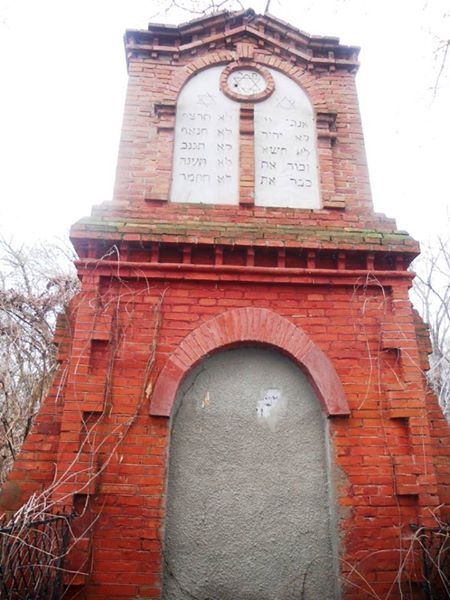

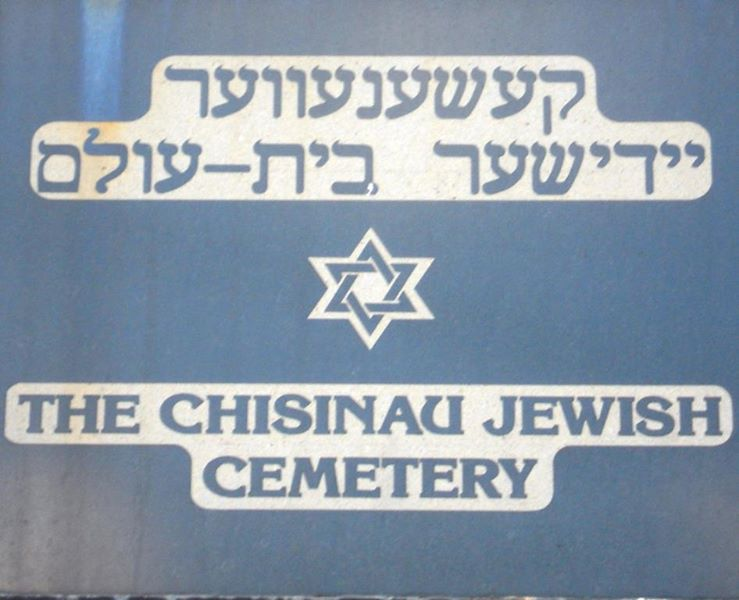

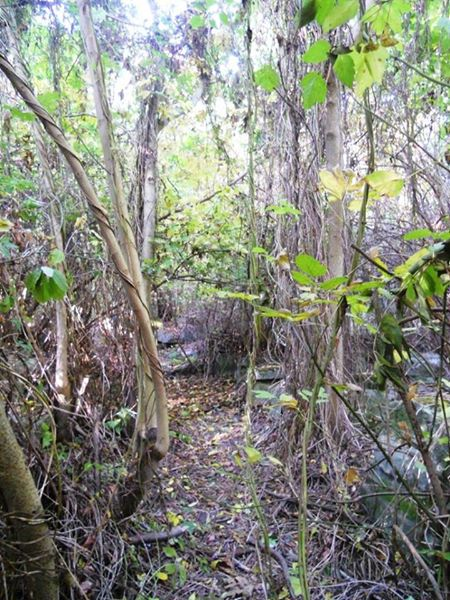
