= Jacob Knaani =

Israeli lexicographer

- יעקב כנעני
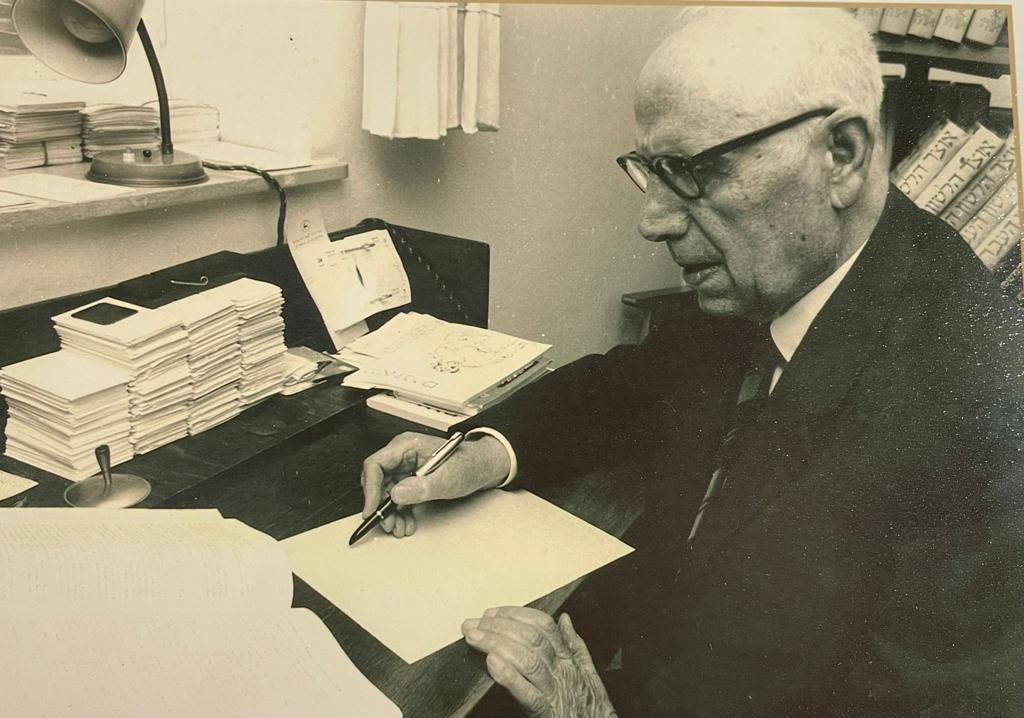
- Born: 1894; Chișinău, Russian Empire
- Died: 1978 (aged 83–84); Jerusalem, Israel
- Occupation: Lexicographer

Jacob Knaani (Hebrew: יעקב כנעני; 1894–1978) was a Bessarabia born, later Israeli, lexicographer.

He is not to be confused with another Hebrew lexicographer, Judah Even Shemuel, who also had the German-Yiddish surname Kaufmann, and whose English-Hebrew dictionary was known as the Kaufmann Dictionary.
