= Sacha Moldovan =

American painter

- Born: Shaya Gdalyevich Shnayder; November 4, 1901; Kishinev, Bessarabia, Russian Empire
- Died: 1984 (aged 82–83)
- Known for: Painting
- Movement: Expressionism

Sacha Moldovan (born Shaya Gdalyevich Shnayder, Russian: Шая Гдальевич Шнайдер; November 4, 1901 – 1982) was a Russian-born American expressionist and Post-Impressionist painter.

== Biography ==
Born to a Jewish family in Kishinev, Bessarabia (in Imperial Russia), where his parents Gdal Shnayder and Bunya Moldovan got married in 1891. He immigrated to the United States, studied in Paris, and became unyieldingly devoted to his work throughout his years.

Moldovan is known to have worked with many other artists, including Henri Matisse and Chaïm Soutine. The noted art critic Marla Berg once said of Moldavan, "Had van Gogh painted Matisse's pictures while dreaming of Chagall, the result would have been the works of Sacha Moldovan". Alongside these artists, he was influenced by Chaïm Soutine, and Pierre Bonnard.

The highest price every paid for a Moldovan was $50,000 for original sold by Hammer Galleries at a one-man show in Manhattan (1991). Moldovan has one daughter, Wendy Moldovan, who today retains many of Sacha's works.

Moldovan's great-nephew, Jonathan Herbert, is also painter. He works in a studio in Brooklyn, NY.

== Selected works ==
- The Woods
- Garden Fence
- Blue Teapot
- Sailboats in a Harbor
- Onions
- An Evening Stroll
- Park Bench
- Men Coming and Going
- Veronique Reading
