= Maria Winetzkaja =

American opera singer

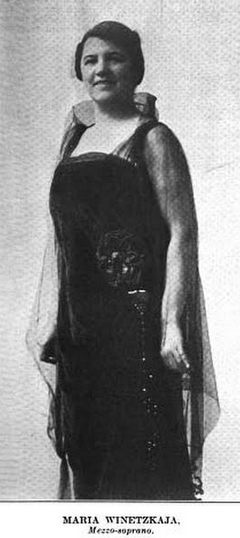
- Maria Winetzkaja, from a 1920 publication
- Born: Maria Kleiner; 1889; Kishinev, Bessarabia Governorate
- Died: May 22, 1956 (aged 66–67); The Bronx, New York, U.S.
- Other names: Maria Winetsky
- Occupation: Opera singer
- Partner: Schai Winett
- Children: 2

Maria Winetzkaja (née Kleiner, Russian: Мария Винецкая; born c. 1889 – May 22, 1956), also seen as Maria Winetskaja, was an American mezzo-soprano opera singer born in Kishinev, in present-day Moldova.

== Early life ==
Winetzkaja was born in Kishinev, in the Bessarabia Governorate of Imperial Russia, the daughter of Wolf Kleiner and Naomi Nemeroff Kleiner. She attended the Imperial Conservatory of Music at Kishinev on a scholarship as a girl, but interrupted her studies in March 1904 to move to the United States with her family. In 1913 she earned a degree at the Institute of Musical Arts in New York.

== Career ==
Winetzkaja was with the Boston National Grand Opera Company from 1917 to 1918. She toured South America and the Caribbean with the Bracale Opera Company from 1919 to 1921. She also performed with Philadelphia's Puccini Opera Company and New York's Grand Opera and Metropolitan Opera companies. She gave recitals at Carnegie Hall and Aeolian Hall, sometimes including Russian and Ukrainian folk songs in her program. She also sang songs in Hebrew. In retirement, she taught voice, and was on the faculty at the Juilliard School.

== Personal life ==
Winetzkaja and civil engineer Schai Winett never officially married, but they lived as a married couple from about 1909, and she used a feminine version of his original surname (Winetsky) as her own. They had two sons, Ralph (b. 1915) and George (b. 1923). "Is my husband musical? All I can answer is that he is my most severe critic," she told an interviewer in 1920. "He has always encouraged me to forge ahead in my own profession. I feel that all I have accomplished is due to him." She was widowed when Schai Winett died in 1941. She died in 1956, when she was about 68 years old, from cancer, at Misericordia Hospital in The Bronx.
