= Győr Synagogue =

Synagogue in Győr, Hungary

- Győri Zsinagóga
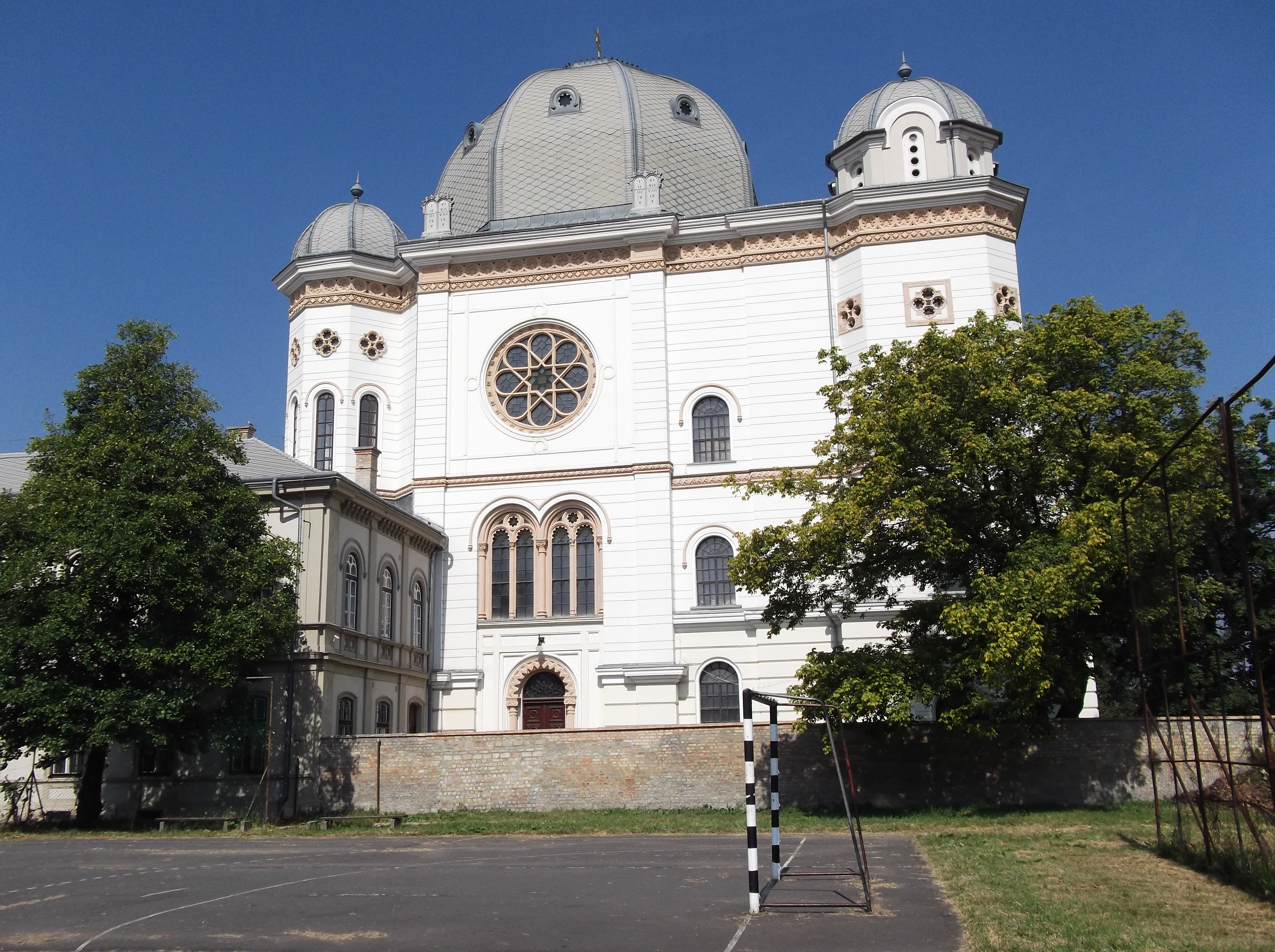

Religion
- Affiliation: Judaism
- Ecclesiastical or organizational status: Converted to museum

Location
- Location: 5 Kossuth Lajos Street (Petőfi Square)
- Municipality: Győr
- Country: Hungary
- Geographic coordinates: 47°41′08″N 17°37′33″E

Architecture
- Architect(s): Jakob Modern
- Style: Art Nouveau
- Creator: Benkó Károly
- Date established: September 15, 1870; 154 years ago
- Groundbreaking: 1868

Specifications
- Capacity: 400 (seated)
- Height (max): 30 meters
- Dome dia. (outer): 14 meters

The Győr Synagogue (Hungarian: Győri zsinagóga) is a Jewish synagogue located in the Újváros neighborhood of Győr, in Hungary. It was built in the 19th century in the Art Nouveau style, and currently serves as a museum that hosts Jewish cultural events.

== History ==
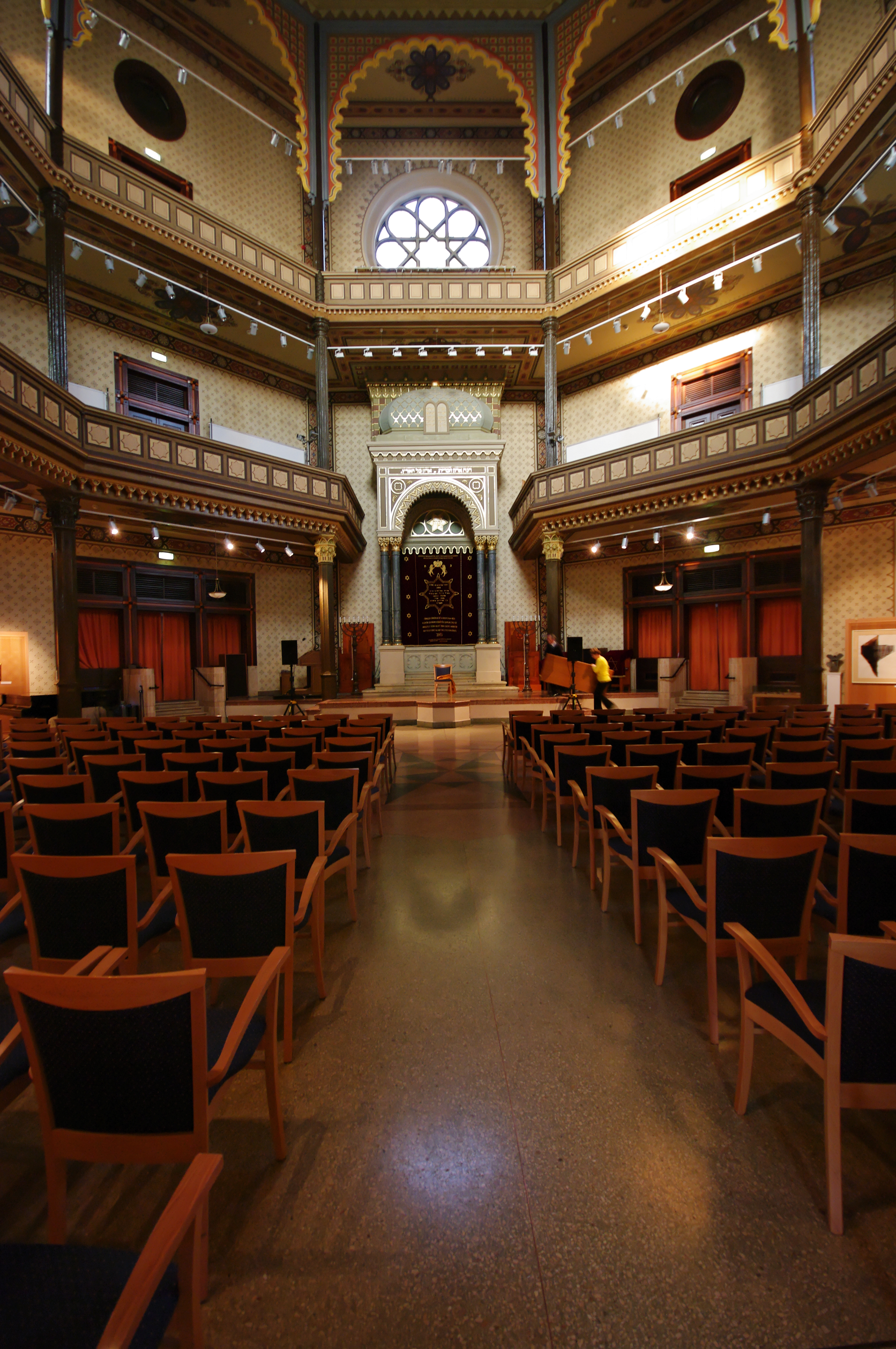
Interior of the synagogue

Beginning construction in 1868, the synagogue was built by architect Benkó Károly, an architect from Pest, Hungary, and was contracted by Vilmos Fränkel of Vienna. It was opened on September 15th, 1870. It was established as a place of worship, with an adjacent two-story building for a religious school. The synagogue was built in the Art Nouveau style, and became an icon building in the city. For a long time, it served as inspiration for construction of places of worship for the Jewish communities of other cities.

In 1927, a "winter shul" was added to the building, which has been partially empty since 1960. The school wing later housed the Franz Liszt Academy of Music, and the prayer hall still operates there to this day. However, the synagogue remained unused and its condition deteriorated over time. It became government-owned in 1968, and the city took ownership in 1993. A decade later, reconstruction of the shul began. During its renovation, the dome painting of the dome was reconstructed on the basis of old photographs, and templates were made for the repainting of the walls. In July 2024, the Zsidó Kiválóságok Kiállítása (Exhibition of Jewish Excellence), a gallery of Jewish innovators, was put on display in the building, with descriptions available in Hebrew, Hungarian, and English.

The synagogue is operated jointly by Széchenyi István University and the City Art Museum. It is often host to concerts, lectures, guided tours, and other events that draw large crowds.
