= Chișinău Choral Synagogue =

Former synagogue in Moldova

Kishenev Choral Synagogue
- Romanian: Sinagoga corală din Chișinău; Russian: Кишинёвская хоральная синагога Hebrew: בית הכנסת הכוראלי של קישינב
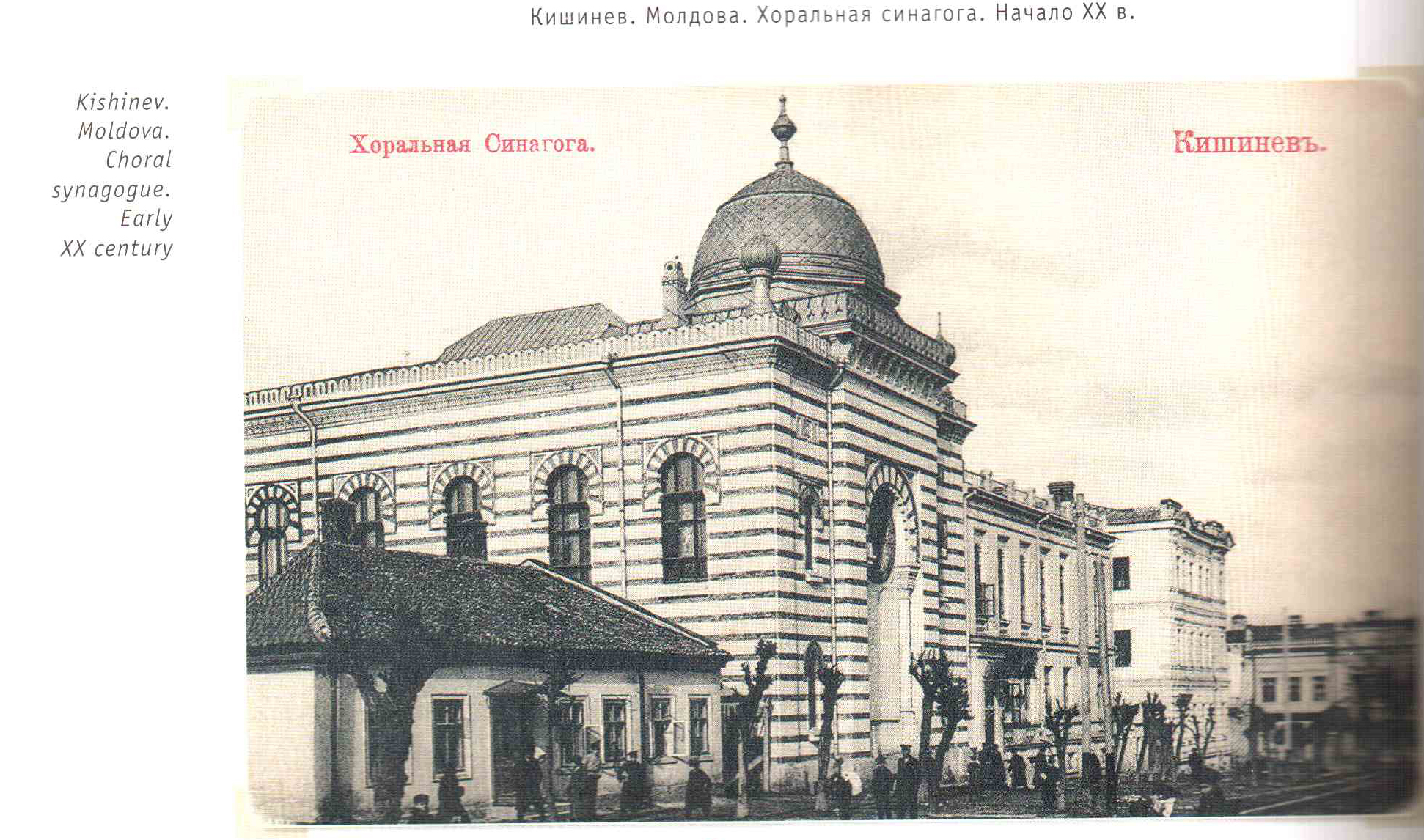
- A postcard of the former synagogue in 1913

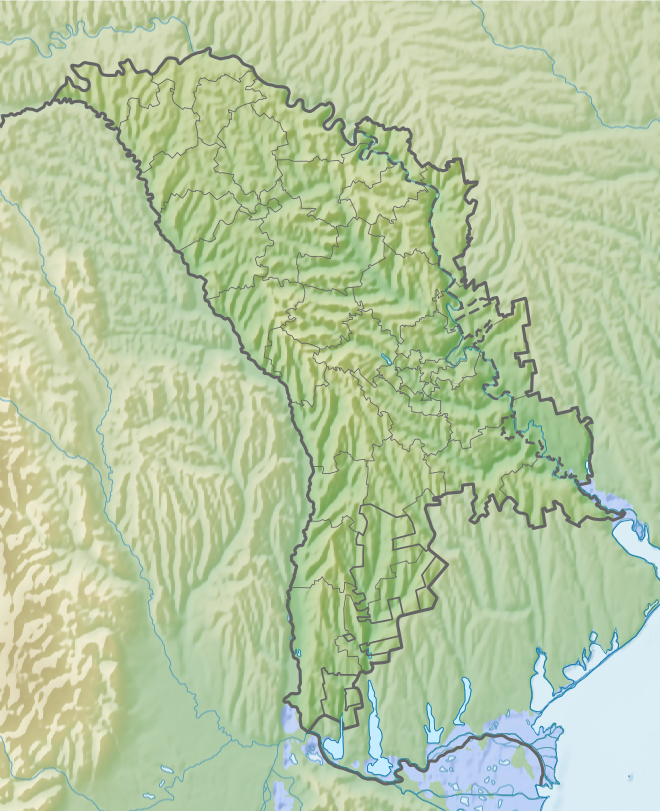
- Location of the synagogue in Moldova

Religion
- Affiliation: Liberal Judaism (former)
- Rite: Nusach Ashkenaz
- Ecclesiastical or organizational status: Synagogue (1913–1940); Theater (since 1950s)
- Status: Inactive (as a synagogue); Repurposed

Location
- Location: 75, Vlaicu Pircalab Street, Chișinău
- Country: Moldova
- Interactive map of Kishenev Choral Synagogue
- Coordinates: 47°01′29″N 28°50′15″E

Architecture
- Type: Synagogue architecture
- Style: Moorish Revival
- Groundbreaking: 1904
- Completed: 1913
- Materials: Brick

The Chișinău Choral Synagogue (Hebrew: בית הכנסת הכוראלי של קישינב; Romanian: Sinagoga corală din Chișinău; Russian: Кишинёвская хоральная синагога) is a former Liberal Jewish congregation and synagogue, located at 75, Vlaicu Pircalab Street, in the city of Chișinău, in Moldova. It was once the most famous synagogue in the country. The building was repurposed as a theater in the 1950s.

== History ==
Construction of the synagogue was completed in 1913 with funds from the local Jewish community to commemorate the 300th anniversary of the Romanov dynasty. Originally built for yeshiva students, it later became the main synagogue of Chișinău.

The synagogue was affiliated with the liberal or progressive tradition in Judaism, as reflected by the synagogue's use of the term "Temple". During Soviet rule, the synagogue was placed under state control. In 1966, the building was reconstructed.

Under the leadership of Rabbi Yehuda Leib Tsirelson, the synagogue and its yeshiva was one of the most well known in Chișinău and earned renowned for its cantors. The synagogue and building were nationalized by the Soviet Union in 1940. After World War II, the building was rebuilt and repurposed into a theater named after Russian playwright Anton Chekhov. According to Yosef Schatz, the theater's director in 2023, it was common for the Soviet Union to repurpose religious institutions like the synagogue.

In 2023, the city of Chișinău placed a plaque at the theater, commemorating its former status as a synagogue, in remembrance of the 120th anniversary of the Kishinev pogrom. The theater is the main Russian theater in Moldova.

== See also ==
- History of the Jews in Bessarabia
- History of the Jews in Chișinău
- List of synagogues in Moldova
