= Abram Vaysbeyn =

Romanian-born soviet architect

Abram Wolfowitz Vaysbeyn (Russian: Абрам Вольфович Вайсбейн), known as Boris Vaysbeyn (born 1927) is a Romanian-born Soviet and Moldovan architect. Born in Chișinău to a Jewish family, he graduated from the Odessa Institute of Civil Engineering in 1951 and worked at the Chișinău Design Institute "Moldgiprostroy". He participated in the planning of the Chișinău neighborhood of Budești. He designed numerous buildings with S.M. Shoikhet in Chișinău, including the State Bank (1972–1973), House of Culture of Railwaymen, College of Winemaking, and the Ministry of Agriculture building etc.

== Literature ==
- Berkovich, Gary. Reclaiming a History. Jewish Architects in Imperial Russia and the USSR. Volume 4. Modernized Socialist Realism: 1955–1991. Weimar und Rostock: Grunberg Verlag. 2022 ISBN 978-3-933713-65-0.
