= Alexandr Bilinkis =

Moldovan businessman, philanthropist, and Jewish cultural figure

- Born: 28 June 1968 (age 58); Chișinău, Moldavian SSR, USSR (now Moldova)
- Citizenship: Moldova, United States
- Occupations: Businessman, public and diplomatic figure
- Spouse: Olga Bilinkis (m. 1991)
- Children: 3
- Parents: Grigory Bilinkis (father); Irina Bilinkis (mother)
- Awards: Order of the Republic (2019), Order of Labour (2008)

Alexandr Bilinkis (born 28 June 1968, Chișinău, Moldavian SSR, Soviet Union) is a Moldovan entrepreneur, public figure, diplomat and philanthropist. He is the President of the Jewish Community of the Republic of Moldova, Vice-President of the World Jewish Congress and Vice-President of the Euro-Asian Jewish Congress. Honorary Consul of Mexico in the Republic of Moldova.

== Early life and education ==
Bilinkis was born on 28 June 1968 in Chișinău to Grigory Markovich Bilinkis and Irina Mikhailovna Bilinkis, both researchers at the Academy of Sciences of the Moldavian SSR.

In 1986, he enrolled in the Faculty of Geological Exploration at the Leningrad Mining Institute, where he studied geology.

== Business career ==
He started his business career in 1990 while studying at the Leningrad Mining Institute.

Bilinkis’s business interests include the food industry, agriculture, retail, logistics and publishing.

== Public and Diplomatic Activities ==
=== Jewish community leadership ===
Bilinkis has been active in the Jewish community of Moldova since 2002. In 2013, he was elected President of the Jewish Community of the Republic of Moldova, a position he has held ever since.

During his presidency, the Jewish Community of the Republic of Moldova has carried out projects to preserve Jewish heritage, support cultural activities, and remember the victims of the Holocaust, including the restoration of Jewish religious and historic sites such as the Great Synagogue of Chișinău named after Rabbi Tsirelson, memorial projects for Holocaust victims, including the renovation of the Memorial to the Victims of Fascism in Chișinău, and support for the creation of the Museum of Jewish History of the Republic of Moldova.

Bilinkis represents the Jewish community of Moldova in international Jewish organizations. Since 2017, he has been Vice President of the Euro-Asian Jewish Congress. In 2025, he became Vice President of the World Jewish Congress.

=== Philanthropy ===
Bilinkis is a member of the Board of the ALT Foundation for the Support and Development of Social Initiatives. The foundation runs projects to preserve cultural and historical heritage and supports educational, humanitarian, sports, and social programs.

=== Honorary consul of Mexico ===
Bilinkis is an Honorary Consul of Mexico to the Republic of Moldova. In this role, he has promoted cultural and economic relations between Mexico and Moldova.

== Personal life ==
Alexander Bilinkis has been married to Olga Bilinkis since 1991.The couple has three children.

== Awards ==
- Order of the Republic (2019) — the highest state award of the Republic of Moldova, conferred for outstanding contributions to the preservation and promotion of historical and cultural heritage, to the harmonization of interethnic relations, for sustained support of social and humanitarian initiatives, and for extensive public service.
- Order of Labour (2008) — awarded for significant contributions to the promotion of moral and spiritual values and for productive organizational and public activity).
- Parliamentary Medal "Democracy" (2019) — awarded for outstanding contributions to social cohesion, the development of civil society, and the promotion of the rule of law, in accordance with the objectives of the Parliament of the Republic of Moldova.
- Honorary Diploma of the Government of the Republic of Moldova (First Class) (2017) — awarded for professionalism, dedication, civic engagement, and the promotion of national cultural values.
- American Jewish Committee’s Jewish Leadership Award (11 July 2016) — awarded by the American Jewish Committee in recognition of his long-standing efforts to consolidate, develop, and revitalize the Jewish Community of Moldova.
- Honorary Certificate of the State of Israel (2023) — awarded in recognition of his significant contribution to mutual understanding and the strengthening of diplomatic, cultural, and friendly relations between the Republic of Moldova and the State of Israel.
