= Eliahu Itzkovitz =

Israeli soldier

- 'אליהו איצקוביץ
- Born: Chișinău, Kingdom of Romania
- Military career
- Allegiance: Israel (1952–1953); France (1953–1958)
- Branch: (Israel) Israeli Army (Israel) Israeli Navy; French Foreign Legion (1953–1958)
- Units: Paratroopers Brigade; 3rd Foreign Infantry Regiment
- Conflicts: First Indochina War

Eliahu Itzkovitz (Hebrew: 'אליהו איצקוביץ; 1932 - 2015) was a Romanian Jew of Moldavian descent who, while a prisoner in a concentration camp during the Second World War, witnessed the murder of his family at the hands of a Romanian prison guard named Stănescu. Itzkovitz vowed to avenge his family's murder but was unable to find the murderer after the war.

He subsequently emigrated to Israel and served in the Israel Defense Forces (IDF) until he learned that Stănescu had enlisted in the French Foreign Legion, thus leading him to desert from the IDF and join the Foreign Legion. Itzkovitz was able to track down and kill Stănescu in French Indochina. He was later court-martialed in Israel for desertion and sentenced to one year in prison.

== Early life ==
Eliahu Itzkovitz was born to a Jewish family in Chișinău, Romania (now part of Moldova).

== World War II ==
During the Second World War, Eliahu and his family were interned in a concentration camp in Romania, where he witnessed the murder of his parents and three brothers by a Romanian prison guard named Stănescu. Itzkovitz survived the camp and was liberated by Soviet forces in 1944.

== In the Socialist Republic of Romania ==
After returning to Romania, Itzkovitz began to search for Stănescu to exact revenge. He failed to find Stănescu but found his son and stabbed him with a butcher knife. In 1947, a Romanian court sentenced him to five years in a juvenile reformatory. In 1952, he was released and granted permission by the communist authorities in Romania to emigrate to Israel.

== Service in Israel Defence Forces ==
=== Paratroopers ===
In 1953 he was drafted into the Israel Defense Forces where he served in the Paratroopers Brigade. During this time he learned that Stănescu had managed to escape into the French occupation zone of Germany and enlisted in the French Foreign Legion. This knowledge caused Itzkovitz to decide to hunt him down.

=== Navy ===
Itzkovitz applied for a transfer to the Israeli Navy, which was granted without much difficulty. He was soon after posted to a squadron of destroyers and corvettes based in Haifa. After several months in the navy, the ship he was serving on put to port in Genoa, Italy to fetch a collection of equipment. Itzkovitz seized the opportunity and deserted, crossing the border to France where he enlisted in the Foreign Legion.

== Service in the French Foreign Legion ==
Upon enlisting in France, he was shipped to Algeria where he underwent basic training. After completing basic training, he continued looking for Stănescu leading to his discovery that Stănescu was serving with the 3rd Foreign Infantry Regiment in French Indochina. This led Itzkovitz to volunteer for duty with the 3rd REI, and within three months of enlistment he was shipped off to Indochina where he was able to acquire a posting in the same battalion as Stănescu. After a short amount of time, he was able to get a posting in Stănescu's unit.

Stănescu had since enlisting risen to the rank of Corporal and was leading a squad of men. Itzkovitz took his time in looking for the proper moment for revenge against Stănescu. He confronted and killed Stănescu while on patrol along Route Coloniale 18 near Bắc Ninh. Itzkovitz served out the remainder of his enlistment until his discharge in 1958.

== Later life ==
After completing his enlistment in the French Foreign Legion, Itzkovitz proceeded to the Israeli Embassy in Paris where he presented himself to the military attaché to answer for his previous desertion. After they verified his claims, he voluntarily travelled back to Israel for trial. At his court-martial he was found guilty, but was sentenced to one year imprisonment in light of the unusual circumstances surrounding his desertion.

== Literary works ==
In 2019, Gabriel Joshua Saada, who claims to have been a friend of Itzkovitz, published a book on the story in French titled Revenge of a Jewish Child. According to Saada, Itzkovitz died in 2015 and had asked him to publish his story.
