= Judah Even Shemuel =

Israeli Jewish scholar, translator, and lexicographer

Yehuda Even Shemuel
- יהודה עבן שמואל
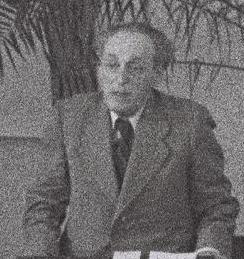
- Yehuda Even Shemuel
- Born: 1886; Balta, Podolia Governorate, Russian Empire
- Died: 1976 (aged 89–90); Jerusalem, Israel
- Occupations: Scholar, translator, lexicographer
- Writing career
- Notable work: The Kaufman Dictionary
- Notable awards: Israel Prize (1973)

Yehuda Even Shemuel (Hebrew: יהודה עבן שמואל; Ukraine, 1886-Jerusalem, 1976) was an Israeli Jewish scholar, translator and lexicographer. He won the Israel Prize in 1973.

Yehuda Kaufman (later Even Shemuel) was born in Balta, Podolia Governorate, Russian Empire. He studied in three yeshivot. At the age of eighteen, after passing the examination of a six-years’ course in a Russian gymnasium, he studied in London and then Paris, where he was accepted to the law school of the University of Paris. He immigrated to Montreal, Canada in 1913.

His English-Hebrew dictionary was known as The Kaufman Dictionary.

After the birth of his son Shmuel, he adopted the name Even Shmuel (Ibn Samuel), after his father, and following his death, on the day of his discharge from the Palmach on May 2, 1947, he officially changed his name.
