= David Kaushansky =

Soviet lawyer

- Давид Каушанский
- Born: David Moiseevich Kaushansky; 28 March 1893; Chișinău, Russian Empire
- Died: 8 August 1968 (aged 75); Chișinău, Moldovan SSR, Soviet Union
- Occupation: lawyer

David Moiseevich Kaushansky (Russian: Давид Моисеевич Каушанский, German: D. M. Kauschansky; 28 March 1893 – 8 August 1968) was a Soviet lawyer, professor, and Doctor of Judicial Sciences.

== Biography ==
David Moiseevich Kaushansky was born on 15 March (Old Style) 1893 in Chișinău, in the family of Moishe Elevich Kaushansky and Reisi Kaushansky. He graduated from the Chișinău gymnasium, then received a philological and legal education in Chernivtsi University (1919–1920), Basel University (1920–1921) and Heidelberg University (1921–1922) (he graduated from the latter with a doctorate in Roman and Civil law; his thesis topic was "Comparative analysis of the rights of illegitimate children according to modern law"). He trained at the universities of Berlin and Freiburg. Since 1922 he was an associate professor at Heidelberg University, since 1924 — Associate Professor at the University of Berlin.

Since 1931 he was a professor at the University of Paris, from 1934 to 1940 — Professor of the Department of Civil and International Law of the University of Bucharest. In 1936 in Bucharest he married Ela Vorozhiltseva (née Zelinger). After annexation of Bessarabia to the USSR in 1940, he returned to Chișinău where he was appointed professor at the Chișinău Conservatory, the Pedagogical Institute and the Institute of Foreign Languages (there he taught German language). He became a member of the codification commission of the People's Commissariat of Justice of the Moldavian SSR.

After the beginning of the Great Patriotic War, he was evacuated with a pedagogical institute in Chimkent, where he worked as a secondary school teacher, and since 1943 — a teacher at the Alma-Ata State Law Institute. Since 1945 he was a professor of the Department of State Law. He was awarded the medal "For Valiant Labor in the Great Patriotic War of 1941—1945" (1946). In 1947 he was appointed Head of the Department of Theory and History of State and Law of Rostov State University. He was dismissed during the Campaign against cosmopolitanism in 1948.

He published a number of works in the field of civil and international law, history of jurisprudence, and also in the field of philology. In the 1930s he published articles in Russian magazine "Law and Court: Journal of the Russian Juridical Society" (Riga), he also collaborated with "Judische Familien Forschung" magazine. Among his publications are reviews on history and legal situation in Muslim countries, in the USSR, Romania, the Balkans, and on legal aspects in Old Slavonic and Hebrew sources.

=== Works ===
- Evolution des Sovietrussischen Eherechts. Die Ehe im Gesetz und in der Gerichtspraxis. Berlin: Marcus Verlag, 1931.
- Evolution Des Sowjetrussischen Familienrechts. Berlin—Köln: Marcus Verlag, 1931.

== Literature ==
- Краковский К. П. Каушанский Давид Моисеевич (март 1893 — после 1950) — профессор, исследователь проблем правовой науки / К. П. Краковский // Правовая наука и юридическая идеология России: Энциклопедический словарь биография. Том 2: (1917—1964 гг.) / Государственное образовательное учреждение высшего профессионального образования «Российская академия правосудия»; Отв. ред. В. М. Сырых. — М.: РАП, 2011. — С. 336–337.
