= Akhmechetka concentration camp =

Romanian-run concentration camp in occupied Ukraine during World War II

Akhmechetka
- Concentration camp
- Location: Akmechetka, Transnistria Governorate (now Prybuzhzhya, Ukraine)
- Operated by: Kingdom of Romania
- Operational: 1942–1943
- Inmates: Primarily Jews

The Akhmechetka concentration camp (also spelled Akmechetka and known in Romanian sources as Acmecetca) was a Romanian-administered concentration camp at Akmechetka in the Golta County of the Transnistria Governorate during World War II. It was established in the spring of 1942 by Golta prefect Modest Isopescu on an abandoned pig farm in the Domanovka district.

The camp held Jews considered unfit for work, including elderly and sick people, women and children, as well as prisoners sent there as punishment. Approximately 4,000 Jews were initially confined at Akhmechetka. Prisoners were crowded into four former pigsties and a warehouse surrounded by barbed wire and guarded by Ukrainian police subordinate to Romanian gendarmes.

Prisoners received little food and inadequate medical care. Many died from starvation, exposure, typhus, dysentery and other diseases. The International Commission on the Holocaust in Romania described the camp's purpose as extermination through isolation. By May 1942, only several hundred of the approximately 4,000 initial prisoners remained alive, although additional prisoners continued to arrive.

Romanian authorities sometimes designated Akhmechetka a "ghetto". Historian Dennis Deletant classified it as a concentration camp based on its conditions. Historian Jean Ancel identified Akhmechetka, together with Bogdanovka and Domanovka, as among the principal sites in Golta County where Romanian gendarmes and their auxiliaries killed Jews during the Holocaust.
