= Murafa, Vinnytsia Oblast =

Village in Vinnytsia Oblast, Ukraine

Murafa Мурафа
- Village
- Location in Vinnytsia Oblast Location in Ukraine
- Coordinates: 48°47′N 28°13′E
- Country: Ukraine
- Oblast: Vinnytsia Oblast
- Raion: Zhmerynka Raion
- Hromada: Murafa rural hromada
- Postal code: 23530
- Area code: +380 4344

Murafa (Ukrainian: Мурафа; Polish: Morachwa; Yiddish: מראַכווע, romanized: Mrakhve) is a village in Zhmerynka Raion, Vinnytsia Oblast, Ukraine. It is located in the historical region of Podolia, approximately 12 kilometres (7.5 mi) from Sharhorod, and is the administrative centre of the Murafa rural hromada.

Murafa had a Jewish community from the 17th century until the 20th century. During World War II, it was incorporated into the Romanian-administered Transnistria Governorate. A ghetto established in the village held local Jews and thousands of Jews deported from Bukovina and the Dorohoi region of Romania.

== History ==
By 1629, Murafa was a border town of the Podolian Voivodeship in the Polish–Lithuanian Commonwealth. The settlement consisted of Old Murafa and New Murafa.

Following the Second Partition of Poland in 1793, Murafa became part of the Russian Empire and was incorporated into Podolia Governorate. During the Soviet period, Old Murafa, New Murafa and neighbouring settlements were combined. The settlement was renamed Zhdanove (Жданове) in 1949 and reverted to its historical name in 1989.

=== Jewish history ===
Jews settled in Murafa during the first half of the 17th century. The community was mentioned in a rabbinical responsum in 1647. Jewish settlement was disrupted during the Khmelnytsky Uprising and was re-established several decades later.

The 1765 census recorded 221 Jews in Old Murafa and 115 in New Murafa. The two communities remained separate during the 19th century, when both maintained synagogues and houses of prayer. Hasidism became influential among local Jews during this period.

In June 1919, during the Russian Civil War, soldiers carried out a pogrom in Murafa over several days. Sixty-four Jews were killed, and much of the Jewish quarter was destroyed.

In 1923, Murafa had 1,229 Jewish residents. The 1926 census recorded 1,421 Jews. A Yiddish-language school operated in the settlement until the late 1930s.

=== The Holocaust ===
German and Romanian forces occupied Murafa on 20 July 1941. Many Jewish residents evacuated eastward before the occupation, leaving approximately 800 local Jews in the settlement. Murafa subsequently became part of the Romanian-administered Transnistria Governorate.

Beginning in the autumn of 1941, Jews deported from Romania were brought to Murafa. Approximately 3,500 deportees from Suceava, Câmpulung Moldovenesc, Rădăuți and Dorohoi arrived during the initial deportations. By March 1943, relief organizations recorded approximately 4,500 Jews in the ghetto, including 3,700 deportees and 800 local Jews.

Deportees were housed throughout the town, many with local Jewish families and others in public buildings or the homes of non-Jewish residents. The ghetto suffered from overcrowding, food shortages and poor sanitation. A typhus epidemic during the winter of 1941–42 caused numerous deaths.

A Jewish committee administered the ghetto's internal affairs and represented its residents before Romanian and Ukrainian authorities. It organized welfare and medical services and supplied workers for forced labour. A Jewish police force operated under the committee. The ghetto's welfare institutions included a soup kitchen serving approximately 1,400 people, medical facilities and a pharmacy.

Jewish residents were required to perform forced labour, including clearing snow during the winter and working on roads and in stone quarries in 1942. Some prisoners were sent to labour camps elsewhere in Transnistria, including sites associated with German construction projects near the Southern Bug.

Romanian authorities ordered the transfer of 1,000 Jews from Murafa to the Pechora concentration camp, but the order was rescinded following intervention by the ghetto leadership.

A synagogue remained in use during the occupation, and prayer services were also held in private homes. Some children received informal instruction.

Romanian forces withdrew from Murafa in March 1944 as the Red Army advanced into the region. Soviet forces entered the settlement on 20 March 1944. Surviving deportees began returning to Romania during the following months.

=== Postwar period ===
A Jewish community remained in Murafa after the war. Its population declined as residents moved to larger cities and later emigrated from the Soviet Union. By the early 21st century, no permanent Jewish community remained in the village.

== See also ==
- The Holocaust in Romania
- Transnistria Governorate
- Pechora concentration camp
- Sharhorod
- Dzhuryn
