= Shpykiv =

Rural locality in Vinnytsia Oblast, Ukraine

- Rural settlement
- Świejkowski Palace in the 19th century

- Location within Vinnytsia Oblast Location within Ukraine
- Coordinates: 48°47′N 28°34′E
- Country: Ukraine
- Oblast: Vinnytsia Oblast
- District: Tulchyn Raion
- Founded: 1507

Area
  - Total: 45 km^{2} (17 sq mi)

Population (2022)
  - Total: 2,917
  - Density: 65/km^{2} (170/sq mi)
- Time zone: UTC+2 (EET)
  - Summer (DST): UTC+3 (EEST)

Shpykiv (Ukrainian: Шпи́ків, Polish: Szpików) is a rural settlement in Tulchyn Raion (a district in Vinnytsia Oblast (province) in central Ukraine, 372 kilometers (231 mi) southwest of Kyiv and 24 km (15 mi) northwest of Tulchyn, the raion center. Population: 2,917 (2022 estimate). It is located in the historic region of Podolia.

== History ==
Shpykiv is first mentioned in 16th-century records; by 1546 it was recorded as the centre of the Krasne volost. In the 16th century it belonged to the Kiszka family, and in 1586 part of the estate was sold to the Ostrogski family.

Until the Second Partition of Poland Szpików was part of the Bracław Voivodeship of the Lesser Poland Province of the Polish Crown. It was a small town, owned by the houses of Ostrogski, Zamoyski, Koniecpolski, Potocki and Świejkowski. Leonard Marcin Świejkowski built a Baroque palace in Szpików.

From 1793 to 1917 it was a town in Bratslav uyezd in Podolian Governorate of the Russian Empire. It formerly had a significant Jewish community, which numbered 1,875 in 1900. In January 1989, the population was 4,285 people In January 2013, the population was 3,355 people.

Shpykiv historically had a substantial Jewish community. Jews were recorded in the town by the 18th century, and the community grew considerably during the 19th century under the Russian Empire. In 1897, 1,875 Jews lived in Shpykiv, comprising approximately half of its population. The community maintained synagogues and religious schools, while many Jewish residents worked as merchants and artisans. During the Soviet period, Jewish religious and communal institutions were progressively restricted or closed. By the 1939 Soviet census, the Jewish population had declined to 895, representing 17.7 percent of Shpykiv's population.

=== World War II and the Holocaust ===
The German invasion of the Soviet Union in June 1941 marked the beginning of the destruction of Shpykiv's Jewish community. Some Jewish men were mobilized into the Red Army, while a smaller number of residents fled eastward before the arrival of Axis forces, but most of the town's Jews remained.

German and Romanian forces occupied Shpykiv on 22 July 1941. Some local Jewish leaders and Communist Party members were killed shortly after the occupation. In the autumn of 1941, Shpykiv was incorporated into the Romanian-administered Transnistria Governorate, where its name was Romanianized as Spicov. It became the administrative centre of Spicov district in Tulcin County.

The remaining Jews were initially concentrated on a single street. On 22 September 1941, the prefect of Tulcin County, Colonel Ion Lazăr, issued an ordinance requiring the Jews of Shpykiv to be confined in a ghetto within three days. Jews from surrounding communities were also brought to Shpykiv, and a small number of Jewish deportees from Bukovina appear to have been confined there. The Romanian authorities required the creation of a Jewish police force and severely restricted the movement of ghetto inmates. Jews were also subjected to forced labour under the Romanian occupation.

On 8 December 1941, Romanian authorities deported 848 Jews from Shpykiv to Rogozna, a village near the Southern Bug, leaving only 27 Jews in Shpykiv. At Rogozna, the deportees were confined under extremely poor conditions. Hunger, disease and mistreatment by the Ukrainian policemen guarding them caused numerous deaths.

In August 1942, the surviving Shpykiv Jews at Rogozna were transferred to the Pechora concentration camp, a Romanian-administered camp where thousands of Jews from communities throughout Transnistria were imprisoned. Prisoners at Pechora were deliberately deprived of adequate food, shelter and medical care, and large numbers died from starvation, exposure and disease. According to postwar figures, 539 Jews from Shpykiv district died at Pechora.

The Romanian occupation of Shpykiv ended with the Soviet westward advance in March 1944. The Red Army recaptured the town on 18 March 1944. The Jewish community never recovered its prewar size; although some Jews returned after the war, the Jewish population continued to decline during the Soviet period.

=== Recent ===
Until 26 January 2024, Shpykiv was designated urban-type settlement. On this day, a new law entered into force which abolished this status, and Shpykiv became a rural settlement.
