= Administrative divisions of the Kingdom of Romania (1941–1944) =

This article discusses the administrative divisions of the Kingdom of Romania between 1941 and 1944. As a result of the Soviet occupation of Bessarabia and Northern Bukovina (28 June – 4 July 1940), Second Vienna Award (30 August 1940) and the Treaty of Craiova (7 September 1940), territories that had previously been part of Romania were lost to the Soviet Union, Hungary and Bulgaria respectively. By September 1940 the administrative system set up in 1938 based on 'ținuturi' (regions) was disbanded and the former counties (județe) were reintroduced.

In 1941, the Romanian participation in the invasion of the Soviet Union led to the recovery of Bessarabia and Northern Bukovina. Transnistria, a former Soviet territory between the Dniester and the Southern Bug, with the major Black Sea port of Odessa, was occupied by the Romanian Army in the autumn of 1941 and was kept under Romanian administration without being formally annexed.

== Background ==
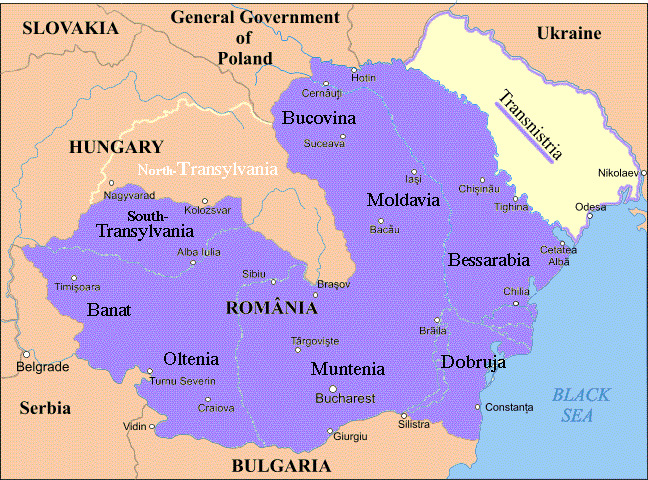
Kingdom of Romania in 1941–44

As in the 1926-1938 period, Romania had two levels of administrative sub-divisions. The first level division was the County (Județ) and the City with Municipal Status (Municipiu). Counties were divided into Districts (Plasă) and Urban Districts (Oraș), which constituted the second level. The Government of Romania was represented at County level and in Bucharest municipality by a prefect and at District level by a pretor. Between 1941 and 1944 these positions were usually occupied by middle-ranking officers of the Romanian army.

The City of Bucharest had the unique status of being both a City with Municipal Status and the Capital of Romania (Capitala României) and was legally distinct from the other Counties and Cities.

In addition, the territories regained from the Soviet Union were organized into 2 large Governorates (Guvernăminte) led by high-ranking officers of the Romanian army: the Bukovina Governorate (capital at Cernăuți) and the Bessarabia Governorate (capital at Chișinău).

Another Governorate was created in Transnistria with the capital established firstly at Tiraspol (1941–42), then moved to Odessa (1942–44). Unlike Bessarabia and Bukovina, Transnistria was not considered to be an integral part of Romania in 1941-44 and the Soviet second-level administrative divisions, the 'raions', were kept intact.

Administrative map of Romania and Transnistria Governorate in May 1942

Ethnic composition of Romania and Transnistria Governorate per the 1941 Romanian census (21 out of the 73 counties did not have a Romanian majority, most of them in Transnistria)

== Administrative subdivisions of Romania ==
Listed below are the administrative sub-divisions of Romania in May 1942. Capitals of Counties are shown in parentheses. Note: District names coincide with the names of their capitals if not otherwise specified (e.g.:Plasa Ștefan Vodă-Rădăuți)

I. Romania proper (part of the country that was not previously occupied by the Soviet Union)

- Județul Bihor (Beiuș)
  - Orașul Beiuș
  - Plasa Beiuș
  - Plasa Beliu
  - Plasa Ceica
  - Plasa Ciumeghiu
  - Plasa Tinca
  - Plasa Vașcău
- Județul Arad (Arad)
  - Municipiul Arad
  - Plasa Aradu Nou
  - Plasa Curtici
  - Plasa Chișineu-Criș
  - Plasa Gurahonț
  - Plasa Hălmagiu
  - Plasa Ineu
  - Plasa Pecica
  - Plasa Radna
  - Plasa Săvârșin
  - Plasa Sfânta Ana
  - Plasa Sebiș
  - Plasa Șiria
  - Plasa Târnova
- Județul Timiș-Torontal (Timișoara)
  - Municipiul Timișoara
  - Orașul Lipova
  - Plasa Buziaș
  - Plasa Chizătău
  - Plasa Ciacova
  - Plasa Deta
  - Plasa Gătaia
  - Plasa Giulvăz
  - Plasa Jimbolia
  - Plasa Lipova
  - Plasa Periam
  - Plasa Recaș
  - Plasa Sânnicolau Mare
  - Plasa Timișoara
  - Plasa Vinga
- Județul Caraș (Oravița)
  - Orașul Oravița
  - Orașul Reșița
  - Plasa Bocșa Vasiova
  - Plasa Bozovici
  - Plasa Moldova Nouă
  - Plasa Oravița
  - Plasa Reșița
  - Plasa Sasca Montană
- Județul Severin (Lugoj)
  - Orașul Lugoj
  - Orașul Caransebeș
  - Orașul Orșova
  - Plasa Balint
  - Plasa Birchiș
  - Plasa Caransebeș
  - Plasa Făget
  - Plasa Lugoj
  - Plasa Margina
  - Plasa Orșova
  - Plasa Sacu
  - Plasa Teregova
- Județul Cluj-Turda (Turda)
  - Orașul Turda
  - Plasa Baia de Arieș
  - Plasa Câmpeni
  - Plasa Câmpia Turzii
  - Plasa Călata
  - Plasa Căpuș
  - Plasa Iara
  - Plasa Luduș
  - Plasa Mihai Viteazu
  - Plasa Mociu
  - Plasa Sărmaș
  - Plasa Săvădisla
  - Plasa Turda
- Județul Hunedoara (Deva)
  - Orașul Deva
  - Orașul Brad
  - Orașul Hunedoara
  - Orașul Hațeg
  - Orașul Orăștie
  - Orașul Petroșani
  - Plasa Baia de Criș
  - Plasa Brad
  - Plasa Deva
  - Plasa Dobra
  - Plasa Geoagiu
  - Plasa Hațeg
  - Plasa Hunedoara
  - Plasa Ilia
  - Plasa Orăștie
  - Plasa Petroșani
  - Plasa Pui
  - Plasa Sarmisegetuza
- Județul Alba (Alba Iulia)
  - Municipiul Alba Iulia
  - Orașul Abrud
  - Orașul Aiud
  - Orașul Sebeș
  - Plasa Abrud
  - Plasa Aiud
  - Plasa Alba Iulia
  - Plasa Ocna Mureș
  - Plasa Sebeș
  - Plasa Teiuș
  - Plasa Vințu de Jos
  - Plasa Zlatna
- Județul Târnava Mică (Blaj)
  - Orașul Blaj
  - Orașul Dumbrăveni
  - Orașul Târnăveni
  - Plasa Bachnea
  - Plasa Blaj
  - Plasa Dumbrăveni
  - Plasa Iernut
  - Plasa Târnăveni
  - Plasa Valea Lungă
- Județul Târnava Mare (Sighișoara)
  - Orașul Sighișoara
  - Orașul Mediaș
  - Plasa Agnita
  - Plasa Mediaș
  - Plasa Rupea
  - Plasa Saschiz
  - Plasa Sighișoara
  - Plasa Șeica Mare
- Județul Sibiu (Sibiu)
  - Municipiul Sibiu
  - Plasa Mercurea Sibiului
  - Plasa Nocrich
  - Plasa Ocna Sibiului
  - Plasa Săliște
  - Plasa Sibiu
  - Plasa Tălmaciu
- Județul Făgăraș (Făgăraș)
  - Orașul Făgăraș
  - Plasa Arpașu de Jos
  - Plasa Cincu
  - Plasa Făgăraș
  - Plasa Șercaia
- Județul Brașov (Brașov)
  - Municipiul Brașov
  - Plasa Codlea
  - Plasa Cernatu
  - Plasa Feldioara
  - Plasa Hărman
  - Plasa Intorsura Buzăului
  - Plasa Zărnești
- Județul Mehedinți (Turnu Severin)
  - Orașul Turnu Severin
  - Orașul Baia de Aramă
  - Orașul Strehaia
  - Plasa Baia de Aramă
  - Plasa Bâcleșu
  - Plasa Bălăcița
  - Plasa Broșteni
  - Plasa Cujmir
  - Plasa Devesel
  - Plasa Malovăț
  - Plasa Strehaia
  - Plasa Turnu Severin
  - Plasa Vânju Mare
- Județul Gorj (Târgu Jiu)
  - Orașul Târgu Jiu
  - Plasa Brădiceni
  - Plasa Novaci
  - Plasa Peșteana-Jiu
  - Plasa Târgu Cărbunești
  - Plasa Târgu Jiu
  - Plasa Târgu Logrești
- Județul Vâlcea (Râmnicu Vâlcea)
  - Orașul Râmnicu Vâlcea
  - Orașul Băile Govora
  - Orașul Călimănești
  - Orașul Drăgășani
  - Orașul Ocnele Mari
  - Plasa Bălcești
  - Plasa Drăgășani
  - Plasa Grădiștea
  - Plasa Horezu
  - Plasa Lădești
  - Plasa Râmnicu Vâlcea
- Județul Romanați (Caracal)
  - Orașul Caracal
  - Orașul Balș
  - Orașul Corabia
  - Plasa Balș
  - Plasa Caracal
  - Plasa Corabia
  - Plasa Dioști
  - Plasa Piatra Olt
  - Plasa Zănoaga
- Județul Dolj (Craiova)
  - Municipiul Craiova
  - Orașul Băilești
  - Orașul Calafat
  - Orașul Plenița
  - Plasa Amaradia
  - Plasa Bârca
  - Plasa Băilești
  - Plasa Brabova
  - Plasa Breasta
  - Plasa Calafat
  - Plasa Craiova
  - Plasa Filiași
  - Plasa Gângiova
  - Plasa Murgașu
  - Plasa Plenița
  - Plasa Rojiștea
  - Plasa Segarcea
- Județul Argeș (Pitești)
  - Orașul Pitești
  - Orașul Curtea de Argeș
  - Plasa Costești
  - Plasa Curtea de Argeș
  - Plasa Jiblea
  - Plasa Pitești
  - Plasa Rociu
  - Plasa Stoicești
  - Plasa Titești
- Județul Muscel (Câmpulung)
  - Orașul Câmpulung
  - Plasa Câmpulung
  - Plasa Domnești
  - Plasa Stâlpeni
  - Plasa Drăgănești-Muscel
- Județul Dâmbovița (Târgoviște)
  - Orașul Târgoviște
  - Orașul Găești
  - Orașul Pucioasa
  - Plasa Bilciurești
  - Plasa Colanu
  - Plasa Găești
  - Plasa Ghergani
  - Plasa Pucioasa
  - Plasa Titu
  - Plasa Târgoviște
  - Plasa Valea Mare
  - Plasa Voinești
- Județul Olt (Slatina)
  - Orașul Slatina
  - Plasa Drăgănești-Olt
  - Plasa Potcoava
  - Plasa Slatina
  - Plasa Spineni
  - Plasa Vulturești
- Județul Teleorman (Turnu Măgurele)
  - Orașul Turnu Măgurele
  - Orașul Alexandria
  - Orașul Roșiori de Vede
  - Orașul Zimnicea
  - Plasa Alexandria
  - Plasa Balaci
  - Plasa Roșiorii de Vede
  - Plasa Salcia
  - Plasa Slăvești
  - Plasa Turnu Măgurele
  - Plasa Vârtoapele de Sus
  - Plasa Zimnicea
- Județul Vlașca (Giurgiu)
  - Orașul Giurgiu
  - Plasa Arsache
  - Plasa Comana
  - Plasa Corbii Mari
  - Plasa Drăgănești-Vlașca
  - Plasa Giurgiu
  - Plasa Ghimpați
  - Plasa Siliștea
  - Plasa Vida
- Județul Ilfov (București)
  - Municipiul București
  - Orașul Oltenița
  - Plasa Bolintin-Vale
  - Plasa Brănești
  - Plasa Budești
  - Plasa Buftea
  - Plasa Domnești
  - Plasa Fierbinți-Târg
  - Plasa Oltenița
  - Plasa Otopeni
  - Plasa Pârlita
  - Plasa Vidra
- Județul Prahova (Ploești)
  - Municipiul Ploești
  - Orașul Câmpina
  - Orașul Filipești-Târg
  - Orașul Predeal
  - Orașul Sinaia
  - Orașul Slănic
  - Orașul Urlați
  - Orașul Vălenii de Munte
  - Plasa Bălțești
  - Plasa Câmpina
  - Plasa Drăgănești-Prahova
  - Plasa Filipești-Târg
  - Plasa Ploești
  - Plasa Poenari-Burchi
  - Plasa Sinaia
  - Plasa Slănic
  - Plasa Urlați
  - Plasa Vălenii de Munte
- Județul Buzău (Buzău)
  - Orașul Buzău
  - Orașul Mizil
  - Plasa Buzău
  - Plasa Gura Dimieni
  - Plasa Mărăcineni
  - Plasa Mihăilești
  - Plasa Mizil
  - Plasa Pârscov
  - Plasa Pătârlagele
  - Plasa Pogoanele
- Județul Râmnicu Sărat (Râmnicu Sărat)
  - Orașul Râmnicu Sărat
  - Plasa Râmnicu-Râmnicu Sărat
  - Plasa Boldu
  - Plasa Dumitrești
  - Plasa Măicănești
  - Plasa Plăinești
- Județul Ialomița (Călărași)
  - Orașul Călărași
  - Orașul Fetești
  - Orașul Slobozia
  - Orașul Urziceni
  - Plasa Călărași
  - Plasa Căzănești
  - Plasa Dragoș-Vodă
  - Plasa Fetești
  - Plasa Lehliu
  - Plasa Slobozia
  - Plasa Țăndărei
  - Plasa Urziceni
- Județul Brăila (Brăila)
  - Municipiul Brăila
  - Plasa Ianca
  - Plasa I.C. Brătianu
  - Plasa Lacu Sărat
  - Plasa Viziru
- Județul Constanța (Constanța)
  - Municipiul Constanța
  - Orașul Carmen-Sylva
  - Orașul Cernavodă
  - Orașul Eforie
  - Orașul Hârșova
  - Orașul Mangalia
  - Orașul Medgidia
  - Orașul Ostrov
  - Orașul Techirghiol
  - Plasa Adamclisi
  - Plasa Cernavodă
  - Plasa Cogealac
  - Plasa Constanța
  - Plasa Hârșova
  - Plasa Mangalia
  - Plasa Medgidia
  - Plasa Negru-Vodă
  - Plasa Ostrov
- Județul Tulcea (Tulcea)
  - Orașul Tulcea
  - Orașul Babadag
  - Orașul Isaccea
  - Orașul Măcin
  - Orașul Sulina
  - Plasa Babadag
  - Plasa Măcin
  - Plasa Sulina
  - Plasa Topolog
  - Plasa Tulcea
- Județul Covurlui (Galați)
  - Municipiul Galați
  - Plasa Bujor-Târgu Bujor
  - Plasa Foltești
  - Plasa Independența
- Județul Putna (Focșani)
  - Orașul Focșani
  - Orașul Mărășești
  - Orașul Adjud
  - Orașul Panciu
  - Orașul Odobești
  - Plasa Adjud
  - Plasa Focșani
  - Plasa Năruja
  - Plasa Odobești
  - Plasa Panciu
  - Plasa Vidra
- Județul Tecuci (Tecuci)
  - Orașul Tecuci
  - Plasa Homocea
  - Plasa Ivești
  - Plasa Nicorești
  - Plasa Podu Turcului
  - Plasa Stănișești
- Județul Tutova (Bârlad)
  - Orașul Bârlad
  - Plasa Ghidgeni
  - Plasa Murgeni
  - Plasa Puești
  - Plasa Zorleni
- Județul Fălciu (Huși)
  - Orașul Huși
  - Orașul Fălciu
  - Plasa Epureni
  - Plasa Fălciu
  - Plasa Răducăneni
- Județul Vaslui (Vaslui)
  - Orașul Vaslui
  - Plasa Codăești
  - Plasa Negrești
  - Plasa Pungești
  - Plasa Vaslui
- Județul Bacău (Bacău)
  - Orașul Bacău
  - Orașul Moinești
  - Orașul Târgu Ocna
  - Orașul Băile Slănic
  - Plasa Bacău
  - Plasa Moinești
  - Plasa Parincea
  - Plasa Răcăciuni
  - Plasa Târgu Ocna
  - Plasa Tescani
  - Plasa Traian
- Județul Neamț (Piatra Neamț)
  - Orașul Piatra Neamț
  - Orașul Buhuși
  - Orașul Târgu Neamț
  - Plasa Buhuși
  - Plasa Ceahlău
  - Plasa Piatra Neamț
  - Plasa Ștefan cel Mare
  - Plasa Târgu Neamț
- Județul Roman (Roman)
  - Orașul Roman
  - Plasa Dămienești
  - Plasa Mircești
  - Plasa Porcești
  - Plasa Târgu Bâra
- Județul Baia (Fălticeni)
  - Orașul Fălticeni
  - Orașul Pașcani
  - Plasa Boroaia
  - Plasa Dolhasca
  - Plasa Mălini
  - Plasa Pașcani
- Județul Iași (Iași)
  - Municipiul Iași
  - Orașul Târgu Frumos
  - Plasa Bivolari
  - Plasa Buciumi
  - Plasa Copou-Târgu Copou
  - Plasa Galata
  - Plasa Podu Iloaiei
  - Plasa Târgu Frumos
- Județul Botoșani (Botoșani)
  - Orașul Botoșani
  - Orașul Hârlău
  - Orașul Ștefănești/Ștefănești-Prut
  - Plasa Botoșani
  - Plasa Bucecea
  - Plasa Sulița
  - Plasa Ștefănești-Prut

II. Bukovina Governorate (northern part was occupied by the Soviet Union in 1940-1941)

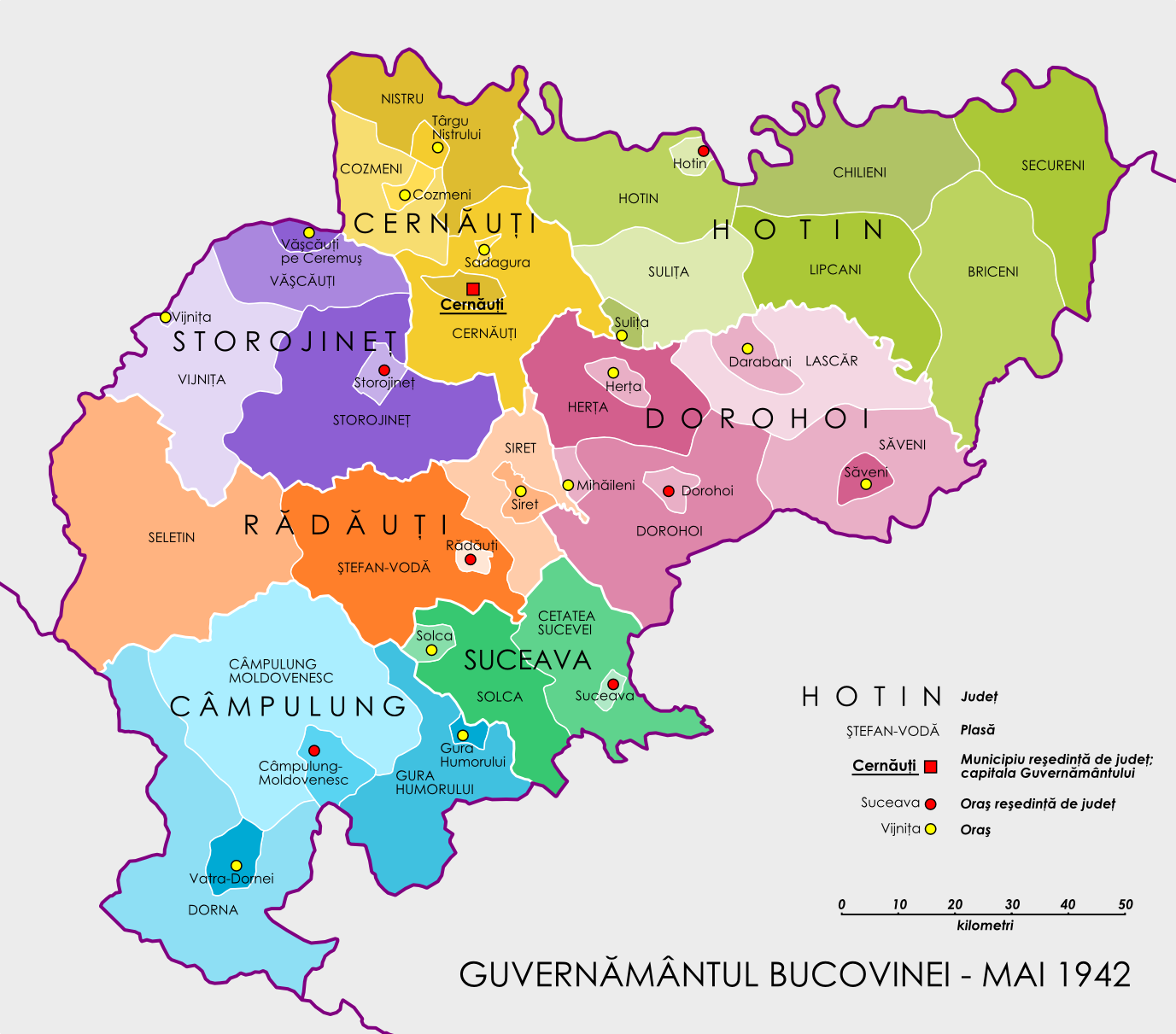
The Bukovina Governorate in 1942

- Județul Dorohoi (Dorohoi)
  - Orașul Dorohoi
  - Orașul Darabani
  - Orașul Herța
  - Orașul Mihăileni
  - Orașul Săveni
  - Plasa Dorohoi
  - Plasa Herța
  - Plasa Lascăr-Darabani
  - Plasa Săveni
- Județul Suceava (Suceava)
  - Orașul Suceava
  - Orașul Solca
  - Plasa Cetatea Sucevei-Suceava
  - Plasa Solca
- Județul Câmpulung (Câmpulung)
  - Orașul Câmpulung Moldovenesc
  - Orașul Gura Humorului
  - Orașul Vatra Dornei
  - Plasa Câmpulung Moldovenesc
  - Plasa Gura Humorului
  - Plasa Vatra Dornei
- Județul Rădăuți (Rădăuți)
  - Orașul Rădăuți
  - Orașul Siret
  - Plasa Seletin
  - Plasa Siret
  - Plasa Ștefan Vodă-Rădăuţi
- Județul Storojineț (Storojineț)
  - Orașul Storojineț
  - Orașul Vășcăuți/Vășcăuți pe Ceremuș
  - Orașul Vijnița
  - Plasa Storojineț
  - Plasa Vășcăuți
  - Plasa Vijnița
- Județul Cernăuți (Cernăuți)
  - Municipiul Cernăuți
  - Orașul Cozmeni
  - Orașul Sadagura
  - Orașul Târgu Nistrului
  - Plasa Cernăuți
  - Plasa Cozmeni
  - Plasa Nistru-Târgu Nistrului
- Județul Hotin (Hotin)
  - Orașul Hotin
  - Orașul Sulița/Târgu Sulița
  - Plasa Briceni
  - Plasa Chilieni
  - Plasa Hotin
  - Plasa Lipcani
  - Plasa Secureni
  - Plasa Sulița/Târgu Sulița

III. Bessarabia Governorate (the region was occupied by the Soviet Union in 1940-1941)

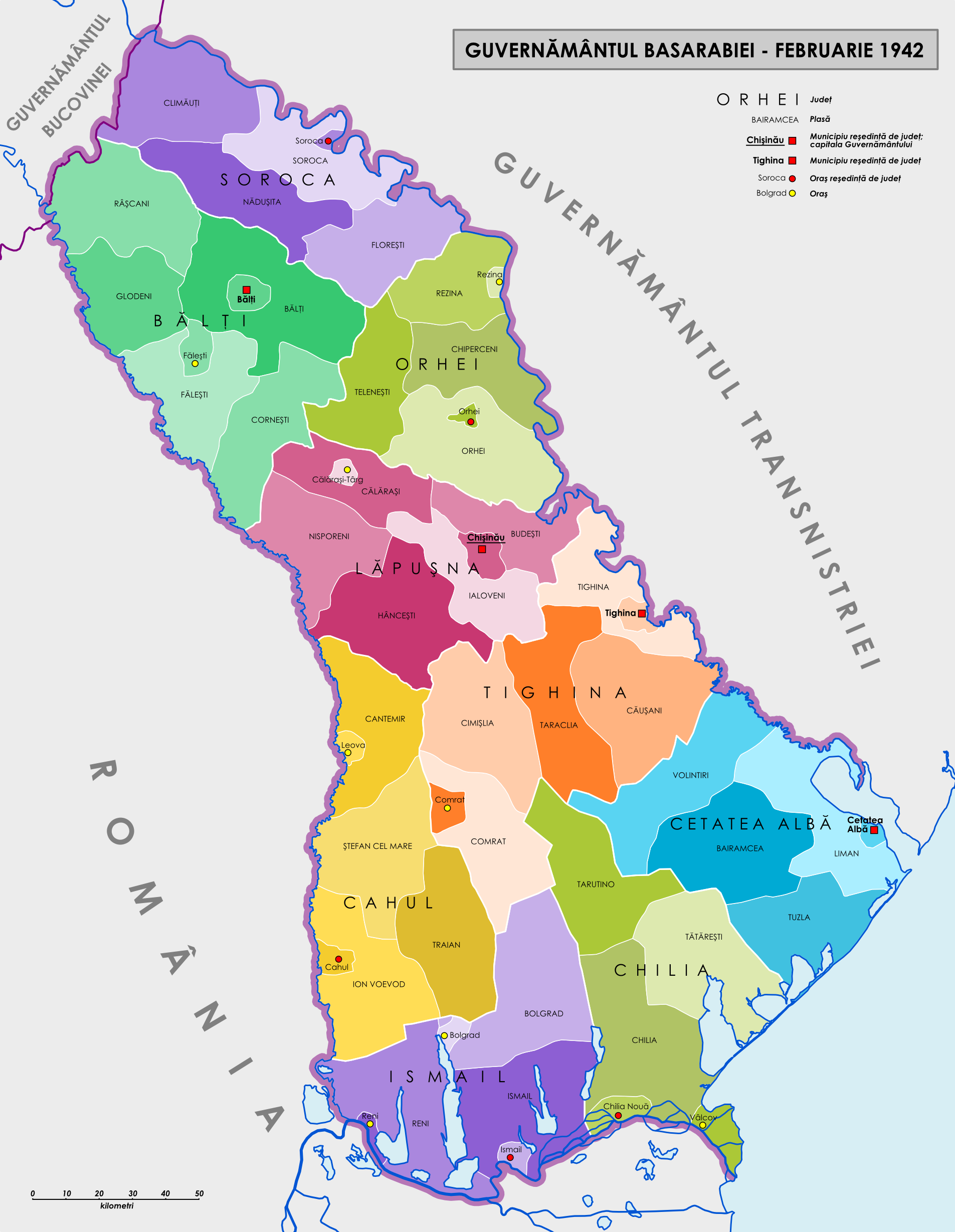
The Bessarabia Governorate in 1942

- Județul Soroca (Soroca)
  - Orașul Soroca
  - Plasa Climăuți-Lipnic
  - Plasa Florești
  - Plasa Nădușita-Drochia
  - Plasa Soroca
- Județul Bălți (Bălți)
  - Municipiul Bălți
  - Orașul Fălești
  - Plasa Bălți
  - Plasa Cornești
  - Plasa Fălești
  - Plasa Glodeni
  - Plasa Râșcani
- Județul Orhei (Orhei)
  - Orașul Orhei
  - Orașul Rezina
  - Plasa Chiperceni
  - Plasa Orhei
  - Plasa Rezina
  - Plasa Telenești
- Județul Lăpușna (Chișinău)
  - Municipiul Chișinău
  - Orașul Călărași-Târg
  - Plasa Budești-Chişinău
  - Plasa Călărași-Călăraşi-Târg
  - Plasa Hâncești
  - Plasa Ialoveni
  - Plasa Nisporeni
- Județul Tighina (Tighina)
  - Municipiul Tighina
  - Orașul Comrat
  - Plasa Căușani
  - Plasa Comrat
  - Plasa Cimișlia
  - Plasa Taraclia
  - Plasa Tighina
- Județul Cahul (Cahul)
  - Orașul Cahul
  - Orașul Leova
  - Plasa Cantemir-Leova
  - Plasa Ion Voevod-Cahul
  - Plasa Ștefan cel Mare-Baimaclia
  - Plasa Traian-Taraclia
- Județul Ismail (Ismail)
  - Orașul Ismail
  - Orașul Bolgrad
  - Orașul Reni
  - Plasa Bolgrad
  - Plasa Ismail
  - Plasa Reni
- Județul Chilia (Chilia Nouă)
  - Orașul Chilia Nouă
  - Orașul Vâlcov
  - Plasa Chilia
  - Plasa Tarutino
  - Plasa Tătărești
- Județul Cetatea Albă (Cetatea Albă)
  - Municipiul Cetatea Albă
  - Plasa Bairamcea
  - Plasa Liman-Cetatea Albă
  - Plasa Tuzla
  - Plasa Volintiri

== Transnistria Governorate ==
The Transnistria Governorate

Transnistria was under Romanian administration, but it was not integrated into Romania.

- Județul Moghilău (Moghilău)
  - Orașul Moghilău
  - Orașul Șmerinca
  - Raionul Balchi
  - Raionul Copaigorod
  - Raionul Crasnoe
  - Raionul Iarișev
  - Raionul Sargorod
  - Raionul Șmerinca
  - Raionul Stanislavcic
- Județul Tulcin (Tulcin)
  - Orașul Tulcin
  - Raionul Braslav
  - Raionul Spicov
  - Raionul Trostineț
  - Raionul Tulcin
- Județul Jugastru (Iampol)
  - Orașul Iampol
  - Raionul Cernovăț
  - Raionul Crijopol
  - Raionul Iampol
  - Raionul Tomaspol
- Județul Balta (Balta)
  - Orașul Balta
  - Orașul Berșad
  - Raionul Balta
  - Raionul Berșad
  - Raionul Cicelnic
  - Raionul Obadovca
  - Raionul Olgopol
  - Raionul Pesceana
  - Raionul Savrani
- Județul Râbnița (Râbnița)
  - Orașul Bârzula
  - Orașul Râbnița
  - Raionul Bârzula
  - Raionul Camenca
  - Raionul Codâma
  - Raionul Piesceanca
  - Raionul Râbnița
- Județul Golta (Golta)
  - Orașul Golta
  - Raionul Crivoe-Oziero
  - Raionul Domaniovca
  - Raionul Golta
  - Raionul Liubașovca
  - Raionul Vradievca
- Județul Ananiev (Ananiev)
  - Orașul Ananiev
  - Raionul Ananiev
  - Raionul Cernova
  - Raionul Petroverovca
  - Raionul Sfânta Troițca
  - Raionul Siraievo
  - Raionul Valea Hoțului
- Județul Dubăsari (Dubăsari)
  - Orașul Dubăsari
  - Orașul Grigoriopol
  - Raionul Ciorna
  - Raionul Dubăsari
  - Raionul Grigoriopol
  - Raionul Ocna
  - Raionul Zaharievca
- Județul Tiraspol (Tiraspol)
  - Municipiul Tiraspol
  - Raionul Grosulova
  - Raionul Razdelnaia
  - Raionul Selz
  - Raionul Slobozia
  - Raionul Tebricovo
  - Raionul Tiraspol
- Județul Ovidiopol (Ovidiopol)
  - Orașul Ovidiopol
  - Raionul Balaevca
  - Raionul Franzfeld
  - Raionul Ovidiopol
  - Raionul Vigoda
- Județul Odessa (Odessa)
  - Municipiul Odessa
  - Raionul Antono-Codincevo
  - Raionul Blagujevo
  - Raionul Ianovca
  - Raionul Odessa
- Județul Berezovca (Berezovca)
  - Orașul Berezovca
  - Raionul Berezovca
  - Raionul Landau
  - Raionul Mostovoi
  - Raionul Veselinovo
- Județul Oceacov (Oceacov)
  - Orașul Oceacov
  - Raionul Crasna
  - Raionul Oceacov
  - Raionul Varvarovca
