= Domanovka concentration camp =

Romanian-run concentration camp in occupied Ukraine during World War II

Domanovka
- Concentration camp
- Location: Domanovka, Transnistria Governorate (now Domanivka, Ukraine)
- Operated by: Kingdom of Romania
- Operational: 1941–1944
- Inmates: Primarily Jews
- Killed: About 18,000

The Domanovka concentration camp was a Romanian-administered concentration camp and mass killing site for Jews at Domanovka, present-day Domanivka in Mykolaiv Oblast, Ukraine, within the Romanian-occupied Transnistria Governorate during World War II. It was located near the Southern Bug.

Domanovka was one of the principal camps and killing sites in Golta County, together with Bogdanovka and Akhmetchetkha, during the Holocaust in Romania. Approximately 20,000 Jews from Odesa and the surrounding area were held at Domanovka, of whom about 18,000 were killed between January and March 1942.

== Mass killings ==
The killings at Domanovka followed the mass murder of Jews at Bogdanovka in December 1941. The camps in Golta County had become severely overcrowded, while outbreaks of typhus spread among Jewish deportees. Romanian authorities invoked the epidemic and the conditions in the camps in connection with the mass killing of prisoners.

The principal killing operation at Domanovka began on 10 January 1942. Approximately 20,000 Jews from Odesa and the surrounding area were being held there. Between 10 January and 18 March, Romanian gendarmes and local Ukrainian police killed about 18,000 prisoners.

The victims' bodies were initially buried. Romanian authorities subsequently ordered their exhumation and burning because of fears that the large number of corpses would contribute to the spread of disease.

Deportations continued during the killing operations. Jews arriving in later convoys were subjected to selections at Domanovka, with skilled workers temporarily separated from other deportees while the killings continued.

== Survivors ==
Some prisoners survived the principal killing operations and remained at Domanovka. The Ghetto Fighters' House archives document Holocaust survivors from Odesa who had been interned at the camp and state that more than 18,000 Jews were killed there.

== See also ==
- Grosulovo internment camp
- Pechora concentration camp
- Vapniarka concentration camp
