= Domanivka =

Rural locality in Mykolaiv Oblast, Ukraine

Domanivka Доманівка
- Rural settlement
- Location of Domanivka Domanivka (Mykolaiv Oblast)
- Coordinates: 47°37′39″N 30°58′43″E
- Country: Ukraine
- Oblast: Mykolaiv Oblast
- Raion: Voznesensk Raion

Population (2022)
  - Total: 5,728
- Time zone: UTC+2 (EET)
  - Summer (DST): UTC+3 (EEST)

Domanivka (Ukrainian: Доманівка, Russian: Доманёвка) is a rural settlement in Voznesensk Raion in the west of Mykolaiv Oblast, Ukraine. It hosts the administration of Domanivka settlement hromada, one of the hromadas of Ukraine. Population: 5,728 (2022 estimate).

Domanivka is located on the banks of the Chortala River, a left tributary of the Southern Bug.

== History ==
On 16 April 1920, Odessa Governorate was established. Domanivka was the center of Domanivskaya Volost and belonged to Voznesensky Uyezd of Kherson Governorate. In 1923, uyezds in Ukrainian Soviet Socialist Republic were abolished, and the governorates were divided into okruhas. In 1923, Kantakuzynka Raion with the administrative center in the selo of Kantakuzynka was established, and Domanivka became the part of the raion. It belonged to Pervomaisk Okruha. In 1925, the governorates were abolished, and okruhas were directly subordinated to Ukrainian SSR. On 3 February 1926, Katakuzynka Raion was renamed Domanivka Raion, and the center was moved to Domanivka. In 1930, okruhas were abolished, and on 27 February 1932, Odessa Oblast was established, and Domanivka Raion was included into Odessa Oblast.

During World War II, 14,000-18,000 overwhelmingly local Transnistrian Jews were murdered on the spot in Domanivka the winter of 1941-1942, until February 1942. Many thousands of them were from Odessa. A minority of the Jews who were killed were Bessarabian Jews. The victims were killed, mainly by the Romanian constabulary, the Romanian army supported by Ukrainian militia and the Sonderkommando. After the occupation of Transnistria by the Germans in World War II, and under Ion Antonescu, the ruler of Romania in October 1941, an extermination camp was established in Domanovka, where thousands of Jews were murdered. The camp was liberated on March 28, 1944, by the Red Army. According to Jean Ancel, "about five hundred Jews were still alive, mostly expellees from Romania." Among the main perpetrators of crime in Transnistria were the Romanian army and police. Their actions stemmed from their political support for Germany and the Nazis during World War II. The Romanian policy in the Transnistria camp carried through starvation, forced camps, mass shootings, and more. For more information on the Holocaust in Transnistria, including on the fate of the Jewish deportees from Romania, including Bessarabia, see History of the Jews in Transnistria.

In February 1954, Domanivka Raion was transferred to Mykolaiv Oblast. In 1956, Domanivka was granted urban-type settlement status.

On 18 July 2020, Domanivka Raion was abolished as part of the administrative reform of Ukraine, which reduced the number of raions of Mykolaiv Oblast to four. The area of Domanivka Raion was merged into Voznesensk Raion. On 26 January 2024, a new law entered into force which abolished the status of urban-type settlement status, and Domanivka became a rural settlement.

== Economy ==
=== Transportation ===
The closest railway station, 24 kilometres (15 mi) east of the settlement, is in Voznesensk, on the railway line connecting Odesa and Pomichna.

== See also ==
- History of the Jews in Bessarabia
- History of the Jews in Transnistria
- History of the Jews in Odesa
- Vapniarka concentration camp
- Bogdanovka concentration camp
