= Obodivka internment camp =

Romanian-run internment and transit camp in occupied Ukraine during World War II

Obodivka
- Internment camp and transit camp
- Location: Obodivka, Transnistria Governorate (now Ukraine)
- Operated by: Kingdom of Romania
- Operational: 1941–1944
- Inmates: Primarily Jews

The Obodivka concentration camp, also known as the Obodovka camp (Romanian: Obodovca), was a Romanian-administered internment and transit camp for Jews at Obodivka in the Transnistria Governorate during World War II. The camp was established in the autumn of 1941 after Romania occupied the region and deported Jews from Bessarabia and Bukovina to Transnistria.

German and Romanian forces occupied Obodivka on 28 July 1941, and the town came under Romanian civil administration in September. Convoys of deported Jews began arriving in October and early November 1941. By mid-November, an estimated 10,000 deportees had reached the town. Some were subsequently sent elsewhere, while others were confined in a transit camp established in the damaged stables and cowsheds of a Soviet collective farm.

The buildings lacked windows, doors, heating, running water, toilets and beds. Prisoners faced overcrowding, hunger, cold and disease, and many died during the winter of 1941–1942. Survivor Israel Parikman recalled that deportees were housed in stables and pigsties and that the frozen ground sometimes made it impossible to bury those who died.

Obodivka was one of numerous sites established by Romanian authorities in Transnistria for Jews deported from Romanian-controlled territories. Romanian authorities created approximately 150 improvised ghettos and camps in Transnistria, where tens of thousands of Jews died from starvation, exposure, disease and maltreatment.
