= Slobidka, Odesa =

Historic neighbourhood of Odesa, Ukraine

Slobidka Слобідка
- Neighbourhood
- Location in Odesa Oblast Slobidka (Ukraine)
- Coordinates: 46°29′30″N 30°42′00″E
- Country: Ukraine
- Oblast: Odesa Oblast
- City: Odesa

Slobidka (Ukrainian: Слобідка; Russian: Слободка, romanized: Slobodka), historically known as Slobidka-Romanivka or Slobodka-Romanovka, is a historic neighbourhood of Odesa, Ukraine. The settlement developed on the outskirts of Odesa during the 1820s. During the Romanian occupation of Odesa in World War II, the neighbourhood was the location of the Slobidka ghetto, in which thousands of Jews were confined before being deported to other parts of the Transnistria Governorate.

== History ==
Slobidka-Romanivka was established in the 1820s outside central Odesa. Many early residents worked at the city's port. Settlers received small plots of land, and the neighbourhood developed a pattern of narrow blocks.

=== Slobidka ghetto ===
Following the Romanian capture of Odesa on 16 October 1941, the city became part of the Romanian-administered Transnistria Governorate. Romanian authorities and German forces carried out mass killings of Odesa's Jewish population during the following weeks.

By 25 October 1941, approximately 25,000 Jews, including survivors of the massacres in Odesa and Dalnyk, had been confined in the Slobidka ghetto. Prisoners faced overcrowding, food shortages and exposure to cold weather.

In late December 1941, Romanian leader Ion Antonescu ordered the removal of the remaining Jewish population from Odesa. The governor of Transnistria, Gheorghe Alexianu, subsequently ordered their deportation to rural areas of the governorate. On 10 January 1942, Romanian authorities ordered all Jews remaining in Odesa to report to the Slobidka ghetto within two days. The ghetto was then used as an assembly point for deportations.

Romanian gendarmes, sometimes assisted by German guards, marched groups of prisoners more than 10 kilometres (6.2 mi) from Slobidka and other assembly points to railway stations. Deportees were transported in unheated railway cars, principally to Berezivka County, approximately 90 kilometres (56 mi) north of Odesa. More than 31,000 Jews were deported from Odesa during January and February 1942. Many died during the deportations because of exposure to cold, inadequate food and the confiscation of clothing.

Surviving deportees were taken to camps and killing sites in Berezivka County, where ethnic German militia units murdered thousands of Jews. Smaller deportations from Odesa continued during the spring of 1942. By April, only 701 registered Jews remained in the city. The Slobidka ghetto was closed on 10 June 1942, and the last deportation train from Odesa departed on 23 June.

The Red Army recaptured Odesa on 10 April 1944.

== See also ==
- The Holocaust in Romania
