= Transnistria Governorate =

Portion of Ukraine during World War II

Transnistria Governorate Guvernământul Transnistriei
- Governorate of Romania
- 1941–1944
- Flag Coat of arms

- Administrative map of the Transnistria Governorate
- Capital: Odesa
- Area
  - 1941: 39,733 km^{2} (15,341 sq mi)
- Population
  - 1941: 2,326,226
- Government
  - Type: Military–civilian administration
- Governor
  - 1941–1944: Gheorghe Alexianu
  - 1944: Gheorghe Potopeanu
- Historical era: World War II
  - Established: 19 August 1941
  - Disestablished: 1 April 1944
Preceded by
Ukrainian SSR
Moldavian SSR
Succeeded by
Ukrainian SSR
Moldavian SSR
Army Group Rear Area Command
- Today part of: Moldova (Transnistria); Ukraine

The Transnistria Governorate (Romanian: Guvernământul Transnistriei) was a Romanian-administered territory between the Dniester and Southern Bug, conquered by the Axis powers from the Soviet Union during Operation Barbarossa. A Romanian civilian administration governed the territory from 19 August 1941 to 29 January 1944. A brief military administration followed, during which the Romanians withdrew from the region by late March 1944. German control became official on 1 April 1944.

Limited in the west by the Dniester river (separating it from Bessarabia), in the east by the Southern Bug river (separating it from the German Reichskommissariat Ukraine), and in the south by the Black Sea, it comprised the present-day region of Transnistria (which compared to the World War II in whole is only a small strip along the bank of the Dniester) and territories further east (modern Odesa Oblast eastward of the Dniester, southern Vinnytsia Oblast and a small part of Mykolaiv Oblast), including the Black Sea port of Odesa, which became the administrative capital of Transnistria during World War II.

In World War II, the Kingdom of Romania, persuaded and aided by Nazi Germany, took control of Transnistria for the first time in history. In August 1941, Adolf Hitler persuaded Ion Antonescu to take control of the territory as a substitute for Northern Transylvania, occupied by Miklós Horthy's Hungary following the Second Vienna Award. Despite the Romanian administration, the Kingdom of Romania did not formally incorporate Transnistria into its administrative framework for reasons explained below.

== Romanian conquest of Transnistria ==
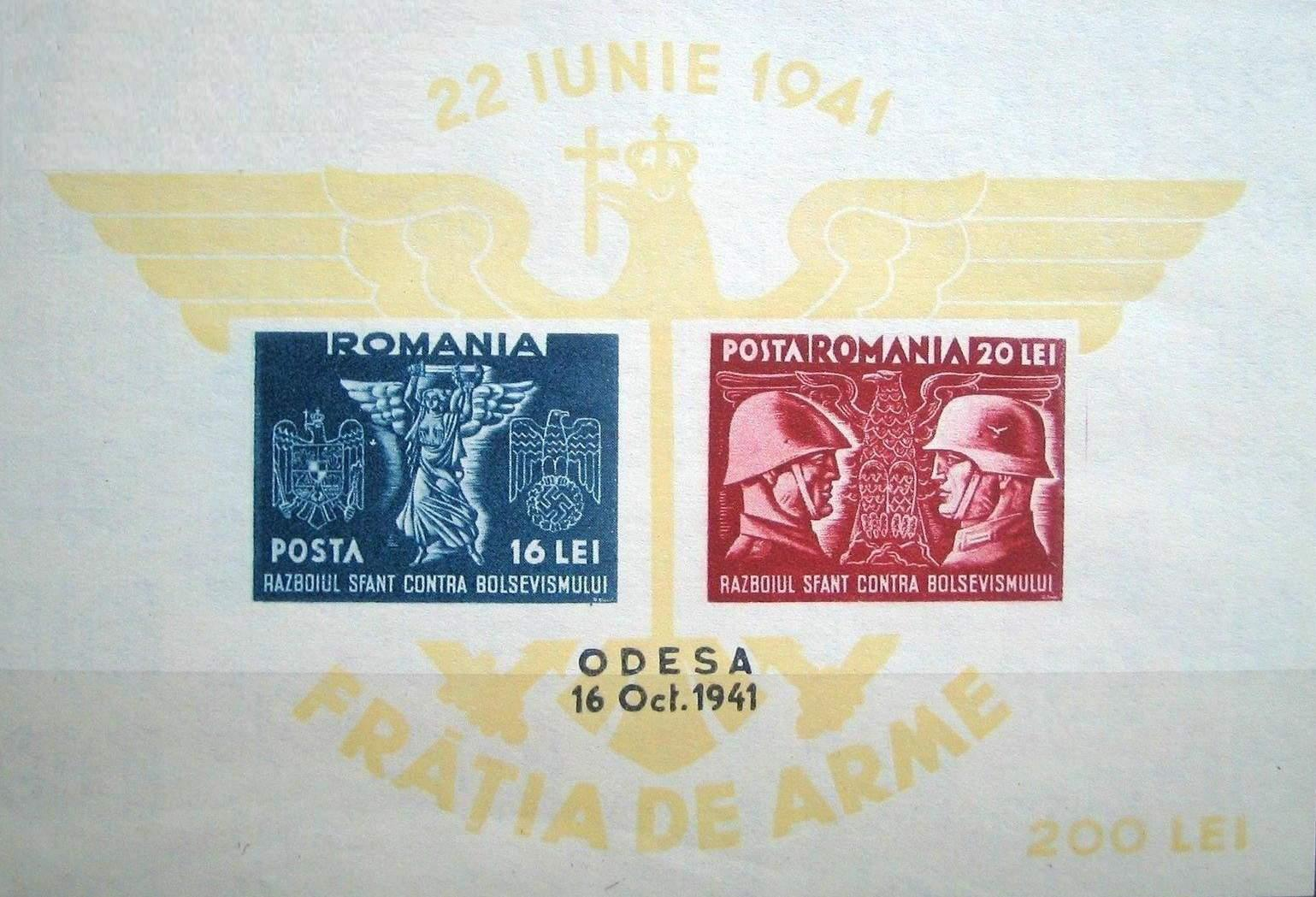
1941 Romanian stamp commemorating the Fall of Odessa and the "Crusade against Bolshevism".

Following the Soviet occupation of Bessarabia and Northern Bukovina, a strong concentration of Soviet troops became present on the border with Romania. Nazi Germany wanted Romania as an ally in the war against the Soviet Union for fear that the Soviets were a threat to the Romanian oilfields. Romania in turn aligned their foreign policy with Germany for an assurance against the Soviet Union. With regards to Operation Barbarossa, Antonescu accepted Hitler's ideas that the conflict was a "race war" between the Aryans, represented by the Nordic Germans and Latin Romanians on the Axis side vs. the Slavs and Asians, commanded by the Jews on the Soviet side. Romania in turn committed two armies for the invasion of the Soviet Union, totaling over 300,000 troops between them. For their commitment, Romania was promised Bessarabia, Northern Bukovina and the area between Dniester and Southern Bug. On 19 August 1941, Germany and Romania signed an agreement placing Transnistria under the authority of the latter. Altogether, the area amounted to 39,733 square km.

=== Antonescu's personal project ===
The creation of a separate Romanian occupation area was Ion Antonescu's initiative. German leadership was divided about allowing Romania such privilege. Even Hitler, who encouraged Romanian eastward expansion, originally meant to award eastern territories after the war. However, Antonescu's stubborn insistence eventually swayed the Germans. While refusing to declare Transnistria's annexation, Antonescu instructed its governor to work in Transnistria "as if Romania had been installed in those territories for two million years". Part of Romania's grand strategy was to use Transnistria as a bargaining chip at the end of the war to obtain various gains, from Russia or Ukraine or possibly from Germany and Hungary. Romania's immediate aims, however, stemmed from Ion Antonescu's acute inferiority complex. His perception was that his beloved country was being looked down upon by other European countries. From his perspective, raising Romania's ranking required it ruling over other peoples, in an orderly, efficient and "civilized" manner, comparable to how other European states ruled over their Asian and African subjects. According to Antonescu's own words: "Yes. The whole prestige of this country is engaged in Transnistria. We have to demonstrate that we are able to administer a larger country.". Civil service in Transnistria would paradoxically surpass in quality its counterpart within Romania itself. On 19 August 1941, Antonescu decreed the creation of the Romanian Administration in Transnistria.

=== Siege of Odessa ===
During the first week of the advance, in mid-August 1941, Romanian forces took over all of the region, except for a small area around Odessa, without a fight. At the time, the Romanians had 60,000 soldiers to conquer the city from its 34,000 defenders. However, the organization was so poor, and the command was so superficial, that the initial assault on the city failed, resulting in a siege. Exploiting this success, the Soviets bolstered the cities defenses with naval marines, warships and paratroopers. Multiple assaults by the Romanian Fourth Army failed and a siege ensured. German forces were brought into the reinforce the attackers and eventually in October 1941 after two months of fighting, the Romanian army took control of the city. Casualties were significant with Romanian losses standing at 90,020 casualties.

Once Romanian troops entered Odessa, they established the headquarters of two of their divisions in the local NKVD building. However, the building was mined by the Soviets, who blew it up, killing over 61 troops, including 16 officers and one general. In reprisal, Ion Antonescu ordered the arrest and massacre of civilians suspected of aiding the Red Army. When it became clear that identifying individuals directly responsible for the incident would be almost impossible, Antonescu ordered the shooting of Jews. The massacre that followed resulted in 100,000 civilians killed, the majority of whom had nothing to do with the military action. A further number of Odessa Jews were deported to ghettos and concentration camps in the northern half of the region.

A Soviet partisan movement was active in the Odessa catacombs from October 1941 to 1944 with varying levels of activity. Romanian troops attempted to flush the partisans out with chemical weapons and by sealing off as many exits as they could. The catacombs were never completely cleared, however the impact of these partisan movements were not significant.

=== Diplomatic clashes with the Germans ===
The borders of Transnistria were for the most part natural and self-evident: the Black Sea (south) along with the rivers Bug (east) and Nistru (west). The problem of Transnistria's northern border caused some friction between the Germans and Romanians. The latter wanted to push the border north of the town of Zhmerynka (Romanian: Jmerinca), a strategically important railway hub. The Germans resisted at first, but ultimately conceded. Another point of contention was Antonescu's decision to create a civil administration for the region, directly subordinated to himself. This effectively removed the region's administration from Wehrmacht control. Although consternated, the Germans could only acquiesce. Initially, the railways in the region remained under German control. After months of negotiations, the railways were taken over by the Romanian State in March 1942. The Romanians initially agreed to leave the port of Odessa under German control. This was because there were not enough Romanian engineers to repair the Soviet-inflicted damage. According to Antonescu, Hitler asked his permission to let the Germans use the port, implying recognition for Romania's sovereignty. On 10 June 1942, the Romanians gained control of the port of Odessa from the Germans. From early October 1942 to the end of their rule over the region, the Romanians had no major problems with the Germans.

== Status with respect to Romania proper ==
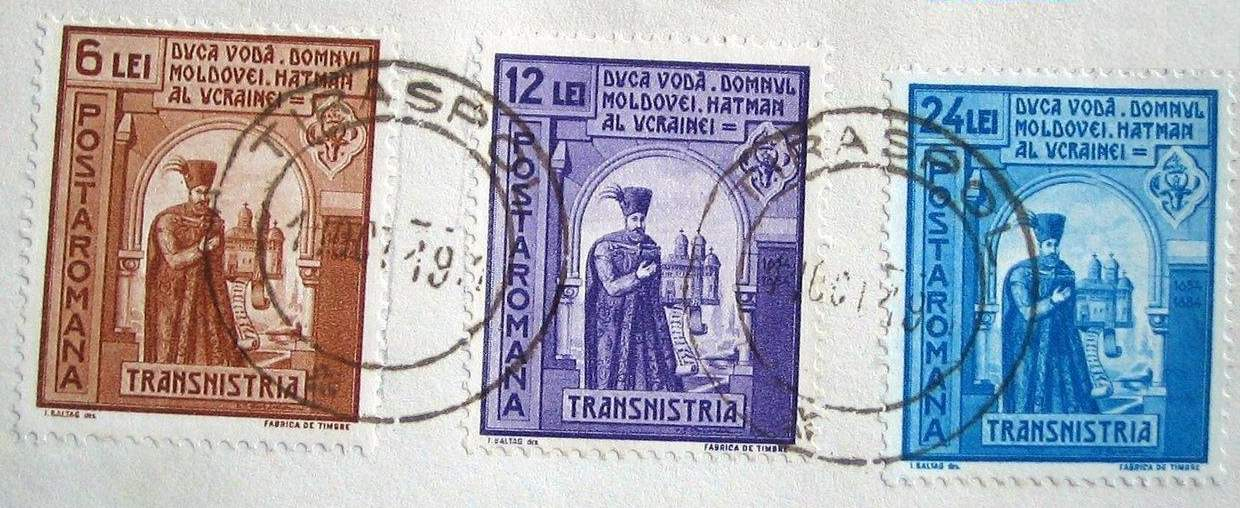
Romanian stamps from late 1941 issued for Transnistria

Albeit not annexing the region outright, the Romanian Antonescu government organized the territory in the Guvernământul Transnistriei under Romanian governor, Gheorghe Alexianu.

According to Trașcă, the Nazi-allied Antonescu government hoped to annex the territory eventually, but developments on the Eastern Front precluded it. Axworthy, on the other hand, writes that Hitler "tried repeatedly" to convince Antonescu to annex the territory as a substitute for Northern Transylvania, but the Romanian wartime leader refused to do so until the war was over and a plebiscite had been held. Antonescu's policy was to refuse German-awarded territories that did not have a large enough Romanian population (Romanians composed only 11% of Transnistria's), as he had previously done with Transcarpathia and Western Banat. According to Axworthy, Romania refused a German offer to annex part of Transcarpathia after the occupation of Czechoslovakia and another offer to occupy Western Banat during the invasion of Yugoslavia. Antonescu's primary interest in Transnistria was to use it as a bargaining counter for the return of Northern Transylvania to Romania, having Hungary receive Galicia as compensation and Germany occupy Transnistria. Germany rejected the offer.

Romanian opposition parties were against Romanian operations beyond Bessarabia and Bukovina. Two eminent political figures of the day, Iuliu Maniu and Constantin Brătianu, declared that "the Romanian people will never consent to the continuation of the struggle beyond our national borders."

== Administrative divisions ==
The counties and lower level administrative divisions of Romania (1942), Transnistria included.

The territory was divided into 13 counties (Romanian: județe). Their subdivisions were named municipiu ("municipality"), oraș ("city") and raion ("raion").

=== Counties ===
- Ananiev/Ananiu (Ananiv)
- Balta (Balta)
- Berezovca (Berezivka)
- Dubăsari
- Golta (Golta)
- Jugastru (Yampil)
- Movilău/Moghilău (Mohyliv-Podilskyi)
- Oceacov (Ochakiv)
- Odesa (Odesa)
- Ovidiopol (Ovidiopol)
- Rîbnița/Râmnița
- Tiraspol
- Tulcin (Tulchyn)

=== Raions and towns ===
- Județul Movilău/Moghilău (Movilău)
  - Orașul Movilău/Moghilău/Moghilev
  - Orașul Șmerinca
  - Raionul Balchi
  - Raionul Copaigorod
  - Raionul Crasnoe
  - Raionul Iarișev
  - Raionul Sargorod
  - Raionul Șmerinca
  - Raionul Stanislavcic
- Județul Tulcin (Tulcin)
  - Orașul Tulcin (also Tulcea Nouă)
  - Raionul Șmerinca
  - Raionul Braslav
  - Raionul Spicov
  - Raionul Trostineț
  - Raionul Tulcin
- Județul Jugastru (Iampol)
  - Orașul Iampol
  - Raionul Cernovăț
  - Raionul Crijopol
  - Raionul Iampol
  - Raionul Tomaspol
- Județul Balta (Balta)
  - Orașul Balta
  - Orașul Berșad
  - Raionul Balta
  - Raionul Berșad
  - Raionul Cicelnic
  - Raionul Obadovca
  - Raionul Olgopol
  - Raionul Pesceana
  - Raionul Savrani
- Județul Râbnița/Râmnița (Râbnița)
  - Orașul Bârzula
  - Orașul Râbnița/Râmnița
  - Raionul Bârzula
  - Raionul Camenca
  - Raionul Codâma
  - Raionul Piesceanca
  - Raionul Râbnița/Râmnița
- Județul Golta (Golta)
  - Orașul Golta
  - Raionul Crivoe-Oziero
  - Raionul Domaniovca
  - Raionul Golta
  - Raionul Liubașovca
  - Raionul Vradievca
- Județul Ananiev/Ananiu (Ananiev)
  - Orașul Ananiev (also Ananiu, Nani or Târgul Nanelui)
  - Raionul Ananiev/Ananiu
  - Raionul Cernova
  - Raionul Petroverovca
  - Raionul Sfânta Troițca
  - Raionul Siraievo
  - Raionul Valea Hoțului
- Județul Dubăsari (Dubăsari)
  - Orașul Dubăsari
  - Orașul Grigoriopol
  - Raionul Ciorna
  - Raionul Dubăsari
  - Raionul Grigoriopol
  - Raionul Ocna
  - Raionul Zaharievca
- Județul Tiraspol (Tiraspol)
  - Municipiul Tiraspol (also Tirișpolea)
  - Raionul Grosulova
  - Raionul Razdelnaia
  - Raionul Selz
  - Raionul Slobozia
  - Raionul Tebricovo
  - Raionul Tiraspol/Tirișpolea
- Județul Ovidiopol (Ovidiopol)
  - Orașul Ovidiopol
  - Raionul Balaevca
  - Raionul Franzfeld
  - Raionul Ovidiopol
  - Raionul Vigoda
- Județul Odesa (Odesa)
  - Municipiul Odesa (renamed or proposed to be renamed to Antonescu according to multiple sources. Unclear whether officially implemented. A photograph of an opera advert (see below) shows the name Odesa being used in 1942.)
  - Raionul Antono-Codincevo
  - Raionul Blagujevo
  - Raionul Ianovca
  - Raionul Odesa
- Județul Berezovca (Berezovca)
  - Orașul Berezovca
  - Raionul Berezovca
  - Raionul Landau
  - Raionul Mostovoi
  - Raionul Veselinovo
- Județul Oceacov (Oceacov)
  - Orașul Oceacov (archaically Vozia)
  - Raionul Crasna
  - Raionul Oceacov
  - Raionul Varvarovca

== Population ==
In December, 1941 Romanian authorities conducted a census in Transnistria and the ethnic structure was as follows:

Population structure in Romania (Transnistria included) according to the 1941 Romanian census.

Ethnicity	Number	%	Rural	Urban
Ukrainians	1,775,273	76.3	79.9	57.4
Romanians	197,685	8.4	9.3	4.4
Russians	150,842	6.5	2.4	27.9
Germans (namely Black Sea Germans)	126,464	5.4	5.9	2.7
Bulgarians	27,638	1.2	1.1	1.4
Jews	21,852	0.9	0.7	2.0
Poles	13,969	0.6	0.3	2.3
Lipovans	968	–	–	0.1
Tatars	900	–	–	0.1
Others	10,628	0.5	10.2	1.7
Total	2,326,224^{*}	100	1,956,557	369,669

=== Romanian urban population (December, 1941 census) ===
Name	Status	Total population	Romanian population	Romanian proportion
Moghilău	town	13,131	61	0.5%
Șmerinca	town	10,502	29	0.3%
Iampol	town	5,075	20	0.4%
Tulcin	town	3,833	5	0.1%
Bârzula	town	8,812	314	3.6%
Rîbnița	town	6,998	1,575	22.5%
Balta	town	9,538	156	1.6%
Berșad	town	4,361	1	nil%
Dubăsari	town	4,033	1,165	28.9%
Grigoriopol	town	8,553	6,182	72.3%
Ananiev	town	11,562	1,963	17.0%
Golta	town	6,436	61	0.9%
Tiraspol	city	17,014	1,285	7.6%
Ovidiopol	town	4,324	106	2.5%
Odesa	city	244,572	3,224	1.1%
Berezovca	town	6,090	72	1.2%
Oceacov	town	4,835	4	0.1%
Total	–	369,669	16,223	4.4%

=== Romanian population by county (December, 1941 census) ===
Name	Total population	Romanian population	Romanian proportion
Moghilău	293,884	176	0.1%
Jugastru	240,406	74	nil%
Tulcin	147,184	11	nil%
Râbnița	217,403	54,660	25.1%
Balta	255,107	1,111	0.4%
Dubăsari	138,861	56,257	40.5%
Ananiev	142,401	19,748	13.9%
Golta	139,013	4,621	3.6%
Tiraspol	189,809	48,427	25.5%
Ovidiopol	64,576	6,036	9.4%
Odesa	331,369	3,543	1.1%
Berezovca	89,156	2,820	3.2%
Oceacov	76,822	203	0.3%

Romanian authorities used Transnistria as an "ethnic dump" for Jews and Roma from other regions of the country. Beginning in June 1942, Romanian authorities deported over 25,000 ethnic Roma from Bessarabia and Romania proper to Transnistria. During this same time period, over 90,000 Jews were deported from Bessarabia to Transnistria.

== Organization ==
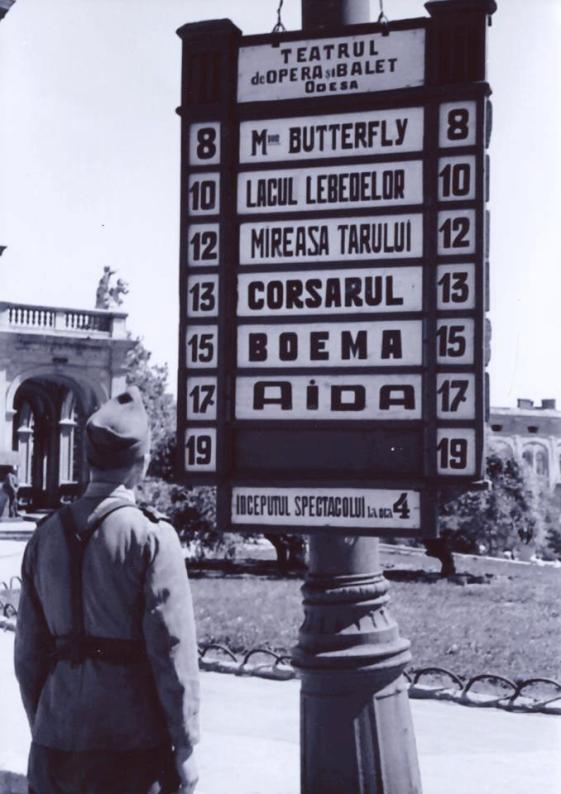
Romanian soldier reading an opera house advert in Odesa, 1942. The photo also demonstrates the spelling of Odesa in 1942.

=== Civilian life ===
The Romanian administration of Transnistria attempted to stabilize the situation in the region during the occupation. To this end, it opened all churches, previously closed down by the Soviets. During 1942–1943, 2,200 primary schools were organized in the region, including 1,677 Ukrainian, 311 Romanian, 150 Russian, 70 German, and 6 Bulgarian. 117 middle and high schools were opened, including 65 middle schools, 29 technical high schools, and 23 academic high schools. Theaters were opened in Odessa and Tiraspol, as well as several museums, libraries, and cinemas throughout the region. On 7 December 1941, the University of Odessa was reopened with 6 faculties – medicine, polytechnical, law, sciences, languages and agricultural engineering.

The Romanian policy of security during 1942–1943 was successful in keeping Transnistria pacified. The ruthless methods applied by the Germans elsewhere were less successful, as evidenced by the attempts of refugees to escape from German to Romanian jurisdiction. Romanian policies in Transnistria amounted to the best food, health and education situation within Axis-occupied Eastern Europe. Under Romanian rule, religious and cultural revivals were permitted, prisoners of war were released and many local Communists were amnestied. This leniency eased local hostility to Romanian occupation after the terror of 1941, also undermining Soviet attempts to recruit partisans. Even while the retreating Romanians were looting Transnistria in March 1944, the local partisans were unable to mobilize civilian support.

Orthodox churches of Transnistria fell into the jurisdiction of the Romanian Orthodox Church. Under the leadership of Metropolitan bishop Visarion Puiu, the Romanian Orthodox Church in addition to opening all churches closed by Soviet authorities, set up three hundred new churches across Transnistria. Romanian clergy removed all Church Slavonic material and implemented the revised Julian calendar.

=== Economy ===
The uncertain political status of Transnistria throughout the Romanian occupation meant no clear economic policy was implemented across Transnistria. In addition to the looting of industrial and agricultural resources, Transnistria served as a colony for cheap labor to be used in mines and to rebuild destroyed infrastructure.

In spite of popular demand, the Romanian administration, following the German example, refused to disband the reviled kolkhozes. Nevertheless, former de-kulakized peasants did get back their houses, although in the cities real estate was not returned to its previous owners. The kolkhoz was renamed obște, and the sovkhozes were renamed "ferme de stat" (state farms). Most of Transnistria's agricultural output was produced by the kolkhozes. Roughly 53,000 railway cars of grain were brought from Transnistria to Romania between September 1942 and June 1943. Without these, as Ion Antonescu admitted, Romania "would have had an enormous crisis". By the end of March 1944, the Romanian administration had reopened 335 of the 946 prewar factories, their products being directed primarily towards the Romanian war effort. By the fall of 1943, a total of 1,593 km (990 miles) of railway tracks had been restored. The Romanian policy encouraged private enterprise. By 31 August 1943, Odessa alone had issued 8,610 licenses for economic activity, including: 1,256 groceries, 1,062 restaurants/cafes and 171 "small industries" such as soap factories. An Odessan named Mikhail Dmitrievich Manuilov was a financial specialist employed by the Soviets and Romanians alike. Although he despised both, he asserted in his postwar memoirs that "life in Odessa gradually improved and its situation was in stark contrast to the situation in the other cities, which were under the German occupation". In their zones of occupation, the Germans practiced a policy of isolating bigger cities from the countryside. This had the dual purpose of increasing German military supplies and depriving millions of supposedly racially inferior Eastern Europeans. The Romanians never even thought along these lines. Odessa was never cut off from its rural hinterland. Such abundance relative to German-occupied areas was not necessarily limited to Odessa. In early January 1944, Tiger Tank Battalion 503 assembled at Zhmerynka, a town in Transnistria. The Germans were pleasantly surprised to find beer in the local bazaar, along with other wares that they had not seen in a long time. In 1943, Transnistrian factories, located mainly in and around Odessa, reported a 76% increase in their industrial output. Roughly 37% of this industry was privatized. A shortage of cash along with inflation resulted in the emergence of barter as the primary form of trade.

== Borders, territory, and administrative hierarchy ==
On 14 August 1941, Hitler wrote to Antonescu, asking the latter to take over the administration between the Dniester and the Dnieper. Antonescu replied three days later, stating that he could only assume responsibility for the area between the Dniester and the Bug, due to lacking "the means and trained staff". The Romanian leader was however willing to supply security troops for the area between the Bug and the Dnieper. The German-Romanian agreement for the creation of Transnistria was signed on 19 August, at Tiraspol. It is known as the Tiraspol Agreement. This treaty was consolidated by a convention signed at Tighina on 30 August (the Tighina Agreement), which however did not clearly define the northern borders of Transnistria. Antonescu claimed the northern towns of Mohyliv-Podilskyi, Zhmerynka and Tulchyn, a request to which Hitler acceded. The final borders were recognized on 4 September, in a German order establishing a boundary between Transnistria and the rear of Army Group South. The resulting territory was divided into 13 counties, each ruled by a high-ranking officer with the role of prefect. A county was further divided into raions, each raion being ruled by a praetor (pretor), who had much broader powers than the prefect. The entire region, forming a single Governorate, was led by one governor, Gheorghe Alexianu. Transnistria's administrative configuration was only settled fully in November 1941. For two months (3 August to 28 October), all of Pervomaisk was under German occupation. On 28 October, Romania took over the part of Pervomaisk located on the western bank of the river Bug and restored its old name (Golta). In November, the seat of Golta County was moved from Kryve Ozero to Golta.

=== Proposals for administration to the Dnieper ===
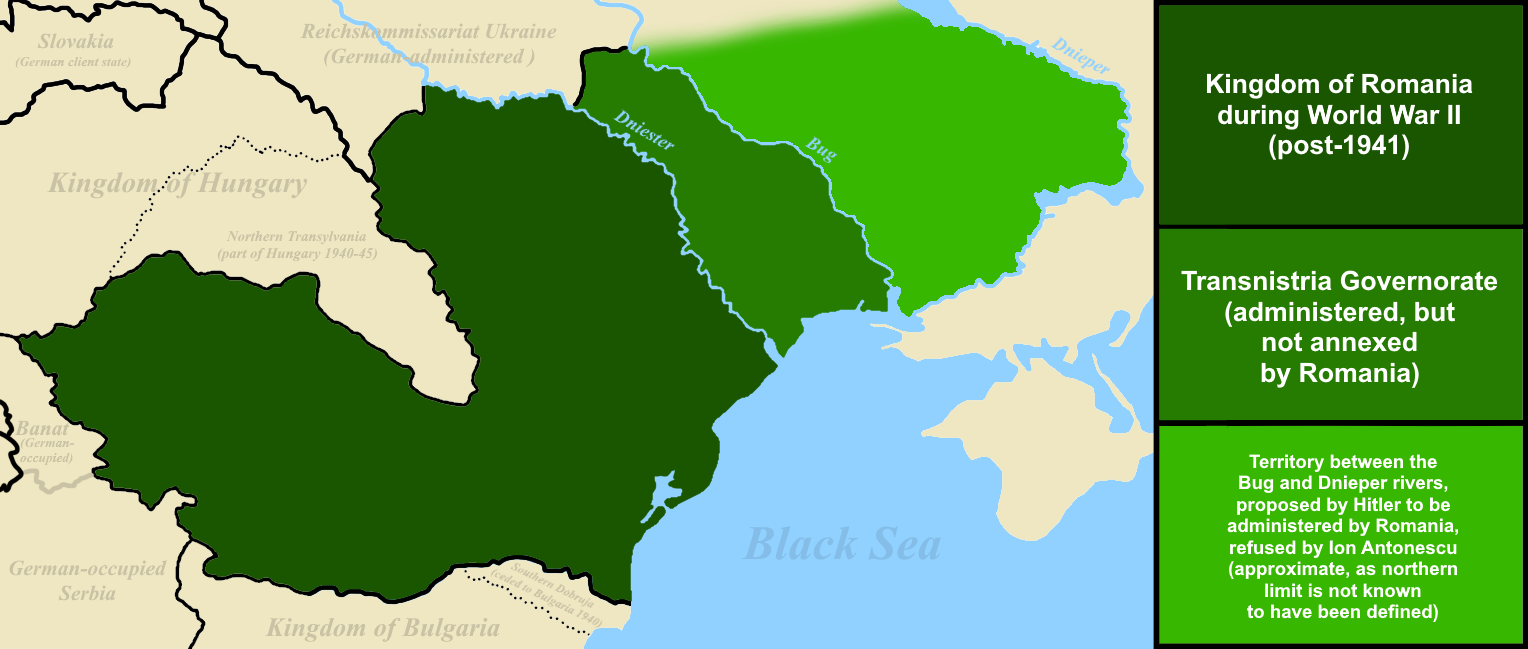
Hitler proposed that Romania administer the territory between the Dniester and Dnieper, but Antonescu refused

On 17 August 1941, when Ion Antonescu announced to Hitler that he would only administer the territory between the Dniester and Bug, Romania's Deputy Prime Minister Mihai Antonescu had a discussion with the former before the response was sent to the German Führer. He proposed Romania's wartime leader to reflect upon the possible advantages of taking over the administration of the entire territory Hitler had originally proposed, from the Dniester to the Dnieper. Mihai Antonescu believed that, by doing so, ethnic Romanians that were scattered throughout Ukraine beyond the Bug could have been moved to Romania. Additionally, he stated that, after an eventual Soviet defeat, Romania could have become a maritime power of the Black Sea, or at least establish a separate state in the region that was to be under Romania's protection and influence.

== Air section ==
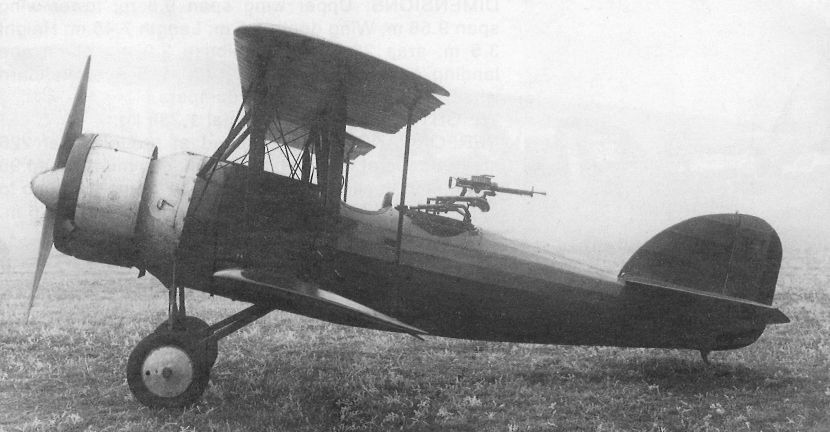
SET 7K

Transnistria had budgetary autonomy and as such made use of its own aircraft, separate from the rest of the Royal Romanian Air Force. The following aircraft comprised the Transnistrian air section:

Model	Origin	Number
Fw 58	Germany	1
SET 7K	Romania	3
RWD 13	Poland	5
Ju 52	Germany	2

== The Holocaust ==
Responsibility for the Holocaust in Odessa and Transnistria at large was squarely Romania's, the only country aside from Germany to administer a major Soviet city during World War II. Odessa – at the time, one of the greatest centers of Jewish life and culture in Europe – had been rendered virtually judenrein, despite its population being one third Jewish at the start of World War II.

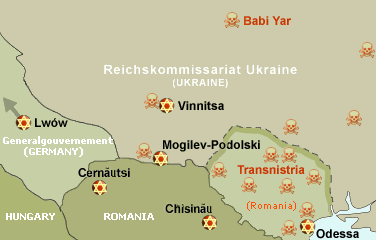
Map of the Holocaust in Ukraine and Romania. Massacres marked with red skulls.

Many Jews were deported to Transnistria from Bessarabia and Bukovina. During the period 1941–1944, 200,000 Romani people and Jews became victims of the Romanian occupation of Transnistria. Not being Romanian territory, Transnistria was used as a killing field for the extermination of Jews. Survivors say that in comparison with the Holocaust of Nazi Germany, where deportations were carefully planned, the Romanian government did not prepare to house thousands of people in Transnistria, where the deportees stayed. The people were instead placed in crude barracks without running water, electricity or latrines. Those who could not walk were simply left to die. In total, around 150 ghettos and camps functioned in Transnistria.

In Odessa, between 80,000 and 90,000 of the city's roughly 180,000 Jews remained at the time the Germans and Romanians captured the city on October 16, 1941. Six days later, a bomb exploded in the Romanian military headquarters in Odessa, prompting a massacre of Jews; many were burned alive. In October and November 1941 alone, Romanian troops in Odessa killed about 30,000 Jews. Transnistria was the site of two concentration camps and several de facto ghettos (which the Romanian wartime government referred to as "colonies"). In addition, most of the remaining Jews in Bessarabia (84,000 of 105,000) and northern Bukovina (36,000 of 60,000) were herded into these as well. A striking paradox is the fact that most of Romanian Jews (375,000) under Antonescu regime survived WW2. The Holocaust Encyclopedia (United States Holocaust Memorial Museum) writes that "Among the most notorious of these ghettos… was Bogdanovka, on the west bank of the Bug River… In December 1941, Romanian troops, together with Ukrainian auxiliaries, massacred almost all the Jews in Bogdanovka; shootings continued for more than a week." Similar events occurred at the Domanovka and Akmechetka camps, and (quoting the same source) "typhus-devastated Jews were crowded into the 'colony' in Mohyliv-Podilskyi." Other camps with very high death rates included Pechora and the Vapniarka concentration camp, which was established in 1941 and was used primarily to imprison Jews and political prisoners deported from Romania proper.

Many Jews died of exposure, starvation, or disease during the deportations to Transnistria or after arrival. Others were murdered by Romanian or German units, either in Transnistria or after being driven across the Bug River into the German-occupied Ukraine. Most of the Jews who were sent to the camps in Transnistria never returned. Those who survived, around 70,000, returned to Romania in 1945 to find that they had lost their houses.

Even for the general population, food in Transnistria was very scarce, through lack of Romanian planning. According to one survivor's account, people would gather outside a slaughterhouse and wait for scraps of meat, skin and bones to be thrown out of the slaughterhouse after the cleaning each morning. He remembers that they were fighting for the bones "just like dogs would" and that people were starving to death. Among the survivors were Liviu Librescu and Norman Manea.

=== Position of Antonescu government ===
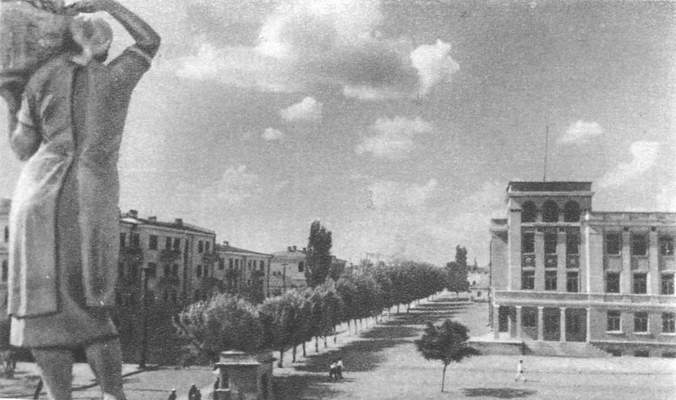
Tiraspol in 1941

Antonescu, in a government meeting showed intentions to deport all Jews behind the Ural Mountains if it would be possible: "I have about 10,000 Jews left in Bessarabia, who in a few days will be taken across the Dniester, and if circumstances will allow, they will be taken beyond the Urals".

=== Camps and ghettos in the Transnistria Governorate ===
Site	Romanian-era classification / function	Present-day location	Notes	English Wikipedia article
Akhmechetka / Acmecetca	Camp / extermination site	Prybuzhzhya, Mykolaiv Oblast, Ukraine	One of the principal killing camps in Golta County, where thousands of Jews were murdered.	Akhmechetka concentration camp
Ananiev	Ghetto	Ananiv, Odesa Oblast, Ukraine	A ghetto was established after Ananiev became part of Romanian-administered Transnistria in September 1941. About 300 remaining Jews were confined there and were subsequently murdered near Mostovoye while being marched toward Dubăsari.	—
Balanivka / Balanovca	Ghetto / transit site	Balanivka, Vinnytsia Oblast, Ukraine	Established in October 1941 as a ghetto and transit site for Jewish deportees from Bessarabia and Bukovina. About 3,500 Jews were initially confined in roofless cowsheds, and thousands died from cold, malnutrition, disease and poor sanitary conditions.	—
Balta	Ghetto	Balta, Odesa Oblast, Ukraine	A ghetto was established in October 1941 and held local Jews, Jews from elsewhere in Ukraine, and deportees from Bessarabia and Bukovina. About 4,000 Jews were initially confined there.	—
Bershad	Ghetto	Bershad, Vinnytsia Oblast, Ukraine	One of the major ghettos of Romanian-administered Transnistria; it held local Jews and large numbers of deportees from Bessarabia and Bukovina, many of whom suffered from overcrowding, hunger and disease.	—
Bobryk / Bobric	Camp / ghetto	Bobryk, Odesa Oblast, Ukraine	One of the sites used by Romanian authorities to concentrate Jewish deportees in Transnistria before intended expulsion across the Bug River into German-controlled territory.	—
Bogdanovka	Colony / concentration camp	Bohdanivka, Mykolaiv Oblast, Ukraine	Major site of mass murder in Golta County. Tens of thousands of Jews were murdered there between December 1941 and January 1942.	Bogdanovka concentration camp
Bratslav	Ghetto	Bratslav, Vinnytsia Oblast, Ukraine	Ghetto established in September 1941 for local Jews, Jews from the surrounding district and deportees from Bessarabia and Bukovina. Most inmates were transferred to the Pechora concentration camp around the beginning of January 1942.	—
Camenca	Ghetto	Camenca, present-day Moldova	Ghetto in Romanian-administered Transnistria that held local Jews and deportees; as elsewhere in Transnistria, Jews confined in ghettos were subjected to forced labour and severe shortages of food and other necessities.	—
Cicelnic / Chechelnik	Ghetto	Chechelnyk, Vinnytsia Oblast, Ukraine	A barbed-wire-enclosed ghetto held about 1,000 local Jews and survivors from neighbouring communities, followed by more than 1,000 deportees from Bukovina and Bessarabia. Inmates were subjected to forced labour, and about one-third died during a typhus epidemic in the winter of 1941–1942.	—
Domanovka / Domanevca	Camp	Domanivka, Mykolaiv Oblast, Ukraine	Major detention and killing site in Golta County, where Romanian authorities carried out mass murder of Jews.	Domanovka concentration camp
Dubăsari	Ghetto / mass killing site	Dubăsari, present-day Moldova	Romanian authorities established a ghetto consisting of two streets and confined about 2,500 Jews from Dubăsari district there. In September 1941, members of Einsatzkommando 12 began murdering the ghetto's inmates in mass shootings outside the town.	—
Dzhurin	Ghetto	Dzhuryn, Vinnytsia Oblast, Ukraine	Ghetto under Romanian occupation that held local Jews and deportees from Romania, including Jews from Bessarabia and Bukovina.	—
Dzyhivka	Ghetto	Dzygivka, Vinnytsia Oblast, Ukraine	Jews were concentrated in a ghetto shortly after the German occupation in July 1941. After the town became part of Romanian-administered Transnistria, about 100 deportees from Bukovina and Bessarabia were brought there, and inmates were subjected to forced labour.	—
Grosulovo	Internment camp	Velyka Mykhailivka, Odesa Oblast, Ukraine	A camp established in a dilapidated tobacco depot in autumn 1941 initially held local Ukrainian Jews and Jews deported from Bessarabia and Bukovina. In October 1943 hundreds of Jewish and non-Jewish political prisoners were transferred there from Vapniarka.	Grosulovo internment camp
Iampol	Ghetto / deportation transit point	Yampil, Vinnytsia Oblast, Ukraine	One of the crossing points through which Jews deported from Bessarabia and Bukovina entered Transnistria; deportees were subsequently distributed among camps and ghettos in the governorate.	—
Mohyliv-Podilskyi / Mogilev	Ghetto / transit centre	Mohyliv-Podilskyi, Vinnytsia Oblast, Ukraine	One of the principal entry points for Jews deported from Bessarabia and Bukovina and the site of one of the largest ghettos in Transnistria. About 25,000 Bessarabian Jews passed through a transit camp there in 1941.	—
Murafa	Ghetto	Murafa, Vinnytsia Oblast, Ukraine	Ghetto in Romanian-administered Transnistria that became a destination for Jewish deportees, including Jews from Bukovina.	Murafa, Vinnytsia Oblast
Mytky	Camp / ghetto	Vinnytsia Oblast, Ukraine	One of the northern Transnistrian sites designated by Romanian authorities for concentrating Jews before their intended expulsion across the Bug River.	—
Obodivka / Obodovka / Obodovca	Ghetto / transit camp	Obodivka, Vinnytsia Oblast, Ukraine	One of the principal concentration and transit sites used for Jews deported into Transnistria; deportees were confined under extremely poor conditions.	Obodivka internment camp
Olgopol	Ghetto	Olhopil, Vinnytsia Oblast, Ukraine	A ghetto was established for the remaining local Jews and several hundred deportees from Bessarabia and Bukovina. Inmates were subjected to forced labour, hunger and a typhus epidemic.	—
Pechora / Pecioara	Concentration camp	Pechera, Vinnytsia Oblast, Ukraine	One of two sites described by the United States Holocaust Memorial Museum as concentration camps established by Romanian authorities in Transnistria; prisoners died in large numbers from starvation, exposure and disease.	Pechora concentration camp
Golta	Ghetto / forced-labour and internment sites	Pervomaisk, Mykolaiv Oblast, Ukraine	Administrative centre of Golta County, a district containing several major Romanian detention and killing sites, including Bogdanovka, Domanovka and Akhmechetka.	—
Rohizka / Rogozna	Camp / ghetto	Vinnytsia Oblast, Ukraine	One of the northern Transnistrian sites designated by Romanian authorities for concentrating Jews before their intended expulsion across the Bug River.	—
Șargorod	Ghetto	Sharhorod, Vinnytsia Oblast, Ukraine	A major ghetto that held local Jews and thousands of deportees. About 5,000 Jews from Bessarabia and Bukovina were deported to Sharhorod in late 1941, joining approximately 2,000 local Jews.	—
Slobidka	Ghetto / transit camp	Odesa, Odesa Oblast, Ukraine	Romanian authorities confined thousands of Jews in the Slobidka ghetto. In January 1942 it became the principal assembly and transit point for the deportation of Odesa's remaining Jews to other parts of Transnistria.	—
Slivina	Forced-labour camp	Slyvyne, Mykolaiv Oblast, Ukraine	Forced-labour camp established in spring 1943 during German bridge and road construction operations near the Southern Bug. Jews from ghettos elsewhere in Transnistria were transferred there for forced labour.	—
Șpikov	Ghetto	Shpykiv, Vinnytsia Oblast, Ukraine	Ghetto in Romanian-administered Transnistria that held local Jews and deportees; Jews from Shpykiv were among those transferred to the Pechora concentration camp.	—
Tiraspol	Ghetto / transit and forced-labour centre	Tiraspol, present-day Moldova	An important transit point for Jews deported into Transnistria. A small ghetto developed around Jewish craftsmen retained in the city, and several forced-labour centres subsequently operated there.	—
Tomashpil	Ghetto	Tomashpil, Vinnytsia Oblast, Ukraine	Romanian authorities confined the town's Jews in a barbed-wire-enclosed ghetto in December 1941. Inmates lived in severe overcrowding and were used for forced labour, while hunger and infectious disease were widespread.	—
Tulcin	Ghetto	Tulchyn, Vinnytsia Oblast, Ukraine	A ghetto was established in October 1941. On 13 December about 3,000 Jews were deported from Tulcin to the Pechora concentration camp, while a smaller number of skilled workers were initially retained in the town.	—
Vapniarka	Concentration camp	Vapniarka, Vinnytsia Oblast, Ukraine	Concentration camp used primarily for Jewish political prisoners deported from Romania. Hundreds developed lathyrism after prisoners were fed toxic Lathyrus sativus peas.	Vapniarka concentration camp

== End of the governorate ==
The process of disintegration of Romanian rule in Transnistria started to unfold almost as soon as 1944 began. German operative troops entered northern Transnistria in January 1944. By the end of the month, the Romanians had lost control over the region's northern counties. Partisans, along with the Germans and their Cossack auxiliaries, frequently attacked Romanian officials of all ranks and commandeered their vehicles. Romanian gendarmes, severely outnumbered and in fear for their lives, remained in their quarters. The pretor of Trostineț raion was killed by German soldiers. On 29 January 1944, on account of Transnistria's transformation into a de facto military rear area, Ion Antonescu ended the civilian administration of the region and dismissed Governor Alexianu. At the same time or roughly two weeks later (15 February 1944), the very name "Transnistria" was dropped; the region – now under General Gheorghe Potopeanu (from 1 February 1944) – officially became a territory under military administration. On 15 March 1944, Potopeanu ordered the withdrawal of all remaining personnel from the region. The last Romanian-perpetrated massacre during the Holocaust in Transnistria also took place on 15 March 1944, when Romanian gendarmes killed 4 Jews in Slobidka. Shortly before being taken over by the Red Army, Transnistria's urban centers were transferred from Romanian to German control: Bershad roughly 1 week before its takeover, Balta and Zhmerynka both on 16 March and Tiraspol on 19 March. The Romanian mayor of Odessa was deposed by the Germans on 24 March, being replaced by a Russian engineer and German collaborator named Petrushkov. The Germans officially took over the region on 1 April 1944.

The Red Army entered Transnistria on 14 March 1944, taking the town of Bershad. Tulchyn followed on 15 March, Mohyliv-Podilskyi on 20 March, Balta on 29 March and Rîbnița on 30 March. Yampil was taken over on 17 March 1944. Zhmerynka was taken over by the Red Army on 21 March. Pervomaisk (of which Golta was a part) was taken on 22 March, followed by Ochakiv on 31 March. The Soviets reached Berezivka on 31 March. On 1 April, Governor Potopeanu was deposed by the Germans and what remained of Transnistria (the 5 administrative centers not yet taken over by the Red Army as of 1 April: Ananiv, Odessa, Ovidiopol, Tiraspol and Dubăsari) came under official German control.

On March 28, the Red Army took Nikolaev and the next day crossed the lower Bug river in force. On April 5, Razdelnaia fell, and therewith the Odessa-Tiraspol highway was cut. On the 19th, after a brief but bitter fight, the Red Army re-entered Odessa. On the April 12, Tiraspol was occupied, and four days later all Transnistria was again in Soviet hands. During the final days, the Germans concentrated on destruction in Odessa, since evacuation was impossible. Port installations, some industrial facilities, and transportation junctions were blown up (even the electric power plant, various mills, stores of bread, sugar, and other foods were destroyed). Of Odessa's population, scarcely 200,000 remained; many had hidden in the vicinity while some had sought safety in the countryside. And some had left westward with the Romanians and Germans: only those most compromised had left; the bulk of the residents had stayed in the region. People feared Soviet repressions, but "there was no other way out", according to German sources. It is worth noting however, that there was still a very small piece of Transnistrian territory still left under Romanian rule as late as August 1944, according to an OKH map depicting the situation on the Romanian front as of 20 August. This area comprised a Westwards salient created by the Dniester river, centered around Coșnița (today part of the Dubăsari District of the Republic of Moldova).

=== Reduction of the Transnistria Romanian population ===
Today east of the Dniester there are only 237,785 Romanian-speaking residents left, a small percentage of the overall population of the region, most of whom live in the actual Transnistria break-away republic. But historically they were the majority: according to the results of the Russian census (quoted in Romanian sources) of 1793, 49 villages out of 67 between the Dniester and the Southern Bug were Romanian.

And further east of the Transnistria Governorate there were many neo-Latin communities: indeed the Romanians/Moldavians in Ukraine – east of the Bug river – were calculated by a German census to be nearly 780,000 (probably an excessive number), and plans were made to move them to Transnistria in 1942-43. But nothing was done.

A far more likely figure was that given by a Romanian daily in March 1943. It reported that, as of the summer of 1942, 23,000 Moldavian families had been located in Soviet territory east of the Bug (under German occupation). A group of these had been made to make records of their folk music "in order to preserve proof of the permanence of the Romanian element in the distant East" (Universul, March 15, 1943).

Indeed, when the Soviet Union regained the area in spring 1944, and the Soviet Army advanced into the territory driving out the Axis forces, many thousands of Romanians/Vlachs of Transnistria were killed in those months and deported to gulags in the following years. So, a political campaign was directed towards the rich Moldavian peasant families, which were deported to Kazakhstan and Siberia as well. For instance, in just two days, July 6 and July 7, 1949, over 11,342 Moldavian families (more than 40,000 inhabitants of Ukraine Oblasts) were deported by the order of the Minister of State Security, I. L. Mordovets, under a plan named "Operation South".

The Census statistics for Romanian-speaking population in territories east of the Dniester river are the following:

- 1939: 230.698 (according to the 1939 Soviet census), of which 170.982 in the Moldavian ASSR and 26.730 in Odessa Oblast.
- 1941: 197,685 inside Transnistria Governorate
- 2001: 307,785 (177,785 living in actual Transnistria zone + 60,000 living in Odesa Oblast + 70,000 living in the rest of Ukraine)

== See also ==
- Administrative divisions of the Kingdom of Romania (1941–1944)
- Bessarabia Governorate (Romania)
- Bukovina Governorate
- Demographic history of Transnistria
- Dnieper–Carpathian Offensive
- History of Romania
- History of Transnistria
- The Holocaust in Romania
- History of the Jews in Transnistria
- Pechora concentration camp
- Vapniarka concentration camp
- Bogdanovka concentration camp
- Rîbnița massacre
- Soviet occupation of Bessarabia and Northern Bukovina
- Romania in World War II
- Siege of Odessa (1941)
- Naval operations in Romanian-occupied Soviet waters
- Tatarka common graves

== Sources ==
- Axworthy, Mark; Scafeș, Cornel; Crăciunoiu, Cristian (1995). Third Axis Fourth Ally: Romanian Armed Forces in the European War, 1941-1945. London: Arms and Armour. ISBN 9781854092670.
- Marin, Voicu (2021). "Transnistria la instalarea administrașiei românești (1941)" [Transnistria at the Time of Establishing the Romanian Administration (1941)] (PDF). Revista "Document". Buletinul Arhivelor Militare Române ["Document" Magazine. Journal of the Romanian Military Archives] (in Romanian). 2 (92): 43–53. ISSN 1454-0924.
- Nicholls, David (2000). Adolf Hitler. A Biographical Companion. Oxford: ABC-CLIO. ISBN 1851093478.
- Pavlichenko, Lyudmila (2015). Lady Death. The Memoirs of Stalin's Sniper. Barnsley: Greenhill Books. ISBN 978-1-78438-270-4.
- Popp, Nicolae M. (1943). "Transnistria. Încercare de monografie regională" [Transnistria. Regional Monography Attempt] (PDF). Revista "Moldova Nouă" [New Moldavia Magazine] (in Romanian). 2. Bucharest.
- Stavrianos, L. S. (1958). The Balkans since 1453. New York: Rinehart & Company, Inc.
- White, George W. (2000). Nationalism and Territory. Constructing Group Identity in Southeastern Europe. Oxford: Rowman & Littlefield Publishers, Inc. ISBN 0-8476-9809-2.
