= Dzhuryn, Vinnytsia Oblast =

Village in Vinnytsia Oblast, Ukraine

Dzhuryn Джурин
- Village
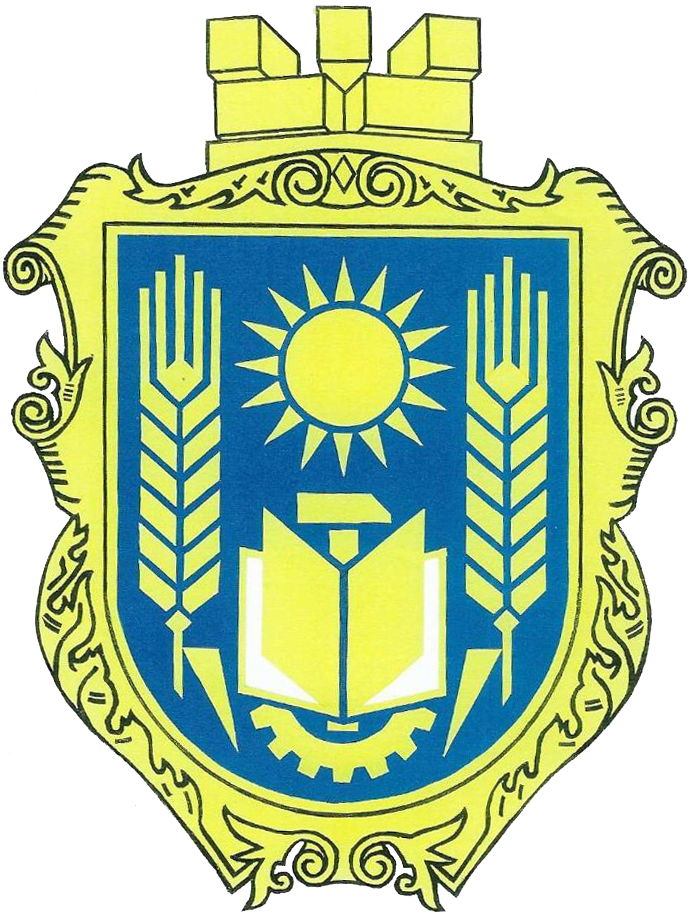
- Coat of arms

- Location in Vinnytsia Oblast Location in Ukraine
- Country: Ukraine
- Oblast: Vinnytsia Oblast
- Raion: Zhmerynka Raion
- Founded: 1547

Area
  - Total: 6.202 km^{2} (2.395 sq mi)

Population (2001)
  - Total: 3,734
  - Density: 602.1/km^{2} (1,559/sq mi)
- Time zone: UTC+2 (EET)
  - Summer (DST): UTC+3 (EEST)
- Postal code: 23545
- Area code: +380 434423

Dzhuryn or Juryn (Ukrainian: Джурин; דזשורין, Dzhurin) is a village in Zhmerynka Raion, Vinnytsia Oblast, Ukraine. Dzhuryn hosts the administration of Dzhuryn settlement hromada, one of the hromadas of Ukraine.

== History ==
Located in the eastern part of the historical region of Podolia, Dzhuryn is a traditional centre of pottery. During the Soviet period, it served as a district centre.

=== Jewish history ===
Jews had established a substantial community in Dzhuryn by the 19th century. By the end of that century, approximately 1,600 Jews lived in the town, constituting about one-third of its population. During the Russian Civil War, dozens of Jews were murdered in Dzhuryn by Ukrainian forces and members of the White Army, and many Jews subsequently left the town.

During the 1920s, a state-sponsored Jewish council operating in Yiddish was established in Dzhuryn, as was a Yiddish-language school. Many local Jews worked at the town's sugar factory or in a Jewish agricultural cooperative. The Jewish population declined during the interwar period, and by the late 1930s approximately 1,000 Jews remained in Dzhuryn.

==== The Holocaust ====
German and Romanian forces occupied Dzhuryn on 22 July 1941. On 1 September, the town was incorporated into the Romanian-administered Transnistria Governorate. Romanian authorities established an unfenced ghetto in the town. Non-Jewish residents continued to live within its boundaries; Jewish houses were marked with a Star of David, while non-Jewish houses were marked with a cross. Jews were required to wear armbands bearing a Star of David and were permitted to leave the ghetto only for limited periods to obtain food and water.

Between late October 1941 and January 1942, approximately 3,500 Jews deported from Bukovina and Bessarabia were brought to Dzhuryn from the transit camp at Mohyliv-Podilskyi. Local Jewish families housed many of the deportees, while others were accommodated in the Great Synagogue, barns and warehouses. The arrival of the deportees greatly increased overcrowding and pressure on the community's limited food and housing resources. Romanian authorities similarly confined Jews elsewhere in Transnistria in approximately 150 improvised ghettos and camps, where overcrowding, hunger, disease and forced labour caused widespread mortality.

Men and women in the Dzhuryn ghetto were subjected to forced labour, and some were sent to labour camps. Approximately 20 of those sent away for forced labour died. Some local Ukrainian peasants assisted Jews or employed them clandestinely, although contacts between the ghetto and surrounding population became increasingly difficult following violence by Romanian gendarmes.

In October 1942, a seven-member Jewish committee was established under Max Rosenrauch, a deportee, although much of its practical administration was undertaken by his deputy, Moshe Katz. The committee organized a 20-member auxiliary police force and established social and medical institutions. During the winter of 1942–43, a 56-bed hospital was opened. A soup kitchen established on the initiative of Rabbi Baruch Hager of the Vizhnitz Hasidic dynasty, himself a deportee, provided food for approximately 800 to 1,000 people in 1943. An orphanage caring for approximately 250 children was established in the autumn of that year. The ghetto also had a Jewish court and, from 1943, a pharmacy supplied with medicines received from the Jewish relief committee in Bucharest.

Despite these efforts, overcrowding and inadequate food contributed to an outbreak of typhus. Approximately 400 Jews died during the epidemic. Reports by the Jewish relief committee in Bucharest recorded 4,050 Jews in Dzhuryn between January and March 1943, of whom 997 were local Jews and 3,053 were deportees.

Jewish communal and cultural activity continued under confinement. Branches of the Zionist youth movements Hanoar Hatzioni and Betar operated in the ghetto, as did a small Gordonia training group. The Jewish committee also obtained identity documents for Jews who had escaped from other locations and reached Dzhuryn.

Approximately 500 Jews died or were murdered in the Dzhuryn ghetto during the Romanian occupation. Dzhuryn was liberated by the Red Army on 19 March 1944.

=== Recent history ===
Until 18 July 2020, Dzhuryn belonged to Sharhorod Raion. The raion was abolished in July 2020 as part of the administrative reform of Ukraine, which reduced the number of raions of Vinnytsia Oblast to six. The area of Sharhorod Raion was merged into Zhmerynka Raion.

== Gallery ==
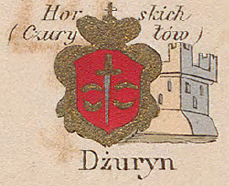
Dzhuryn on an 1863 map by Zygmunt Gerstmann

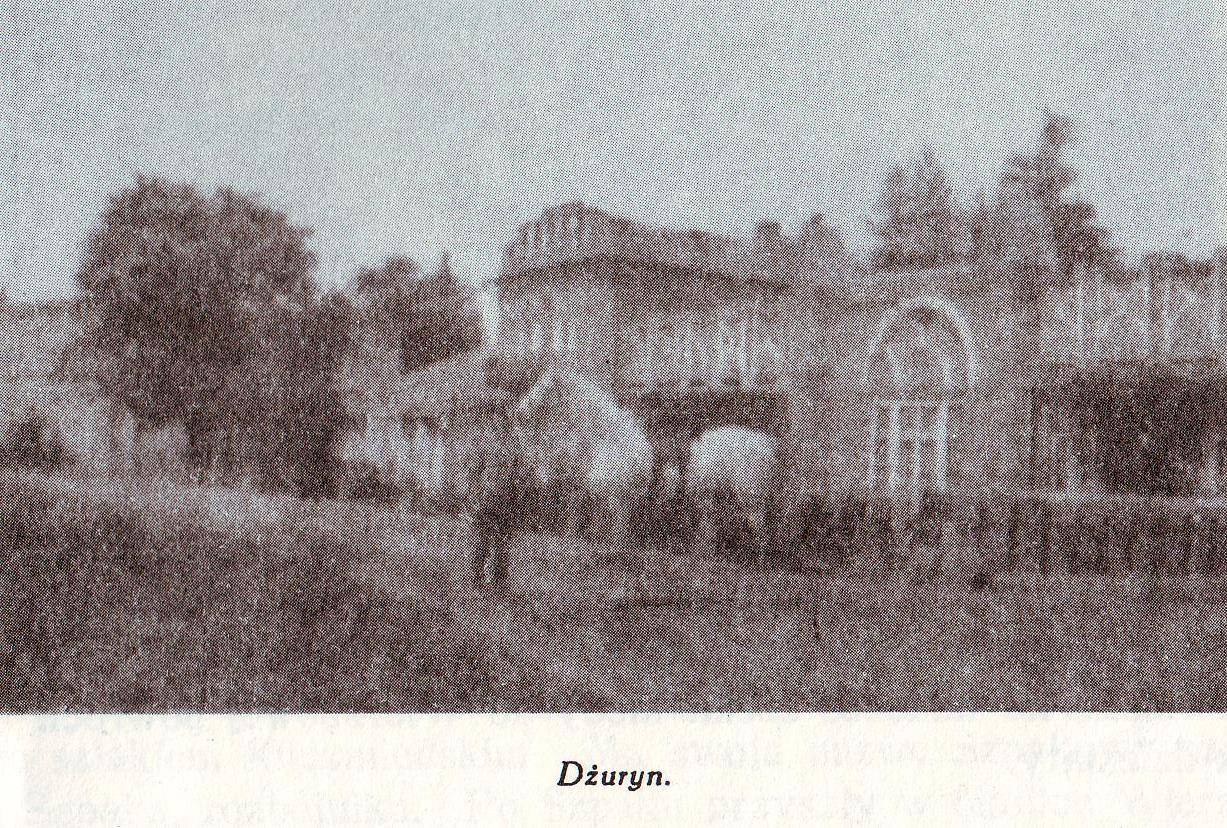
Dzhuryn in 1928
