= 1941 Romanian census =

1941 census held in Romania

← 1930	1941	1942 →

General information
- Country: Romania
- Authority: National Institute of Statistics

The 1941 Romanian census (Romanian: Recensământul General al României din 1941) was conducted on 6 April 1941 in all territories still remaining in the Kingdom of Romania, following the loss of land to Hungary (Northern Transylvania), Bulgaria (Southern Dobruja), and the Soviet Union (Bessarabia, Hertsa, and Northern Bukovina). After the Axis invasion of the Soviet Union, Romania retook control of its lands that the Soviet Union had invaded, in which it conducted the census separately in the autumn of 1941. Later, Romania also annexed the Transnistria Governorate, finishing the census by conducting it there in December 1941.

The census-taking process was overseen by Friedrich Burgdörfer, the chairman of the Bavarian Statistical Office of Nazi Germany. After a six-day trip across multi-ethnic Romanian regions, he reported to Sabin Manuilă and Ion Antonescu (then the leader of Romania), praising the methods of the census and predicting that it would offer an accurate count. Hungarian statistician Varga E. Árpád has stated that the data, specifically with reference to ethnic Hungarians in Southern Transylvania, is quite correct. Despite this, several other Hungarian ethnographers and demographers continue to dispute the numbers found by the census. The provisional results of the census were first publicly released in 1944 by the National Institute of Statistics.

Notably, it was the first Romanian census to include ethnic origin as a separate category. The census, on Manuilă's direction, also included a special section cataloguing all Jewish-owned property, a summary of which was sent to the German Main Security Office.

== Results ==
Ethnic map by county (1941 census)

The ethnic structure of Romania, in its April 1941 borders, was as follows:

Ethnicity	Percentage	Number
Romanians	87.38%	11,827,110
Germans	4.01%	542,325
Hungarians	3.01%	407,188
Jews	2.23%	302,090
Others	3.38%	457,044
Total	100%	13,535,757

The ethnic structure of Romania, in its December 1941 borders, was as follows:

Ethnicity	Percentage	Number
Romanians	73.31%	13,987,494
Germans	3.53%	674,307
Hungarians	2.13%	407,188
Jews	2.01%	384,397
Others	19.01%	3,626,821
Total	100%	19,080,207

The ethnic structure of the Transnistria Governorate, which was the last territory Romania annexed in which this census was undertaken in December 1941, was as follows:

Ethnicity	Number	%	% of Rural	% of Urban
Ukrainians/Ruthenians	1,775,273	76.3	79.9	57.4
Romanians	197,685	8.4	9.3	4.4
Russians	150,842	6.5	2.4	27.9
Germans (including Black Sea Germans)	126,464	5.4	5.9	2.7
Bulgarians	27,638	1.2	1.1	1.4
Jews	21,852	0.9	0.7	2.0
Poles	13,969	0.6	0.3	2.3
Lipovans	968	-	-	0.1
Tatars	900	-	-	0.1
Others	10,628	0.5	10.2	1.7
Total	2,326,224	100	1,956,557	369,669

== See also ==
- Demographic history of Romania
