= Bogdanovka concentration camp =

Romanian concentration camp for Jews in Transnistria Governorate

- Concentration camp
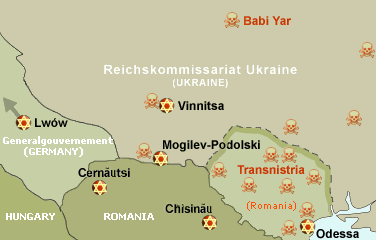
- Map of the Holocaust in Ukraine. Odessa ghetto marked with gold-red star. Transnistria massacres marked with red skulls.

- Location within Ukraine
- Coordinates: 47°48′48″N 31°9′23″E
- Operated by: Romania and Nazi Germany
- Operational: Autumn 1941-winter 1942
- Inmates: Ukrainian Jews
- Killed: More than 40,000

The Bogdanovka concentration camp was a concentration camp for Jews that was established in Transnistria Governorate by the Romanian authorities during World War II as part of the Holocaust.

== Location ==
Three concentration camps were situated near the villages of Bogdanovka, Domanovka and Akmechetka on the Southern Bug river, in Golta district, Transnistria with Bogdanovka holding 54,000 people by the end of 1941. This is now in the Ukrainian Mykolaiv Oblast.

== Massacres ==
In December 1941, a few cases of typhus, which is a disease spread by lice and fleas, broke out in the Bogdanovka concentration camp. A decision was made by the German adviser to the Romanian administration of the district, and the Romanian District Commissioner to murder all the inmates. The Aktion began on 21 December, and was carried out by Romanian soldiers, gendarmes, Ukrainian police, civilians from Golta, and local ethnic Germans under the commander of the Ukrainian regular police, Kazachievici. Thousands of disabled and ill inmates were forced into two locked stables, which were doused with kerosene and set ablaze, burning alive all those inside. Other inmates were led in groups to a ravine in a nearby forest and shot in their necks. The remaining Jews dug pits with their bare hands in the bitter cold, and packed them with frozen corpses. Thousands of Jews froze to death. A break was made for Christmas, but the killing resumed on 28 December. By 31 December, over 40,000 Jews had been killed. Overall, at least 40,000-48,000, and perhaps as many as 54,000, Jews were killed in the Bogdanovka concentration camp. A large majority of the Jews who were killed were originally from Transnistria, but 7,000 or more were from Bessarabia. Perhaps only 50 Jews who burned the bodies of the massacred Jews survived. For more information on the Holocaust in Transnistria, including on the fate of the Jewish deportees from Romania, including Bessarabia, see History of the Jews in Transnistria.

== See also ==
- History of the Jews in Bessarabia
- History of the Jews in Transnistria
- History of the Jews in Odesa
- Vapniarka concentration camp
- Domanivka
