= Pechora concentration camp =

Concentration camp operated by Romania during World War II

Coordinates: 48°51′41″N 28°42′39″E

Pechera (also Pechora or Pecioara; Ukrainian: Печера, Russian: Печера or Печора) was a concentration camp operated by Romania during World War II in the selo (village) of Pechera, now in Ukraine. The concentration camp was established on the gated grounds of what had once been a private estate of the Polish noble Potocki family on the banks of the Southern Bug river, which had been converted into a sanatorium for tuberculosis patients after the Russian revolution.

== During World War II ==
Located in the Romanian zone of occupation of Ukraine, known as Transnistria Governorate, the camp was overseen by a Romanian gendarme and guarded by Ukrainian policemen with batons and rifles. Beginning in November 1941, Jews from the surrounding regions, including Tulchyn, Bratslav, Shpikov, Tostyanets, as well as, later, from more distant regions such as Mohyliv-Podilskyi were brought to Pechora to perish in the enclosed grounds. Also sent to Pechora were Romanian Jews from Bessarabia and Bukovina. At the camp, prisoners were murdered not through systematic extermination by gas or bullets, but rather through starvation, exposure to the elements, and disease such as typhus. Also, many hundreds of prisoners were violently deported further east across the Bug river to work at DG-IV slave labor camps in German-occupied Ukraine, where almost none would survive.

According to Romanian wartime documentation, a sign that said "death camp" was installed at the camp's main gate. As with all of Transnistria's 150-plus concentration sites, the Romanian occupiers had no intention of sustaining the Jewish population under their control. In the case of Pechora, the inspector of the gendarmerie of Transnistria explicitly stated in October 1942 that Pechora was created "exclusively" for the purpose of killing its prisoners.

Historians and researchers including Matatias Carp and Radu Ioanid consider Pechora to be the most infamous of all the sites established in Romanian-occupied Ukraine. According to a report issued in 2004 bv the Wiesel Commission, it was among the sites of "the most hideous crimes committed against Jews during the Holocaust." No photos of the camp in operation are currently available, though survivor testimonies are plentiful.

The chief of the camp was a Romanian gendarme commander named Stratulat. According to survivor testimony, Stratulat prevented a group of SS-affiliated ethnic Germans (belonging to the Sonderkommando Russland) from liquidating the camp's population sometime in the late summer of 1942.

For many families interned in the Pechora camp, survival was only possible by trading the last of their clothes and possessions for food with villagers who would gather at the camp gate. Many child survivors would later report slipping out of the loosely-guarded camp and begging for food in the village of Pechora and in the surrounding communities. Many Pechora camp survivors owed their lives to the generosity of local ethnic Ukrainians, who often fed and housed them. Generally speaking, locals in the Romanian-occupied zone of Transnistria treated Jews much more favorably than did residents of other neighboring regions such as western Ukraine and Bessarabia, where pogroms were widespread. This phenomenon within Transnistria was described in an influential study by scholars Diana Dumitru and Carter Johnson.

Although estimates vary, older research suggested that as many as 11,000 prisoners were brought to the Pechora camp, of which approximately 9,500 perished. However, according to the newer research in the Encyclopedia of Camps and Ghettos, 1933-1945 from 2018, 4,000 Jews died in Pechora in 1941-1944, whereas about 200 died from February 1944 and March 1944, when the Soviets returned to the area; this excludes about 1,250 Jews who were handed over to the Germans, who exterminated them elsewhere. The Yad Vashem database lists the names of 4,554 Jews who died in the camp. Out of these, 2,651 were Ukrainian Jews according to the Yad Vashem database. Among these, 794 had lived in Mogilev-Podolski/Mohyliv-Podilskyi before World War II, whereas 1,198 had lived in Tulchyn. By contrast, 523 of the dead Jews listed in the Yad Vashem database had lived in Romania before the war; among these, 271 had lived in Bukovina and 128 had lived in Bessarabia. Moreover, 82 had lived in Dorohoi and the neighboring localities, including 10 from Darabani and the neighboring villages, 11 from Mihaileni and the neighboring villages, 35 from Saveni and neighboring villages and 9 from Hertsa and neighboring villages; all of these people had lived in Dorohoi County in Romania, which administratively became a part of Bukovina in 1941. If one excludes those Jews who escaped from the Pechora concentration camp, only 28 of the 3,000 Jews sent there from Mohyliv-Podilskyi to the Pechora concentration camp between October 12 and November 8, 1942 were still alive. The dead were carted off to mass graves including trenches on the periphery of the village and to the nearby Jewish cemetery. Between October 1942 and May 1943, 1,250 Jews from the Pechora concentration camp, where the living conditions were horrible, were handed over to the German Nazis, who killed them in the area of German control east and north of Transnistria.

The dead were carted off to mass graves including trenches on the periphery of the village and to the nearby Jewish cemetery. By the time the camp was liberated by the Red Army on March 17, 1944, no more than 300-400 surviving prisoners were left alive in the camp. Several hundred other survivors had managed to escape and reach nearby ghettos, particularly in 1943, where conditions were generally safer and where survivors would spend the remaining months of the war. However, they now represented the lowest stratum of ghetto society in places like the Dzhuryn ghetto, a common destination for Pechora camp escapees. According to a memo of the former president of the Jewish Committee of Moghilev- Podolski/Mohyliv-Podilskyi, M. Katz, about 20% of those sent to the Pechora concentration camp escaped from there. Moreover, on March 15, 1943, 220 Jews from the Pechoara camp were sent to a farm at Rahni. For more information on the Holocaust in Transnistria, including on the fate of the Jewish deportees from Romania, see History of the Jews in Transnistria.

== After World War II ==
After surviving the war, local Soviet-born Jewish survivors of the camp returned to their hometowns in southwestern Ukraine and largely remained there for decades, constituting the few places in Eastern Europe where Jewish life continued into the 21st century (though many families would eventually emigrate to Israel or the West).

Immediately following the war, a Soviet ethnomusicologist named Moisei Beregovski visited towns in what had been northern Transnistria to speak to survivors, aware of the fact that the survival rates were much higher in Transnistria than in German-occupied Ukraine. His team recorded songs performed by Pechora survivors from Tulchin, Bratslav, Bershad, and more. His team also wrote down the lyrics. Years later, the lyrics were set to new musical arrangements by a Toronto-based musical group. Their album (Yiddish Glory: The Lost Songs of World War II) was nominated for a Grammy award in 2019.

In the 1950s, many of the convicted ethnic Ukrainian collaborators—against whom some survivors had testified—were released early from Soviet labor camps and returned to the communities in which they had served during the war. The return of these collaborators was reinforced by official Soviet memory policies that actively suppressed the specific details of the Holocaust. Soviet monuments and history books strictly avoided mentioning that victims at sites like Pechora were specifically targeted because they were Jewish. Instead, all victims were homogenized under the catch-all phrase "peaceful Soviet citizens".

Given the continuity of Jewish life in the towns of what had been northern Transnistria—today, Ukraine's Vinnytsia Oblast—and the existence of postwar Yiddish-speaking communities, researchers have taken a keen interested in the remnants of Jewish life within the region. This includes scholar Jeffrey Veidlinger and groups from St. Petersburg, who visited survivors in towns like Tulchyn to interview survivors in the 1990s and early 2000s. Preeminent Yiddish-language writer Boris Sandler has also centered the Pechora camp and the Holocaust in Romania in his works, including the novella collection Red Shoes for Rachel. The Pechora camp was also the subject of a documentary by Israeli film maker Boris Maftsir, "We Allow You to Die." In 2022, the grandson of Pechora survivor Motl Braverman published a family memoir about his grandfather's survival in the camp: So They Remember: A Jewish Family's Story of Surviving the Holocaust in Soviet Ukraine.

Today, the grounds of the former estate are known as "Pechera Park" and are open to visitors, while the main administrative building on the grounds operates as a hospital. There are relatively few reminders of its sinister role during the war. A few memorial plaques have been erected on the grounds, while a more extensive monument and additional memorial stones stand at the site of the mass grave at the nearby Jewish cemetery.

== Gallery ==
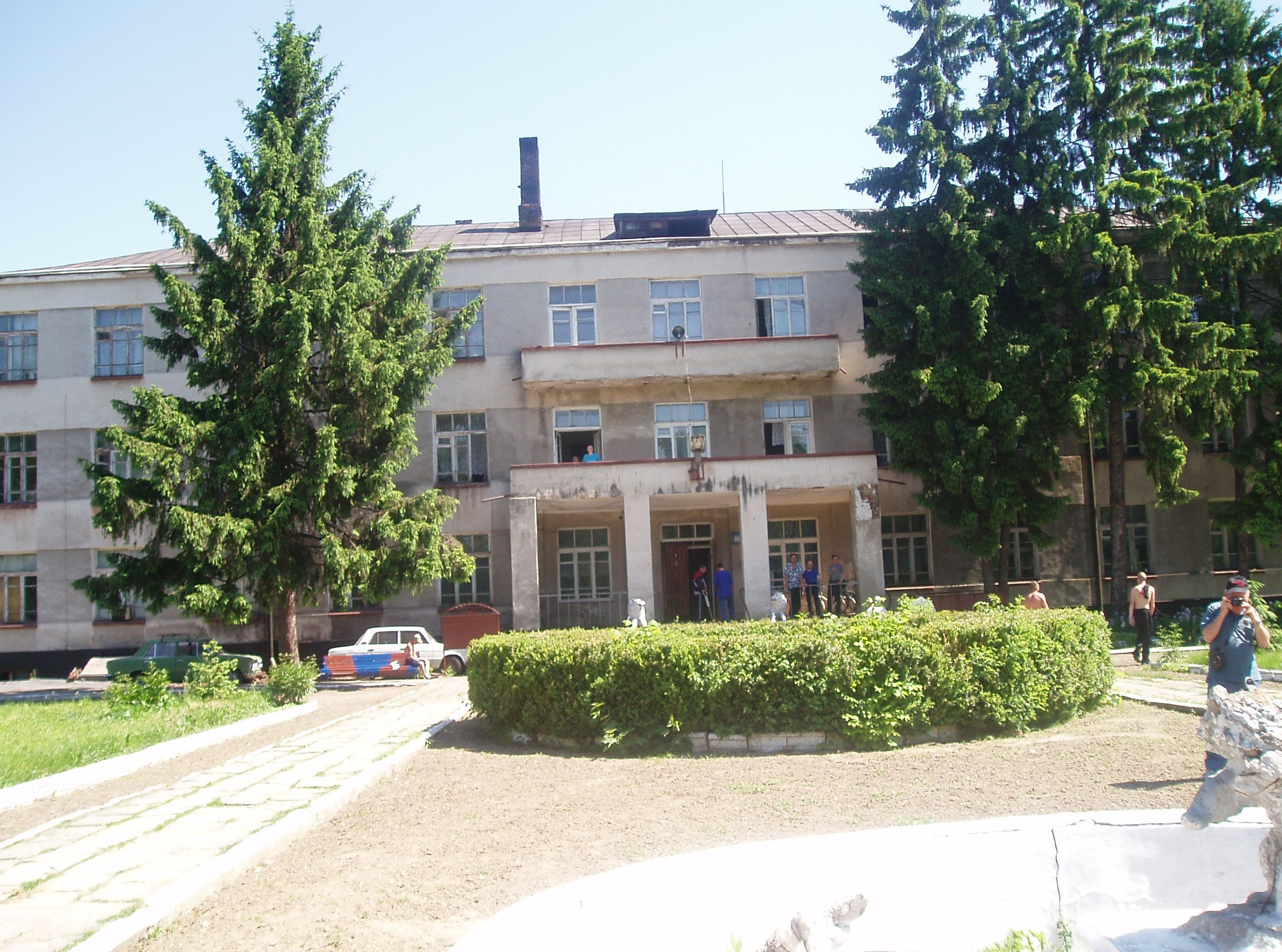
Main administrative building at the property

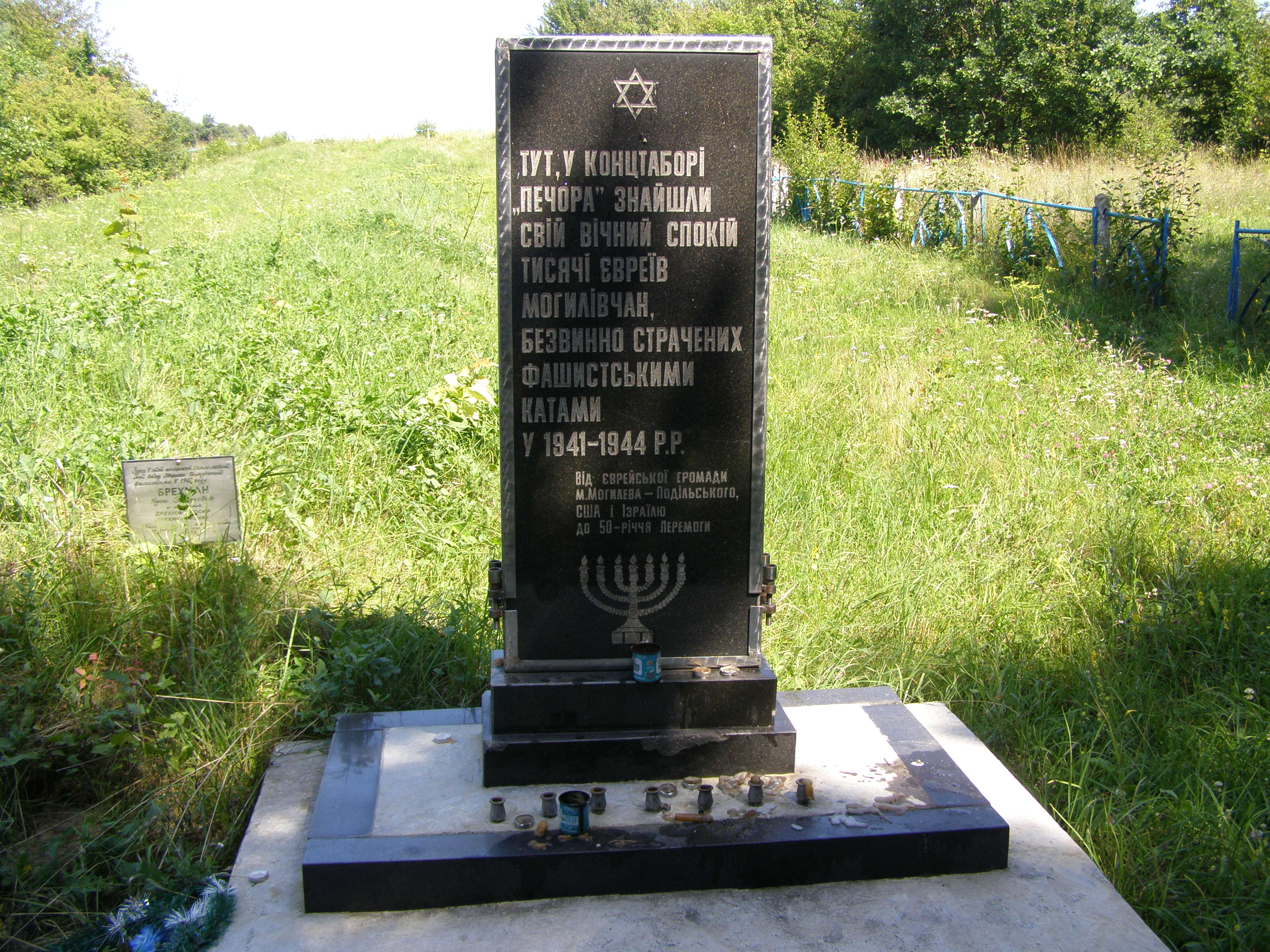
Monument at the mass graves, Jewish cemetery

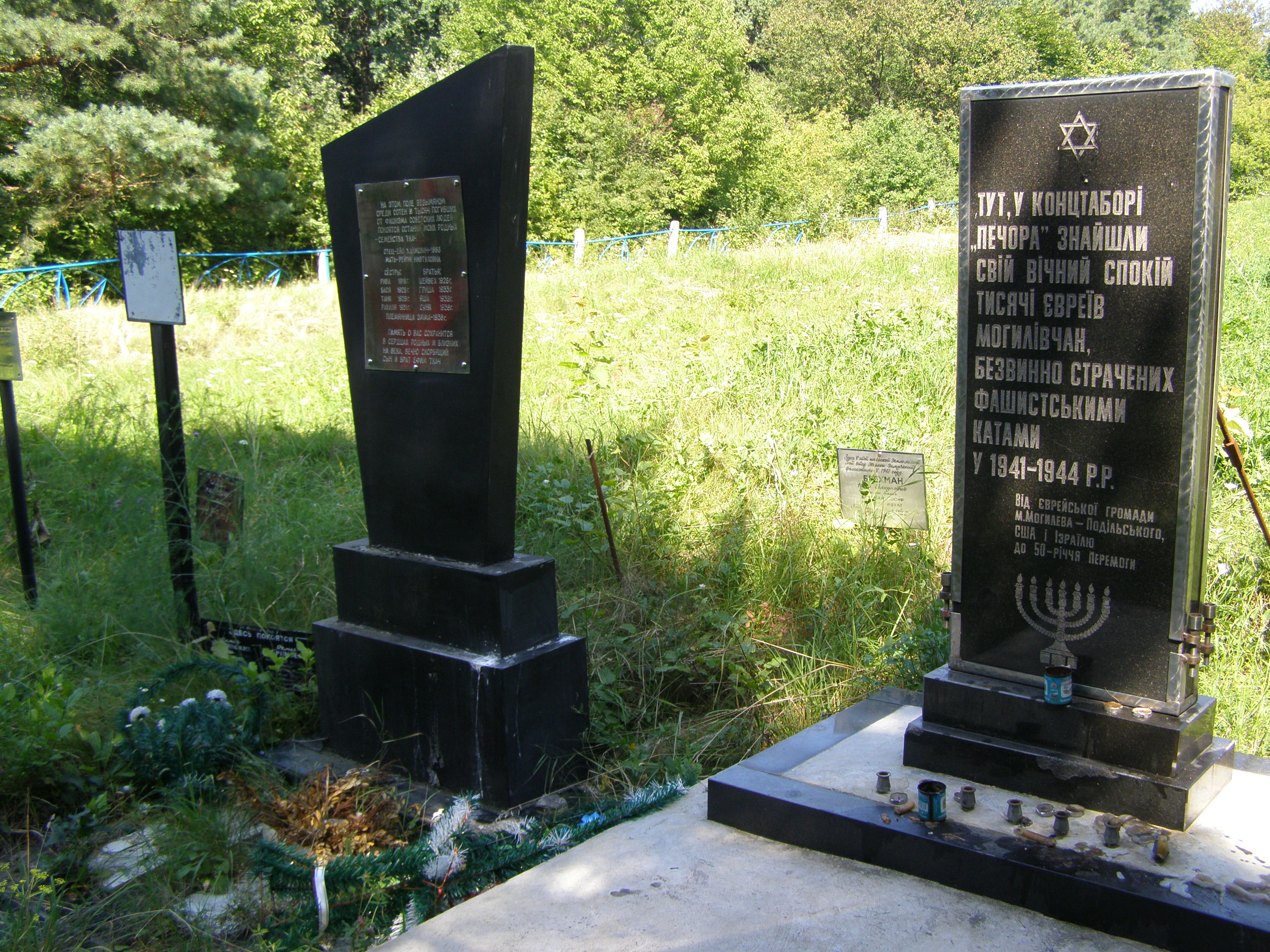
Monument at the mass graves, Jewish cemetery

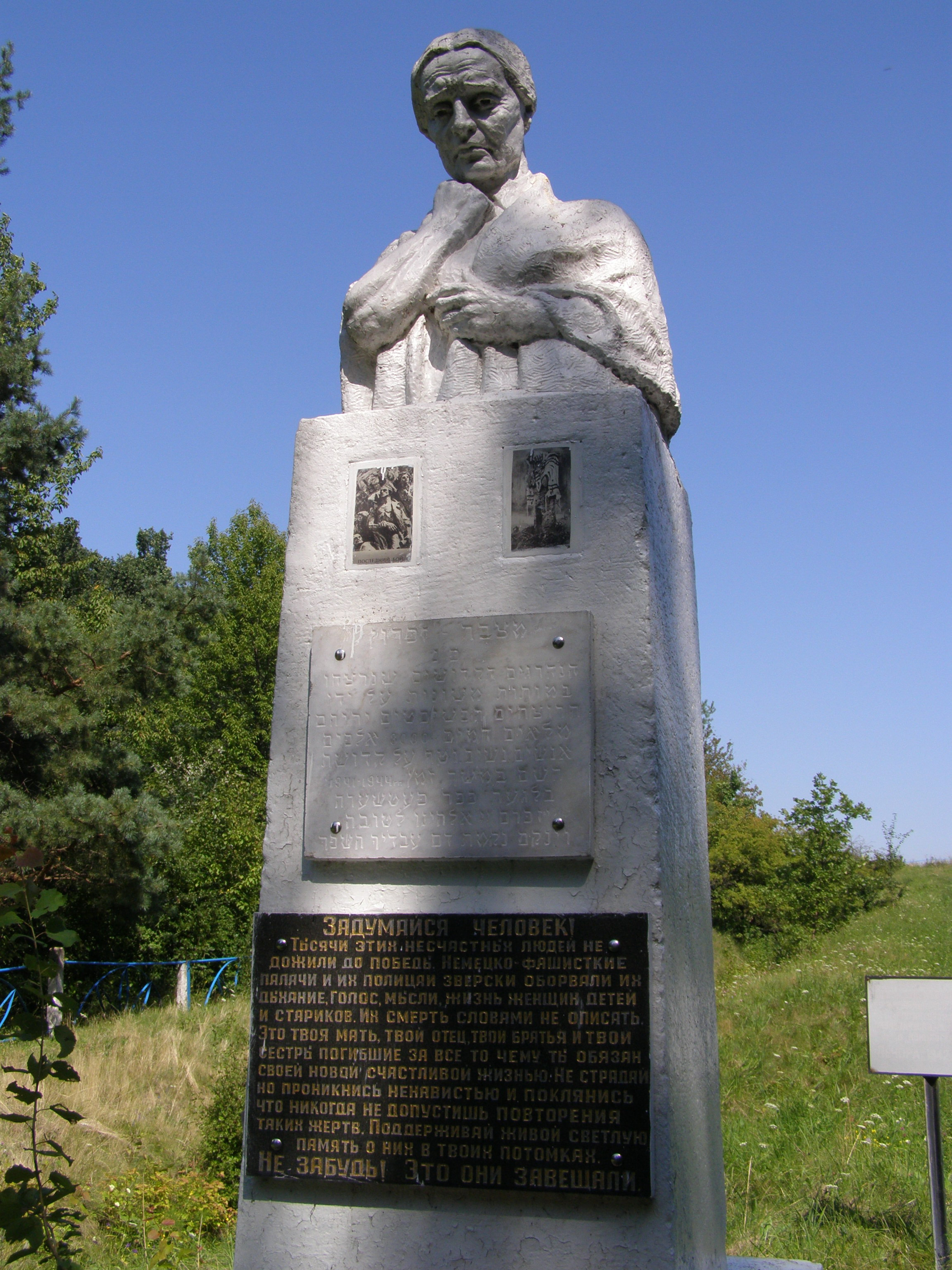
Monument at the mass graves, Jewish cemetery

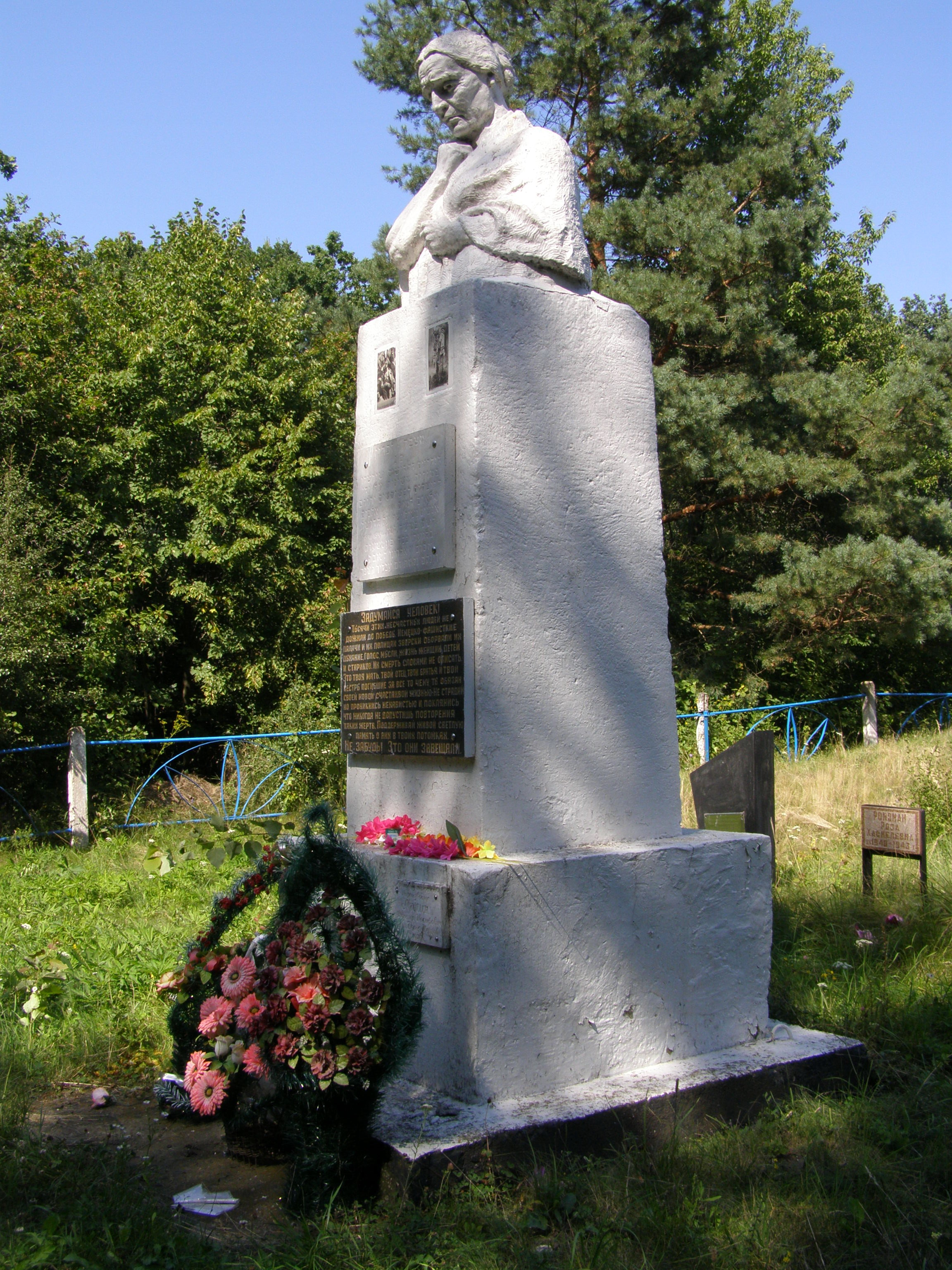
Monument at the mass graves, Jewish cemetery

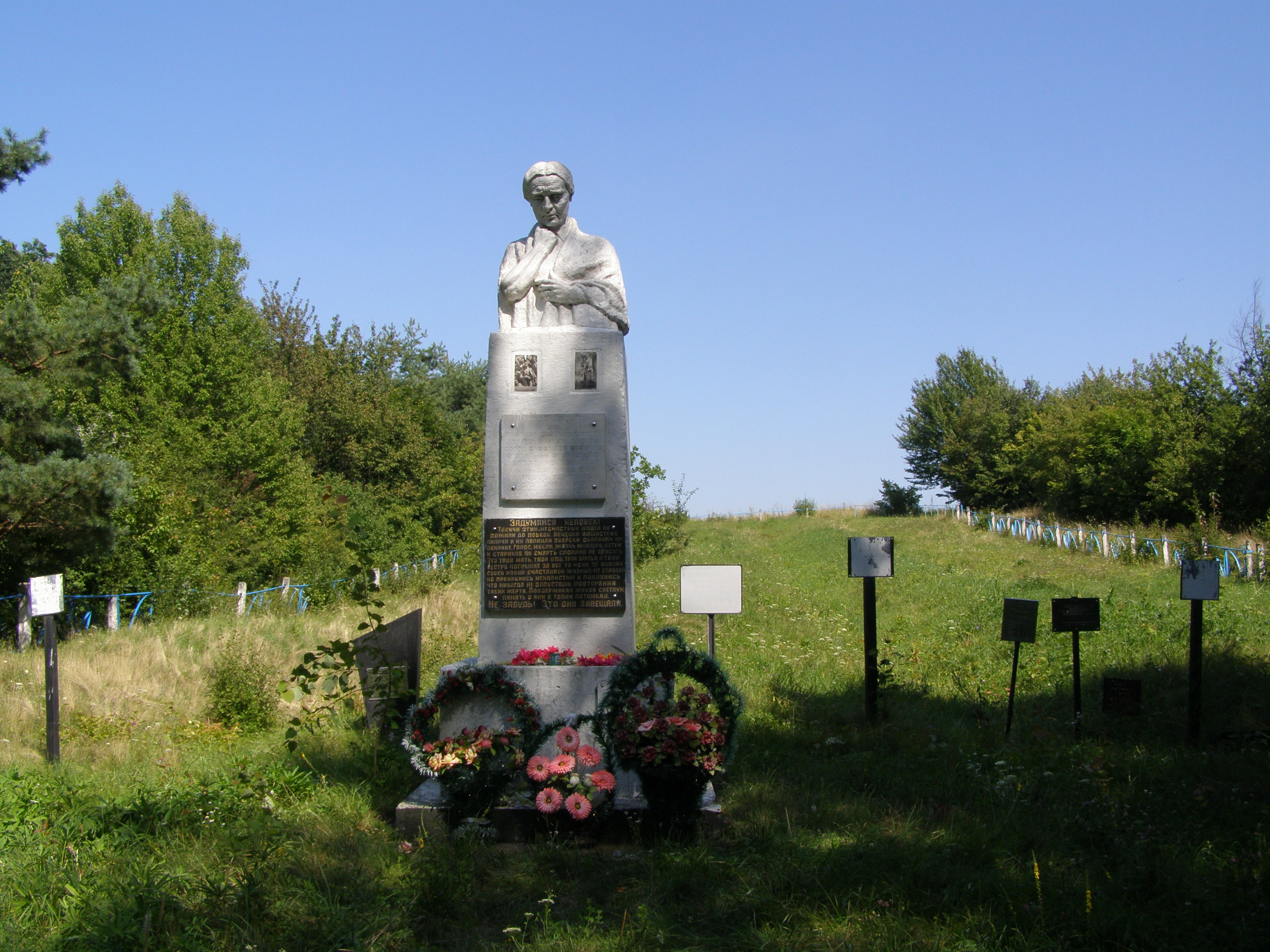
Monument at the mass graves, Jewish cemetery

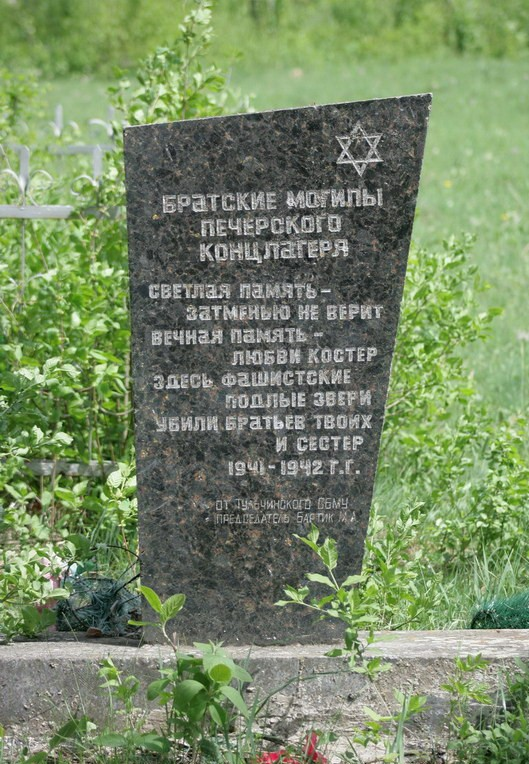
Monument at the mass graves, Jewish cemetery

== See also ==
- History of the Jews in Bessarabia
- History of the Jews in Transnistria
- History of the Jews in Bukovina
- Vapniarka concentration camp
- Mohyliv-Podilskyi
