= History of the Jews in Moldova =

Moldovan Jews Evreii din Moldova יהודים מולדובים
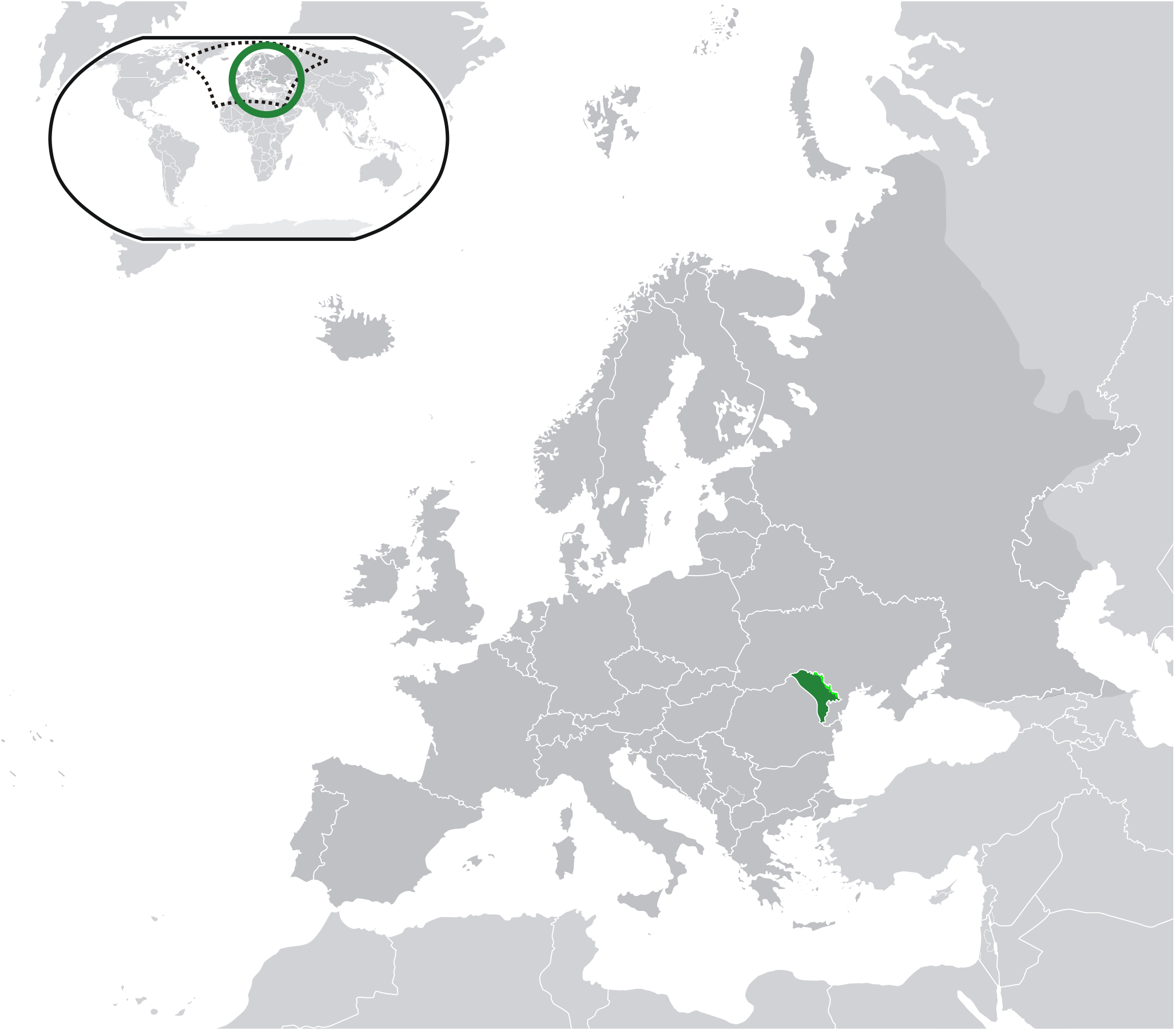
- The location of Moldova (dark and light green) in Europe

Total population
- est. 110,000

Regions with significant populations
- Israel: 100,000
- Moldova: 10,000 (2026)
- Romania: ~1,000

Languages
- Hebrew (in Israel), Romanian, Russian, Yiddish

Religion
- Judaism

The history of the Jews in Moldova extends back several centuries. According to some accounts, Jews first appeared in the territory of modern Moldova with Roman legions in the first century, although documented Jewish activity in the region dates from the medieval period. Jewish merchants are documented using a trade route through Moldavia during the second half of the 15th century. The first Jewish settlements in central and northern Bessarabia were probably established in the 17th century.

Prior to the Second World War, violent antisemitic movements across the Bessarabian region badly affected the region's Jewish population. In the 1930s and '40s, under the Romanian governments of Octavian Goga and Ion Antonescu (the latter whom sided with Nazi Germany in the war) government-directed pogroms and mass deportations led to the concentration and extermination of Jewish citizens followed, leading to the extermination of between 45,000-60,000 Jews across Bessarabia. The total number of Romanian and Ukrainian Jews who perished in territories under Romanian administration is between 280,000 and 380,000.

Today, the Jewish community in Moldova has been revived and are primarily represented by the Jewish Community of the Republic of Moldova (JCM) organisation. The group was registered in its current form in 1997, but its roots stretch back to founding of the Union of Jewish Communities in Bessarabia on 3 November 1935. The group estimate that the total population of Moldovan Jews in 2022 to be approx. 20,000. The World Jewish Congress (of which the JCM is an affiliate member) states that there has been "a widespread development of a national self-consciousness and a return to their roots by the Jews of Moldova, with Jewish identity and culture being celebrated in a number of forms". Diplomatic relations with Israel began in 1992 and the Israeli consulate is located in the capital city, Chişinău. Since 2014, Moldova has been an observer country to the International Holocaust Remembrance Alliance, and since 2019 has adopted the IHRA Working Definition of Antisemitism for official use. The Museum of Jewish History was opened in Orhei on 30 January 2023.

There is one Jewish kindergarten in Chişinău, two Jewish schools and a municipal Jewish library named after Itzik Manger. A Jewish newspaper, Nash Golos ("Our Voice"), is published twice a month by the Jewish Community of the Republic of Moldova. There is a Jewish Cultural Center in Chişinău, as well as seven synagogues, with synagogues also present in Orhei, Soroca, and Tiraspol, and "Memorials to the Kishinev ghetto, to the Victims of Fascism, to the Victims of Chişinău Pogrom are sites for remembrance in Chişinău." Other organisations include Chabad Lubavitch Moldova and Kedem.

The constitution of Moldova guarantees the right to freedom of religion and the total separation of church and state, while noting the "exceptional importance" of Orthodox Christianity. Holocaust denial and insulting the memory of the Holocaust are criminal offences. The "production, sale, distribution, or public use of fascist, racist, or xenophobic symbols or ideology, unless used for art, science, or education. The law prohibits the promotion of xenophobia, racism, fascism, and hatred and violence on ethnic, racial, or religious grounds." Since 2015, 27 January is annually recognised as the National Holocaust Remembrance Day. In 2016, the Moldovan parliament endorsed the Final Report of the International Commission on the Holocaust in Romania by Elie Wiesel. Discrimination on the basis of religious affiliation is illegal, and incitement to religious and ethnic hatred was made illegal in May 2022.

== Bessarabian Jews ==
=== Early history ===
The inauguration of the Tsar Alexander II Monument in Chișinău. Many local Jews and Stars of David are visible, as a display of the Bessarabian Jews' loyalty to the House of Romanov

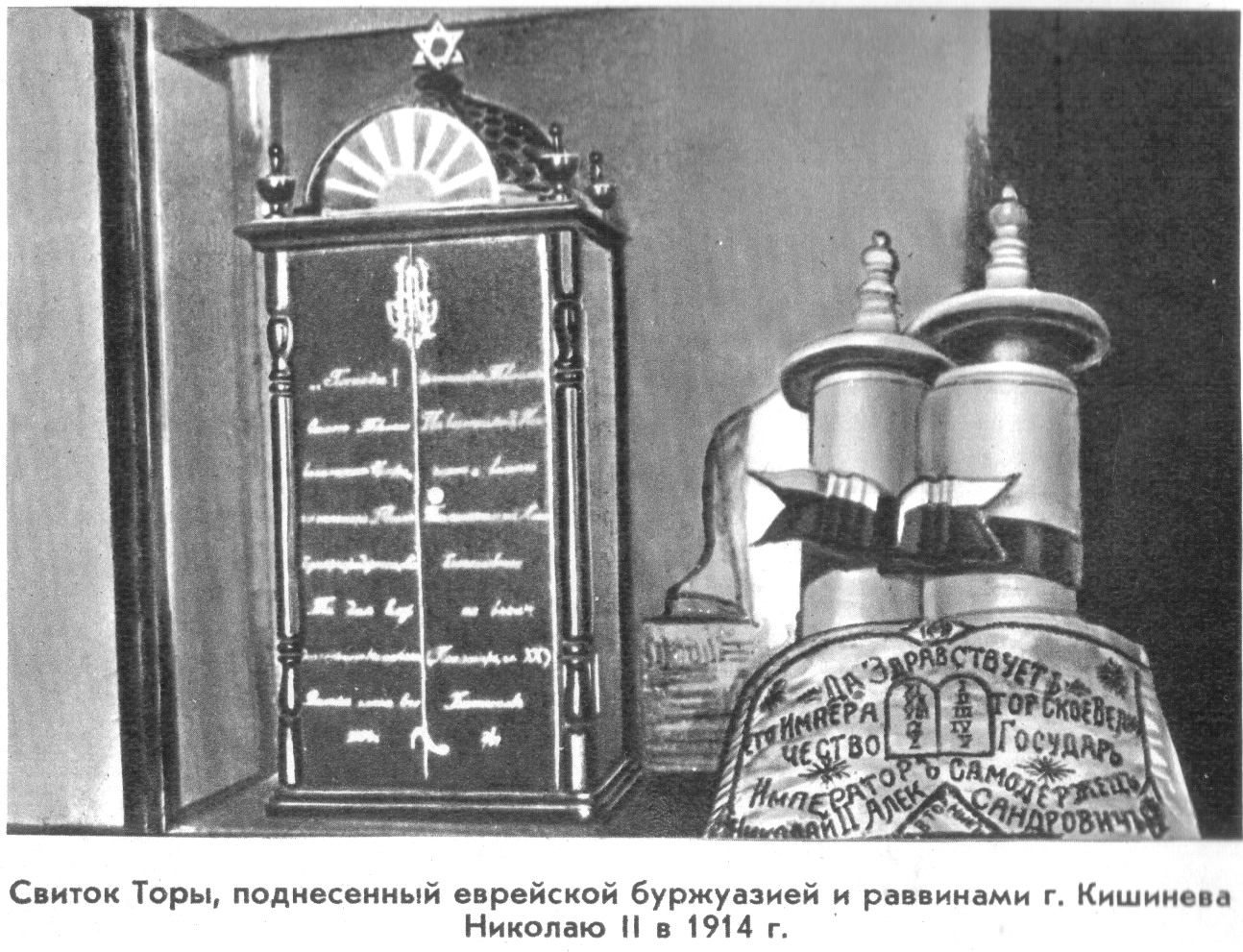
Torah scrolls presented by Jewish community of Chișinău to Nicholas II in 1914

- 1889: There were 180,918 Jews of a total population of 1,628,867 in Bessarabia.
- 1897: The Jewish population had grown to 225,637 of a total of 1,936,392.
- 1903: Chișinău (Kishinev) in Russian Bessarabia had a Jewish population of 50,000, or 46%, out of a total of approximately 110,000. While almost non-existent in the countryside, Jews had been present in all major towns since the end of the 18th century and the beginning of the 19th. Jewish life flourished with 16 Jewish schools and over 2,000 pupils in Chișinău alone.
- 19 - 21 April 1903: The Kishinev pogrom occurs.
- 1920: The Jewish population had grown to approximately 267,000.
- 1930: Romanian census registers 270,000 Jews.

=== Kishinev pogrom ===
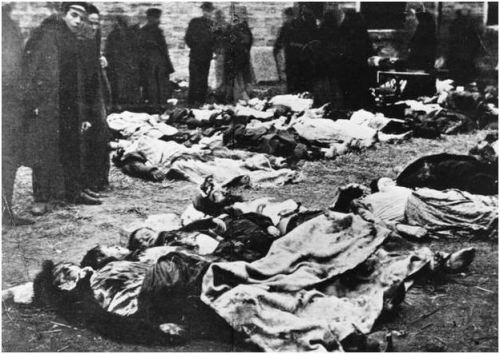
Kishinev pogrom (19-21 April 1903)

In 1903, a young Christian Orthodox boy, Mikhail Rybachenko, was found murdered in the town of Dubăsari (Dubossary), 37 km northeast of Chișinău. A Russian language antisemitic newspaper "Bessarabian", published by Pavel Krushevan, began to disseminate rumors about the murder being part of a Jewish ritual. This newspaper had been publishing rumors about the Jews that brought ruin to the local Jewish population. As for the murder, it reported that the victim visited the shop of a Jewish tobacconist before his disappearance. Other anti-Semitic newspapers called for a pogrom. Although the official investigation had determined the lack of any ritualism in the murder and eventually discovered that the boy had been killed by a relative (who was later found), the unrest caused by these and other rumors had resulted in a major pogrom during the Easter holidays. The pogrom lasted for three days, without the intervention of the police. Forty seven (some say 49) Jews were killed, 92 severely wounded, 500 slightly wounded and over 700 houses destroyed.

Many of the younger Jews, including Mendel Portugali, made an effort to defend the community. There was outcry from prominent Russian writers Leo Tolstoy and Maksim Gorky, as well as protests from Jews and non-Jews in Europe and the United States. Haim Nachman Bialik wrote about the pogrom in his poem, "The City of Slaughter", and Vladimir Korolenko in his book, House No. 13.

=== The Holocaust ===
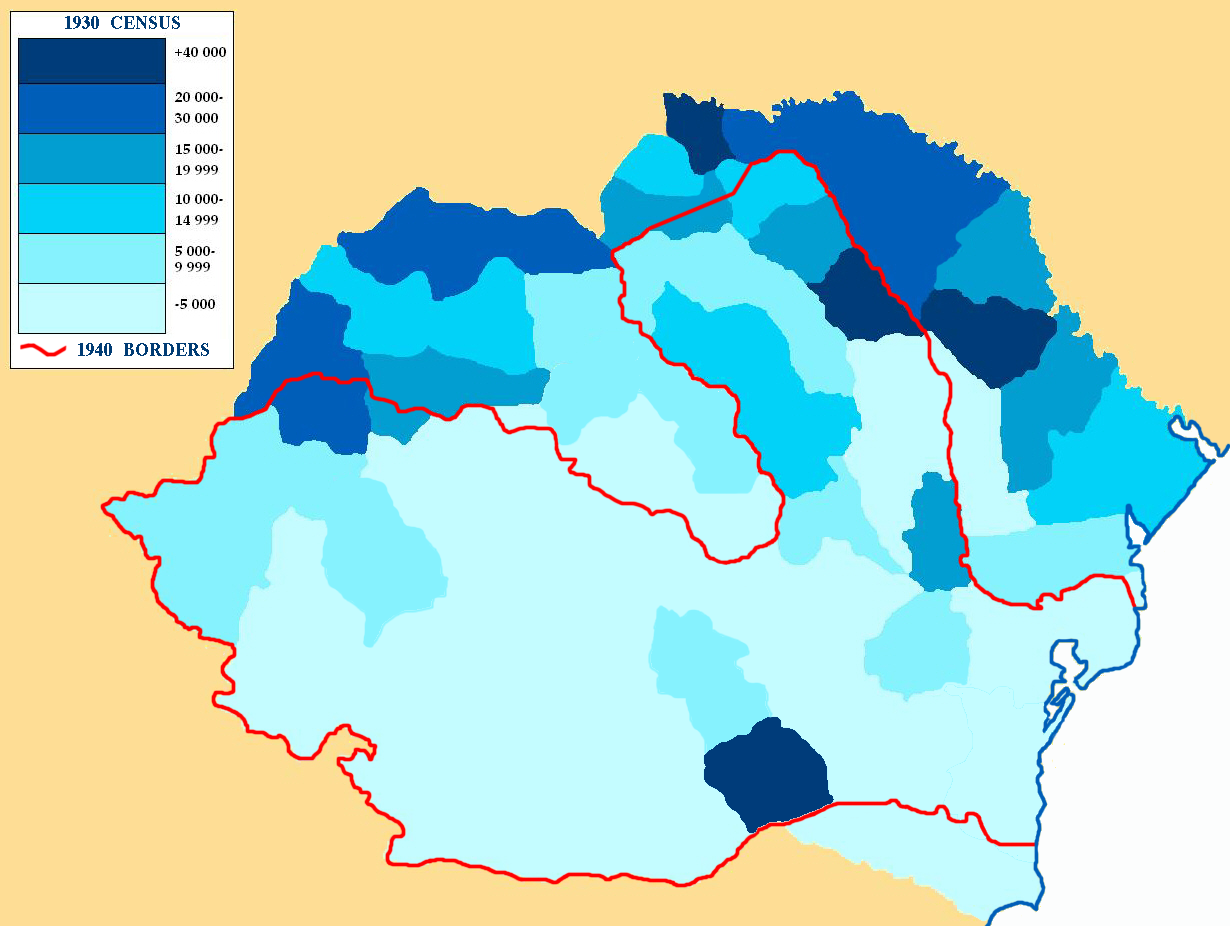
Jewish population per county in Greater Romania, according to the 1930 census

During the Soviet occupation of Bessarabia and Northern Bukovina, around 30,000 Jews fled from the Soviet-annexed territories to Romania, while around 9,500 Jews fled from Romania to the USSR.

Up to two-thirds of Bessarabian Jews fled before the retreat of the Soviet troops. 110,033 people from Bessarabia and Bukovina (the latter included at the time the counties of Cernăuţi, Storojineţ, Rădăuţi, Suceava, Câmpulung, and Dorohoi – approximately 100,000 Jews) – all except a small minority of the Jews that did not flee in 1941 – were deported to the Transnistria Governorate, a region which was under Romanian military control during 1941–44.

- 1941: The Einsatzkommandos, German mobile killing units drawn from the Nazi-Schutzstaffel (SS) and commanded by Otto Ohlendorf entered Bessarabia. They were instrumental in the massacre of many Jews in Bessarabia, who did not flee in face of the German advancement.
- 8 July 1941: Ion Antonescu, Romania's ruler at the time, made a declaration in front of the Ministers' Council:

... With the risk of not being understood by some traditionalists which may be among you, I am in favour of the forced migration of the entire Jew element from Bessarabia and Bukovina, which must be thrown over the border. Also, I am in favor of the forced migration of the Ukrainian element, which does not belong here at this time. I don't care if we appear in history as barbarians. The Roman Empire has made a series of barbaric acts from a contemporary point of view and, still, was the greatest political settlement. There has never been a more suitable moment. If necessary, shoot with the machine gun.

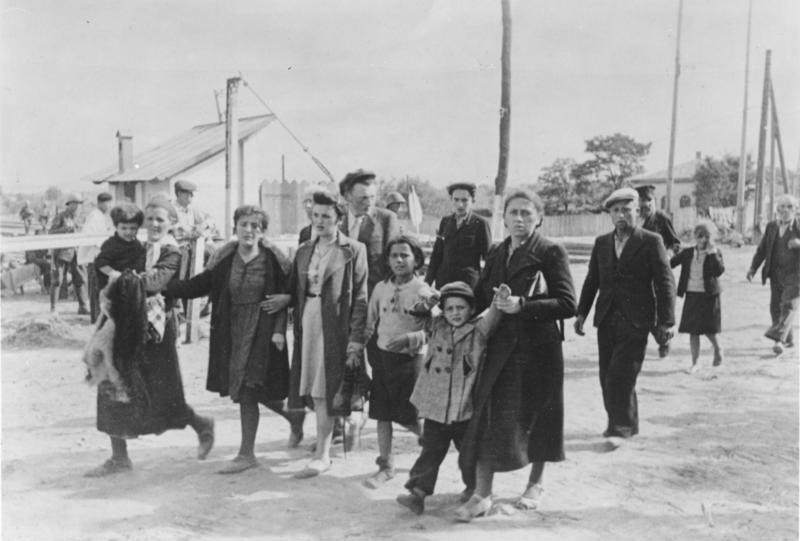
Deportation of Jews in Chisinau by Romanian soldiers in July 1941

The killing squads of Einsatzgruppe D, together with special non-military units attached to the German Wehrmacht and the Romanian army were involved in many massacres in Bessarabia (over 10,000 in a single month of war, in June–July 1941), while deporting other thousands to Transnistria. From 1941 to 1942, those Jews deported to territories to distant regions of USSR and war zones on orders of Marshal Antonescu reached 56,089. A huge number of this population perished during the occupation of those territories. The number of Jewish deportees to Transnistria sent there in 1941 who reached the latter province included 110,033 people, including 55,867 from Bessarabia, 43,798 from Bukovina, 10,368 from Dorohoi County (minus the Hertsa area); out of these, 50,741 still survived by September 1, 1943. On May 20, 1942, 204 Jews from Chisinau were deported to Transnistria, while on July 10, 1942, other 27 Chisinau Jews were deported to Transnistria; the total number of Jews deported from Chisinau to Transnistria in 1942 was 231. In 1942, it was decided that 753 Bessarabian Jews (96 urban and 657 rural) would not be deported, while 26 Bessarabian Jews who were slated for deportation were not deported. According to Jean Ancel, hundreds, probably thousands, of Bessarabian and Transnistrian, and to a lesser extent Bukovinian Jewish children were handed over by their parents to non-Jews in order to guarantee their survival.

In Nazi ghettos organized in several towns, as well as in Nazi concentration camps (there was also a comparable number of Jews from Transnistria in those camps) many people died from starvation or bad sanitation, or were shot by special Nazi units right before the arrival of Soviet troops in 1944. The Romanian military administration of Transnistria kept very poor records of the people in the ghettos and camps. The only exact number found in Romanian sources is 59,392 died in the ghettos and camps from the moment those were open until mid-1943 This number includes all internees regardless of their origin, but does not include those that perished on the way to the camps, those that perished between mid-1943 and spring 1944, as well as those that perished in the immediate aftermath of the Romanian army's occupation of Transnistria (see for example the Odessa massacre). According to the Romanian gendarmerie, on September 1, 1943, 50,741 Jewish deportees survived in Transnistria, including 36,761 from Bukovina, including Dorohoi County (historically a part of the Old Kingdom of Romania, but administratively a part of Bukovina at that time), and 13,980 from Bessarabia. According to the statistics from the office of the Romanian prime minister of November 15, 1943, by province of origin from Romania and of county of residence in Transnistria, in the latter area there were 49,927 Jewish deportees who had survived, including 31,141 from Bukovina (without Dorohoi County, but including Hotin County), 11,683 from Bessarabia (without Hotin County), 6,425 from Dorohoi County, and 678 from the rest of Romania. The same document indicates that there were 706 Jews sent there from the rest of Romania (the Old Kingdom and southern Transylvania) in the camp at Grosulovo, which brings the total number of Jews deported from Romania still alive in Transnistria to 50,633. On March 14, 1944, Romania's military dictator Ion Antonescu allowed the repatriation of all the Jews deported to Transnistria.

Site	Romanian-era classification / function	Present-day location	Notes	English Wikipedia article
Akhmechetka / Acmecetca	Camp / extermination site	Prybuzhzhya, Mykolaiv Oblast, Ukraine	One of the principal killing camps in Golta County, where thousands of Jews were murdered.	Akhmechetka concentration camp
Ananiev	Ghetto	Ananiv, Odesa Oblast, Ukraine	A ghetto was established after Ananiev became part of Romanian-administered Transnistria in September 1941. About 300 remaining Jews were confined there and were subsequently murdered near Mostovoye while being marched toward Dubăsari.	—
Balanivka / Balanovca	Ghetto / transit site	Balanivka, Vinnytsia Oblast, Ukraine	Established in October 1941 as a ghetto and transit site for Jewish deportees from Bessarabia and Bukovina. About 3,500 Jews were initially confined in roofless cowsheds, and thousands died from cold, malnutrition, disease and poor sanitary conditions.	—
Balta	Ghetto	Balta, Odesa Oblast, Ukraine	A ghetto was established in October 1941 and held local Jews, Jews from elsewhere in Ukraine, and deportees from Bessarabia and Bukovina. About 4,000 Jews were initially confined there.	—
Bershad	Ghetto	Bershad, Vinnytsia Oblast, Ukraine	One of the major ghettos of Romanian-administered Transnistria; it held local Jews and large numbers of deportees from Bessarabia and Bukovina, many of whom suffered from overcrowding, hunger and disease.	—
Bobryk / Bobric	Camp / ghetto	Bobryk, Odesa Oblast, Ukraine	One of the sites used by Romanian authorities to concentrate Jewish deportees in Transnistria before intended expulsion across the Bug River into German-controlled territory.	—
Bogdanovka	Colony / concentration camp	Bohdanivka, Mykolaiv Oblast, Ukraine	Major site of mass murder in Golta County. Tens of thousands of Jews were murdered there between December 1941 and January 1942.	Bogdanovka concentration camp
Bratslav	Ghetto	Bratslav, Vinnytsia Oblast, Ukraine	Ghetto established in September 1941 for local Jews, Jews from the surrounding district and deportees from Bessarabia and Bukovina. Most inmates were transferred to the Pechora concentration camp around the beginning of January 1942.	—
Camenca	Ghetto	Camenca, present-day Moldova	Ghetto in Romanian-administered Transnistria that held local Jews and deportees; as elsewhere in Transnistria, Jews confined in ghettos were subjected to forced labour and severe shortages of food and other necessities.	—
Cicelnic / Chechelnik	Ghetto	Chechelnyk, Vinnytsia Oblast, Ukraine	A barbed-wire-enclosed ghetto held about 1,000 local Jews and survivors from neighbouring communities, followed by more than 1,000 deportees from Bukovina and Bessarabia. Inmates were subjected to forced labour, and about one-third died during a typhus epidemic in the winter of 1941–1942.	—
Domanovka / Domanevca	Camp	Domanivka, Mykolaiv Oblast, Ukraine	Major detention and killing site in Golta County, where Romanian authorities carried out mass murder of Jews.	Domanovka concentration camp
Dubăsari	Ghetto / mass killing site	Dubăsari, present-day Moldova	Romanian authorities established a ghetto consisting of two streets and confined about 2,500 Jews from Dubăsari district there. In September 1941, members of Einsatzkommando 12 began murdering the ghetto's inmates in mass shootings outside the town.	—
Dzhurin	Ghetto	Dzhuryn, Vinnytsia Oblast, Ukraine	Ghetto under Romanian occupation that held local Jews and deportees from Romania, including Jews from Bessarabia and Bukovina.	—
Dzyhivka	Ghetto	Dzygivka, Vinnytsia Oblast, Ukraine	Jews were concentrated in a ghetto shortly after the German occupation in July 1941. After the town became part of Romanian-administered Transnistria, about 100 deportees from Bukovina and Bessarabia were brought there, and inmates were subjected to forced labour.	—
Grosulovo	Internment camp	Velyka Mykhailivka, Odesa Oblast, Ukraine	A camp established in a dilapidated tobacco depot in autumn 1941 initially held local Ukrainian Jews and Jews deported from Bessarabia and Bukovina. In October 1943 hundreds of Jewish and non-Jewish political prisoners were transferred there from Vapniarka.	Grosulovo internment camp
Iampol	Ghetto / deportation transit point	Yampil, Vinnytsia Oblast, Ukraine	One of the crossing points through which Jews deported from Bessarabia and Bukovina entered Transnistria; deportees were subsequently distributed among camps and ghettos in the governorate.	—
Mohyliv-Podilskyi / Mogilev	Ghetto / transit centre	Mohyliv-Podilskyi, Vinnytsia Oblast, Ukraine	One of the principal entry points for Jews deported from Bessarabia and Bukovina and the site of one of the largest ghettos in Transnistria. About 25,000 Bessarabian Jews passed through a transit camp there in 1941.	—
Murafa	Ghetto	Murafa, Vinnytsia Oblast, Ukraine	Ghetto in Romanian-administered Transnistria that became a destination for Jewish deportees, including Jews from Bukovina.	—
Mytky	Camp / ghetto	Vinnytsia Oblast, Ukraine	One of the northern Transnistrian sites designated by Romanian authorities for concentrating Jews before their intended expulsion across the Bug River.	—
Obodivka / Obodovka / Obodovca	Ghetto / transit camp	Obodivka, Vinnytsia Oblast, Ukraine	One of the principal concentration and transit sites used for Jews deported into Transnistria; deportees were confined under extremely poor conditions.	Obodivka internment camp
Olgopol	Ghetto	Olhopil, Vinnytsia Oblast, Ukraine	A ghetto was established for the remaining local Jews and several hundred deportees from Bessarabia and Bukovina. Inmates were subjected to forced labour, hunger and a typhus epidemic.	—
Pechora / Pecioara	Concentration camp	Pechera, Vinnytsia Oblast, Ukraine	One of two sites described by the United States Holocaust Memorial Museum as concentration camps established by Romanian authorities in Transnistria; prisoners died in large numbers from starvation, exposure and disease.	Pechora concentration camp
Golta	Ghetto / forced-labour and internment sites	Pervomaisk, Mykolaiv Oblast, Ukraine	Administrative centre of Golta County, a district containing several major Romanian detention and killing sites, including Bogdanovka, Domanovka and Akhmechetka.	—
Rohizka / Rogozna	Camp / ghetto	Vinnytsia Oblast, Ukraine	One of the northern Transnistrian sites designated by Romanian authorities for concentrating Jews before their intended expulsion across the Bug River.	—
Șargorod	Ghetto	Sharhorod, Vinnytsia Oblast, Ukraine	A major ghetto that held local Jews and thousands of deportees. About 5,000 Jews from Bessarabia and Bukovina were deported to Sharhorod in late 1941, joining approximately 2,000 local Jews.	—
Slobidka	Ghetto / transit camp	Odesa, Odesa Oblast, Ukraine	Romanian authorities confined thousands of Jews in the Slobidka ghetto. In January 1942 it became the principal assembly and transit point for the deportation of Odesa's remaining Jews to other parts of Transnistria.	—
Slivina	Forced-labour camp	Slyvyne, Mykolaiv Oblast, Ukraine	Forced-labour camp established in spring 1943 during German bridge and road construction operations near the Southern Bug. Jews from ghettos elsewhere in Transnistria were transferred there for forced labour.	—
Șpikov	Ghetto	Shpykiv, Vinnytsia Oblast, Ukraine	Ghetto in Romanian-administered Transnistria that held local Jews and deportees; Jews from Shpykiv were among those transferred to the Pechora concentration camp.	—
Tiraspol	Ghetto / transit and forced-labour centre	Tiraspol, present-day Moldova	An important transit point for Jews deported into Transnistria. A small ghetto developed around Jewish craftsmen retained in the city, and several forced-labour centres subsequently operated there.	—
Tomashpil	Ghetto	Tomashpil, Vinnytsia Oblast, Ukraine	Romanian authorities confined the town's Jews in a barbed-wire-enclosed ghetto in December 1941. Inmates lived in severe overcrowding and were used for forced labour, while hunger and infectious disease were widespread.	—
Tulcin	Ghetto	Tulchyn, Vinnytsia Oblast, Ukraine	A ghetto was established in October 1941. On 13 December about 3,000 Jews were deported from Tulcin to the Pechora concentration camp, while a smaller number of skilled workers were initially retained in the town.	—
Vapniarka	Concentration camp	Vapniarka, Vinnytsia Oblast, Ukraine	Concentration camp used primarily for Jewish political prisoners deported from Romania. Hundreds developed lathyrism after prisoners were fed toxic Lathyrus sativus peas.	Vapniarka concentration camp

== The Moldavian Soviet Socialist Republic ==
After World War II, the number of Jews in Moldavian Soviet Socialist Republic increased significantly, peaking at 98,001 in 1970. During the 1970s Soviet Union aliyah and immigration to the West and especially in the late 1980s, many of them emigrated to Israel, United States, Canada and some to Australia and Western Europe. The last Soviet census of 1989 registered 65,672 Jews in the Soviet Republic.

== Contemporary situation ==
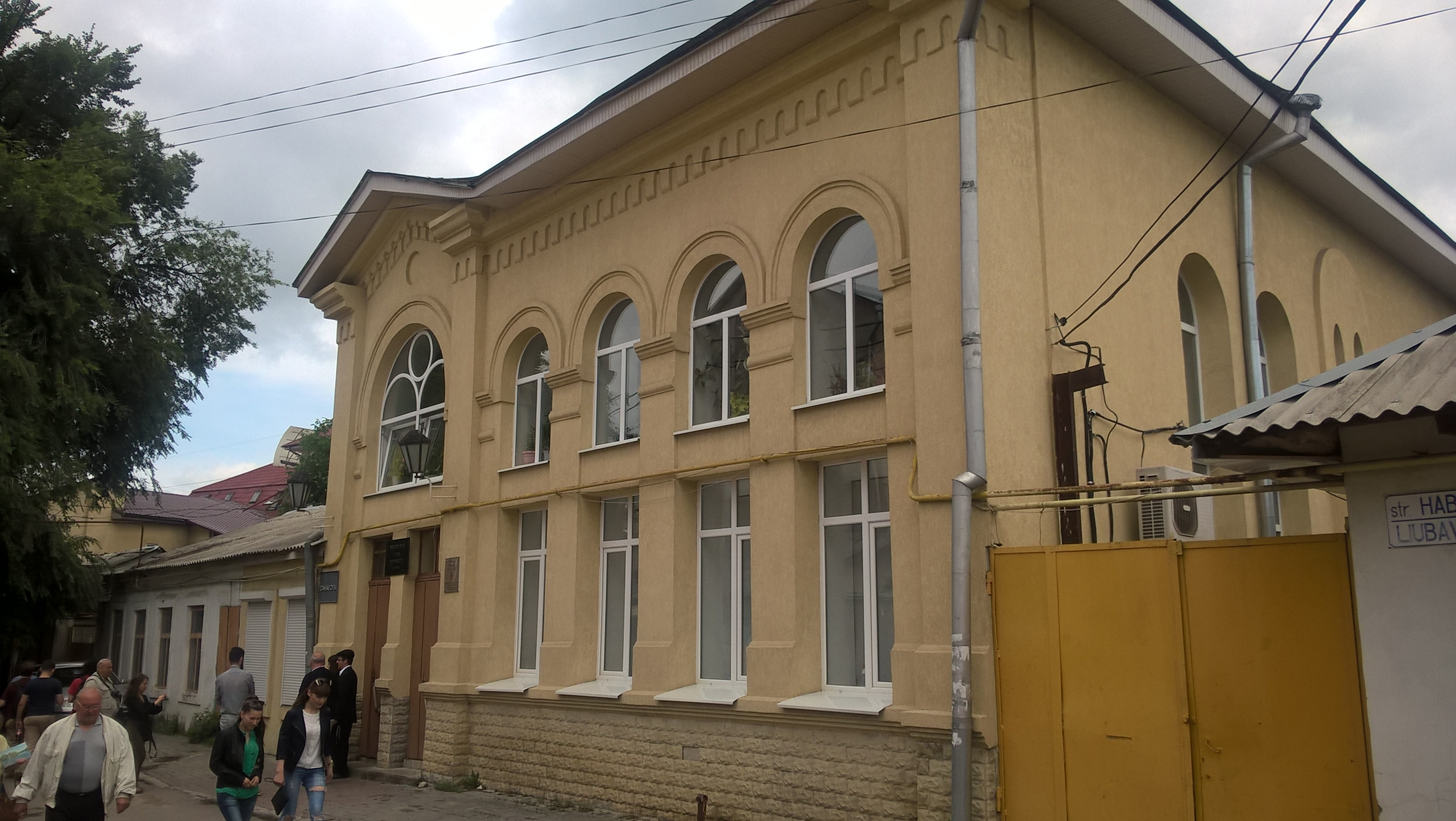
Synagogue of the Glaziers, Chișinău

As of 2014, there are an estimated 15,000 Jews in Moldova, including over 10,000 in Chișinău alone. At the same time, there are 75,492 Moldovan Jews living in Israel, and also small communities in other parts of the world, such as Russia, the US, the UK, Germany, Romania, Australia, etc.

Since 2015, 27 January is annually recognised as the National Holocaust Remembrance Day. In 2016, the Moldovan parliament endorsed the Final Report of the International Commission on the Holocaust in Romania by Elie Wiesel. Discrimination on the basis of religious affiliation is illegal, and incitement to religious and ethnic hatred was made illegal in May 2022.

However, antisemitism is still commonplace; several churches and political organisations still refer to antisemitic rhetoric. In addition, far-right and neo-Nazi groups are active in the country. Because religion was heavily restricted in Soviet times, it is likely that there are many more people of ethnic Jewish heritage in Moldova than those who practice the religion, but many simply may not know about it.

In 2024, the Action and Protection League (based in Brussels) and the European Jewish Association published a poll surveying 1,000 Moldovans. According to the results of the poll (reported by The Times of Israel), "a majority of the 923 respondents indicated that they were either neutral on Jews (27%) or associated them (35%) with “positive” qualities, including “respect, intelligent, smart, normal people, capable, ordinary, educated." The 19% percent who reported negative reactions associated Jews with such concepts as “greedy, calculating, cunning, traitors, crucifixion of Christ, bad people, foreign culture, charlatans, speculators, dirty, deceit, selfish.” Nearly half of respondents, or 48%, said they didn’t like Jews, with 13% saying they “really dislike” them, but 40% said they “really like” Jews. Compared to other ethnicities, Jews were more liked in the poll than Roma (28%), Poles (34%); immigrants (34%) and the Gagauz (39%), a Turkic ethnic group."

In response to the poll, the director of the European Jewish Association lobby group, Rabbi Menachem Margolin stated that "deep-rooted antisemitism persists in Moldova. There can be no rational explanation as to why a community that represents such a tiny fraction of the overall population bears the brunt of such an alarmingly high number of stereotypes and tropes.” As of December 8,2024 Rabbi Yitzchok Dovid Grossman has issued an appeal for Nosson Malul who has been imprisoned for nearly a year in Moldavia without trial.

The Chief Rabbi of Moldova is Rabbi Pinhas Zaltzman.

== Notable figures ==
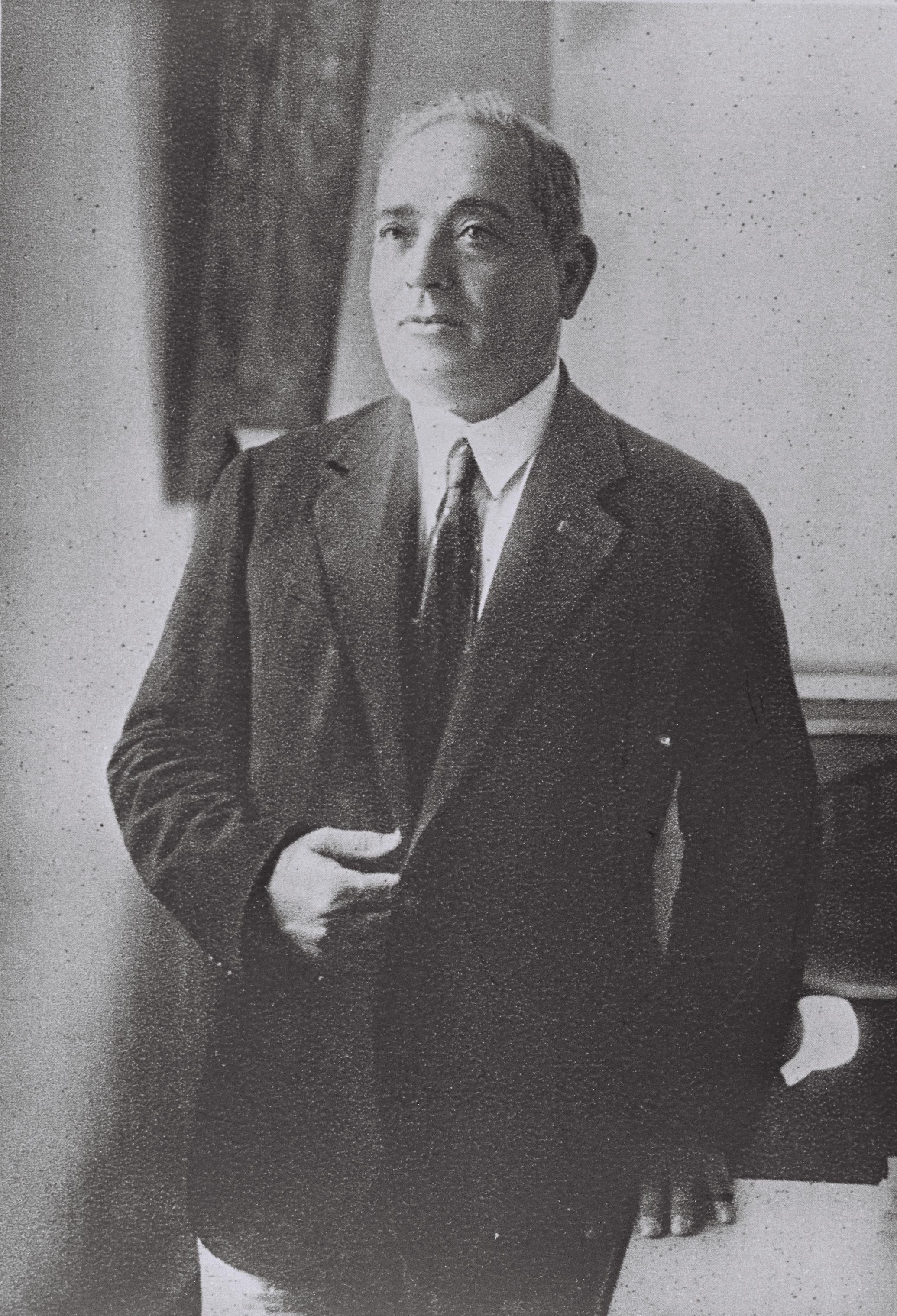
Meir Dizengoff (1861-1936), first mayor of Tel Aviv, Israel.

- Alexandru Hâjdeu (1811-1872). Writer, founding member of the Romanian Academy.
- Anton Rubinstein (1829-1894). Composer, pianist, conductor.
- Yehuda Leib Tsirelson (1859-1941). Rabbi, writer.
- Meir Dizengoff (1861-1936). First mayor of Tel Aviv, Israel.
- Shmuel Cohen (1870-1940). Composer of Israel's national anthem 'Hatikvah'.
- Anna Tumarkin (1875-1951). Philosopher and psychologist.
- Lev Berg (1876-1950). Ichthyologist, geographer, and zoologist.
- Lewis Milestone (1895-1980). Film director, first winner of two Academy Awards.
- Dovid Knut (1900-1955). Poet and member of the French Resistance.
- Lazar Dubinovschi (1910-1982), sculptor.
- Liviu Deleanu (1911-1967). Poet and writer, author of the MSSR anthem.
- Yaakov Yardaur (1912-1997), Lehi militant
- Izi Diamond (1920-1988). Screenwriter, Oscar Award-winner.
- Isidor Burdin (1914-1999). Conductor and composer, instrumental in the revitalization of folk music in Moldova.
- Avigdor Lieberman (1958–present). Israeli politician.
- Saul Perlmutter (1959–present). Astrophysicist, Nobel Prize winner.
- Marina Tauber (1986-present). Politician, mayor of Jora de Mijloc, and member of parliament.
- Ilan Shor (1987-present). Politician, mayor of Orhei, and founder of Șor, a Moldovan political party.
- Isaac Bersuker (1928-present). Member of Academy of Sciences of Moldova and theoretical physicist known for discoveries pertaining to the Jahn-Teller effect.
- Marina Shafir (1988-), professional wrestler and mixed martial artist

== See also ==
- Israel–Moldova relations
- History of the Jews in Chișinău
- History of the Jews in Romania
- History of the Jews in Transnistria
- History of the Jews in Ukraine
- History of the Jews in Bessarabia
- History of the Jews in Bukovina
- Bogdanovka concentration camp
- Shargorod
- Mohyliv-Podilskyi
- Domanivka
- Jewish Roots in Ukraine and Moldova
