= Sabin Motora =

- Born: 1892; Câmpeni, Alba County, Romania
- Died: December 12, 1970 (aged 77–78); Târgu Mureș, Romania
- Occupation: Officer in the Romanian Gendarmerie
- Known for: Rescue of Jewish prisoners from Vapniarka and Grosulovo
- Awards: Righteous Among the Nations (1983)

Sabin Motora (1892 – 12 December 1970) was a Romanian career officer in the Romanian Gendarmerie who protected Jewish political prisoners during the Holocaust in Romania. During World War II, he commanded internment camps at Vapniarka and Grosulovo in the Romanian-administered Transnistria Governorate. As commander of Vapniarka, he improved prisoners' food and treatment and permitted them to obtain food from the local market and contact their families.

As the Red Army advanced toward Transnistria, Motora was ordered to transfer the prisoners eastward, where they were to be handed over to German authorities. Instead, he moved them westward to Grosulovo, closer to the Romanian border. In March 1944, during the evacuation of Transnistria, he succeeded in transferring the prisoners into Bessarabia and arranged for them to be treated as Romanian army employees rather than political prisoners. They were subsequently returned to Romania and interned at the Târgu Jiu camp, where they remained until their liberation following the overthrow of the Ion Antonescu government in August 1944.

For his actions, Motora was posthumously recognized by Yad Vashem as Righteous Among the Nations on 3 March 1983.

== Early life and military career ==
Motora was born in 1892 in Câmpeni, in the Apuseni Mountains. His family was involved in the political and cultural life of Romanians in the Mureș region. He completed commercial studies before being mobilized in 1915 as an officer in the Austro-Hungarian Army during World War I. Less than two years later he crossed the Carpathian Mountains and entered the Romanian Army.

In 1920 he transferred to the Romanian Gendarmerie with the rank of captain. By the mid-1930s he had been promoted to major, and from 1934 to 1937 he commanded the Gendarmerie Training Centre at Lugoj. During this period he served alongside military physician Ștefan Odobleja.

== Second World War ==
=== Caracal and Vapniarka ===
During the Second World War, Motora initially commanded the internment camp at Caracal. He was subsequently appointed commander of the Vapniarka camp in Romanian-controlled Transnistria, in what is now Ukraine.

During the second half of September 1942, 1,201 Jewish political prisoners were deported to Vapniarka, including 407 from Târgu Jiu, 72 from Caransebeș and 722 arrested in Romanian cities. Prisoners at the camp included Jewish deportees and Romanian Jews detained as communists, anti-fascists, political prisoners or for other alleged offences. Earlier conditions had been extremely harsh, and hundreds of prisoners suffered poisoning and neurological illness after being fed fodder peas containing the toxic amino acid ODAP.

According to Yad Vashem, conditions improved after Motora became commander. Food supplies improved, officers and gendarmes treated the prisoners better, and detainees were permitted to obtain food from the local market and establish contact with their families. Prisoners were also permitted greater freedom to organize their internal life, including a canteen and cultural and religious activities.

The Final Report of the International Commission on the Holocaust in Romania later cited Motora as one of the Romanian officials who acted to protect Jews during the Holocaust.

=== Transfer to Grosulovo ===
As the Red Army advanced toward the borders of Transnistria, Romanian authorities prepared to evacuate Vapniarka. Motora was ordered to transfer the prisoners eastward, where they were to be handed over to the Germans. Instead, he arranged for them to be moved in the opposite direction, to Grosulovo (present-day Velyka Mykhailivka, Ukraine), which was closer to the Romanian border.

Motora remained in command of the prisoners at Grosulovo. Several prisoners from the Slivina camp were also transferred there. Conditions were comparatively permissive: detainees were allowed to establish a canteen, work in agriculture outside the camp, obtain additional food, receive parcels and assistance from relatives and humanitarian organizations, and organize cultural activities.

Former prisoner Ștefan Voicu later described Motora's conduct at Grosulovo in an extended recollection published in România literară in 1978. Voicu, who had been imprisoned at Vapniarka and Grosulovo, recalled that Motora allowed some prisoners considerable freedom of movement when carrying out tasks outside the camp.

In early 1944, Voicu was twice permitted to travel from Grosulovo to Rîbnița on behalf of the prisoners' underground Communist organization. Motora provided him with official service and railway travel documents and arranged for a gendarme to accompany him nominally as an escort. Voicu recalled that the arrangement allowed him considerable freedom while travelling outside the camp.

Voicu travelled to Rîbnița again in March 1944 to investigate the situation of political prisoners held there. He arrived at the prison on 16 March, shortly before German forces took control of the town and carried out the Rîbnița massacre. Voicu subsequently returned toward Grosulovo and rejoined Motora and the prisoners during their evacuation toward Romania.

Motora's decision to move the prisoners toward Romania rather than surrender them to German custody became central to his later recognition as Righteous Among the Nations. Yad Vashem concluded that he acted to save Jewish lives despite risking both his military career and his life.

=== March 1944 evacuation ===
By early 1944 the Soviet advance threatened Romanian and German positions in Transnistria. Motora was ordered by the Romanian Ministry of Internal Affairs to evacuate the prisoners and return them to the political-prisoner camp at Târgu Jiu.

In March 1944 the main group left Grosulovo on foot for Tiraspol. Many were elderly, sick, disabled or physically weakened after years of internment. Accounts by former prisoners Matei Gall and Ștefan Voicu describe the evacuation as taking place amid the rapid collapse of Axis control in the region and the westward movement of Romanian and German forces.

According to an account by Vapniarka survivor Matei Gall, Motora learned during the march that German forces were preparing to take control of Tiraspol and had demanded that the prisoners be handed over to a German guard detail. He was also informed that the bridge across the Dniester from Tiraspol to Tighina in Bessarabia was expected to fall under German control that night.

Although the prisoners were exhausted after the march from Grosulovo, Motora ordered them to continue immediately toward the bridge. Romanian gendarmes escorted the column as German troops withdrew through the area, and the prisoners succeeded in crossing the Dniester before German Feldgendarmerie units reached the eastern side of the bridge.

Voicu described Motora as personally accompanying the prisoners during the evacuation and attempting to protect them as the military situation deteriorated. After crossing into Bessarabia, Motora continued to use his authority as commander of the guard to prevent the prisoners from falling into German custody.

After reaching Bessarabia, Motora took the additional step of ensuring that the prisoners were identified as Romanian army employees rather than political prisoners. According to Yad Vashem, this helped make possible their transfer back to Romania and ultimately to Târgu Jiu. The Federation of Jewish Communities of Romania described the crossing as the rescue of approximately 600 people from almost certain death.

Motora temporarily housed the prisoners in an abandoned cinema near the Dniester. A military field kitchen and washing facilities were made available, and the prisoners were able to wash themselves and their clothes. They remained there for approximately three weeks in quarantine before continuing their journey.

=== Return to Romania ===
Following the quarantine, Motora arranged railway transportation into Romania. The prisoners reached Bucharest and were subsequently transferred to the Târgu Jiu camp. According to Yad Vashem, they remained there until their liberation in August 1944.

Voicu provided additional details about the journey. He recalled that the train travelled westward through Galați, Buzău, Ploiești and Bucharest before continuing toward Târgu Jiu.

According to Voicu, news of the transport spread as it travelled through Romania. At railway stations, relatives and acquaintances attempted to meet the prisoners, while railway workers and others made contact with the detainees. In Bucharest, the presence of visitors around the train attracted the attention of the Siguranța and other security and intelligence bodies. Agents surrounded the railway yard, searched or temporarily detained some visitors and attempted to restrict contacts between railway workers and the prisoners.

Voicu recalled that Motora came under increasing pressure from his military superiors during the journey. Despite orders and criticism directed at him, Motora attempted to delay the transport at several points in the hope that changing circumstances might allow some of the prisoners to be released. At Filiași, according to Voicu, Motora delayed the train's departure for several hours, but the anticipated opportunity did not materialize and the transport continued to Târgu Jiu.

Accounts differ slightly as to the exact number in Motora's group. One Romanian account states that he began the return journey with 611 Jewish prisoners and brought 608 into Romania, with three escaping en route with the tacit cooperation of their guards. Other histories refer more generally to approximately 600 prisoners saved during the Grosulovo–Tiraspol evacuation.

Some Vapniarka prisoners did not accompany Motora's main group. Other groups were transferred elsewhere in Transnistria; a group of communist prisoners sent to Rîbnița was murdered by German SS personnel in March 1944.

== Investigation and post-war life ==
After returning to Romania, Motora's conduct toward the prisoners drew scrutiny from Romanian authorities. He was questioned for approximately three weeks by the Siguranța, the Special Intelligence Service and the General Inspectorate of the Gendarmerie on suspicion that he had colluded with the internees.

According to later Romanian accounts, investigators also examined a gold Schaffhausen watch that Motora had received from one of the prisoners. The gift had reportedly been given with the knowledge of the other detainees as an expression of gratitude for his treatment of them and for preventing their transfer to German custody.

After the war, many of the surviving prisoners emigrated to Israel and other countries. Others remained in Romania, and some former Vapniarka inmates later held senior positions under the country's communist government.

Voicu remained in contact with Motora after the war and later devoted an extended memoir to him. He recalled receiving news of Motora's death late on a Saturday night in December 1970. Severe winter weather and snow-covered roads prevented many former internees living elsewhere in Romania from travelling to Târgu Mureș for his funeral.

In his account, Voicu portrayed Motora as an exceptional figure among the officials responsible for political prisoners under the Antonescu regime. He emphasized Motora's personal courage and humane treatment of the internees and credited him with protecting the prisoners during the dangerous retreat from Transnistria.

Motora did not continue his pre-war gendarmerie career. He entered civilian employment in the Ministry of Commerce and later received a military pension. He died in Târgu Mureș on 12 December 1970, aged 78.

== Righteous Among the Nations ==
On 3 March 1983, Yad Vashem posthumously recognized Motora as Righteous Among the Nations. His file number in the Yad Vashem Righteous Among the Nations collection is M.31.2/2394. He is commemorated on the Wall of Honor at Yad Vashem, and the institution records that a ceremony was held in his honour.

Yad Vashem credited Motora with doing everything within his power to save Jewish lives, despite the risk that his actions posed to his military career and his own life.

In 1990, after the Romanian Revolution, Israeli ambassador to Romania Zvi Mazel participated in a ceremony at the Israeli Embassy in Bucharest commemorating Motora and presenting his family with the medal associated with the Righteous Among the Nations distinction.

== Legacy ==
Motora's rescue of the Vapniarka prisoners has been discussed in survivor memoirs and historical studies. Former prisoner Ștefan Voicu published an extended recollection of Motora, entitled Un om între oameni ("A Man Among Men"), in România literară in 1978. He subsequently included an account of Motora and the evacuation from Transnistria in his 1980 memoir Vremuri, oameni. Matei Gall's account of the March 1944 evacuation was later reproduced by the Federation of Jewish Communities of Romania.

The Romanian Gendarmerie subsequently commemorated Motora. Under Ministry of Internal Affairs Order No. 678 of 6 June 2005, the Mureș County Gendarmerie Inspectorate was renamed the "Colonel Sabin Motora" Mureș County Gendarmerie Inspectorate, effective 15 June 2005.

Motora is also commemorated at the Holocaust Museum in Odesa, where material concerning him has been displayed in the museum's first exhibition room.

== See also ==
- History of the Jews in Romania
