= Nicolae Glib =

Moldovan folk musician

Nicolae Glib (born 10 May 1949) is a Moldovan folk music singer. He lives in the commune of Pepeni, Sîngerei district, Republic of Moldova.

== Childhood and adolescence ==
Nicolae Glib started his artistic career at the age of 4 when he started dancing in a folk dance assembly. As an adolescent, he fell irrevocably in love with Moldovan folk music by listening to Nicolae Sulac daily. Sulac is one of the most notorious Moldovan folk singers and also the first one to school young Glib in the ways of folk music.

== Education ==
Glib attended courses at the Musical Middle School St. Neaga from 1967 to 1971. Afterwards, he became a student at the Arts Institute G. Musicescu (1975–1980) from Chisinau, Moldova. His choir master during the years at the institute was Alexandru Movila.

== Career ==
Nicolae Glib started off his professional career as a soloist for the Orchestra of the Folk Dancing Ensemble, "Joc", affiliated with the Philharmonic in Chisinau. The Joc Orchestra was at the time directed by Vladimir Rotaru, followed by Vasile Goia. Glib was there from 1969 to 1972.

From 1972 to 1985, he was a soloist in the folk music orchestra entitled "Folklore", affiliated with the Chisinau Radio & Television Society. Later on, he sang in the Philharmonic's Folk Orchestra "The Bards".

It was the most fruitful years of his artistic career while he activated in the "Folklore" Orchestra. During that time, he also recorded his most famous songs: "Moldovan ca mine nu-i" (There's no Moldovan such as myself), "Basmaluta" (Headkerchief), "Doar o viata are omul" (The man has but a life), etc.

In his 13 years of singing for the Radio & Television Orchestra, he left hundreds of songs for the Radio TV Sound Archives. Nowadays, these songs are listened by Romanians from both sides of the Prut. Glib was a part of numerous successful duets. He sang duets with Valentina Cojocaru, Dumitru Blajinu, Ignat Bratu, Serghei Cretu, Sergiu Cuciuc, Nicolae Botgros, Boris Rudenco, etc.

Currently, Nicolae Glib appears on stage mostly accompanied by his son, Isidor Glib. Together, they performed at the Golden Horseshoe Award Ceremony; the ceremony dedicated to The Bards Orchestra 40th anniversary; and also, at the 70th Anniversary ceremony of Radio Iași.

== Awards ==
- In 1980, Glib was awarded the honorific title "Honored Artist of the Republic of Moldova".
- In 1990, he was awarded with the title "the People's Artist"
- In 1993 he won the State Award "Civic Merit"
- In 1996, he was distinguished with the Order "The Glory of Labour"
- In 2010, through a presidential decree, he was distinguished with the "Order of the Republic"

All of the above are significant distinctions in the Republic of Moldova.
