= Sulac =

Sulac is a surname. Notable people with the surname include:

- Doina Sulac (born 1988), Moldovan folk singer
- Nicolae Sulac (1936–2003), Moldovan folk singer, father of Doina

== See also ==
- Sulak (disambiguation)#People
