= Music of Moldova =

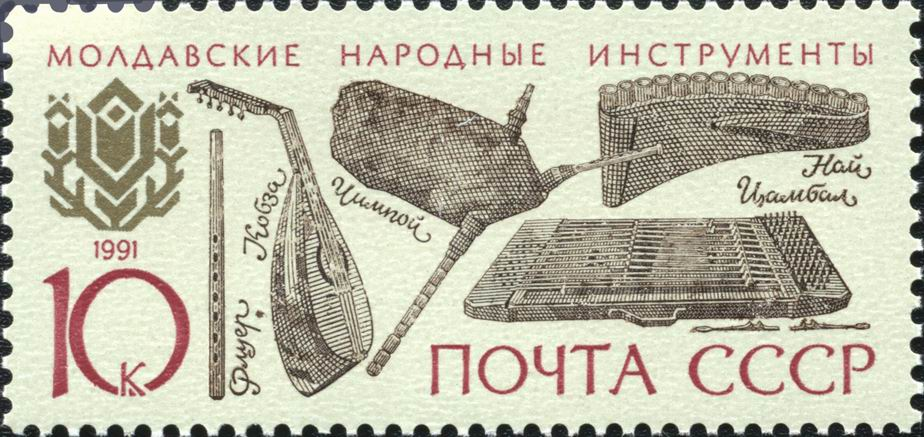
Soviet postage stamp depicting traditional musical instruments of Moldova

Music in Moldova is closely related to that of its neighbour and cultural kin, Romania. Moldovan folk is known for swift, complex rhythms (a characteristic shared with many Eastern European traditions), musical improvisation, syncopation and much melodic ornamentation. Pop, hip hop, rock and other modern genres have their own fans in Moldova as well. Modern pop stars include O-Zone, a Moldovan band whose "Dragostea din tei" was a major 2004 European hit, guitarist and songwriter Vladimir Pogrebniuc, Natalia Barbu, who is well known in Germany, Romania and Ukraine, and Nelly Ciobanu. The band Flacai became well known in the 1970s across Moldova, turning their hometown of Cahul into an important center of music.

== Folk music ==
During the Soviet era, Moldovan folk culture flourished, and was strongly promoted by the government. However, many elements were altered to obscure the shared history of Romania and Moldova, because the Soviet Union wanted to discourage secession.

The Mioriţa is ancient ballad that is a very important part of Moldovan folk culture.

== Popular Moldovan musicians ==
Artists

- Doina and Ion Aldea Teodorovici
- Dan Bălan
- Irina Rimes
- Ana Barbu
- Natalia Barbu
- Maria Bieșu
- Nicolae Botgros
- Isidor Burdin
- Nelly Ciobanu
- Mihai Ciobanu
- Tamara Ciobanu
- Vitalie Dani
- Anatol Dumitraș
- Nicolae Glib
- Zinaida Julea
- Patricia Kopatchinskaja
- Anastasia Lazariuc
- Arkady Luxemburg
- Gândul Mâței
- The Motans
- Gheorghe Murgu
- Andrew Rayel
- Sofia Rotaru
- Radu Sîrbu
- Pavel Stratan
- Cleopatra Stratan
- Nicolae Sulac
- Ion Suruceanu

Groups

- Alternosfera
- Arsenium
- Carla's Dreams
- Delta Pe Obraz
- DoReDos
- Infected Rain
- Noroc
- Orizont
- O-Zone
- SunStroke Project
- Zdob și Zdub

== Musical institutions ==
Moldova's folk music and dance companies, troupes and orchestras are well known, especially Joc, an academic dance company; a joc is a celebration that includes dances, as well as the part of a town where the dancing takes place.

The Orchestra of Moldovan Folk Music and Dance was founded in 1949; the orchestra plays Romanian, Russian, Ukrainian, Polish, German music.

Music festivals in Moldova include The Faces of Friends, held in the town of Cahul; this festival was founded in 1996.

== See also ==
- List of music released by Moldovan artists that has charted in major music markets
- Moldova in the Eurovision Song Contest
