= Flueraș =

Flueraş, Flueraș, Fluerash, or Fluieraş may refer to:

- Ioan Flueraș (1882–1952), Romanian politician
- Fluieraş, a Moldovan folk music ensemble; see Maria Bieșu and Nicolae Sulac
