= Grosulovo internment camp =

Romanian-run internment camp in occupied Ukraine during World War II

Grosulovo
- Internment camp
- Location: Grosulovo, Transnistria Governorate (now Velyka Mykhailivka, Ukraine)
- Operated by: Kingdom of Romania
- Commandant: Sabin Motora
- Original use: Tobacco depot
- Operational: Autumn 1941 – March 1944
- Inmates: Jews, political prisoners and Ukrainian prisoners

The Grosulovo internment camp was a Romanian-administered internment camp at Grosulovo (present-day Velyka Mykhailivka, Odesa Oblast, Ukraine), in the Romanian-occupied Transnistria Governorate during World War II. Established in the autumn of 1941 in a former tobacco depot, it initially held Jews deported from Bessarabia and Bukovina, together with local Ukrainian Jews. Most of these early prisoners were subsequently sent farther east toward the Southern Bug.

The camp acquired a different function in October 1943, when hundreds of predominantly Jewish political prisoners were transferred there following the closure of the Vapniarka concentration camp. Colonel Sabin Motora, the final commandant of Vapniarka, also commanded the prisoners at Grosulovo. Rather than obey orders to move the prisoners eastward for transfer to German custody, Motora arranged for them to be moved to Grosulovo, closer to the Romanian frontier.

In March 1944, as the Red Army advanced through Transnistria, Motora evacuated approximately 600 of the former Vapniarka prisoners westward toward Tiraspol and across the Dniester into Bessarabia. They were subsequently returned to Romania and interned at the Târgu Jiu camp until August 1944. Motora's actions at Vapniarka and Grosulovo led Yad Vashem to recognize him posthumously as Righteous Among the Nations in 1983.

== History ==
=== Jewish community and occupation ===
Grosulovo, now known as Velyka Mykhailivka, was located in the southwestern part of the territory that became Romanian-administered Transnistria, approximately 75 kilometres (47 mi) east of Chișinău. According to the 1939 Soviet census, 727 Jews lived in Grosulovo district, including 522 in Grosulovo itself. Jews constituted 41.5 percent of the settlement's population.

German and Romanian forces occupied Grosulovo on 7 August 1941 during the Axis invasion of the Soviet Union. On 12 August, five days after the occupation, soldiers assembled Jews at the local cemetery and shot 124 of them, including 35 children.

Romanian authorities assumed administrative control of the area in September 1941. The settlement became part of the Transnistria Governorate and its name appeared in Romanian sources as Grosulovo or Grosulova.

=== Establishment of the camp ===
A camp was established at Grosulovo in the autumn of 1941. It occupied a dilapidated former tobacco depot in the centre of the settlement.

The prisoners included Jews deported by Romanian authorities from Bessarabia and Bukovina, as well as local Ukrainian Jews who had survived the killings following the Axis occupation. Most were subsequently transported or marched eastward toward the Southern Bug. A smaller number of skilled workers and specialists were retained for labour in and around Grosulovo.

The number of Jews remaining in detention in the surrounding area declined rapidly. By April 1942, Romanian records listed only 27 Jews—six men, eighteen women and three children—in the camps and ghettos of Tiraspol County.

Among those retained at Grosulovo were accountants David Litman, Moise (Mișu) Bartman and Pavel Cornișteanu. They were assigned to enterprises in the district, including a winery, milk-collection facilities and an egg incubator. Physician Lua Leibovici worked at the local medical centre.

By 1 September 1943, only two Jews deported from Bukovina were recorded as remaining at Grosulovo.

== Transfer of prisoners from Vapniarka ==
=== October 1943 transfer ===
The character of the camp changed substantially in October 1943 following the closure of the Vapniarka concentration camp. Vapniarka had become a detention centre primarily for Jews deported from Romania as political prisoners or alleged political undesirables. The prisoners included communists, social democrats and others classified by the Romanian authorities as political detainees, although many had been deported without specific charges.

Hundreds of Vapniarka prisoners suffered from lathyrism after being fed large quantities of the toxic grass pea Lathyrus sativus. The resulting neurological illness caused weakness and paralysis, and some prisoners were left permanently disabled.

On 14 October 1943, a group of approximately 565 Jewish and non-Jewish prisoners was transferred from Vapniarka to Grosulovo. Approximately 200 Ukrainian prisoners were already being held at Grosulovo and were subsequently transferred elsewhere. Sources give differing totals for the Vapniarka prisoners transferred to Grosulovo, reflecting transfers and changes in the prisoner population.

On 20 October, several dozen additional Jewish deportees were transferred to Grosulovo from the Slivina disciplinary camp.

=== Sabin Motora ===
Colonel Sabin Motora, a career officer in the Romanian Gendarmerie, had become the fourth and final commandant of Vapniarka in May 1943. He subsequently commanded the prisoners transferred to Grosulovo.

As the Red Army advanced toward Transnistria, Motora was ordered to transfer the Vapniarka prisoners eastward, where they were to be handed over to German forces. Instead, he arranged for their evacuation to Grosulovo, which lay closer to the Romanian border.

Yad Vashem later described Motora as having done everything within his power to save Jewish lives despite the danger his actions posed to his own life and military career. His decision to send the prisoners toward Grosulovo rather than surrender them to German custody became central to his later recognition as Righteous Among the Nations.

=== Conditions ===
An infirmary was established after the Vapniarka prisoners arrived at Grosulovo. It was particularly important for prisoners suffering from illnesses and disabilities resulting from the grass-pea diet at Vapniarka.

Conditions were less restrictive than those the political prisoners had experienced at Vapniarka. Religious activities were permitted, and prisoners organized a theatrical performance during the winter of 1943–1944.

Other accounts describe the prisoners as having considerable latitude in organizing their daily lives. They were permitted to operate a canteen, undertake agricultural work outside the camp, obtain additional food and receive parcels and other assistance from relatives and aid organizations.

Despite the improved conditions, the prisoners remained internees under Romanian guard. Their situation became increasingly precarious as Soviet forces approached and German forces began to reoccupy parts of Transnistria; in March 1944, Motora evacuated the remaining prisoners across the Dniester into Bessarabia.

== Evacuation in 1944 ==
=== Soviet advance ===
By early 1944, Soviet forces were advancing westward across Ukraine toward the Southern Bug and Dniester. German and Romanian forces began withdrawing from Transnistria, creating a renewed danger that the Grosulovo prisoners would fall into German custody.

In March 1944, as the evacuation of Transnistria approached, Motora succeeded in moving the prisoners into Bessarabia. Yad Vashem later cited both his earlier decision to move the prisoners from Vapniarka toward Grosulovo and his subsequent efforts to get them across the Dniester as part of his rescue of the group.

=== March toward Tiraspol ===
The prisoners left Grosulovo under Romanian gendarmerie escort and marched toward Tiraspol. Many were physically weakened by imprisonment, malnutrition and disease, while some continued to suffer from disabilities caused by the lathyrism epidemic at Vapniarka.

During the march, the column encountered an armed group described in the USHMM encyclopedia as Soviet deserters fighting on the German side. Motora moved to the head of the column and ordered the Romanian gendarmes to close ranks around the prisoners to protect them from a possible attack.

Former prisoner Matei Gall later gave a detailed account of the evacuation. According to Gall, Motora learned that retreating German forces were preparing to assume control of Tiraspol and that the prisoners were in danger of being handed over to a German guard detachment. He also learned that the bridge across the Dniester between Tiraspol and Tighina was expected to come under German control.

Although the prisoners were exhausted, Motora ordered the column to continue immediately toward the river rather than remain at Tiraspol. The group used secondary agricultural roads in an effort to avoid retreating German troops.

=== Crossing the Dniester ===
The prisoners reached the bridge across the Dniester connecting Tiraspol with Tighina and crossed into Bessarabia under Romanian gendarmerie escort.

According to Gall's account, German military police reached the eastern side of the bridge shortly after the prisoners had crossed. The Federation of Jewish Communities of Romania later described Motora's actions as having saved approximately 600 people from almost certain death.

After crossing the Dniester, the prisoners were temporarily housed in an abandoned cinema near the river. A Romanian military field kitchen and washing facilities were made available, allowing them to wash themselves and their clothing. They remained there for approximately three weeks in quarantine.

=== Transfer to Romania ===
Following the quarantine, Motora arranged for the prisoners to be transported by train into Romania. They passed through Bucharest and were subsequently sent to the political-prisoner camp at Târgu Jiu.

Sources differ concerning the exact size of the group. One Romanian account states that Motora had custody of 611 Jewish prisoners and succeeded in bringing 608 into Romania; the other three reportedly escaped during the rail journey with the complicity of their Romanian guards. Other sources describe the group more generally as numbering approximately 600.

The varying totals reflect different stages in the movement of prisoners through Grosulovo. The USHMM encyclopedia gives figures of approximately 565 prisoners in the principal transfer from Vapniarka on 14 October 1943, while additional prisoners subsequently arrived at Grosulovo and later accounts describe about 600 people during the March 1944 evacuation.

The prisoners sent to Târgu Jiu remained there until the overthrow of the government of Ion Antonescu following the coup of 23 August 1944. Yad Vashem records that the prisoners remained at Târgu Jiu until their liberation in August 1944.

== Aftermath ==
Grosulovo returned to Soviet control during the Red Army's advance in 1944. In 1946, the settlement was renamed Velyka Mykhailivka. It is now part of Rozdilna Raion in Odesa Oblast.

The history of the Grosulovo camp became closely associated with that of Vapniarka because of the October 1943 transfer and the subsequent evacuation of its prisoners. Former prisoner Yehiel Benditer later documented both camps in his 1995 book Vapniarca: lagărele Vapniarca și Grosulovo, închisoarea Rîbnița, ghetourile Olgopol, Savrani, Tridubi, Crivoi-Ozero și Trihati.

Motora's actions at Vapniarka and Grosulovo were subsequently documented in survivor testimony and historical studies. Yad Vashem recognized him posthumously as Righteous Among the Nations in 1983. His case number is 2394. Yad Vashem's account emphasizes his refusal to carry out the order to send the Jewish prisoners eastward to the Germans and his decision instead to move them toward Grosulovo and the Romanian frontier, despite the personal and professional risks involved.

== See also ==
- The Holocaust in Romania
