= Vapniarka =

Rural locality in Vinnytsia Oblast, Ukraine

Vapniarka Вапнярка
- Rural settlement
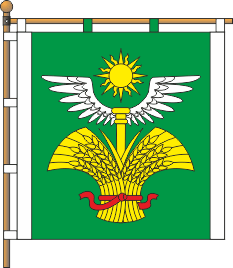
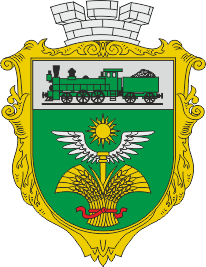
- Flag Coat of arms

- Location in Vinnytsia Oblast Location in Ukraine
- Coordinates: 48°32′N 28°45′E
- Country: Ukraine
- Oblast: Vinnytsia Oblast
- Raion: Tulchyn Raion
- Hromada: Vapniarka territorial communities
- Founded: 1870

Area
  - Total: 13 km^{2} (5.0 sq mi)

Population (2022)
  - Total: 7,165
  - Density: 550/km^{2} (1,400/sq mi)
- Postal code: 24240—244
- Area code: +380 4350

Vapniarka (Ukrainian: Вапнярка), also known as Vapniarca, Vapnyarka, Wapnjarka or Wapniarka, is a rural settlement in Tulchyn Raion, Vinnytsia Oblast, Ukraine. As of January 2022 Vapniarka's population was approximately 7,165.

== Name ==
The settlement's name stems from вапно - the Ukrainian word for lime (gypsum).

== History ==
Located in the historical region of Eastern Podolia, since 1870 Vapniarka has been known as a railroad station. In 1919 it was a site of battles fought by the Ukrainian People's Army and Ukrainian Galician Army against Bolsheviks and Denikin's White Army.

During World War II, following the start of Operation Barbarossa, Vapniarka was administered by Romania. From October 22, 1941, to March 1944, it was included in the region of Transnistria and became the site for a concentration camp for members of the Romanian Jewish community. This succession of events formed a part of The Holocaust in Romania.

Today, Vapniarka serves as the final train destination for visitors traveling to villages in Tomashpilskyi and Yampilskyi Raion of Vinnytsia Oblast. From here, buses or private transportation are used to get to villages like Busha, Dzyhivka, Olhopil, Tomashpil, and Sobolivka.

Until 26 January 2024, Vapniarka was designated urban-type settlement. On this day, a new law entered into force which abolished this status, and Vapniarka became a rural settlement.

=== World War II camp ===
In October 1941, the Romanians established a detention camp in Vapniarka. (By that time, the 700 local Jewish inhabitants had fled or had been killed by the Nazi German or Romanian troops.) One thousand Jews were brought to the site that month, mostly from the city of Odessa. Some 200 died in a typhus epidemic; the others were taken out of the camp in two batches, guarded by soldiers of the Romanian Gendarmerie, and shot to death. In early 1942, a few hundred Jews originally from Odessa were sent to Vapniarka. Many of them died; a Jew originally from Odessa died in Vapniarka in September 1942.

In 1942, 150 Jews from Bukovina were brought to Vapniarka; they included some refugees from Poland. On September 16 of that year, 1023 Jews from the Old Kingdom of Romania and southern Transylvania were also brought to the camp. About half had been banished from their homes on suspicion of being communists, but 554 had been included without any specific charges being brought against them. By keeping the camp meticulously clean, the prisoners were able to overcome the typhus epidemic, but they suffered from the poor quality of the food, which included Lathyrus sativus, a species of pea that was normally used to feed livestock, and barley bread that had a 20% straw content. A team of doctors among the inmates, led by Dr. Arthur Kessler of Cernăuţi, reached the conclusion that the disease presented all the symptoms of lathyrism, a spastic paralysis caused by the oxalyldiaminopropionic acid present in the pea fodder. Within a few weeks, the first symptoms of the disease appeared, affecting the bone marrow of prisoners and causing paralysis. By January 1943, hundreds of prisoners were suffering from lathyrism. The inmates declared a hunger strike and demanded medical assistance. As a result, the authorities allowed the Jewish Aid Committee in Bucharest to supply them with medicine, and the prisoners' relatives were allowed to send them parcels. It was only at the end of January that the prisoners were no longer fed with the animal fodder that had caused the disease, but 117 Jews were paralyzed for life.

In March 1943, it was found that 427 Jews had been imprisoned for no reason whatsoever. They were moved to various ghettos in Transnistria, but were sent back to Romania and released only in December 1943–January 1944. In October 1943, when the Soviet Red Army was approaching the region, it was decided to liquidate the camp. 80 Jews were sent to ghettos in Transnistria. 54 communists were taken to a prison in Rîbnița, Transnistria, where they were killed in their cells by SS men on March 19, 1944. A third group, which included most of the prisoners (565 persons), was moved to Romania in March 1944 and imprisoned in the camp for political prisoners in Târgu Jiu, until after the fall of the Antonescu government in August. According to the Yad Vashem database, the number of Jews who lived in Vapniarka whose names are available, including the deportees, who died in the Holocaust was 92. For more information on the Holocaust in Transnistria, including on the fate of the Jewish deportees from Romania, see History of the Jews in Transnistria.

== Economy ==
Vapniarka is an important railway hub, known as a site of cereal production.
