= Vladimir Curbet =

Moldovan choreographer (1930–2017)

Vladimir Curbet OR PAU
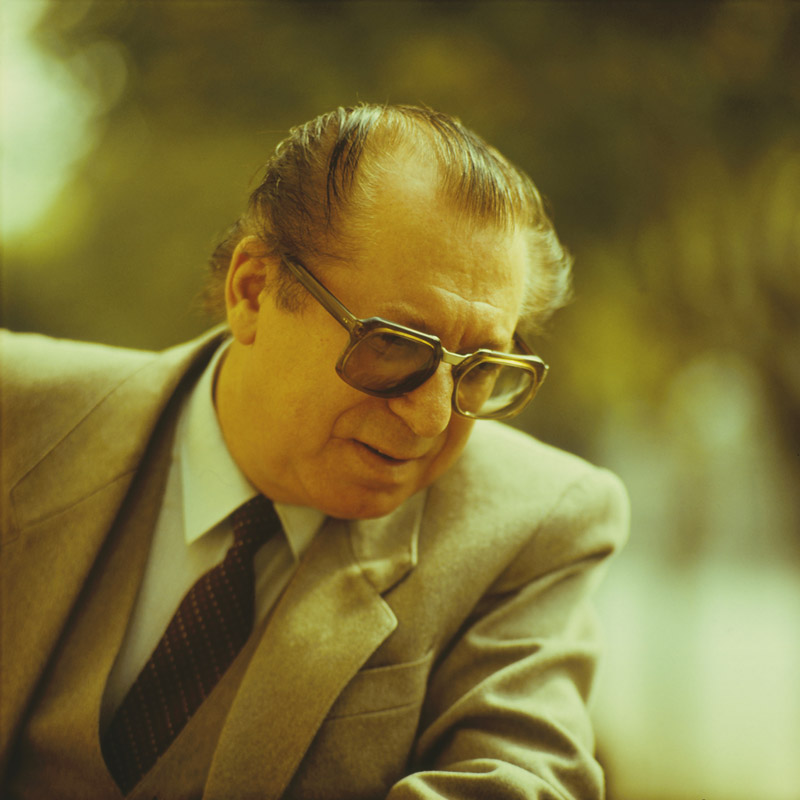
- Curbet in 1980
- Born: 5 December 1930; Susleni, Romania
- Died: 8 December 2017 (aged 87); Chișinău, Moldova
- Occupation: Choreographer

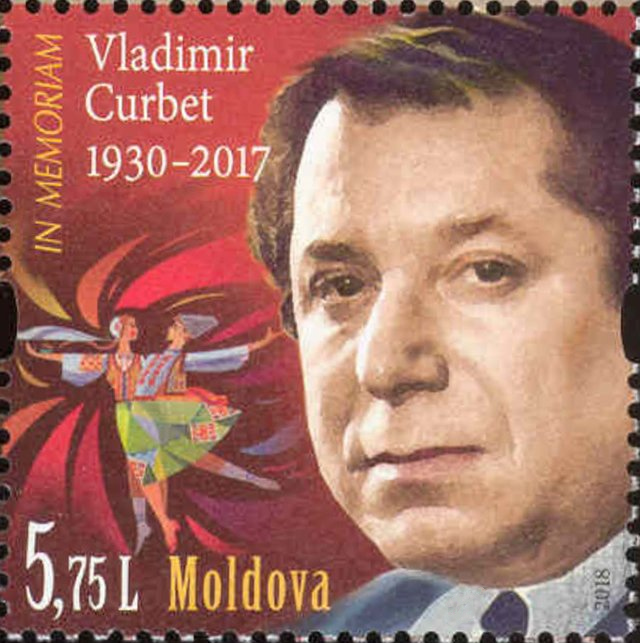
Curbet on a 2018 stamp of Moldova

Vladimir Curbet (5 December 1930 – 8 December 2017) was a Moldovan choreographer. From 1957 until his death in late 2017 he was the 13th director of the Moldovan national folk dance ensemble Joc.

Curbet died on 8 December 2017, 3 days after his 87th birthday. He was buried on 13 December 2017 in the Chișinău Central Cemetery.

== Awards and recognition ==
- People's Artist of the Moldavian SSR (1967)
- USSR State Prize (1972)
- Order of Friendship of Peoples (1980)
- People's Artist of the USSR (1981)
- Order of the Red Banner of Labour (twice)
- Order of the Republic (Moldova) (1992)
- Moldova State Prize (2012)
- Order of the Bogdan The Founder
- Honorary citizen of Chișinău (2014)
