= Doina Sulac =

- Born: 11 July 1988 (age 37); Chișinău, Moldavian SSR, Soviet Union
- Genres: Folk
- Occupations: Singer; songwriter

Doina Sulac (born 11 July 1988) is a folk singer and songwriter from Moldova.

== Early life ==
Sulac was born on 11 July 1988 in Chișinău, the daughter of Nicolae Sulac.

== Life and career ==
Sulac debuted on stage at the age of four, when, during an evening created by her father, she performed Angela Moldovan's song, "Mi-am cusut bondița nouva", accompanied by the Orchestra Lăutarii. At the age of 13, she released her first album.

Sulac got married at 16, still a high school student. It was also then that she gave birth to a daughter named Nicoleta. Shortly after the marriage, she divorced her husband, violinist Ion Cipilencu. At 18, Sulac became a municipal councilor on the lists of the Liberal Party within the Chișinău Municipal Council. She had given birth to a son on 27 March 2023.

Sulac's godfather is conductor Nicolae Botgros, leader of the Orchestra Lăutarii.

== Discography ==
- Mohor (2008)
