= Sadîc =

- Commune
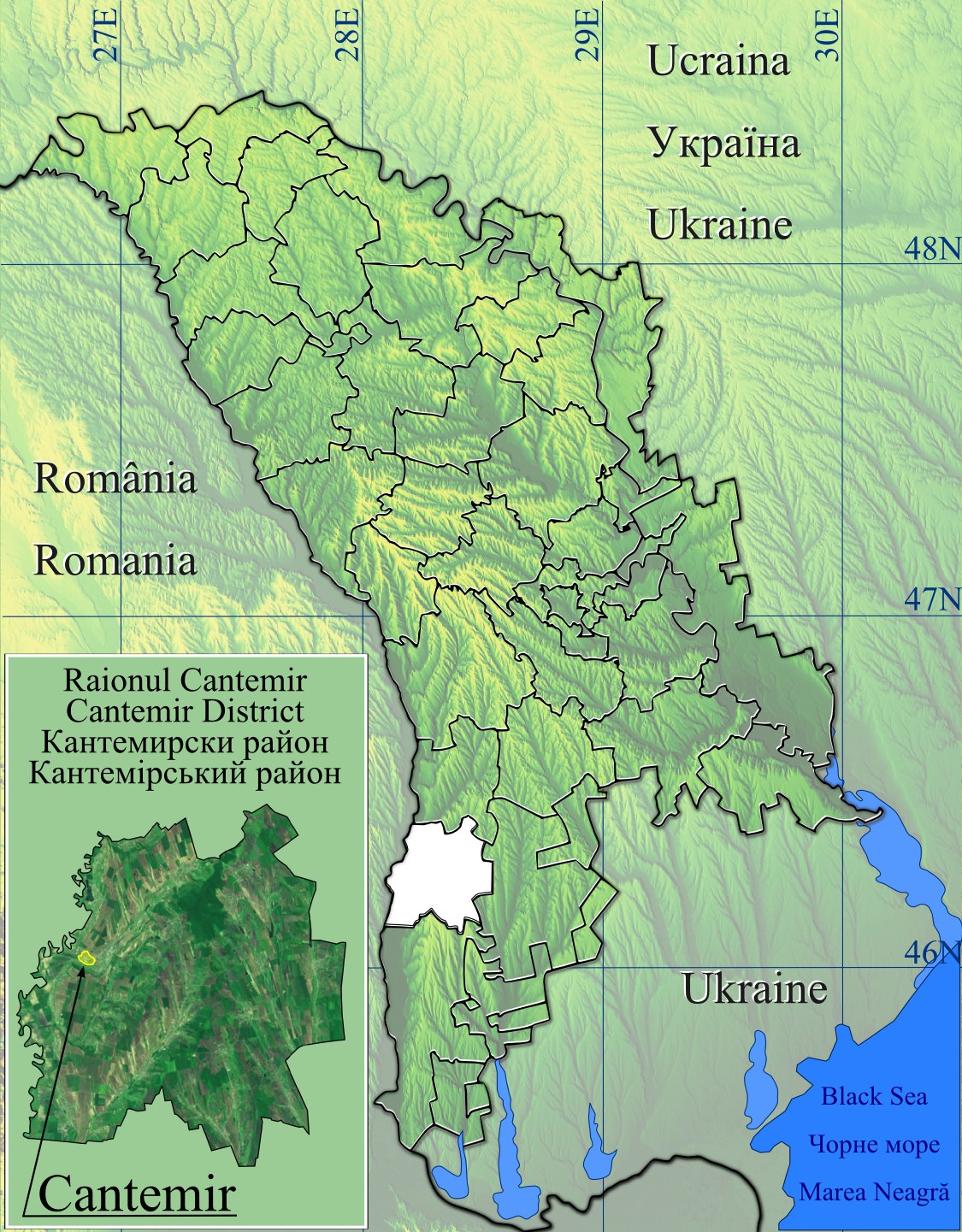
- Location within Cantemir
- Coordinates: 46°16′14″N 28°31′1″E
- Country: Moldova
- District: Sadîc

Government
  - Mayor: Șompol Ion, PSL
- Elevation: 75 m (246 ft)

Population (2014)
  - Total: 2,033
- Time zone: UTC+2 (EET)
  - Summer (DST): UTC+3 (EEST)
- Postal code: MD-7331

Sadîc is a commune in Cantemir District, Moldova. It is composed of two villages, Sadîc and Taraclia.
