= Pinhas Zaltzman =

Rabbi and Dayan in Moldova

Rabbi Pinhas Zaltzman פנחס זלצמן
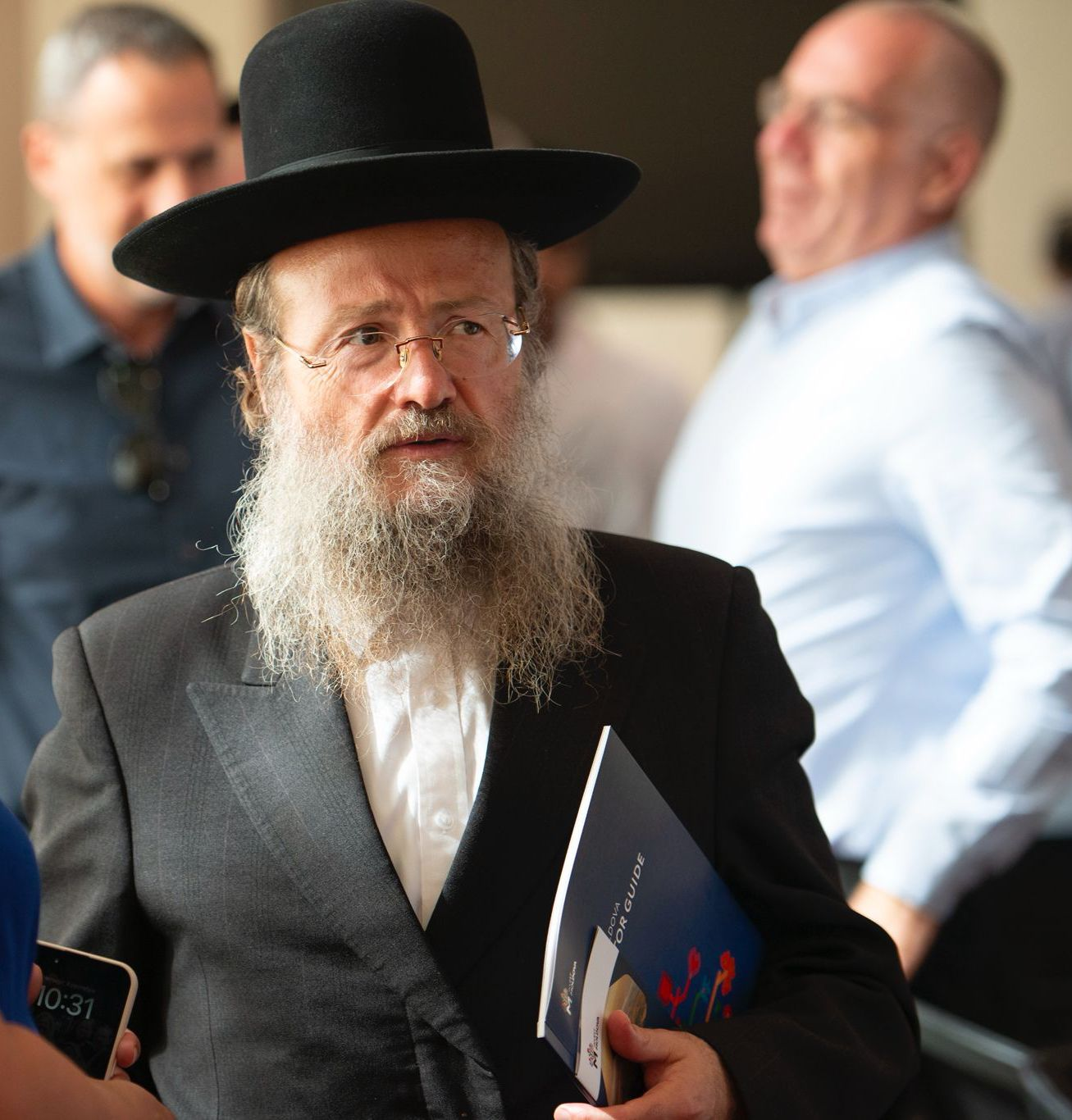

Personal life
- Born: June 12, 1970 Tel Aviv, Israel
- Children: 10
- Occupation: Rabbi and dayan

Religious life
- Religion: Judaism

Rabbi Pinhas Zaltzman (Romanian: Pinhas Zalțman) is a rabbi and dayan in Moldova.

== Early life ==
On his mother's side, Rabbi Zaltzman descends from a distinguished rabbinic lineage – his maternal grandfather served as a rabbi in Chișinău before immigrating to the Land of Israel in 1920. His father's family is of Polish-Jewish origin.

He was born in Tel Aviv to Rabbi Shimon Yosef Zaltzman, Deputy Director-General of Chinuch Atzmai and Chairman of the Horev school network, and to Bracha Malka Rabinowitz, daughter of Rabbi Levi Rabinowitz, author of the Ma’adanei HaShulchan series. He is also a grandson of Rabbi Gamliel Rabinowitz, who served as head of the Chișinău Yeshiva.

Rabbi Zaltzman studied at the Karlin Yeshiva, the Tchebin Yeshiva, and the Tifrach Yeshiva. He later continued his Torah studies at the Kollel of Rabbi Shmuel Auerbach, with whom he studied chavrusa for several years. Subsequently, he studied for three years in a Kollel for rabbinic studies while serving as the rabbi of the town of Oranit, where he also established a mikveh.

He later joined the "Halichot Olam" Kollel led by Rabbi Ratzon Arusi in Kiryat Ono, specializing in the Magen HaElef judicial track, and received rabbinical court certification under Rabbi Arusi's supervision. He also studied under Rabbi Chaim Kreiswirth and was a close disciple and attendant of his grandfather, Rabbi Rabinowitz.

Rabbi Zaltzman is a close disciple of Rabbi Shmuel Eliezer Stern and serves as a rabbinical judge on his rabbinical court, as well as on the European Rabbinical Court headed by Rabbi Yosef Hanoch Brodbecker. This court provides rabbinic and halachic services to Jewish communities across Central and Eastern Europe and the former Soviet republics.

=== Public and communal activities ===
During the establishment of Ramat Beit Shemesh, when Minister Binyamin Ben-Eliezer opposed the creation of Haredi neighborhoods, Rabbi Zaltzman worked together with Rabbis Chaim Nachum Freiman and Nissen Zweibel to promote their development. Their efforts led to the construction of several neighborhoods comprising hundreds of housing units designated for the Haredi community.

Later, during the founding of Elad, he participated in the campaign to establish the city, working in cooperation with Rabbi Shlomo Zalman Grossman, then chairman of the Menucha VeNachala association, and contributed to the development of several neighborhoods.

He subsequently promoted the "Or Sameach" project in Modi’in Illit, encompassing 560 dunams, and served as a co-owner of Neot HaPisga, a company that built approximately 1,000 housing units in Modi’in Illit.

Rabbi Zaltzman currently serves as chairman of Urbanitop, a real estate firm active in dozens of projects across Israel, including in Jerusalem, Tel Aviv, Bnei Brak, Rehovot, Rishon LeZion, and Modi’in Illit.

== Activities in Moldova ==
In 2008, Rabbi Zaltzman arrived in Chișinău, Moldova, initially on a business visit, but soon began extensive community work assisting local Jews. He opened a synagogue on Bucharest Street and later redeemed the historic Hay synagogue site originally built in the 1980s by the "Committee for the Rescue of the Dispersed of Israel."

In 2014, the Agudat Israel community took residence in the synagogue, which now serves both local Jews and Israelis living or working in Moldova, as well as travelers en route to Uman, Rashkov, Medzhybizh and other important places for pilgrims in the region. The community operates a synagogue, mikveh, adult learning programs, a soup kitchen, an afternoon school, Torah classes, a women's association, a kosher grocery store, provides welfare support for the needy families, and hosts various Jewish events throughout Moldova.

Rabbi Zaltzman is also active in preserving the memory of the 1903 Kishinev Pogrom and the Holocaust through commemorations and educational initiatives combating antisemitism.

He works closely with the American Jewish Joint Distribution Committee (AJJDC), Hillel International, and other Jewish organizations operating in Moldova and Eastern Europe, and assists the Jewish community in Transnistria and its leader, Yuri Kreitchman, in organizing Jewish activities and events.

=== Humanitarian work during the russia-ukraine war ===
Ahead of the outbreak of the Russia–Ukraine war in 2022, Rabbi Zaltzman prepared logistics including over 10 hotels and volunteer teams. When the fighting began, his organization emerged as the leading Jewish relief group, deploying volunteers at border crossings and hotels in Chișinău. The organization operated four kitchens running around the clock and coordinated hundreds of volunteers in rotating shifts.

When the conflict's impact reached Moldova, causing widespread power outages, Rabbi Zaltzman arranged assistance for the elderly and sick, providing heating, medical care, and hospital evacuations. In total over 30,000 of refugees were hosted, transferred, got material and logistics assistance. In recognition, Agudath Israel in Moldova received letters of gratitude from the President of Moldova and the mayor of Chișinău.

=== Diplomatic relations ===
Rabbi Zaltzman and headed by him organization maintains relations with the Embassies of the Germany, Japan, Italy, Lithuania, Sweden, Ukraine, USA and other countries.

In March 2022, Rabbi Zaltzman met with Ukrainian Ambassador to Moldova Marko Shevchenko to coordinate refugee evacuation efforts. The following month, he met with the separatist de facto leader of the Transnistrian region Vadim Krasnoselsky amid concerns over the possible spread of the war to the region.

In April 2023, he was formally received by Moldovan Parliament Speaker Igor Grosu in recognition of his humanitarian efforts on behalf of refugees.

In August 2025, Rabbi Zaltzman met with Moldovan Prime Minister Dorin Recean to discuss combating antisemitism and strengthening the government's support for Moldova's Jewish community.

He also maintains a cooperative relationship with Chișinău Mayor Ion Ceban, in April 2025, the two jointly presented a certificate of appreciation to Israeli Foreign Minister Gideon Sa’ar.

=== Assistance to uman pilgrims ===
In 2023, Rabbi Zaltzman assumed responsibility for coordinating the annual journeys of Breslov Hasidim traveling to Uman via Moldova, in cooperation with the Israeli government and Minister Meir Porush. Over the years, he has provided assistance in arranging accommodations, meals, security, and spiritual guidance for these pilgrims.

He also facilitates visits to other Jewish heritage sites across Moldova. In 2022, he led efforts to make the gravesite of Rabbi Shabtai of Rashkov accessible to visitors.

== Personal life ==
Rabbi Zaltzman is married to Zehava (née Spitzer). The couple has ten children and several dozens grandchildren.
