= Vapniarka concentration camp =

Romanian-run concentration camp in occupied Ukraine during World War II

Vapniarka
- Concentration camp
- Coordinates: 48°32′05″N 28°44′36″E
- Location: Vapniarka, Transnistria Governorate
- Operated by: Kingdom of Romania
- Commandant: Ion Murgescu; Sever Burădescu; Hristache Popovici; Sabin Motora
- Original use: Soviet military school
- Operational: October 1941 – October 1943
- Inmates: Primarily Jews and political prisoners

The Vapniarka concentration camp was a Romanian-administered concentration camp at Vapniarka, in present-day Vinnytsia Oblast, Ukraine. It operated in the Romanian-occupied Transnistria Governorate during the Second World War. The camp was initially used for Jews deported from Odessa and later became a detention centre primarily for Jewish political prisoners deported from Romania.

Vapniarka became particularly notorious for an outbreak of lathyrism among its prisoners after Romanian authorities fed them large quantities of Lathyrus sativus, a toxic pea ordinarily used as animal fodder. Hundreds developed symptoms of neurological disease and 117 prisoners were reported to have been left permanently paralysed.

In 1943, the camp's final commandant, Colonel Sabin Motora, improved conditions for the prisoners. When Vapniarka was closed later that year, Motora defied orders to transfer the prisoners eastward, where they would have fallen into German hands, and instead moved most of them to Grosulovo (present-day Velyka Mykhailivka, Ukraine), closer to the Romanian border.

In March 1944, as Soviet forces advanced through Transnistria, Motora evacuated approximately 600 of the former Vapniarka prisoners from Grosulovo across the Dniester into Bessarabia and subsequently returned them to Romania. They were interned at the Târgu Jiu camp until August 1944. Motora was posthumously recognized by Yad Vashem as Righteous Among the Nations in 1983 for his efforts to save the prisoners.

== History ==
=== Establishment and first prisoners ===
Soon after Romania, under the leadership of Ion Antonescu, joined the war on the Axis side and participated in the invasion of the Soviet Union, Romanian administration was extended across the Dniester into territory previously forming part of the Ukrainian SSR. By that time, Vapniarka's approximately 700 Jewish inhabitants had either fled or been killed by German or Romanian forces.

In October 1941, the Romanian authorities established a detention camp at Vapniarka in a former Soviet military school. About 1,000 Jews were brought there that month, most of them from Odessa. Many were Bessarabian Jews who had fled into Soviet territory before the Romanian and German advance.

Approximately 200 prisoners died during a typhus epidemic. The surviving prisoners were subsequently removed from the camp in two groups under guard by the Romanian Gendarmerie and shot.

In early 1942, several hundred Jews originally from Odessa were again sent to Vapniarka.

=== Political prisoners ===
During 1942 the function of the camp changed. Some 150 Jews from Bukovina, including refugees from Poland, were transported there.

On 16 September 1942, another large transport of Jewish prisoners arrived from the Old Kingdom and southern Transylvania. Sources differ slightly on the number transported, with figures of 1,023 and 1,046 appearing in accounts of the camp. About half had been deported on suspicion of communist activity, while 554 had been detained without specific charges.

The camp was subsequently designated a concentration camp for political prisoners and placed under the direct authority of Romanian Interior Minister Dumitru I. Popescu. In practice, almost all of the political detainees were Jewish. The only other prisoners mentioned in contemporary accounts were Ukrainian prisoners convicted of ordinary criminal offences.

At one stage there were 1,179 Jewish prisoners in the camp, of whom 107 were women. The women were housed separately from the male prisoners.

Among the Jewish prisoners were approximately 130 members of the Romanian Communist Party, about 200 Social Democrats, as well as Trotskyists and Zionists. Many others had been arrested arbitrarily and had no established political affiliation.

Prisoners organized a camp committee that attempted to maintain discipline, distribute the limited supplies available and improve their chances of survival despite starvation, disease, forced labour and abuse. Alongside the recognized camp committee was a clandestine political leadership which encouraged prisoners to maintain collective discipline.

=== Camp conditions ===
The camp had several successive commandants during its period as a detention centre for political prisoners. By September 1942 the commandant was Ion Murgescu, the father of future economist Costin Murgescu. Murgescu was described by former prisoner Egon Balas as having "strong pro-Nazi sympathies". He imposed severe restrictions on the prisoners' water supply.

Murgescu was succeeded by Captain Sever Burădescu, whose tenure was also remembered by former prisoners as particularly harsh. In February 1943 Colonel Hristache Popovici became commandant and relaxed some of the restrictions imposed by his predecessors, including restoring bread rations and permitting prisoners to receive parcels from their families. Popovici was subsequently succeeded by Colonel Sabin Motora, who became the camp's final commandant in May 1943.

=== Lathyrism epidemic ===
Within weeks, prisoners began developing stiffness, weakness of the legs and eventually paralysis. Doctors imprisoned in the camp, led by Dr. Arthur Kessler of Cernăuți, investigated the outbreak and concluded that the prisoners were suffering from lathyrism.

The disease is caused by prolonged consumption of grass pea containing the neurotoxin oxalyldiaminopropionic acid. By January 1943, hundreds of Vapniarka prisoners showed symptoms.

The prisoners organized a hunger strike and demanded medical assistance and a change in their diet. Following the protest, Romanian authorities permitted the Jewish Aid Committee in Bucharest to send medicines to the camp and allowed relatives to send parcels.

The grass pea ration was finally discontinued toward the end of January 1943. Nevertheless, 117 prisoners were reported to have been permanently paralysed.

The epidemic at Vapniarka subsequently became a notable medical case in the study of neurolathyrism. Kessler survived the camp and later wrote an account of his experiences and of the prisoners' identification of the disease.

=== Sabin Motora ===
In May 1943, Colonel Sabin Motora, a career officer in the Romanian Gendarmerie who had previously commanded the internment camp at Caracal, became the fourth and final commandant of Vapniarka.

Conditions became less restrictive under Motora. Prisoners were permitted to organize a canteen and conduct cultural and religious activities, while survivors recalled an improvement in their treatment by Romanian gendarmes and officers.

Motora's tenure later became particularly significant because of his actions during the evacuation of the camp. Yad Vashem states that, although he was ordered to transfer the prisoners eastward to the Germans, he instead took measures to move them to Grosulovo, closer to the Romanian border. According to Yad Vashem, Motora acted to save Jewish lives despite the danger this posed to his military career and his own life.

=== Release of prisoners ===
In March 1943, Romanian authorities determined that 427 Jewish prisoners had been detained without sufficient grounds. They were transferred to several ghettos elsewhere in Transnistria and eventually returned to Romania, where they were released between December 1943 and January 1944.

As the military situation deteriorated for the Axis, Romanian authorities prepared to close Vapniarka. The remaining prisoners faced the possibility of being transferred farther east into territory controlled by German forces.

=== Closure and transfer to Grosulovo ===
By October 1943, as the Red Army advanced toward Transnistria, Romanian authorities decided to close Vapniarka.

Motora received orders to transfer the prisoners eastward so that they could be handed over to German forces. Instead, he moved most of the remaining prisoners in the opposite direction, to Grosulovo (present-day Velyka Mykhailivka, Ukraine), closer to the Romanian border. Yad Vashem subsequently cited this defiance of orders as a central element of Motora's rescue of the prisoners.

Motora accompanied the prisoners and continued as their commandant at Grosulovo. Several prisoners from the Slivina camp were also transferred there.

Conditions at Grosulovo were considerably less restrictive than those that had prevailed at Vapniarka. Prisoners were permitted to organize their own canteen, work in agriculture outside the camp, obtain additional food from outside sources, organize cultural activities, and receive parcels and assistance from relatives and humanitarian organizations.

Not all of the Vapniarka prisoners accompanied the main group to Grosulovo. Eighty Jewish prisoners were transferred to ghettos elsewhere in Transnistria. Fifty-four Communist prisoners were sent to the prison at Rîbnița. On 19 March 1944, they were killed in their cells by German SS personnel during the Rîbnița massacre.

=== Evacuation from Grosulovo ===
By March 1944, the Soviet advance under Marshal Rodion Malinovsky was forcing German and Romanian forces to withdraw from Transnistria. Motora was then responsible for approximately 600 former Vapniarka prisoners at Grosulovo and was instructed to return them to the political-prisoner camp at Târgu Jiu.

The prisoners left Grosulovo on foot for Tiraspol. Many were elderly, ill, disabled or weakened by imprisonment and by the effects of the lathyrism epidemic.

According to former prisoner Matei Gall, during the march Motora learned that retreating German forces were about to assume control of Tiraspol and had demanded that the prisoners be surrendered to a German guard detachment. He also learned that the bridge across the Dniester between Tiraspol and Tighina was expected to come under German control that night.

Although the prisoners were exhausted, Motora ordered the column to continue immediately toward the Dniester. The group travelled along secondary agricultural roads in an effort to avoid retreating German troops. They reached the Tiraspol–Tighina bridge and crossed into Bessarabia. German military police reportedly reached the eastern end of the bridge shortly afterwards.

After crossing the Dniester, Motora temporarily housed the prisoners in an abandoned cinema near the river. A military field kitchen and washing facilities were made available, allowing the prisoners to wash themselves and their clothes. They remained there for approximately three weeks in quarantine.

Motora's actions formed part of the conduct for which Yad Vashem later recognized him as Righteous Among the Nations. Yad Vashem states that he did everything within his power to save the Jewish prisoners, despite risking his military career and his life.

=== Return to Romania ===
Following the quarantine, Motora arranged for the prisoners to be transported by train into Romania. They reached Bucharest and were subsequently transferred to the Târgu Jiu camp.

Accounts differ slightly concerning the size of the group. One account states that Motora was responsible for 611 Jewish prisoners and succeeded in bringing 608 into Romania. The other three escaped during the journey with the complicity of the guards responsible for the train. Other accounts describe the group more generally as numbering approximately 600.

The prisoners remained at Târgu Jiu until the overthrow of the Antonescu government following the 23 August 1944 coup.

Yad Vashem posthumously recognized Motora as Righteous Among the Nations in 1983. His case was numbered 2394. The institution cited his decision to move the prisoners toward the Romanian frontier rather than surrender them to German forces and his efforts to save Jewish lives despite the personal and professional risks involved.

== Prisoner testimony ==
Accounts by former prisoners provide additional descriptions of everyday life at Vapniarka. Among those published by Holocaust historian Boris Zabarko are the recollections of Tamara Zhura-Stelmakh and Ada Vorontsova, both of whom were children when they were imprisoned.

=== Tamara Zhura-Stelmakh ===
Tamara Zhura-Stelmakh was born in Kyiv in 1934. Her family had been transferred to Chernivtsi before the German–Romanian invasion of the Soviet Union. After Romanian forces occupied the city, her father was arrested by the Romanian security authorities and accused of being a Soviet spy. Zhura-Stelmakh, her mother and her two younger brothers were later arrested as well.

According to her recollections, the prisoners were transported to Vapniarka in overcrowded freight cars. After arriving at the railway station, adults were formed into a column for the approximately four-kilometre journey to the camp, while several young children were initially separated from them and later transported to the camp by cart.

Zhura-Stelmakh remembered the camp as being surrounded by three rows of barbed wire with guards stationed at intervals. She recalled three two-storey buildings, two principally occupied by Jewish prisoners and another containing Ukrainians, Russians and some Jews who had arrived with her group. Prisoners were crowded into rooms holding approximately 30 to 40 people and slept on the floor.

She also recalled the extreme shortage of food: a single loaf of bread could be divided among an entire room of prisoners, while soup containing peas formed a major part of the diet. She remembered Jewish and non-Jewish children playing together within the camp and being cared for by older prisoners.

Zhura-Stelmakh stated that during 1943 most of the Jewish prisoners disappeared from the section of the camp in which she was held. In the autumn of that year, she and other remaining Ukrainian, Russian and Jewish prisoners were transferred to Golta, now part of Pervomaisk.

=== Ada Vorontsova ===
Ada Vorontsova, née Kravtsova, was also born in 1934. She was living in Chernivtsi with her grandmother when they were arrested by the Romanian occupation authorities in autumn 1942. Vorontsova recalled spending 42 days in the city's central prison before she and the other detainees were loaded into freight cars and transported to Vapniarka.

Her testimony describes several hundred people arriving at the camp, most of them Jews but also Ukrainians, Poles, Russians, Roma and others. Like Zhura-Stelmakh, she remembered young children being separated temporarily from their mothers on arrival and then transported to the camp in carts.

Vorontsova described several two- or three-storey barrack buildings standing in an otherwise open area, surrounded by three rows of barbed wire, guard towers and dogs. Inside, prisoners slept on bare wooden bunks and received pea-based soup twice a day.

She recalled adult prisoners being marched substantial distances from the camp to perform forced labour, including clearing bomb damage, unloading railway cars, digging trenches and loading grain from elevators onto trains. Children were sometimes assigned lighter labour, such as cleaning warehouses and uncovering storage pits.

Vorontsova later recalled being transferred from Vapniarka to a labour camp or ghetto at Pervomaisk.

The testimonies differ in some details from accounts focused specifically on the Jewish political-prisoner section of Vapniarka, suggesting that the camp complex and its prisoner population changed over time. They also document the presence of some non-Jewish civilian prisoners and children, a group that receives relatively little attention in accounts concentrating on the political prisoners deported from Romania.

== Aftermath and former prisoners ==
Many former Vapniarka prisoners subsequently became politically active in postwar Romania. Several held senior positions after the establishment of Communist Romania. Among them was Simion Bughici, who served as Romania's minister of foreign affairs from 1952 to 1955.

The long-term consequences of the lathyrism epidemic continued after the war. Survivors suffering permanent neurological disabilities sought recognition and compensation for illnesses resulting from their imprisonment.

The precise number of people who passed through Vapniarka over the course of its different phases is difficult to establish because prisoner groups were repeatedly transferred into and out of the camp. Holocaust historian Julius S. Fisher gave a figure of 1,656 survivors associated with Vapniarka.

The survival of many of the camp's remaining Jewish political prisoners was connected to Motora's decision in 1943 to move them toward Grosulovo rather than eastward into German hands. Yad Vashem later described him as having done everything he could to save Jewish lives and recognized him as Righteous Among the Nations.

Several members of the camp administration were prosecuted after the war. Former commandants Ion Murgescu and Sever Burădescu were defendants before the Romanian People's Tribunal in 1945 in proceedings concerning crimes committed in Transnistria, including the treatment of prisoners at Vapniarka. Murgescu was initially sentenced to death; his sentence was commuted on 1 June 1945 to life imprisonment with hard labour.

Burădescu was also convicted of war crimes for his administration of Vapniarka; members of his family submitted a petition for clemency to King Michael in June 1945.

== See also ==
- History of the Jews in Bessarabia
- History of the Jews in Bukovina
- History of the Jews in Transnistria
- Pechora concentration camp
- Târgu Jiu camp
