= Velyka Mykhailivka =

Rural locality in Odesa Oblast, Ukraine

Velyka Mykhailivka Вели́ка Миха́йлівка
- Rural settlement
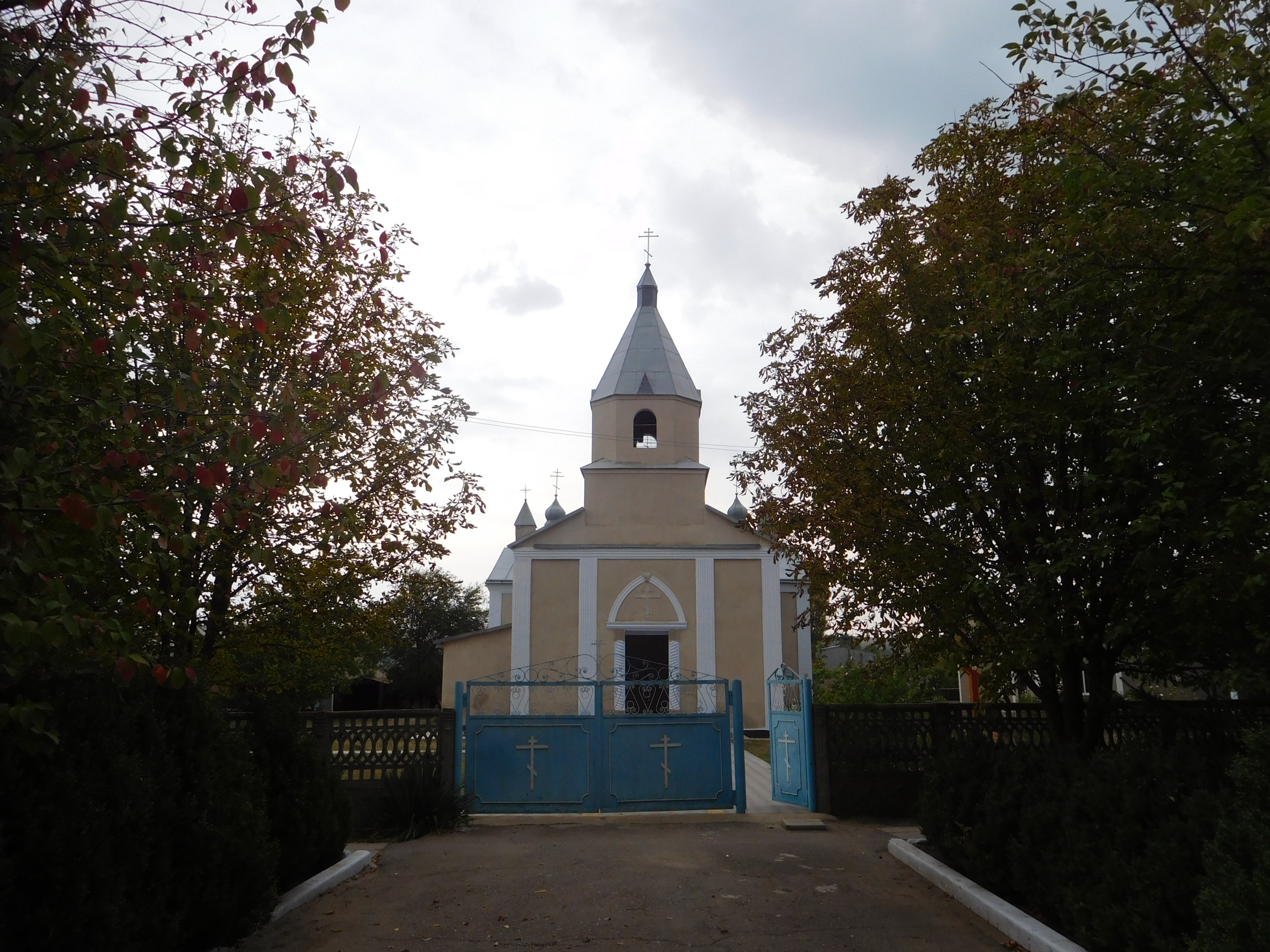
- Interactive map of Velyka Mykhailivka
- Location within Odesa Oblast Location within Ukraine
- Coordinates: 47°4′44″N 29°51′14″E
- Country: Ukraine
- Oblast: Odesa Oblast
- Raion: Rozdilna Raion
- Hromada: Velyka Mykhailivka settlement hromada

Population (2022)
  - Total: 5,303
- Time zone: UTC+2 (EET)
  - Summer (DST): UTC+3 (EEST)

Velyka Mykhailivka (Ukrainian: Вели́ка Миха́йлівка, Velýka Mychájlivka, Russian: Вели́кая Миха́йловка; formerly (until 1945): Гросулово, Grosulovo, Hrosulove, or Grosolova) is a rural settlement in Rozdilna Raion in the west of Odesa Oblast, Ukraine. It hosts the administration of Velyka Mykhailivka settlement hromada, one of the hromadas of Ukraine. Velyka Mykhailivka previously served as the administrative center of Velyka Mykhailivka Raion. Population: 5,303 (2022 estimate)

Velyka Mykhailivka is located on the banks of the Kuchurhan River.

== History ==
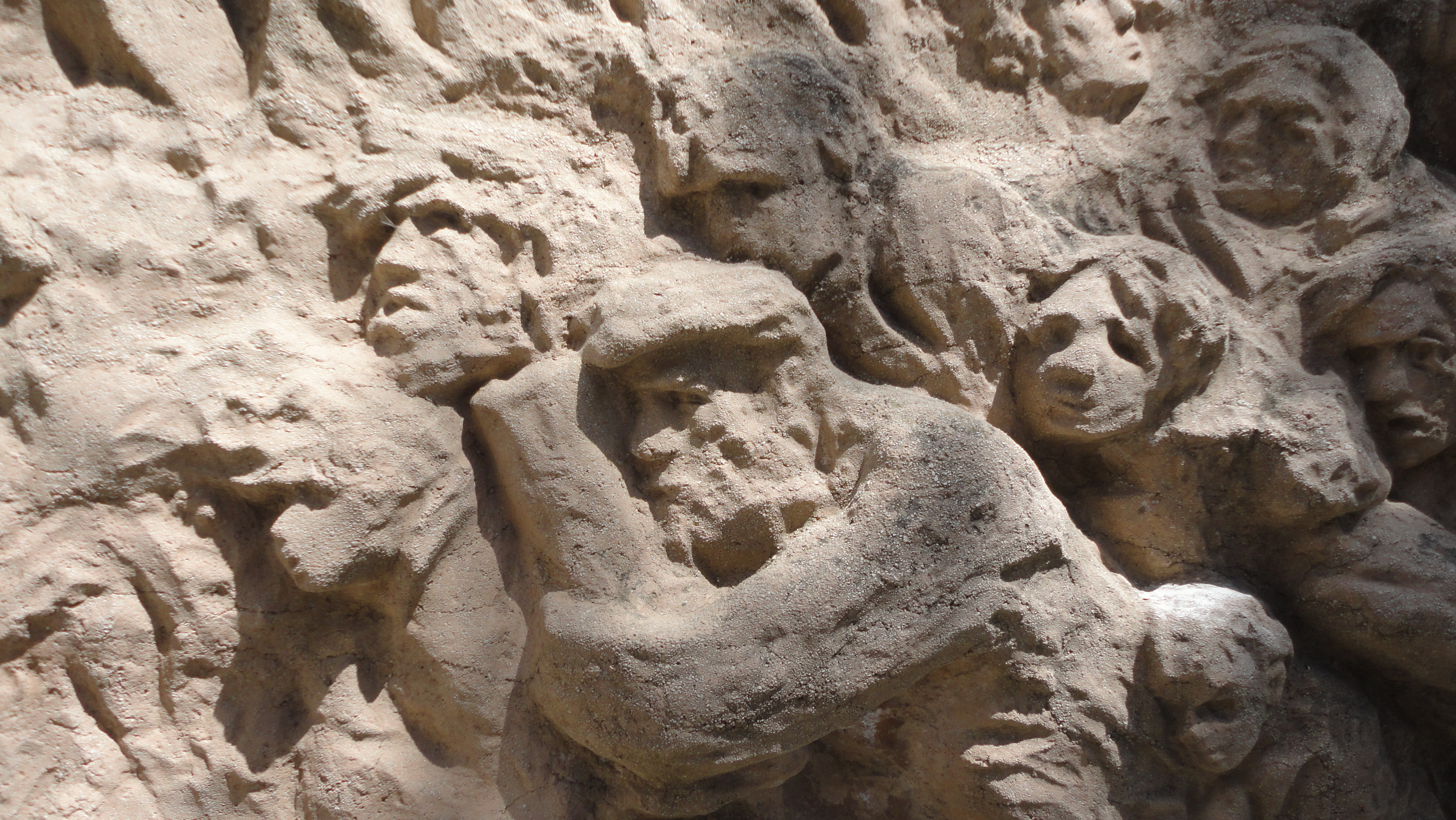
Relief by Batia Lishansky in Memory of the 1919 Pogrom of the Jewish inhabitants, located at Givatayim, Israel.

Velyka Mykhailivka developed as a merger of several localities. Two biggest ones were the selos of Bohuslavka and Mykhaylivske, also known as Hrosulove. The area was settled after 1792, when the lands between the Southern Bug and the Dniester were transferred to Russia according to the Iasi Peace Treaty. Bohuslavka was founded in the end of the 18th century, and Hrosulove was founded in 1793. The name of Hrosulove comes from the landowner, Grosul-Tolstoy. The area was included in Tiraspol Uyezd, which belonged to Yekaterinoslav Viceroyalty until 1795, Voznesensk Viceroyalty until 1796, Novorossiya Governorate until 1803, and Kherson Governorate until 1920.

Velyka Mykhailivka is known for the 1919 pogrom of the Jewish inhabitants.

During World War II, when the area formed part of the Romanian-occupied Transnistria Governorate, the settlement was the site of the Grosulovo concentration camp, a Romanian-administered internment camp. Established in 1941, it initially held Jewish deportees and local Jews. In October 1943, hundreds of predominantly Jewish political prisoners were transferred there following the closure of the Vapniarka concentration camp. The prisoners were later evacuated westward into Bessarabia in 1944 under Colonel Sabin Motora.

On 16 April 1920, Odessa Governorate split off, and Odessky Uyezd was moved to Odessa Governorate. In 1923, uyezds in Ukrainian Soviet Socialist Republic were abolished, and the governorates were divided into okruhas. Hrosulove was included into Odessa Okruha. On 7 March 1923 Hrosulove Raion with the administrative center in Hrosulove was established. In 1930, okruhas were abolished, and on 27 February 1932, Odessa Oblast was established, and Hrosulove Raion was included into Odessa Oblast. In 1946, Hrosulove was renamed Velyka Mykhailivka, and Hrosulove Raion was renamed Velyka Mykhailivka Raion.

Until 18 July 2020, Velyka Mykhailivka was the administrative center of Velyka Mykhailivka Raion. The raion was abolished in July 2020 as part of the administrative reform of Ukraine, which reduced the number of raions of Odesa Oblast to seven. The area of Velyka Mykhailivka Raion was merged into Rozdilna Raion.

Until 26 January 2024, Velyka Mykhailivka was designated urban-type settlement. On this day, a new law entered into force which abolished this status, and Velyka Mykhailivka became a rural settlement.

== Economy ==
=== Transportation ===
The closest railway station is in Novoborysivka about 5 kilometres (3.1 mi) to the east. It is on the railway line connecting Odesa and Podilsk.
