= Joc dance ensemble =

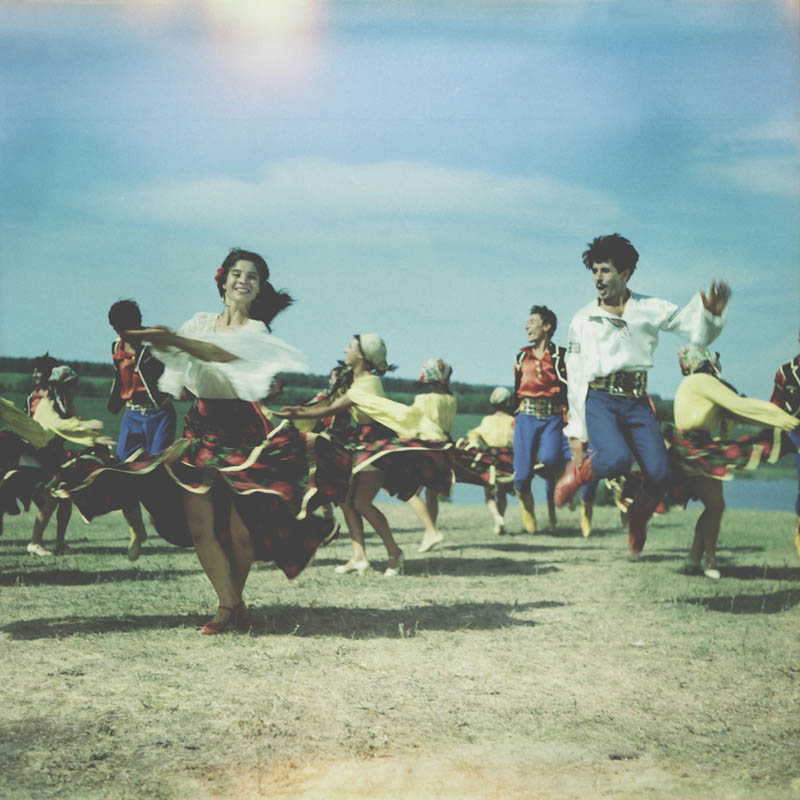
Joc

Joc is the oldest folk dance ensemble of Moldova; full name: National Academic Ensemble of Folk Dance "Joc"(Romanian: Ansamblul Academic Naţional de dansuri populare „Joc”)

Joc was created on August 13, 1945, by Leonid Leonardi and Leonid Zeltsman, then called simply "ensemble of Moldovan dance".

In 1954-55, Tankho Israelov was the director of the dance ensemble.

Its 13th director (since 1957) was Vladimir Curbet.

== Awards and recognition ==
- 1953: 1st place at the 4th World Festival of Youth and Students
- 1955:Meritorious ensemble of Moldavian SSR
- 1968: Lenin Komsomol Prize
