= Matei Gall =

Romanian writer and Holocaust survivor (born 1920)

Matei Gall (born 8 January 1920), also known as Moise-Matei Gal, is a Romanian writer, journalist and Holocaust survivor. A Romanian Jew and communist activist, he was imprisoned during the regime of Ion Antonescu and subsequently deported to the Vapniarka concentration camp in the Romanian-administered Transnistria Governorate. He was later transferred to Rîbnița, where he was one of three known survivors of the Rîbnița massacre in March 1944.

Gall was born in Deva into a Hungarian-speaking Jewish merchant family. He was the only son among five children. In 1938, while working at a textile factory in Lugoj, he came into contact with the underground Romanian Communist Party and became involved in communist activism. He was later dismissed from the factory after attempting to organize a strike.

Gall was arrested for his political activity and imprisoned at Caransebeș. In September 1942, he and other Jewish political prisoners were deported to Vapniarka. In October 1943, Gall and other remaining prisoners were transferred to the prison at Rîbnița.

During the night of 18–19 March 1944, most of the prisoners at Rîbnița were killed. Gall survived the massacre by remaining beneath the bodies of murdered prisoners. He was one of three known survivors, alongside Pinhas Fischbach and Isac Valter. Gall was subsequently aided by Romanian soldiers and eventually returned to Romania.

Gall's novel Masacrul (1956), based on two articles he published in România Liberă in September 1944, dealt with the Rîbnița massacre. His 1997 memoir Eclipsa recounted his imprisonment, deportation and experiences under communism. Gall emigrated to Israel in 1969 and subsequently settled in Frankfurt, West Germany.

In 2023, historians Ștefan Cristian Ionescu and Dana Mihăilescu examined changes in Gall's autobiographical accounts of the Holocaust during communist and post-communist Romania in Yad Vashem Studies.
