= Târgu Jiu internment camp =

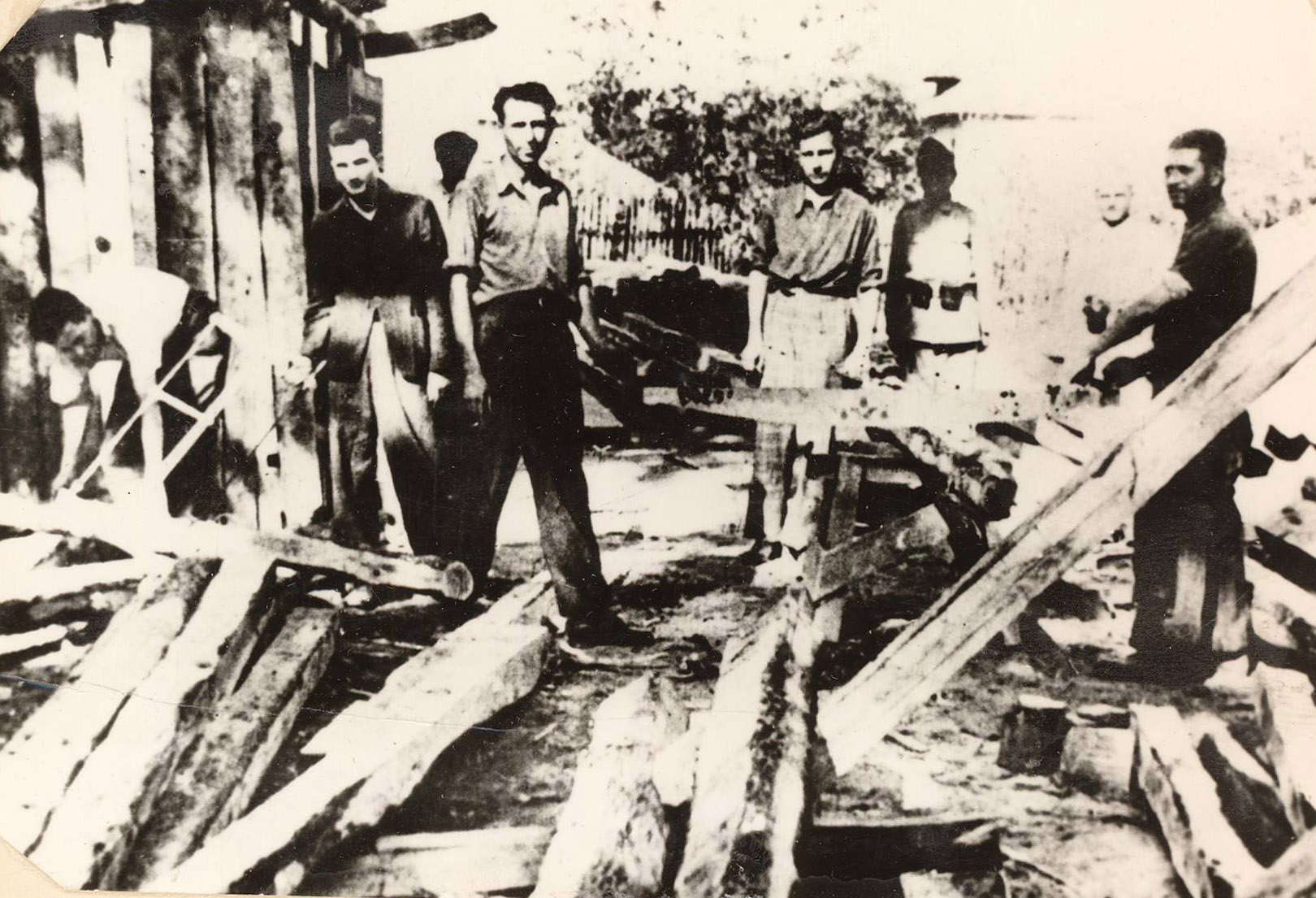
Nicolae Ceaușescu (second from left) and other political detainees of the Antonescu regime in Târgu Jiu

The Târgu Jiu internment camp was a detention facility in Târgu Jiu, Romania. It was a regular prison from 1895 to 1939 and again after 1945, but is best known for its role as an internment camp for various categories of individuals during World War II.

The prison was built between 1888 and 1895 in the northeastern part of the city. Initially used for pre-trial detention, it had a capacity of 87 to 139 people, depending on how much space each was allocated. Eventually, prisoners with sentences of up to six months were also sent there. The brick walls were 70–80 centimeters thick. Running water was installed in 1957–1960. In 1939, a camp was established at Târgu Jiu for Polish military personnel and civilians who had fled Poland following the invasion of Poland. Later, it housed up to 414 Jews, mostly from Bessarabia, suspected of communist activity. In September 1942, all but seven were deported to the Vapniarka concentration camp.

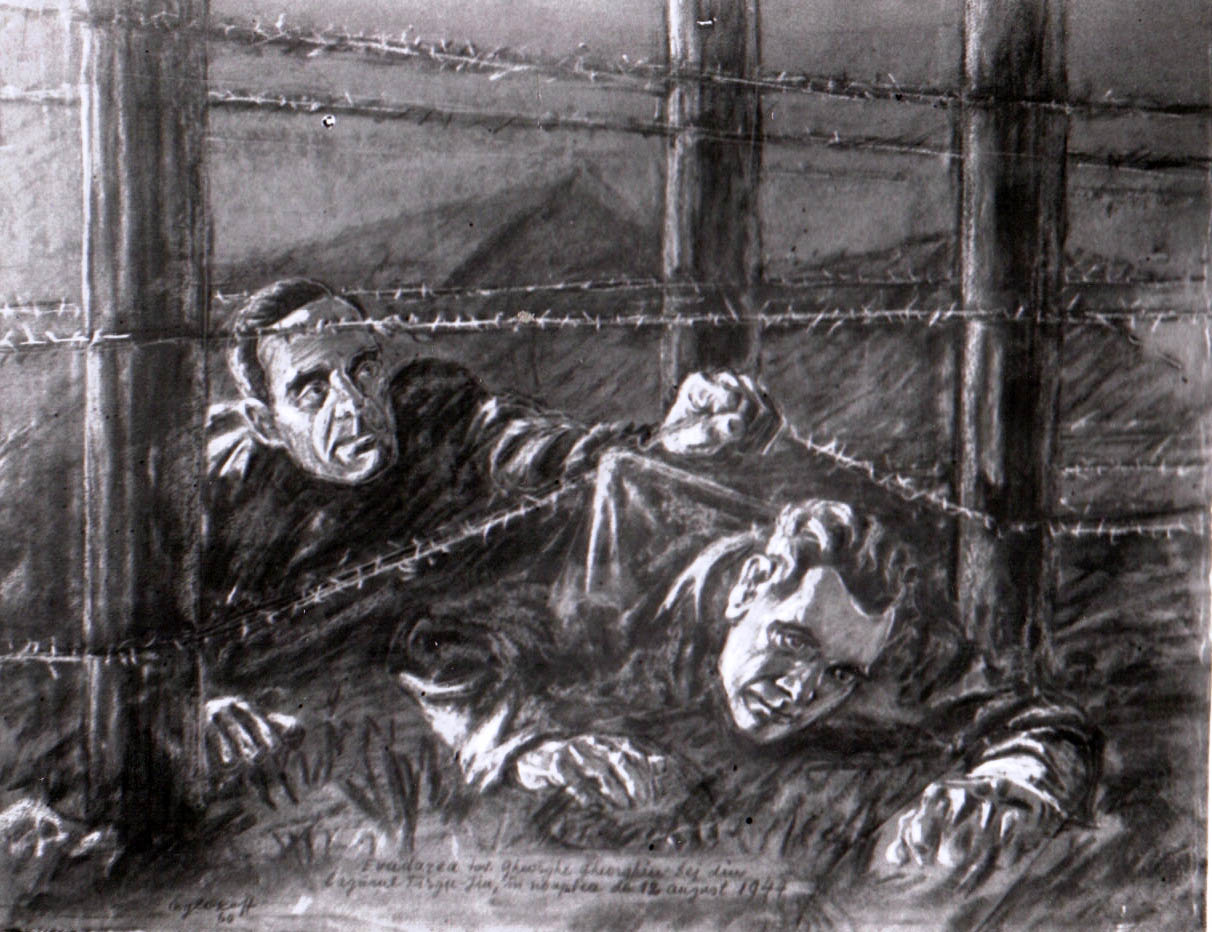
Gheorghe Gheorghiu-Dej (left) escaping from the Târgu Jiu camp in August 1944. Propaganda drawing from 1960.

Under the Ion Antonescu regime, Romanian Communist Party members and other political opponents were interned at Târgu Jiu during World War II. The former Polish refugee camp was redesignated as a political internment camp in February 1941 and was administered by the Romanian Gendarmerie rather than the prison administration. Internment could be ordered administratively by the Interior Ministry and was not limited to communists; suspected opponents from several political currents could be detained.

Conditions for the communist internees improved after the Battle of Stalingrad, and most of them were sent to work outside the camp. International Red Aid sent food and money. Internees in 1943–1944 included Gheorghe Gheorghiu-Dej, Chivu Stoica, Mișu Dulgheru, Nicolae Ceaușescu, and Lucrețiu Pătrășcanu. Gheorghiu-Dej arrived in late June 1943, was hospitalized with a stomach ailment from July to October and escaped with outside assistance in August 1944, shortly before the overthrow of Antonescu.

Tudor Arghezi was detained there in 1943, having been arrested after writing a pamphlet critical of Nazi German ambassador Manfred Freiherr von Killinger. After the 1944 coup, the camp, with a capacity of some 5,200, was used for interning accused war criminals and ethnic Germans. Conditions were miserable and many died.

In December 1945, the prison was reserved for criminals with short sentences. They were joined by political prisoners, both Securitate detainees held without trial and those sentenced for sabotage. There were 111 prisoners in 1948 and 89 in 1953, mostly political. Part of them had to work nine hours a day on poor rations. Worksites included the Soviet cemetery, the stadium, and roads under construction. After 1953, the prison held only common criminals.
