= Rîbnița massacre =

1944 mass killing of prisoners in Romanian-occupied Transnistria

- Part of The Holocaust in Romania and World War II
- Location: Rîbnița, Transnistria Governorate (now Moldova)
- Date: 19–20 March 1944
- Attack type: Mass shooting
- Deaths: 238 to 262
- Perpetrator: German SS Kalmyk personnel

The Rîbnița massacre was a mass killing of prisoners at Rîbnița in the Romanian-administered Transnistria Governorate during World War II. During the withdrawal of Romanian and German forces before the advancing Red Army in March 1944, German forces took control of the town and executed more than 200 prisoners held in the local prison during the night of 19–20 March 1944. The victims included locals suspected of supporting the anti-fascist resistance, as well as a group of Romanian Jewish political prisoners who had previously been held at the Vapniarka concentration camp. Only seven survivors were recorded, four among the locals and three among the Romanians. Survivor Matei Gall left several accounts of the massacre.

== Background ==
Rîbnița was part of the Moldavian Autonomous Soviet Socialist Republic before the Axis invasion of the Soviet Union. After its occupation in 1941, it became part of the Transnistria Governorate, the territory between the Dniester and Southern Bug rivers placed under Romanian administration. Romanian authorities established a ghetto in Rîbnița, where Jews from the surrounding region and Jews deported from Romanian-controlled territories were confined. Overcrowding, inadequate food and an outbreak of typhus caused numerous deaths, and Romanian forces also carried out executions of ghetto inmates.

The prison at Rîbnița held political prisoners and other detainees. Some of the best-documented prisoners were transferred there from Vapniarka, an internment camp established by Romanian authorities for Jewish political prisoners and others considered politically suspect. As Soviet forces approached Transnistria in late 1943, Romanian authorities began closing the Vapniarka camp. Eighty prisoners were transferred to ghettos elsewhere in Transnistria, while most of the remaining prisoners were eventually sent back toward Romania. A separate group of 54 Jewish communists was transferred to the prison at Rîbnița.

== Massacre ==
By March 1944, Soviet forces were advancing rapidly into Transnistria. On 17 March, as the Red Army approached Rîbnița, Romanian authorities permitted deportees in the town's ghetto to return toward Romania. The following day Romanian forces withdrew from Rîbnița and transferred control of the town to German forces.

The prisoners held in the local prison remained behind. During the German occupation of the town, more than 200 inmates of the prison were executed, including many Jewish prisoners.

According to Romanian survivor Pinhas Fischbach, the prisoners had organized an underground resistance group led by Soviet Major I. Parkhomenko. With the help of a Rîbnița physician, Naumenko, the group maintained contact with the local partisans, led by S. M. Gritsenko, and had made preparations for a prison break as the front approached. On the morning of 19 March, the prison administration told the Romanian prisoners to prepare for repatriation "within an hour or two". The prisoners began preparing for the journey, but nothing happened until the evening, when they heard gunfire coming from the upper floors.

According to the account of survivor Valentin A. Frantskovich, recorded in 1945 by a commission established by the authorities of the Moldavian Soviet Socialist Republic, around 40 Nazi soldiers armed with rifles and machine guns took control of the prison at approximately 10 p.m. on 19 March. The group also included Soviet collaborationists, described as "Vlasov's Cossacks". Led by the Romanian prison warden, Pantelei Valuța, the soldiers moved through cells holding Soviet prisoners and Romanian political detainees, shooting the inmates and locking the cells afterward. They then killed those who remained alive, locked the prison, and set the building on fire.

A similar account was provided by survivor Chiril Țurcan, a partisan leader in Slobozia, recorded by historian Petru Șornikov. According to Țurcan, around 15 prisoners initially survived the shootings. When the prison was set on fire at dawn on 20 March, several were shot while attempting to escape by Nazi soldiers guarding the building. The remaining seven survivors were able to leave the prison the following night. Țurcan stated that they received assistance from a local woman and later hid at the home of a relative of one of the survivors, Anatoliy Balan.

According to the 1945 commission's records, 238 people were shot or burned to death, while seven survived. Later research placed the total number of victims at 262. Among those killed was Yakov Kucherov, a leader of the Moldovan partisans in Camenca. The victims included most of the group of Jewish Romanian political prisoners transferred from Vapniarka, including its leaders, Andrei Bernat and Lazăr Grünberg. Recent research identified the perpetrators as German SS personnel of Kalmyk origin.

The 54 prisoners were mostly Romanian Jews who had been detained because of their communist or other anti-fascist political activity. According to survivor testimony and archival documents published in 2024, German SS troops carried out the killings, with the complicity of the Romanian prison guards who should normally have escorted the Romanian Jews safely to Romania, as had happened with another group of them. Three members of the Romanian group— Fischbach, Matei Gall and Isac Valter—survived the massacre. Their accounts later became important sources for reconstructing what happened inside the prison. Gall subsequently wrote about his experiences in Masacrul (1956) and Eclipsa (1997), while previously unpublished accounts by Fischbach and Valter were published decades later. The group of four Soviet survivors included Țurcan, Frantskovich, Balan and S. Gritsak.

The Red Army captured Rîbnița on 30 March 1944.

== Documentation ==
The massacre has been reconstructed from survivor testimony, Romanian archival records and material preserved by the United States Holocaust Memorial Museum. The experiences of Fischbach, Gall and Valter form a particularly detailed record of the killing of the Vapniarka prisoners.

In 2024, Mihaela Gligor and Ofelia Thirer edited the documentary volume Rîbnița însângerată. Mărturii din acele zile. Cu o corespondență între supraviețuitori. The book includes previously unpublished testimony by Fischbach and Valter, correspondence between former prisoners and archival documents from the Romanian National Archives and the United States Holocaust Memorial Museum. Historian Paul A. Shapiro contributed an introduction, while Holocaust historian Radu Ioanid wrote the preface.

== See also ==
- History of the Jews in Transnistria
