= Nicolae Sulac =

Moldovan folk singer

Nicolae Sulac OR PAU
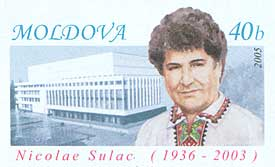
- 2005 stamp of Moldova
- Born: 9 September 1936; Sadîc, Kingdom of Romania
- Died: 8 April 2003 (aged 66); Chişinău, Moldova
- Resting place: Chişinău
- Occupation: Musician
- Children: 2, includling Doina Sulac
- Awards: Order of the Republic (Moldova)

Nicolae Sulac (9 September 1936 – 8 April 2003) was a folk music singer from the Republic of Moldova.

Throughout his career, he sang the hits such as "What a nice cuckoo is singing" (Ce frumos mai cântă cucul), "Youth" (Tinerețe, tinerețe), "Magheran green leaf" (Foaie verde mageran), "When my father comes" (Când tata va veni), "Sulac's flower" (Floarea lui Sulac), Doinas "Miorița" and „Mouring Doina” (Doina de Jale), "In the Prut forest"(În pădurea de la Prut), etc.

== Biography ==
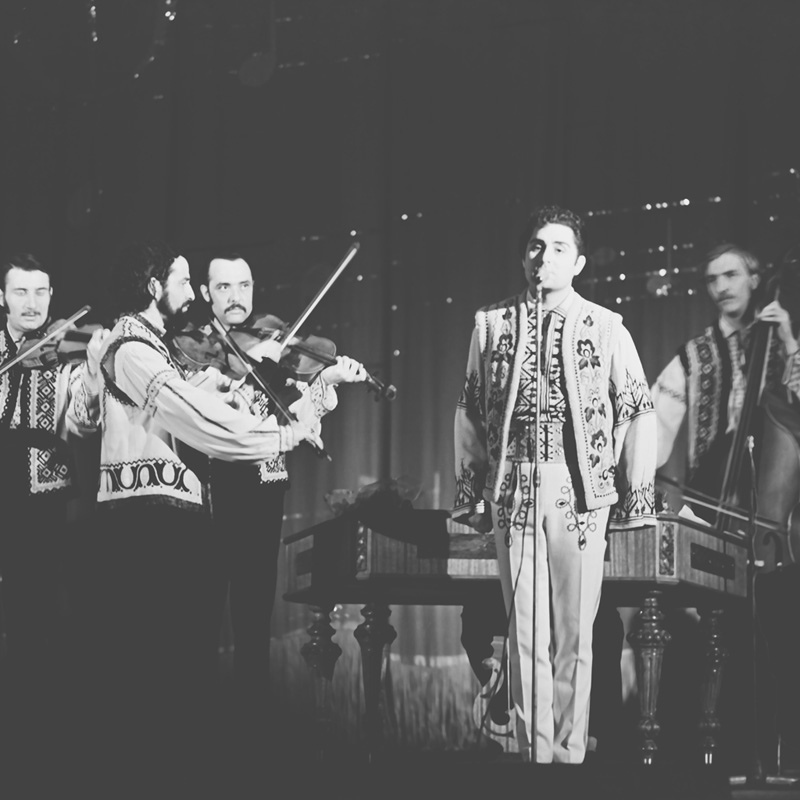
Sulac at a concert in the '70s in Cernăuți

Nicolae Sulac was born on 9 September 1936 in the village of Sadîc, County of Cahul, România (now the Republic of Moldova). His artistic career began in the Moldavian Soviet Socialist Republic, in the Doina choir chapel (since 1959). In 1965, Nicolae Sulac became the lead singer of the "Fluieraș" ensemble, ensemble that launched many folk musicians from Moldova. In the 1970s and early 1980s he performed as the leading singer of the "Lăutarii" ensemble.

Nicolae Sulac is the winner of awards of the Union of Soviet Socialist Republics (USSR), and later of the Republic of Moldova, and was awarded the Order of the Republic (1992).

In 2002, he set up a fund for supporting folk music.

Nicolae Sulac sing the songs exclusively in Romanian language, being applauded every time by the whole hall, even by those who did not know the Romanian language.

By the end of his life, Sulac had a wish to move to Iași, the town he liked the most and where he used to meet with friends.

He died in Chișinău in 2003 after a stroke and was buried in the Chișinău Central Cemetery. On October 9, 2004, his bust was inaugurated at the Central Cemetery.

In 2007, postum, Nicolae Sulac's album On a Edge of Road (La o margine de drum) appeared on the market.

His daughter, Doina Sulac, is following the family tradition. She is a singer of folk music like her famous father.

== Discography ==
- "Cântec de veselie" (1973)
- "Nicolae Sulac și Lăutarii" (1984)
- "Dorul meu e numai dor" (1999-2000)
- "De ziua lui" (2003)
- "La o margine de drum" (2006)

== Awards and honors ==
- Order of the Republic (Moldova)
- Artist al Poporului
- Laureat al Premiului de Stat
- Festivalul-Concurs Naţional al Interpreţilor Cântecului Popular "Nicolae Sulac"
- "Nicolae Sulac" School
- People's Artist of the USSR
