= Forced labor in Nazi concentration camps =

Unfree labor in concentration camps operated by Nazi Germany

Forced labor was an important and ubiquitous aspect of the Nazi concentration camps which operated in Nazi Germany and German-occupied Europe between 1933 and 1945. It was the harshest and most inhumane part of a larger system of forced labor in Nazi Germany.

== Origins ==
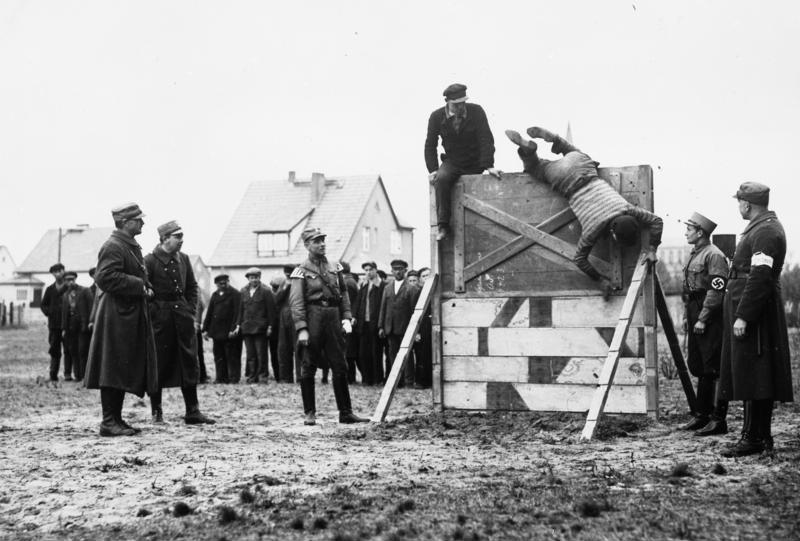
Forced exercises at Oranienburg, 1933

Traditionally, prisoners were often deployed in penal labor performing unskilled work. During the first years of Nazi Germany's existence, unemployment was high and forced labor in the concentration camps was presented as re-education through labor and a means of punishing offenders. Nazi propaganda idolized work, in contrast to the view of work as punishment. Prisoners in early camps were forced to perform economically valueless but strenuous tasks, such as farming on moorland (for example at Esterwegen). Other prisoners had to work on constructing and expanding the camps. German state governments complained at being required to pay the upkeep of the camps, which was eventually taken over by the SS with costs reduced by forcing inmates to work. At Dachau, two streams of labor developed, one for punishing but less economically valuable labor, while a parallel system of workshops developed where prisoners performed economically valuable labor in much better conditions.

The Four Year Plan of 1936 led to a shortage of labor, as free workers were diverted to projects related to German rearmament. By the end of 1937, full employment was reached outside the camps, and in particular there was a shortage of labor for construction work. A significant increase of the use of prisoner labor for productive tasks resulted in 1937 and 1938. SS chief Heinrich Himmler also used the labor shortage as a reason to expand the concentration camp system in the prewar period, despite other Nazi leaders such as Hermann Göring disagreeing with the expansion. The businesses were initially overseen by the Personal Staff Reichsführer-SS office. In 1938, mass roundups of so-called "work-shy" and "anti-social" individuals brought another 10,000 prisoners into the camps. The desire to exclude these people from the German national community was complementary to the goal of exploiting their labor. (Note: Ulrich Greifelt, head of Himmler's office of the Four Year Plan, stated: "Given the strains on the labour market, National Socialist work discipline dictated the forcible seizure and employment of all persons unwilling to adapt to the working life of the nation, i.e. work-shy and asocial individuals who are just vegetating . . . Well over 10,000 asocials are currently undergoing re-education in the concentration camps, which are admirably suited to the purpose.") These roundups coincided with and were fueled by the demand for prisoner labor to obtain building materials for Nazi architecture. Hard labor was a fundamental component of the concentration camp system and an aspect in the daily life of prisoners.

== Building materials ==
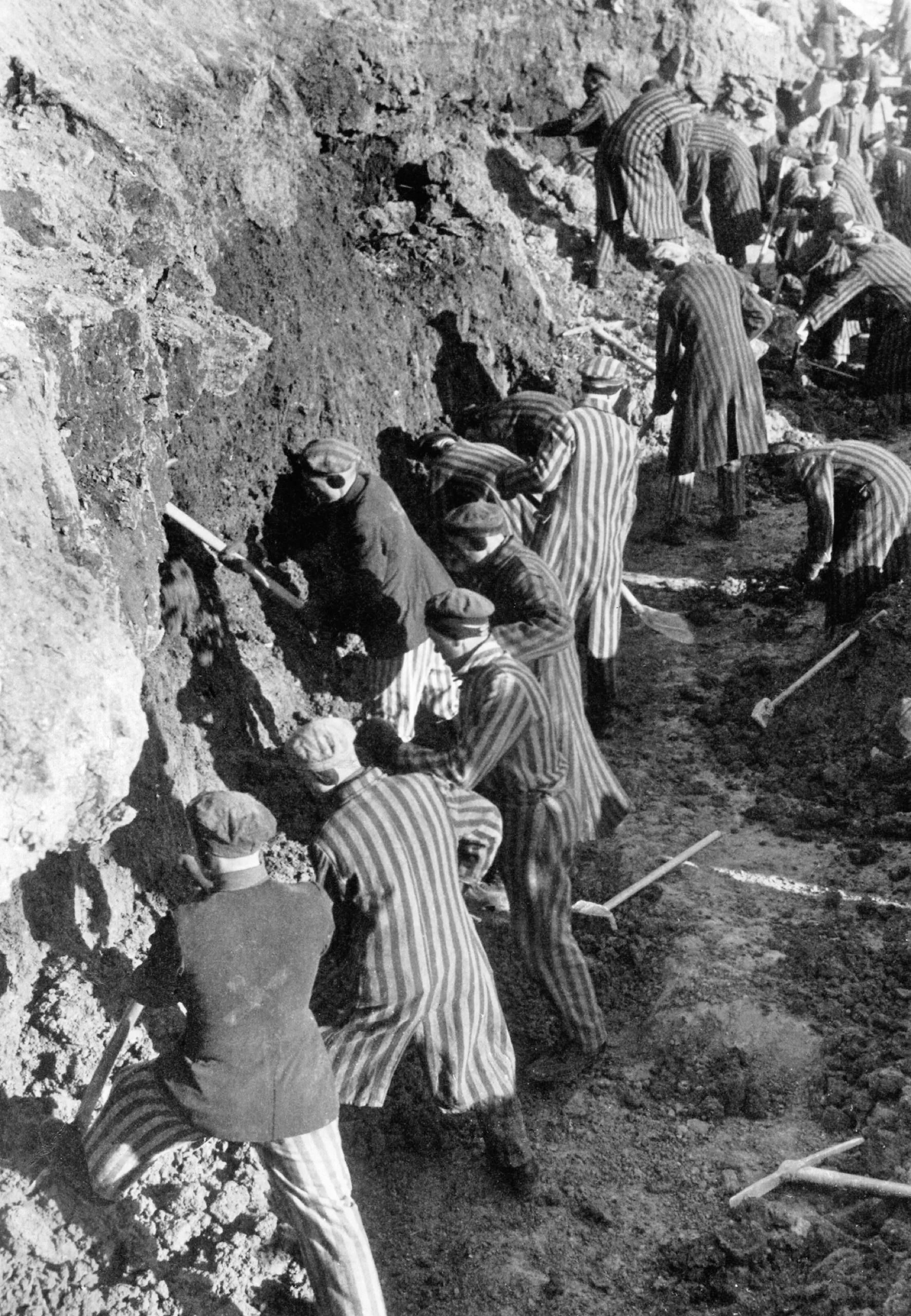
Forced labor at Sachsenhausen brickworks

The initiative for the foundation of SS companies dealing in building materials from concentration camps originated in 1937 with regional SS officials in Thuringia, especially the state's Interior Minister Hellmuth Gommlich. German Earth and Stone Works (DEST) was an SS-owned company founded on 29 April 1938 for the exploitation of prisoner labor in the concentration camps for the production of building materials. Soon organized under the SS Main Economic and Administrative Office (SS-WVHA), DEST had four main priorities for developing the economy of concentration camps: stone quarrying, brick production, street construction (soon shelved), and the acquisition of other enterprises for the above purposes. Although technically a private enterprise, its members were also, as SS officers, accountable to the SS hierarchy. Throughout DEST's history, Nazi architect Albert Speer's office for the reconstruction of Berlin (GBI) was the most significant investor and customer of DEST's products, signing various contracts large and small for building materials. Before World War II, DEST's quarries were profitable, while its brickworks operated at a loss. By the beginning of the war, four of the six concentration camps were producing or preparing to produce building materials. The production of building materials continued to expand until 1942, and the SS scaled back on building materials in 1943–1944 in order to focus on arms production.

=== Brickworks ===
Bricks were the SS's entrance into the construction industry, justified by the demand for bricks by the GBI for the Führerbauten, as private industry was only able to fill 18 percent of the GBI's demanded 2 billion bricks annually. On 1 July 1938, SS chief Heinrich Himmler and Speer came to an agreement by which the GBI promised to buy 120 million bricks annually for the next ten years, with the SS receiving an advance payment of 9.5 million Reichsmarks. This granted DEST the funding it needed to invest in the concentration camp industries. A ceremony on 6 July marked the ground-breaking on what was planned to be the world's largest brickworks, 2 kilometres (1.2 mi) from Sachsenhausen concentration camp. Construction of a brickworks in Buchenwald also began during mid-1938. Delivery of bricks was supposed to start in October, but that did not occur due to problems with the Sachsenhausen brickworks, and the GBI renegotiated the contract to pay less than the 9 million Reichsmarks promised.

In August 1938, the SS acquired a brickyard in Hamburg, which would be the site of Neuengamme concentration camp, founded in 1940. The bricks from Neuengamme were contracted for by the city of Hamburg for use in Nazi construction projects. Bricks were an important building material due to the Four Year Plan's restrictions on the use of iron. Except for Neuengamme, whose clay deposits were superior, the concentration camp brick production was not of high enough quality for use in façades and were instead used for structure. The SS brick industry was not as successful or economically productive as the quarries.

=== Quarries ===
Wiener Graben quarry adjacent to Mauthausen, 1942

Flossenbürg and Mauthausen were established in 1938, their sites specifically chosen for their proximity to granite quarries whose stone was to be used for monumental Nazi architecture projects. Of the prewar concentration camps, Flossenbürg was the one that was most significant and consistent in producing income for DEST. For example, it produced 2,898 cubic metres (102,300 cu ft) of stone in 1939, almost three-quarters of the total production that year. The largest buyer of Flossenbürg granite was Albert Speer's office for the reconstruction of Berlin. Within this project the largest and most significant orders were for Wilhelm Kreis' Soldiers' Hall (Soldatenhalle) project, beginning in 1940. Increasing amounts of stone were used for road building; 15% in 1939 but 60% the next year.

Natzweiler and Gross-Rosen main camps were also established near quarries in 1940. The Natzweiler quarry was unprofitable but acquired anyway because Speer hoped to use its red granite to build the Reich Chancellery. In 1941, DEST established Oranienburg II, a stone processing facility near Sachsenhausen where prisoners cut stone for Nazi building projects in Berlin. Stonemason programs were established at Flossenbürg, Gross-Rosen and Natzweiler, for selected inmates to learn stonecraft from civilian experts. Those who passed the course enjoyed better treatment. Stone from the concentration camp quarries was used for construction of the camp, the Reichsautobahn, and various SS military projects, but later on it was destined for the monumental German Stadium project and the Nazi party rally grounds in Nuremberg. In the quarries, prisoners labored in particularly brutal conditions, causing many deaths.

== Workshops ==
From the late 1930s, workshops were started in the concentration camps where prisoners were forced to produce various products. SS Commercial Operations of Dachau produced clothing, shoes, and carpentry for the nearby SS troop training center. They were under the indirect control of the SS finance apparatus led by Oswald Pohl and August Frank until transferred directly to the training department in late 1935. Miscellaneous ventures in the late 1930s included a bakery in Sachsenhausen which was to produce 100,000 loaves a day for the camp and the Waffen-SS. In May 1939, the SS company German Equipment Works (DAW) was set up to oversee the concentration camp workshops. In 1940–1941, the variety of items produced was reduced, such that the workshops focused on supplying furniture to the SS and to resettled ethnic Germans. At the end of 1941, the company had plants in Dachau, Sachsenhausen, Buchenwald, and Auschwitz. A different company, Gesellschaft für Textil und Lederverwertung, oversaw the concentration camp workshops that supplied the SS with clothing.

== Construction ==
From the earliest days of the camp system, prisoners were employed in constructing and expanding camp infrastructure to reduce costs.

=== Municipal projects ===
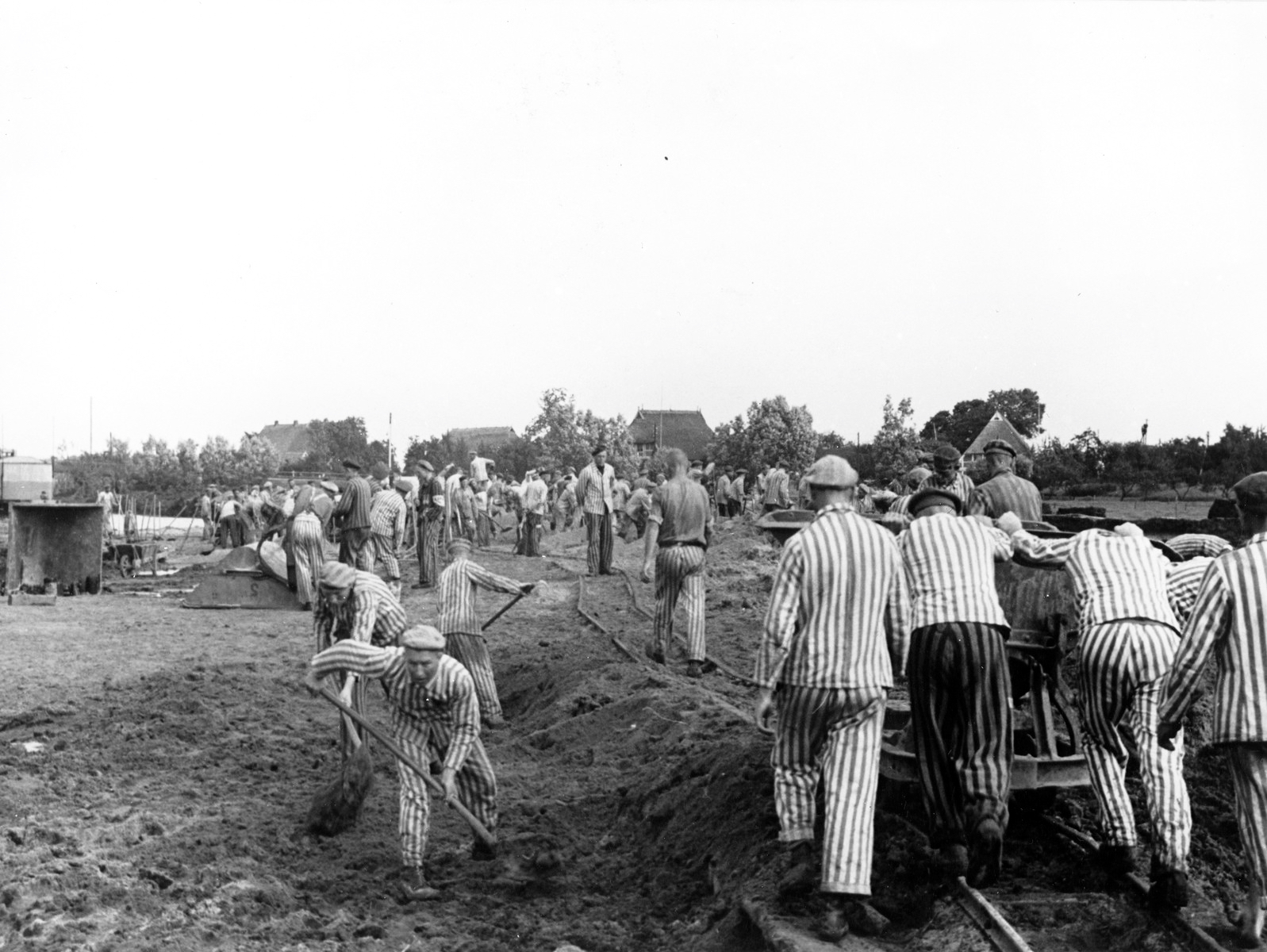
Neuengamme prisoners working on the Dove-Elbe canal

The contract between DEST and the city of Hamburg also provided for the use of Neuengamme prisoners to work on levees and canals.

Ideas of using concentration camp prisoners for mobile construction brigades dated to 1941, when the idea was first proposed by the SS-WVHA to develop Nazi-occupied Eastern Europe. The bombing of Lübeck on 28/9 March 1942 marked the beginning of area bombing of German cities, which caused significant destruction. Deployment of forced labor to repair the damage was initiated by local bureaucrats; German historian Karola Fings notes that the demand "points to general acceptance of the concentration camps". In September 1942, Himmler recommended using concentration camp prisoners for the fabrication of window and door frames (in various concentration camps) and producing brick tiles in the Neuengamme brickworks. At the same time, he authorized the formation of SS construction brigades (German: SS-Baubrigaden), detachments of concentration camp prisoners who operated in bomb-damaged cities for clearing debris and repairing damaged buildings. Prisoners in these brigades lived and worked in plain sight of the German population.

=== Generalplan Ost ===
Nazi plans for the colonization of Eastern Europe, known as Generalplan Ost, were planned to be completed with concentration camp labor. SS planner Konrad Meyer estimated that unfree labor would make the projects 20 percent cheaper after accounting for food and clothing for the prisoners. The desire to use concentration camp prisoners for Generalplan Ost-related construction demanded a significant increase in the prisoner population, and the establishment of Auschwitz II and Majdanek (to hold 50,000 prisoners) was announced for this purpose on 27 September 1941. Initially the new camps were planned to be populated by Soviet prisoners of war.

== War industries ==
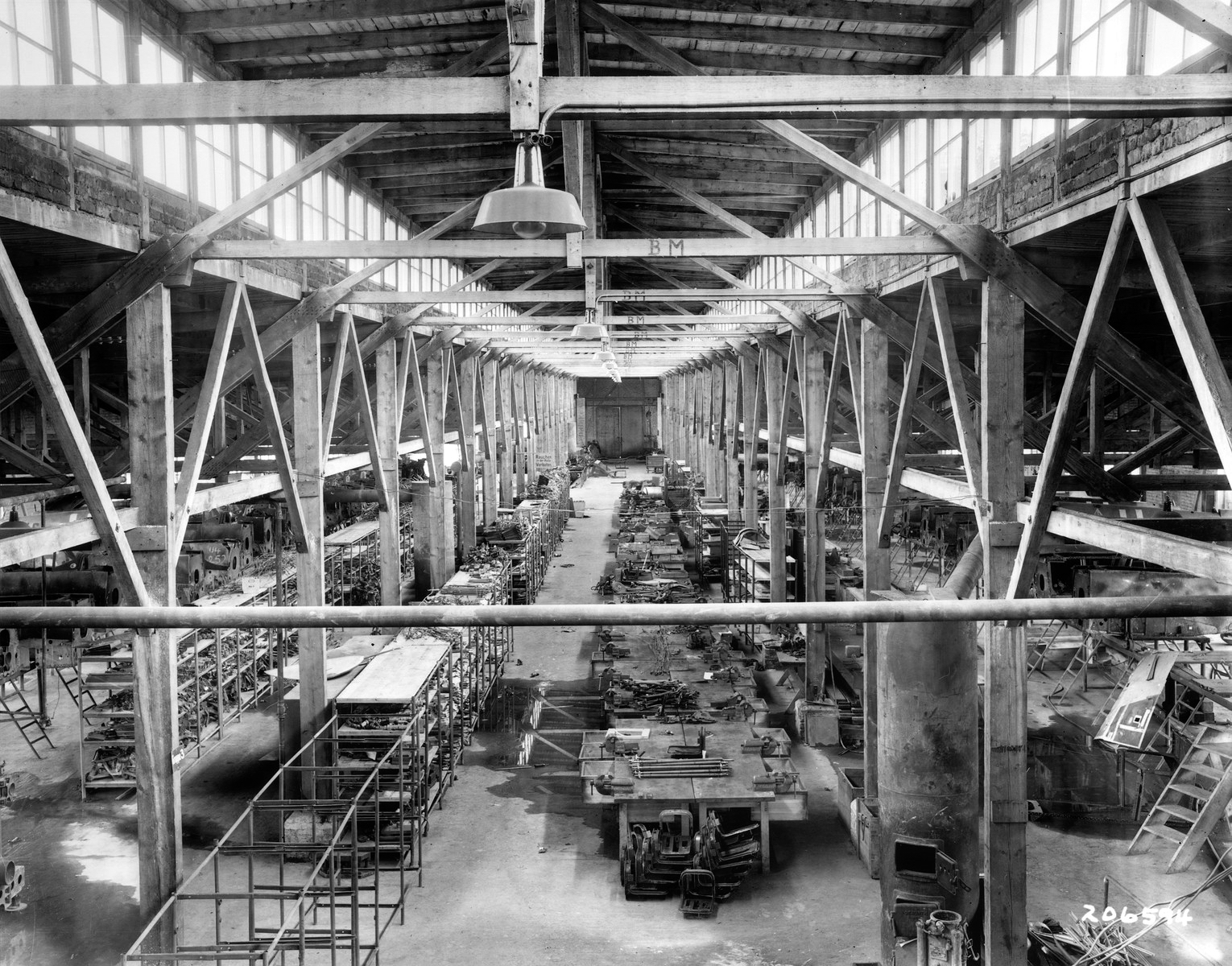
Aircraft factory at Flossenbürg, photographed after liberation

After the outbreak of war in September 1939, the SS was exempted from the need to convert its concentration camp industries to the war economy; SS planners expected a quick end to the war. In the second half of 1941, military setbacks on the Eastern Front, led to increased prioritization of war production, placed under Speer's authority as the newly appointed head of the Reich Ministry of Armaments and War Production. In early 1942, Fritz Sauckel was given the task of recruiting forced labor to expand war production. As late as February 1942, the SS was not focused on the armaments issue, but it soon realized that it might lose control of prisoners to other Nazi agencies, spurring action.

Incorporation of the IKL into the SS Main Economic and Administrative Office (SS-WVHA) in 1942 triggered substantial change in the camp system, as Oswald Pohl ordered that prisoners' labor be reoriented towards production and that time-consuming exercises such as roll calls be abandoned. Pohl also extended working hours to eleven hours a day, so that prisoners had to work 72 hours a week. Rations were reduced at the same time, and mortality rates peaked, with 75,545 prisoners dying between July and November 1942. As late as September 1942, of the 110,000 prisoners in the camp system, only 5 percent were employed in tasks that supported the armaments industry and just over 1 percent worked directly on armaments production. By the end of 1944, concentration camp prisoners supplied around 5 percent of the labor in Germany's armaments factories, at least 500,000 workers. Of these, 140,000 werew building underground factories, 130,000 were employed by Organization Todt, and 230,000 by private enterprise.

=== Petrochemicals ===
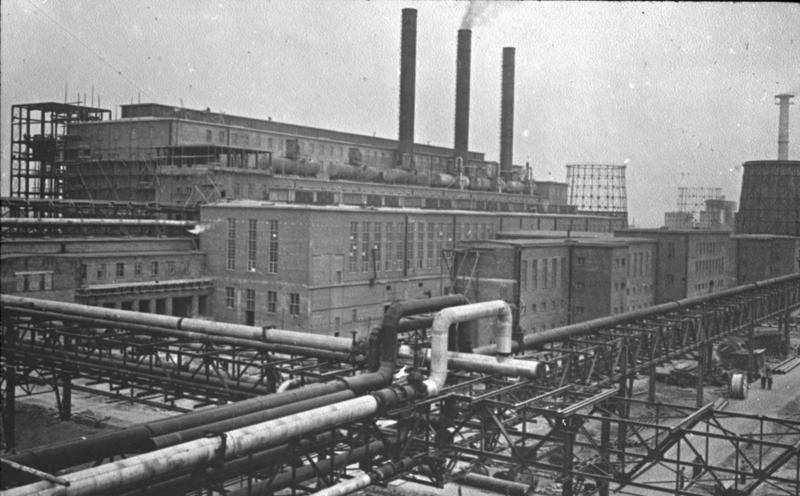
IG-Farbenwerke Auschwitz

The Buna factory at Monowitz (Auschwitz III) was originally built to produce synthetic rubber, in a deal negotiated by IG Farben in February 1940. The SS invested least 610 million Reichsmarks in the site, but it never produced any rubber. By 1942 the SS switched it to methanol production, a high-priority war material used to produce aircraft fuel and explosives. Monowitz and IG Farben's other sites in Upper Silesia —Heydebreck (iso-octane air fuel) and Blechhammer (synthetic fuel) — accounted for a significant percent of fuel production in 1944 following the bombing of IG Farben's Leuna works and, according to the United States Strategic Bombing Survey, rescued the German war effort. At least 30,000 prisoners died at Monowitz.

=== Aircraft ===
By early 1941, Heinkel was building an annex to its factory in Oranienburg to employ prisoners of Sachsenhausen to build Heinkel He 177 bombers. The aircraft, however, was a technical failure due to impractical specifications.

=== Weapons ===
==== V-weapons ====
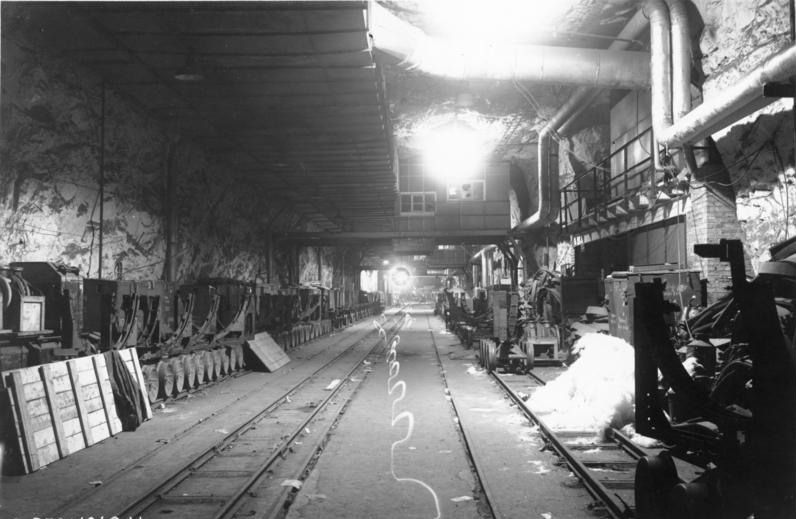
Interior of the Mittelwerk underground factory

== Forced labor and genocide ==
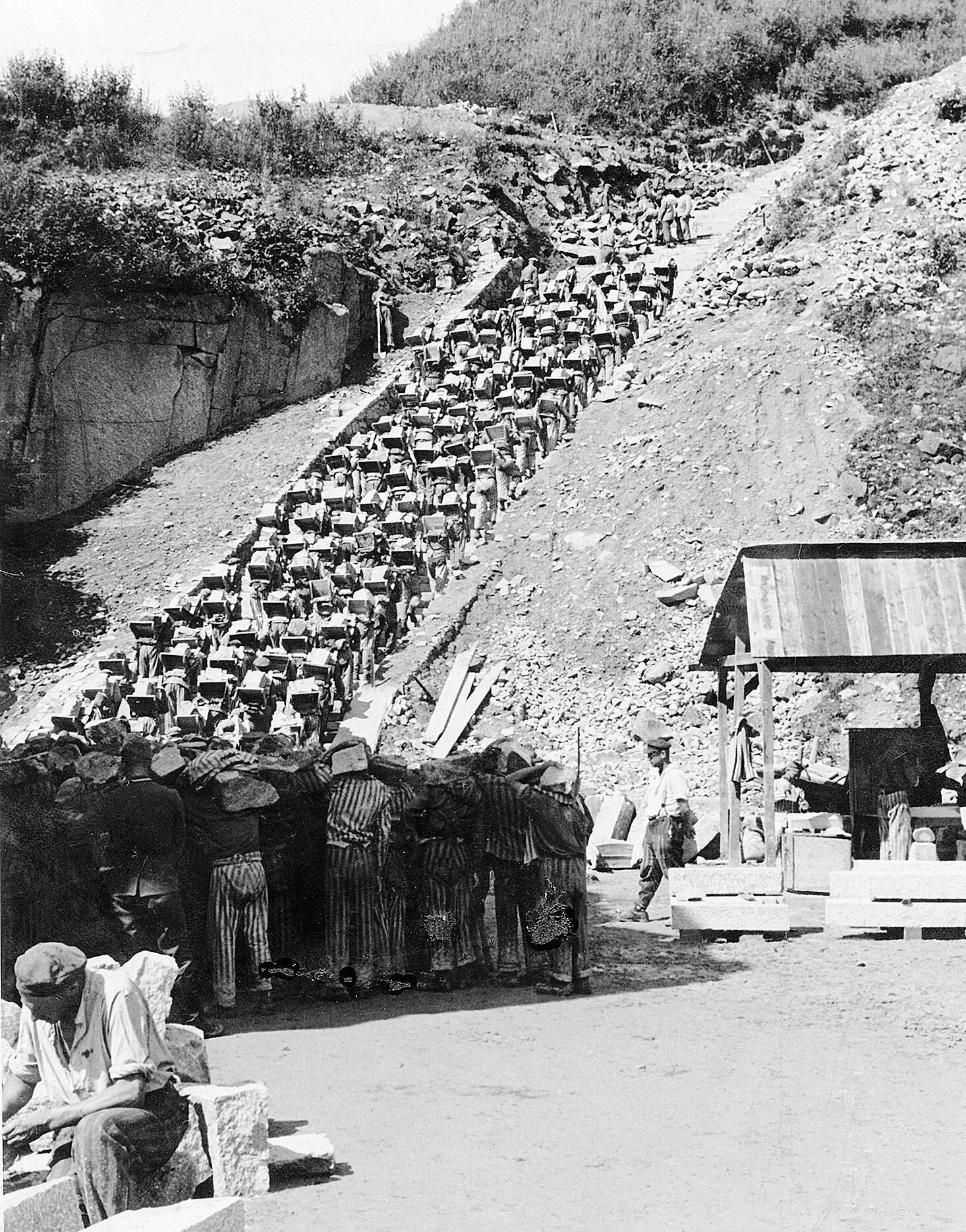
"Stairs of death" at Mauthausen

Concentration camp prisoners worked under harsher conditions than Ostarbeiters and other foreign forced laborers. At its height at the end of the war, concentration camp labor made up 3 percent of the labor force in Germany, remaining a quantitatively marginal element of the economy of Nazi Germany.

Although earlier historians of the concentration camps described forced labor as part of Nazi extermination processes (extermination through labor) this thesis has been questioned by more recent historiography. According to historians Marc Buggeln and Jens-Christian Wagner, the phrase implies a premeditated intent to exterminate prisoners that did not exist. Buggeln writes:

On the whole, one could essentially say that “extermination through labor” was practiced throughout the entire concentration camp system, particularly during the second half of 1942. Yet the particularly high mortality rates of the year 1942 can only be attributed to a limited extent to deliberate plans devised by the SS to murder certain inmates or groups of prisoners.

He also argues that in the concentration camp system was only genocidal for its Jewish and Romani prisoners since the number of prisoners of other nationalities was too small in relation to the total population.

== Role of private companies ==
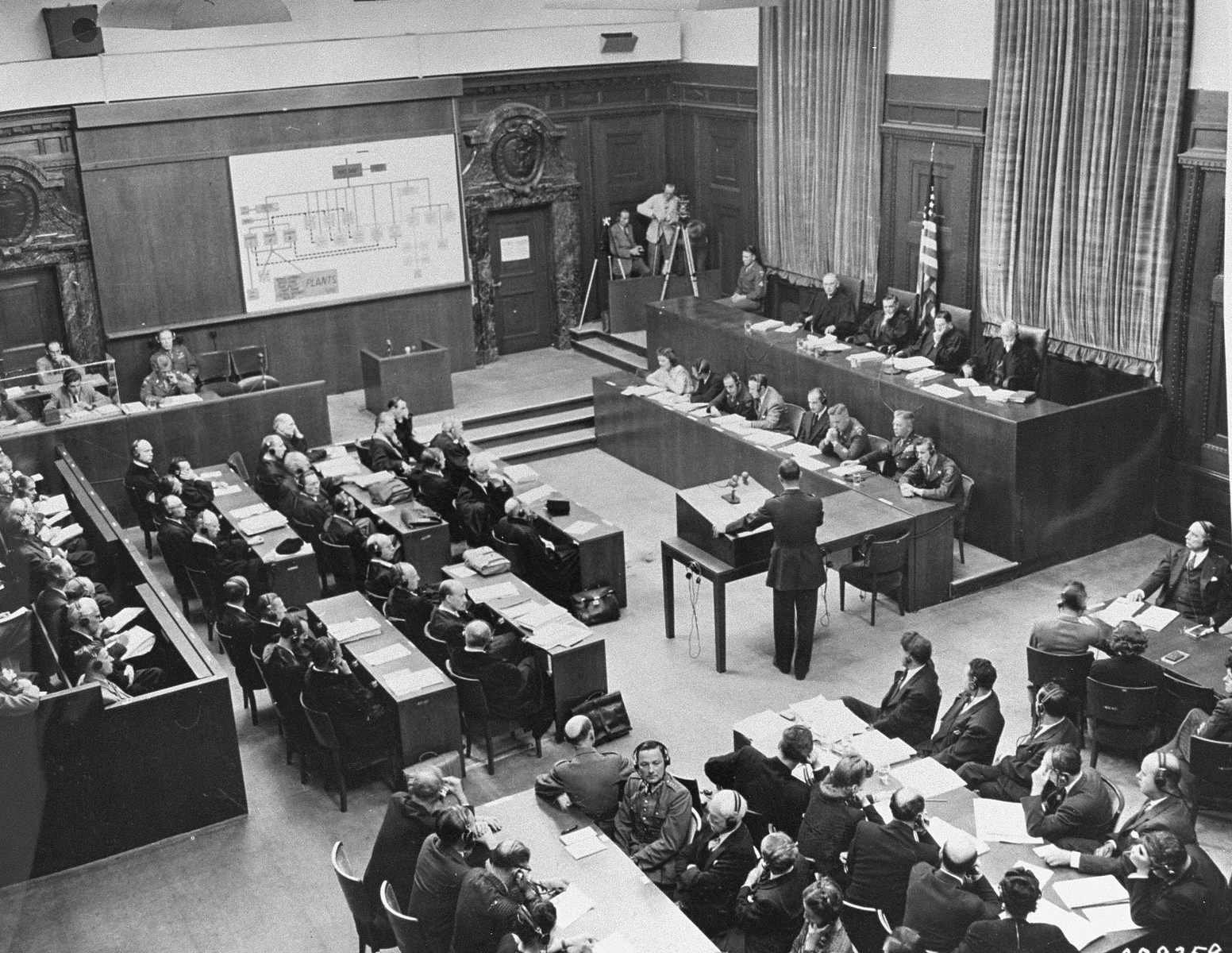
Telford Taylor opens the case against the defendants in the IG Farben trial.

The involvement of private companies in the concentration camps increased with two pilot projects beginning in early 1941: a few hundred prisoners from Auschwitz were leased to IG Farben and 300 Mauthausen prisoners to Steyr-Daimler-Puch. Both companies used prisoner labor to compensate for labor shortages, and initially employed prisoners only in unskilled and construction work. Through this arrangement, the SS retained control of the prisoners while obtaining material benefits: IG Farben provided materials for the construction of Auschwitz, while Steyr-Daimler-Puch offered cheaper weapons to the Waffen-SS. The companies complained that long transport of prisoners to work and arbitrary mistreatment from the SS reduced their productivity. Employment of prisoners by private companies was marginal until the end of 1941.

Until the end of 1942, the SS companies paid 30 pfennig per prisoner per day while private employers paid three and four Reichsmarks. This price included the clothing and food of prisoners as well as SS guard details, but the companies had to pay for accommodation and medical care. Therefore, they had a significant effect on conditions in the camps. Prisoners did not receive any of this money, which was paid into state coffers. The per diem cost encouraged employers to extend the working day as much as possible, which increased the mortality rate. Employees of private firms were in charge of monitoring prisoners' work performance and telling kapos which prisoners to beat. Sometimes physical punishments were meted out onsite, while at other times it was delayed until the prisoners returned to the subcamp. Most employees did not object to this role.

Private companies that used prisoner labor always took the initiative and were not coerced by the SS. Subcamps were established when companies submitted an application to the WVHA; if their purpose was considered high-priority enough, WVHA inspectors would examine the site for accommodation and security. Then a transport of prisoners and guards would arrive from the main camp. As the war progressed, allocation of prisoner labor was increasingly performed by the Ministry of Armaments rather than the WVHA, and from October 1944 applications for prisoner labor were submitted directly to the Ministry of Armaments.

Although both the state and private enterprise reaped profits from concentration camp labor, historians debate who profited most. The employment of concentration camp prisoners for manufacturing was more economically favorable than construction work, which might be profitable if worn-out prisoners were promptly replaced by fresh ones. Employers had an economic incentive to speed up the replacement process. Comprehensive documentation on the profitability and accounting of concentration camp labor is only available for a handful of projects. Universale Hoch und Tiefbau AG, the contractor hired by the German state to work on the Loibl tunnel connecting Austria with Slovenia, employed 800 prisoners of the Mauthausen subcamp Loibl. The company calculated that although prisoners were 40 percent less productive than free German workers, the prisoners cost less, even taking into account the cost of the SS guards and replacing the prisoners who became too weak to work. In order to recoup these profits, the state reduced the contracted price by 3.515 percent.

Three of the subsequent Nuremberg trials (Flick trial, IG Farben trial, and Krupp trial) concerned crimes by companies in Nazi Germany, including the use of forced labor from concentration camp prisoners. In the Flick and IG Farben trials, the judges accepted the defendants' arguments of necessity in the use of forced labor. Business leaders denied responsibility for the using of forced labor and often claimed, incorrectly, that they had been forced to employ concentration camp labor by Nazi fiat, when in fact they sought out these prisoners to increase their profits and survive the war. Companies were reluctant to compensate survivors.

== Slavery analogy ==
Historians do not agree whether forced labor in concentration camps was a form of slavery, an analogy made by survivors. Concentration camp prisoners were not sold, only rented out, unlike chattel slavery (but similar to some forms of modern slavery). Another important difference is that most slaveholders value the lives of the slaves, while the SS considered its prisoners expendable; systematic murder continued despite the labor shortage. For this reason, Benjamin Ferencz described concentration camp prisoners as "less than slaves".

== See also ==
- Compulsory labor of the Jews in Romania
