= Blechhammer (disambiguation) =

Blechhammer refer to:

- Blechhammer, German name of the district of the City of Kędzierzyn-Koźle, nowadays Blachownia Śląska
- Blechhammer concentration camp, part of the Blechhammer area in Nazi Germany
- Blechhammer, area was the location of Nazi Germany chemical plants, prisoner of war camps and forced labour camps.
- Blechhammer, Eibenstock, Saxony, Germany
- Blechhammer, a Bavarian community/hamlet of the Bodenwöhr municipality.
- Blechhammer, a Thuringian hamlet of the Goldisthal municipality.
- Blechhammer, a Thuringian hamlet of the Oberland am Rennsteig municipality at which Nazi Germany used forced labor in the Porzellanfabrik Bernhardshütte.
