= Limbenii =

Limbenii may refer to one of two communes in Glodeni District, Moldova:

- Limbenii Noi
- Limbenii Vechi
