= Tiraspol Agreement =

1941 treaty between Nazi Germany and Romania on Transnistria

Romanian territory in May 1942

The Tiraspol Agreement (Romanian: Acordul de la Tiraspol; German: Tiraspoler Abkommen) was an agreement between Nazi Germany and Romania signed on 19 August 1941 in the city of Tiraspol (now in Moldova, under Transnistrian control) regarding the Romanian administration of the region of Transnistria, which became the Transnistria Governorate. It fell under the rule of Gheorghe Alexianu, under immediate subordination of Ion Antonescu, the Conducător (leader) of Romania. It was signed during World War II, while the Axis invasion of the Soviet Union was taking place. The Tighina Agreement in which specific issues of the region were discussed entered in force shortly after, on 30 August. The agreement allowed full Romanian control over the territory between the Dniester and Southern Bug rivers, with the exception of the city of Odesa. The latter was ceded to Romania with some privileges for Germany in the Tighina Agreement.

Afterwards, Transnistria became the destination of many Jews from the recently recovered Romanian regions of Northern Bukovina and Bessarabia. Antonescu planned to colonize Transnistria with Romanian settlers once the invasion of the Soviet Union and the extermination of the Jewish and Romani population in the region was completed to formally annex it.

== See also ==
- The Holocaust in Romania
