= Izeaslav Levit =

Moldovan-American historian

Iziaslav Levit
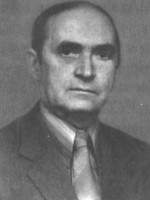
- Born: April 17, 1922; Chișinău, Lăpușna County, Romania (now Moldova)
- Died: February 13, 2021 (aged 98); Fort Lee, New Jersey, United States
- Known for: Studies on the history of Bessarabia, Holocaust under Romanian occupation
- Awards: State Prize of the Moldavian SSR (1972)

Academic background
- Education: Chișinău State Pedagogical Institute

Academic work
- Institutions: Academy of Sciences of Moldova
- Main interests: History of Moldova history of Romania history of Bulgaria; Holocaust in Romania history of the Jews in Moldova; Jewish studies

Iziaslav Elikovich Levit (Russian: Изясла́в Э́ликович Леви́т; Romanian: Izeaslav Elikovici Levit; also Israel Ilyich; April 17, 1922 – February 13, 2021) was a Soviet Moldovan and American historian, researcher and professor. He authored numerous works on the history of Bessarabia during Romanian administration and the Eastern Front, as well as on Romanian occupation policies in Transnistria, Bukovina and Bessarabia. He was a recipient of the State Prize of the Moldavian SSR (1972).

== Biography ==
In 1940, Levit graduated from the Romanian Bogdan Petriceicu Hașdeu Lyceum in Chișinău and entered the Chișinău Pedagogical Institute. On 6 July 1941, he was mobilized to the labour front to harvest in the Odessa region and later worked in a factory in Astrakhan. After the team was evacuated from the area, he continued his studies at the History Faculty of the Chișinău State Pedagogical Institute (now in Buguruslan). He later became a junior researcher at the Institute of History, Economics, Language and Literature of the Moldavian branch of the Academy of Sciences of the USSR (from 1961, the Academy of Sciences of Moldova).

During the anti-cosmopolitan campaign of 1948 and 1951, he was accused of attempting to whitewash the Romanian occupation authorities in Moldova during World War II.

In 1958, Levit defended his dissertation for the degree of Candidate of Historical Sciences. From 1957 to 1962, he served as academic secretary of the Institute of History of the Academy of Sciences of the Moldavian SSR. He became a doctor of history in 1983.

Between 1962 and 1987, he headed the Department of the History of Southeastern European Countries. From 1980 to 1987, he taught modern history at the Chișinău Pedagogical Institute. Beginning in 1991, he became chief researcher and head of the Department of Jewish History and Culture (Judaica) at the Institute for National Minorities of the Academy of Sciences of Moldova (later the Institute of Interethnic Relations).

From the mid-1990s, he lived in the United States (in Fort Lee, New Jersey), where he collaborated with the New York–based Yiddish newspaper Forverts.

He was the author of numerous scholarly and popular works on the modern history of Romania, Moldova, and Bessarabia, international relations, and World War II. From the early 1990s, he also focused on the history of the Holocaust in Romanian-occupied territories of Bessarabia, Bukovina, and Transnistria. He received the State Prize of the Moldavian SSR (1972) for co-authoring the two-volume History of the Moldavian SSR.

Levit’s most significant scholarly contributions were his late works on Bessarabia’s short-lived independence and the establishment of the Moldavian Democratic Republic in 1917–1918, including The Movement for the Autonomy of Bessarabia in 1917. The Formation of Sfatul Țării. Proclamation of the Moldavian Democratic Republic (1997) and the 500-page The Fateful Year. The Moldavian Republic: From the Proclamation of the Moldavian Republic to the Abolition of Bessarabian Autonomy (2000, both later translated into Romanian in 2003 and 2008). He also authored The Bessarabian Question in the Context of International Relations: The Paris Peace Conference (2012) and the two-volume The "Jewish Question" in the Politics of the Antonescu Dictatorship (2015, 2017).

He contributed to the encyclopedia project The Holocaust in the Territory of the USSR (Moscow: ROSSPEN, 2009 and 2011).

Levit was married to Inna Petrovskaya (from 1959) and had a son, Alexander (born 1961). He died on 11 February 2021, in Fort Lee, New Jersey.

== Views ==
Levit was known for his polemics with unionist historians. In his works, he argued strongly against the idea that the unification was wanted by the population of Bessarabia, regarding it as a military annexation by Romania. He argued that Moldovans are a distinct people from Romanians and that the union of Bessarabia with Romania was a military occupation, backed by a few pro-Romanian elites of the Moldavian Democratic Republic, not by the people of Bessarabia.

== Selected works ==
=== Monographs ===
- In the Fire of War the Friendship of Peoples Grew Strong (with A. A. Korenev). Chișinău: Cartea Moldovenească, 1969.
- The Moldavian SSR in the Great Patriotic War of the Soviet Union, 1941–1945 (with A. Afteniuk, D. Yelin, A. Korenev). Chișinău: Kartya Moldovenească, 1970.
- Soviet–Romanian Relations, 1929–1934: From the Signing of the Moscow Protocol to the Establishment of Diplomatic Relations (with Ya. M. Kopansky). Moscow: Nauka, 1971.
- Romania’s Foreign Policy and Romanian–Soviet Relations, September 1939 – June 1941 (with B. M. Kolker). Moscow: Nauka, 1971.
- Fascist Romania’s Participation in Aggression Against the USSR: Origins, Plans, Implementation (September 1, 1939 – November 19, 1942). Chișinău: Știința, 1981.
- The Collapse of the Aggressive Policy of the Antonescu Dictatorship (September 19, 1942 – March 23, 1944). Chișinău: Știința, 1983.
- Industry and the Working Class of the Moldavian SSR during the Great Patriotic War (with P. M. Shornikov). Chișinău: Știința, 1986.
- The Movement for the Autonomy of Bessarabia in 1917. The Formation of Sfatul Țării. Proclamation of the Moldavian Democratic Republic. Chișinău, 1997.
- Ashes of the Past Beat in Our Hearts: The Holocaust. Chișinău: Jewish Cultural Society of the Republic of Moldova, 1997.
- The Holocaust in Bessarabia in the Distorted Mirror of Mr. Anatol Petrencu. Chișinău: Antifascist Democratic Alliance of Moldova, 1999.
- The Fateful Year. From the Proclamation of the Moldavian Republic to the Abolition of Bessarabian Autonomy. November 1917 – November 1918. Chișinău: Central Typography, 2000.
- The Bessarabian Question in the Context of International Relations (1919–1920): The Paris Peace Conference. Tiraspol: Litera, 2012.
- Shoah – Holocaust – Catastrophe: The “Jewish Question” in the Politics of the Antonescu Dictatorship, Vols. 1–2. Tiraspol: Litera, 2015, 2017.

=== Edited collections ===
- The Moldavian SSR in the Great Patriotic War of the Soviet Union, 1941–1945: Collection of Documents and Materials in Two Volumes (compiler and co-editor). Chișinău: Știința, 1975.
- Problems of the History of Southeastern European Countries: Politics, Culture, Historiography. Chișinău: Știința, 1989.
- The Chișinău Pogrom of 1903: Collection of Documents and Materials. Chișinău: Liga, 1993.
- The Chișinău Pogrom of 1903: Collection of Documents and Materials (with K. L. Zhignya, Ya. M. Kopansky, E. D. Maksimenko). Chișinău: Ruxanda, 2000.
