= Tighina Agreement =

1941 treaty between Nazi Germany and Romania on the region of Transnistria

Romanian territory in May 1942

The Tighina Agreement (Romanian: Acordul de la Tighina; German: Tighiner Abkommen) was an agreement between Nazi Germany and Romania about administration, economy and security issues of the Transnistria Governorate that entered into force on 30 August 1941. It was signed during World War II, while the Axis invasion of the Soviet Union was taking place. The Tiraspol Agreement through which Romania received the region had entered in force shortly before, on 19 August.

Discussions to make an agreement began on 17 August, and they were concluded by the German General Arthur Hauffe and the Romanian General Nicolae Tătăranu in the city of Tighina (now Bender, Moldova, under Transnistrian control). Before the agreement, the region had remained under German military occupation. Furthermore, it was agreed that until military operations ended, Romania could not evacuate its Jews east of the Southern Bug (that is, to lands under German control, as the river marked the eastern boundary of Transnistria). Therefore, they were to be placed under labor camps until then. This is probably because of the inability of the German Einsatzgruppe D to deal with all of the Jews, as it functioned over a very large area and would not be able to handle a flooding of Jews coming from Romania into its lands of operation.

The agreement also allowed the German army to establish naval and air bases in Transnistria and periodically enter the region to perform "special jobs", referring to actions against its Jewish population. Transnistria would later become the destination of many Jews from the recently recovered Northern Bukovina and Bessarabia. Ion Antonescu, Conducător (leader) of Romania, planned to colonize Transnistria with Romanian settlers once the invasion of the Soviet Union and the extermination of the Jewish and Romani population in the region was completed to formally annex it. The agreement had 9 articles.

== See also ==
- The Holocaust in Romania
