= Heydebreck-Cosel =

Area containing Nazi Germany concentration camps

Heydebreck
- Part of Auschwitz III-Monowitz
- Located in Upper Silesia
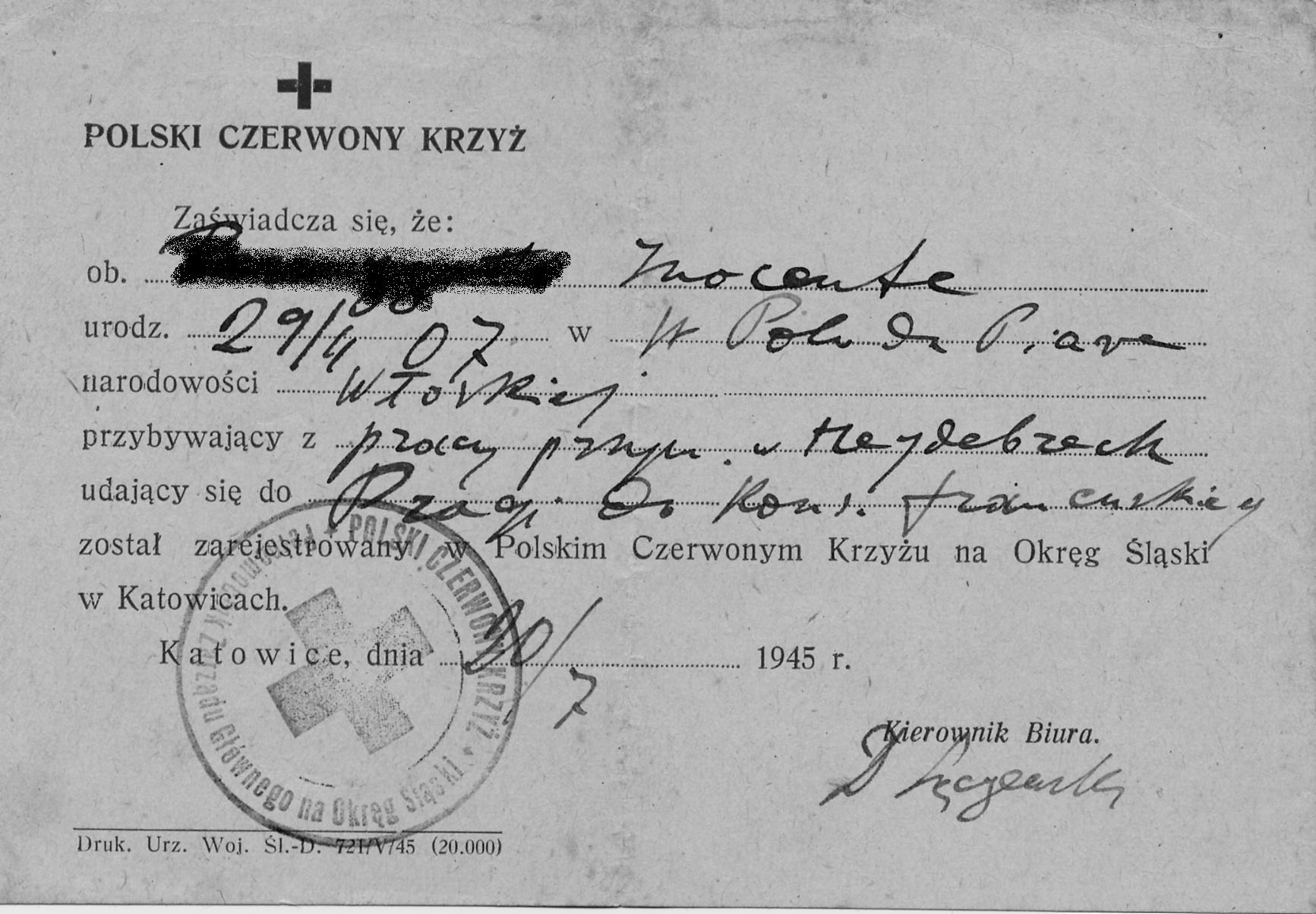
- 1945 Heydebreck card

Site history
- Battles/wars: Oil Campaign of World War II
- Events: 1945-01: Soviet occupation Post-war: Area recovered by Poland

Heydebreck was a Nazi Germany village area with POW camps Arbeitskommando E711A and Bau und Arbeits (BAB, English: Building and Labor) camp 20 (renamed E794 in November 1944). Five km west in the Cosel district was a subcamp of Auschwitz III (Monowitz) operated from April 1, 1944, to January 26, 1945. In February and March 1944, 800 POWs from Monowitz Arbeitskommando E715 were transferred to chemical facilities in the area of Blechhammer, Cosel, and Heydebreck.

Heydebreck chemical facilities included a Bergius hydrogenation plant (3300 tons/month), a Kybol plant, a Methanol plant, a Nitrogen plant, a Butanol plant, an Oppanol plant, and (as at Oppau) a Tanol plant. As a target of the Oil Campaign of World War II, Heydebreck was first bombed in June 1944.

A shooting of British POWs at Heydebreck was studied post-war.

External image
- Map distinguishing Cosel, Heydebreck, & Blechhammer

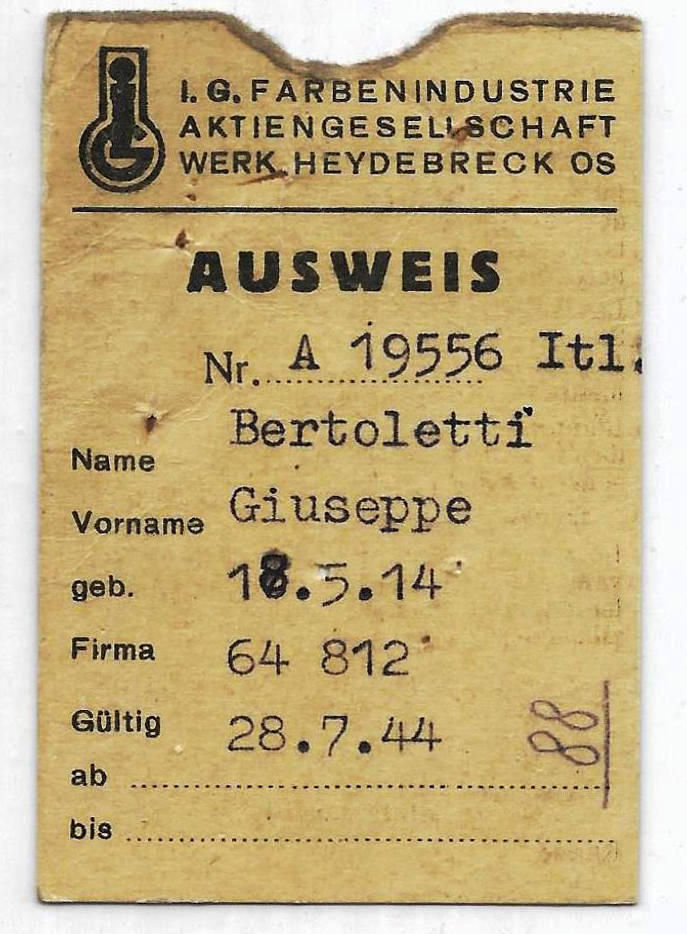
I.G. Farben Heydebreck ID issued to an Italian POW.
