= Compulsory labor of the Jews in Romania =

The regime of the compulsory labor of the Jews in Romania (Romanian: Munca obligatorie a evreilor) existed during 1940-1944.

Forced labor for the Jews existed during World War II in Nazi-occupied areas, as well as in the countries allied with the Nazi Germany.

As an element of anti-Jewish legislation in Romania, on December 4, 1940, Decree-Law No. 3984 (Decretul-lege relativ la statutul militar al evreilor) excluded the Jews from the military service. In lieu of that they had to pay a special tax and were subject to compulsory labor. They had to work at their place of residence (or place of evacuation) or in special internment camps. This labor was regulated by the May 14, 1941, Decree-Law No. 1403, "On the organization of national labor", and the November 14, 1941, Decree-Law "On the establishment of the General Inspectorate of Labor Camps and Columns".

Most Jews were ordered to work in their own town or city, but groups were also selected to perform heavy labour tasks such as building railway tracks. Labour camps generally lacked medical facilities and had poor or non-existent hygiene facilities. Survivors of such labour camps reported they were made to work from sunrise to sunset with a half-hour break, six days a week.

Official reports counted 84,042 Jews, aged eighteen to fifty, in the recruitment centres. Cases where those forced to work for the state could not perform the task and could not pay a tax to exempt them from forced labour, or if they somehow failed to show up, were punishable with deportation.

While the Jews were excluded from the military service, Jewish doctors, pharmacists, veterinarians, engineers and architects could be requisitioned to work for the armed forces (Decizia Ministerului Apărării Naţionale nr.23 325 din 27 ianuarie 1941), however their uniforms had to bear signs indicative of their Jewish ethnicity (Regulamentul asupra Decretului-lege relativ la Statutul Militar al Evreilor).

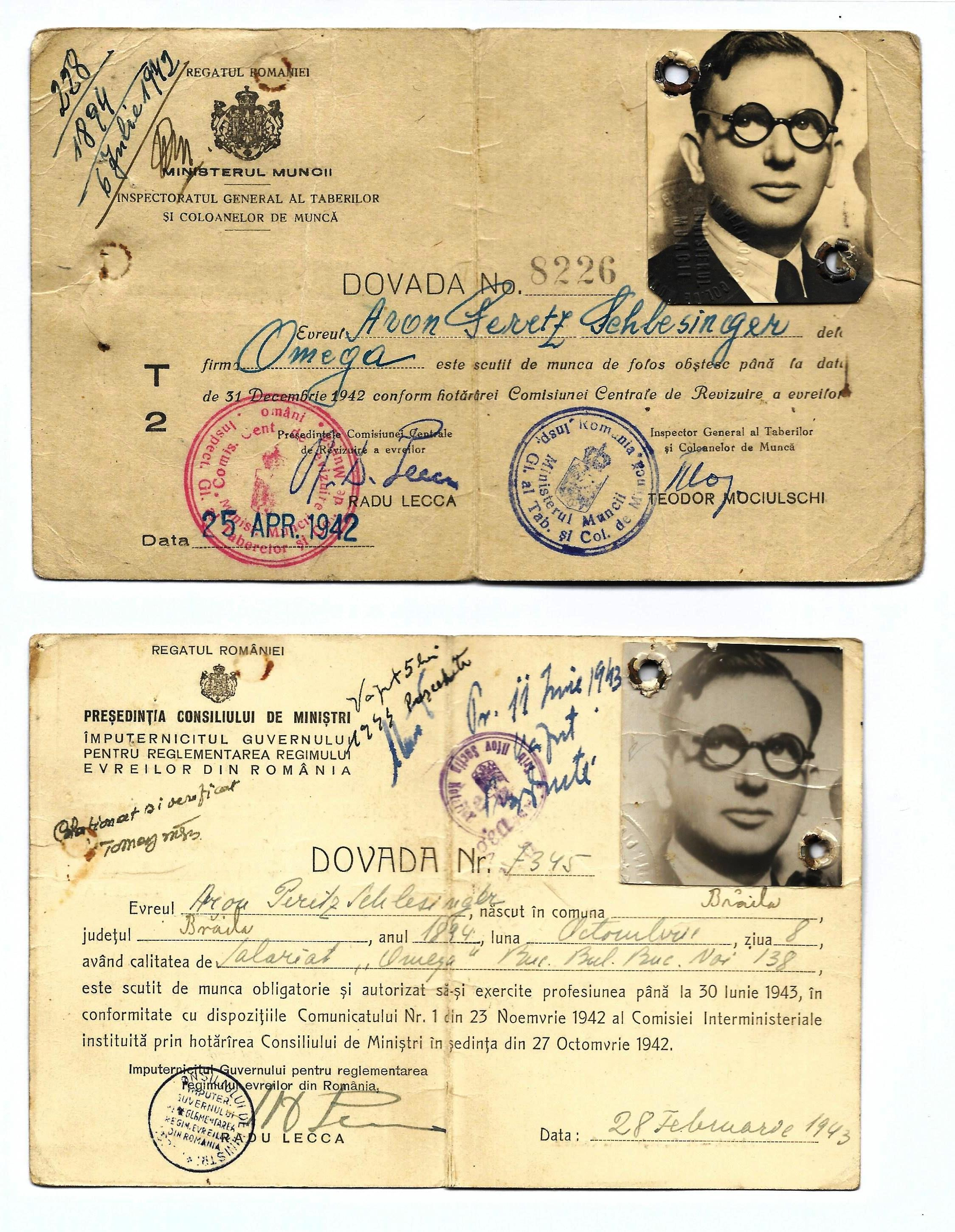
Romania issued special IDs for Jews exempt from the compulsory labor

Some number of Jews were exempt from the compulsory labor.

== See also ==
- The Holocaust in Romania
- Forced labor in Nazi concentration camps
- Forced labour under German rule during World War II
