= The Holocaust in Romania =

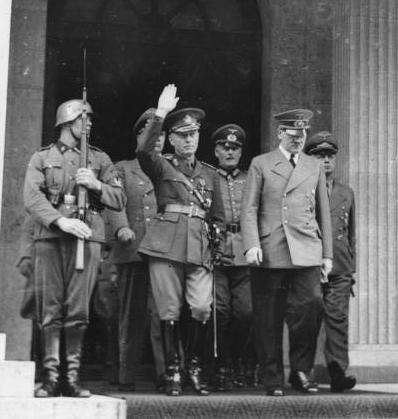
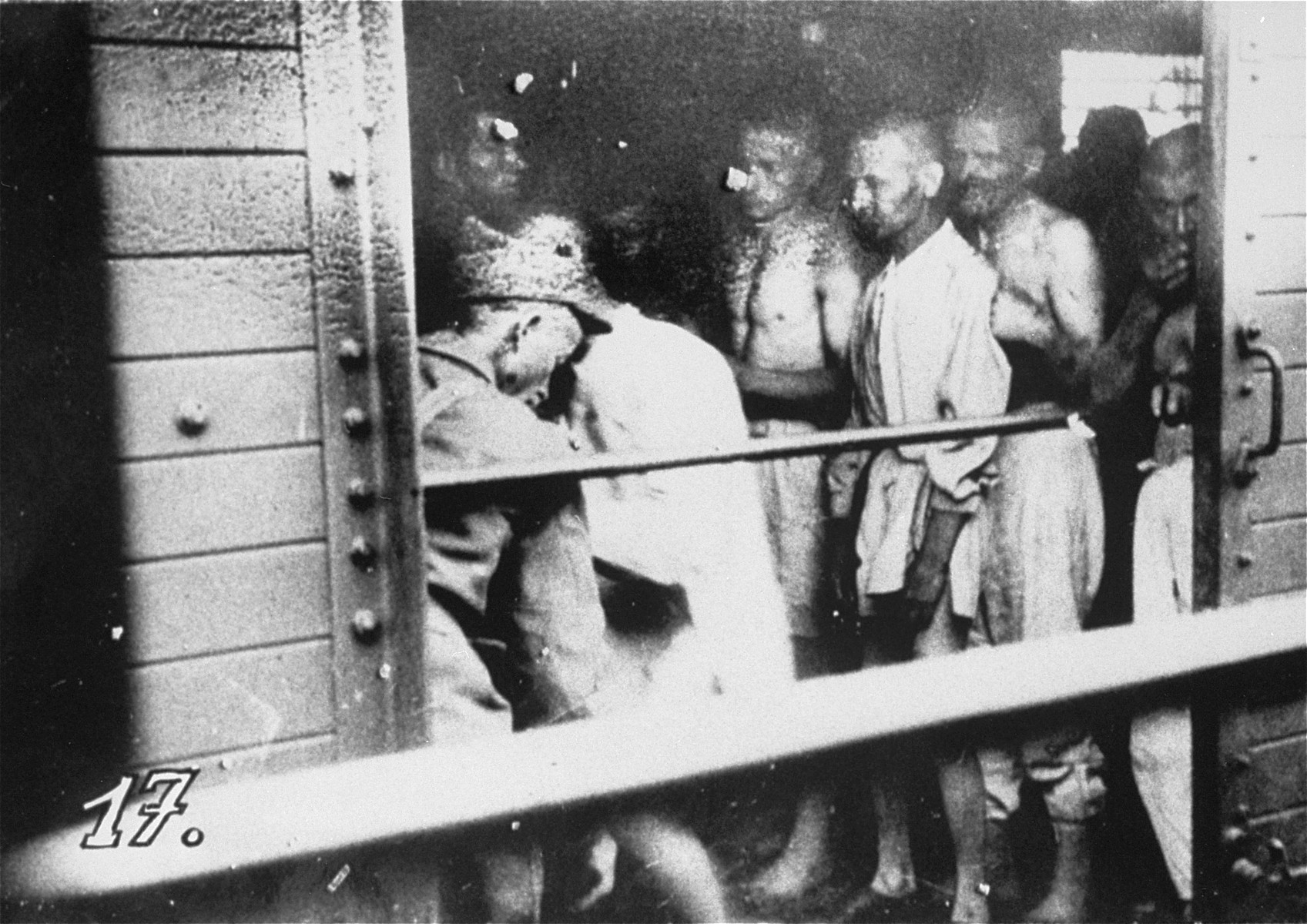
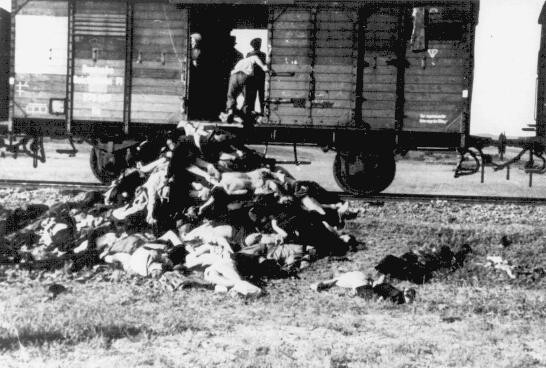
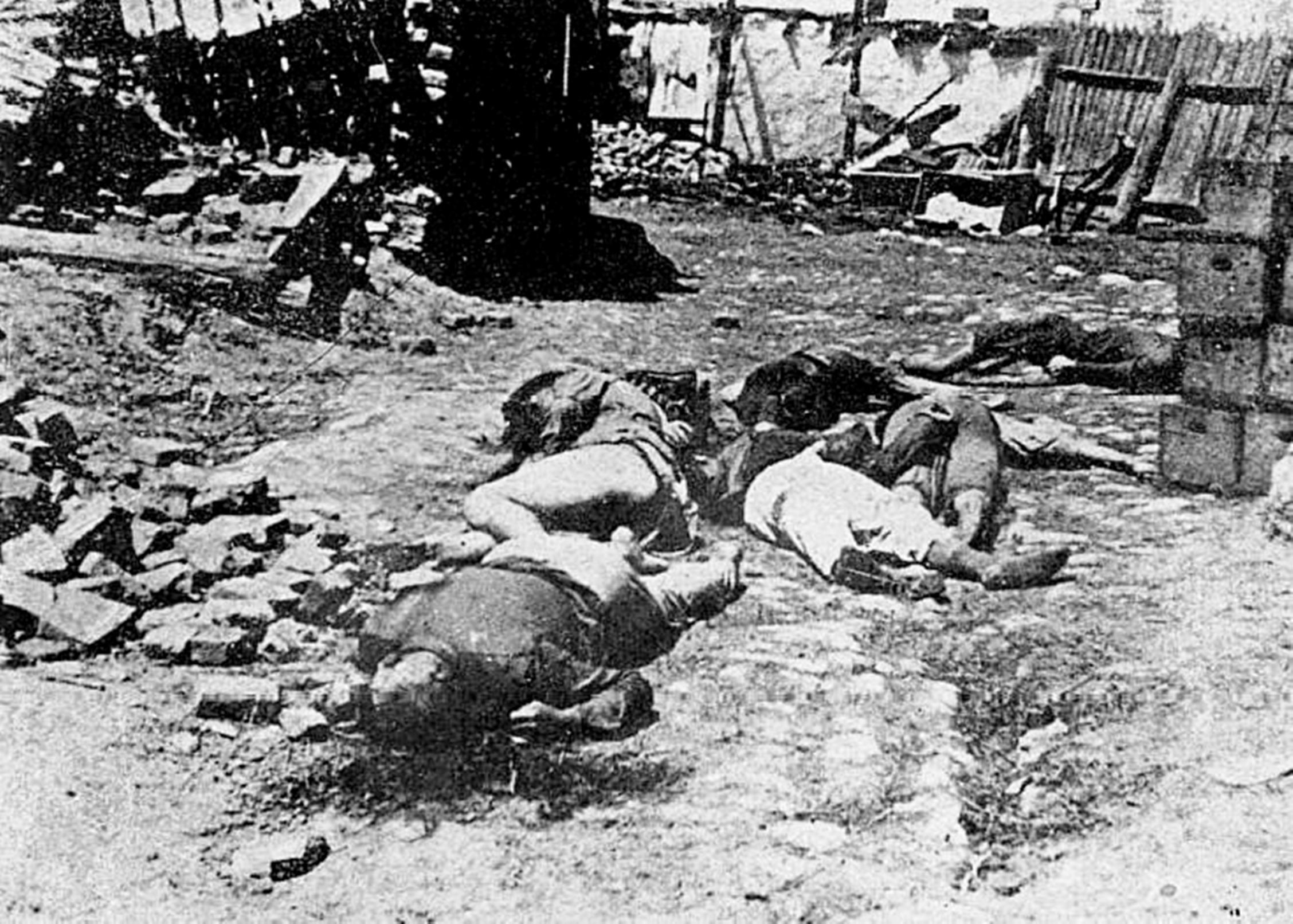
- From the top and left to right: Ion Antonescu with Adolf Hitler • Romanian military physicians examine Jews during the stop of the Iași-Călărași death train in Săbăoani, 1941 • Bodies being thrown down from a train carrying deported Jews from Iași, 1941 • Murder of Jews by a military convoy between Bârzula and Grozdovca, 1941 • Deportation of Jews to Transnistria across Dniester, 1942

Overview
- Period: 1941–1944
- Territory: Kingdom of Romania, Transnistria Governorate
- Perpetrators: Kingdom of Romania, Iron Guard, civilian mobs, and Nazi Germany
- Killed: 250,000–380,000 Jews

The Holocaust saw the genocide of Jews in the Kingdom of Romania and in Romanian-controlled territories of the Soviet Union between 1940 and 1944. While historically part of The Holocaust, these actions were mostly independent from the similar acts committed by Nazi Germany, Romania being the only ally of the Third Reich that carried out a genocidal campaign without the intervention of Heinrich Himmler's SS. Various numbers have been advanced by researchers for the lives lost in the genocide, with most estimates in the range of 250,000 to 380,000. In Romanian-occupied Moldova specifically, between 176,000 and 179,000 Jews were murdered in the Holocaust, according to Yitzhak Arad. Another approximately 132,000 Jews from the Hungarian-controlled Northern Transylvania were killed during this period by the Nazis with the collaboration of the Hungarian authorities. Romania ranks first among Holocaust perpetrator countries other than Germany, though Romania also had more Jewish Holocaust survivors at the end of World War II than any other Axis country, thus producing what is described as the Antonescu Paradox, where Romanian Conducator Ion Antonescu was extraordinarily brutal, murderous, and genocidal towards the Jews outside of the borders of the Romanian Old Kingdom while being brutal but less murderous and genocidal towards the Jews within the borders of the Romanian Old Kingdom.

== Background ==
In the first decades of the 20th century, antisemitic views increased in number and intensity in publications and writings of prominent Romanian figures such as A.C. Cuza, Nichifor Crainic, Nicolae Iorga, Nicolae Paulescu and Ion Găvănescu. Among the main political organisations that took these ideas and built them into an open attack on the Jewish community in Romania was the Iron Guard. Formerly a small political group under the name "Guard of National Conscience," the movement gained in its ranks in 1920 Corneliu Zelea Codreanu. Divisions and disagreements within the group and between members led Corneliu and others to leave and form the Legion of Archangel Michael in 1927, and then in 1930 the Iron Guard was created as an organisation to unite it with other nationalist groups. Despite renaming the organisation several times, in the media and public eyes the image and name of "Legionaries" and "Iron Guard" stuck for the anti-communist, antisemitic, and fascist movement.

Antisemitism was also popularised and promoted by important cultural personalities of the interwar period such as Nae Ionescu, Mircea Eliade, Emil Cioran, and Constantin Noica and endorsed by the Romanian Orthodox Church. (Note: "The Romanian Orthodox Church defined its attitude toward Jews prior to June 1941, the start of the war against the USSR. In 1937, almost one year before the law for the revision of citizenship was passed, the Church openly expressed its support for such measures. Patriarch Cristea, as prime minister of the country, implemented a strong anti-Semitic program as a result of which many Romanian Jews were stripped of their Romanian citizenship and marginalized."(Popa 2017, p. 41.).)

=== Antisemitic legislation ===
At the end of 1937, the government of Octavian Goga came to power; Romania thus became the second overtly-antisemitic state in Europe. Goga's government issued Decree-law no. 169 of 22 January 1938, which invalidated the citizenship which Jews had obtained at the beginning of World War I, and required all Jews who lived in Romania to present their documentation for review. A total of 225,222 Jews lost their citizenship as a result of the law, and many more found themselves out of their jobs and deprived of political rights. Romania was the second country which enacted antisemitic legislation in Europe, after Nazi Germany, and the only country which did so before the 1938 Anschluss, or German annexation of Austria. and the only country other than Germany itself which "implemented all the steps of the destruction process, from definitions to killings." The antisemitic legislation was not an attempt to placate the Germans, but rather entirely home-grown, preceding German hegemony, and even Nazi Germany itself. The ascendance of Germany enabled Romania to disregard the minorities treaties that were imposed upon the country after the First World War. The legislation in Romania was usually aimed at exploiting Jews rather than humiliating them as in Germany.

As a result of such anti-Semitic laws, hundreds of Jewish families, mostly but not entirely from Bessarabia, applied to the Italian consulate for visas to Italian-occupied Ethiopia.

== Pogroms and forced labour ==
The first acts of violence against Romanian Jews started after the loss of Bessarabia and Northern Bukovina to the Soviet Union in mid-1940. Romanian troops used the Jews who lived in these regions as scapegoats for their frustration, accusing some of them of collaborating with the Soviets. Major Vasile Carp, commander of the 86th Mountain Regiment, ordered the execution of several Jews in Ciudei and Zăhănești soon after the enforcement of the Soviet ultimatum. Similar acts took place in Comănești and Coștina. Violence against Jews increased in public places and on transportation. Jewish soldiers were frequently expelled from their units, attacked, and even murdered. Retreating Romanian military personnel clashed with Soviet soldiers near Hertsa in July 1940, and the situation escalated into the Dorohoi pogrom, during which anywhere between 50 and 200 Jews where murdered. Even more casualties resulted after the army opened fire on civilian refugees in the city of Galați, with hundreds of dead, most of them Jews. Overall, several hundred, or even thousands, of Jews were killed in the aftermath of this territory loss.

=== Bucharest pogrom ===
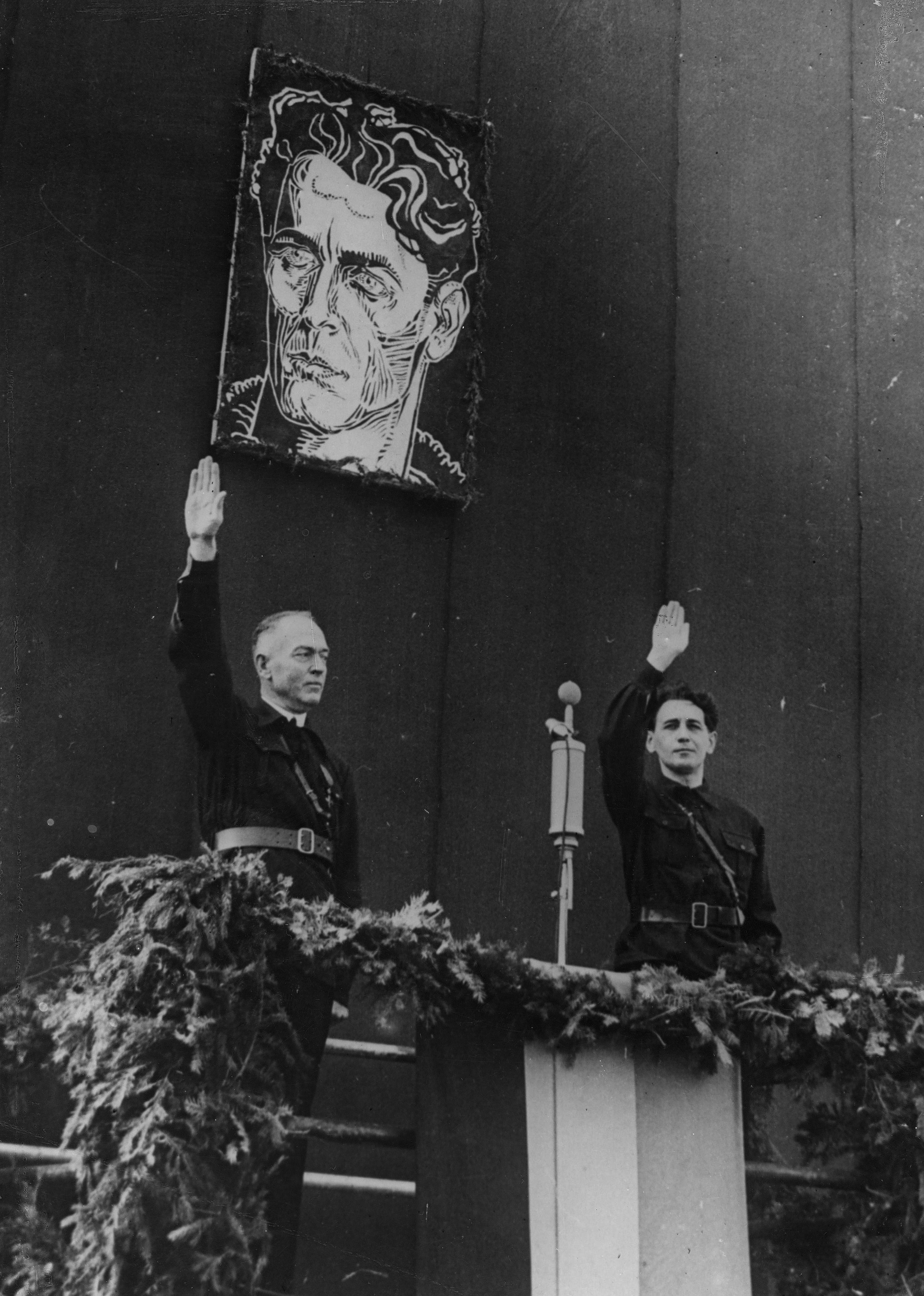
Ion Antonescu and Horia Sima, the leaders of the National Legionary State, October 1940

In September 1940, the Iron Guard became a part of the National Legionary government, a structure that had Antonescu as the absolute leader, or the Conducător. Almost immediately, acts of antisemitism increased, legitimized by the establishment of a Legionary Police force that was modelled after Nazi paramilitary units and the establishment of militia-type groups such as Corpul Muncitoresc Legionar. In October, the Legion started an organized campaign of expropriation and deportation against Jews from rural areas. Many of the victims moved to the capital in the hope that they would be able to live with their relatives or friends; in cities which were controlled by Legionnaires, such as Câmpulung Moldovenesc, widespread pillaging of properties owned by Jews ensued, frequently accompanied by beatings, humiliations, and threats, such as in the case of Câmpulung Moldovenesc' rabbi, Iosef Rubin, who was tortured and then forced to pull a wagon which his son was forced to drive.

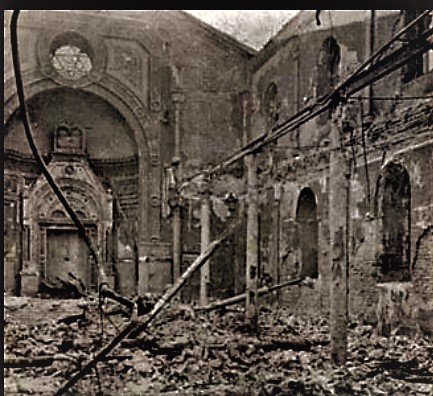
Grand Spanish Temple in Bucharest after it was set on fire during the pogrom

These actions were exported on a large scale to Bucharest from December of the same year. In January 1941, Legionnaires occupied the Bucharest Police headquarters and other public buildings. Almost 2,000 Jews were detained or arrested, and violence erupted in full on 22 January after the minister of the interior ordered the burning of Jewish districts. 125 Jews were killed between 21 and 23 January, with 90 of them stripped naked and shot in the forest near Jilava. Rape, torture, and mutilation were standard practices among the perpetrators. All of the synagogues were attacked and vandalized, and the Grand Spanish Temple, once considered the most beautiful building of its type in the city, was burnt to ruins.

The pogrom destroyed 1,274 buildings, and after the army ended it on 23 January, it found 200 trucks loaded with jewels and cash.

=== Iași pogrom and the Death Trains ===
Even though Antonescu and the army played a central role in suppressing the Iron Guard, the regime instituted by the marshal continued the same antisemitic policies started by the Legionnaires. The evacuation of the Jews from small towns and villages became a fundamental part of what was known as the "cleansing of the land" - the removal of all "Jewish elements" from Romanian society. In Moldavia, where a large part of the Jews in Romania lived and where many of the Jews from occupied Bessarabia and Northern Bucovina sought refuge, four hundred and forty-one villages and small towns were "cleansed" by July 1941. The destination for the people gathered in the ghettos of the larger cities was set to be southern Romania, mainly Târgu Jiu. Approximately 45,000 Jews, both locals and those from the countryside, lived in Iași in June 1941 when the order came to "cleanse the city".

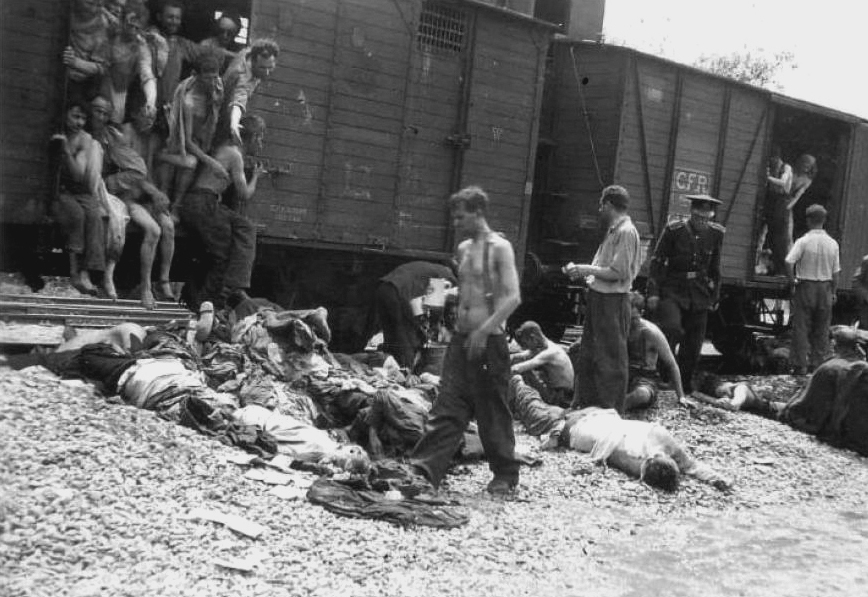
Bodies being thrown down from a train carrying deported Jews from Iași

On the evening of the next day, 28 June 1941, army groups, the local police, gendarmes, German soldiers attached to the Romanian army, and ad-hoc mobs incited by the media and the secret services descended upon the Jewish population of the city which was accused to have pro-Soviet sympathies, had armed itself and was attacking the army, and even had signalled enemy planes where to attack. At 9 pm, shots were heard throughout the city and pillaging, rape, and murder of the Jews started. On 29 June the survivors were taken to the train stations, having to walk through the streets filled with dead bodies. There, they were forced into train cargo wagons. In the heat of the summer, with no water or food, and crammed against each other, most of them died before reaching the destination. A survivor recalled:

During the night some of us went mad and started to yell, bite, and jostle violently; you had to fight them, as they could take your life; in the morning, many of us were dead and the bodies were left inside; they refused to give water even to our crying children, whom we were holding above our heads.

From the train that left for Călărași, only 1,011 people survived the seven-day journey out of about 5,000. From the train that went to Podu Iloaiei, which is 15 km away from the city, 2,000 of the 2,700 people died. In total, the massacre started in Iași had up to 14,850 victims.

=== Forced labour ===
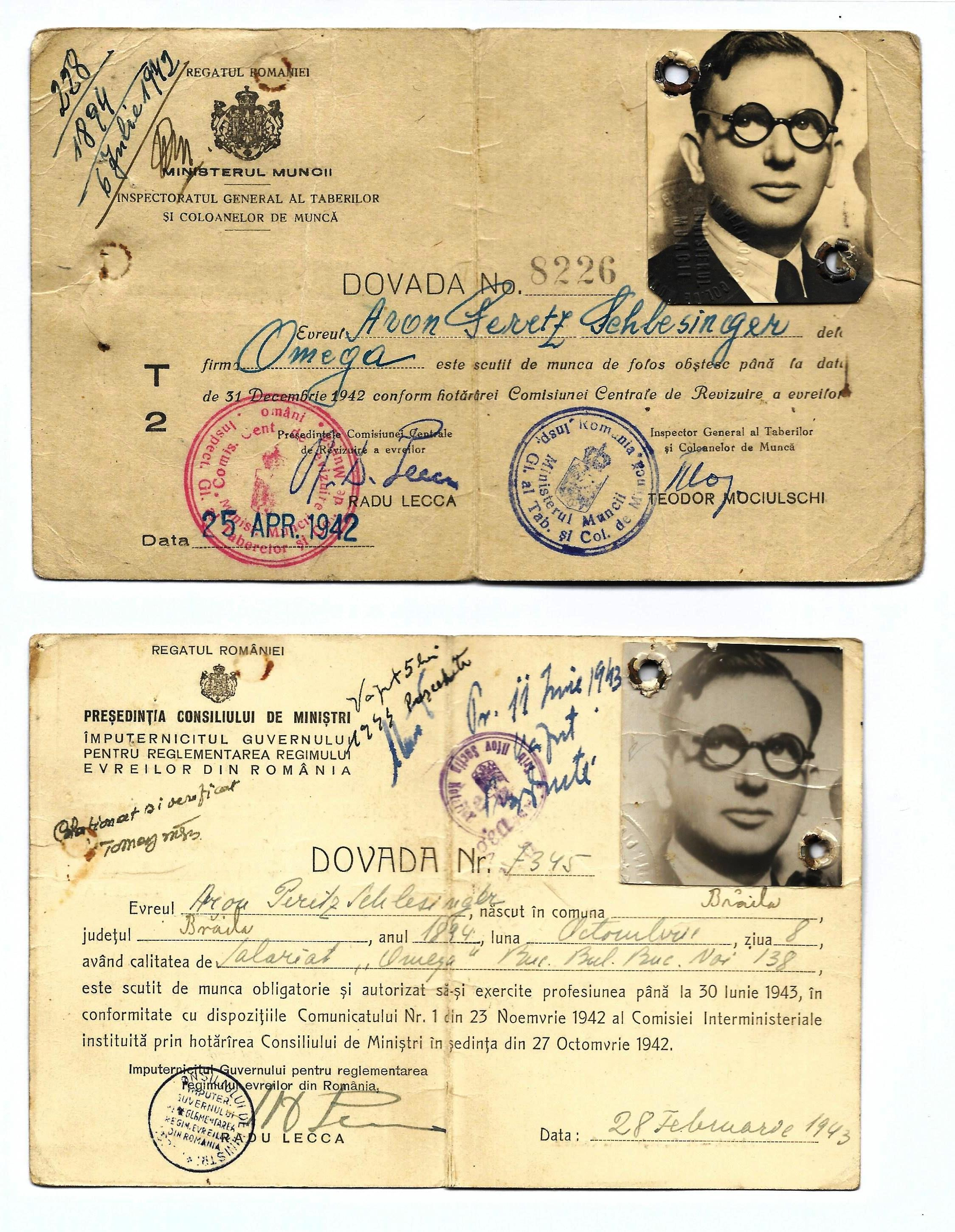
Romania issued special IDs for the Jews exempt from the compulsory labor

As with the pogroms, Antonescu's regime continued the policy of forced labour started during the collaboration with the Iron Guard. The laws adopted in September 1940 that, in broad terms, excluded Jews from public functions and limited their fields of work, was supplemented in November with a communiqué from Antonescu that stipulated that Jews would not be allowed in the army and instead would have to pay a special tax. Those who could not pay the tax were put to labour instead. The measure changed the nature of forced labour from a local antisemitic action to a method of systematic government persecution. Most Jews were ordered to work in their own town or city, but groups were also selected to perform heavy labour tasks such as building railway tracks. Labour camps generally lacked medical facilities and had poor or non-existent hygiene facilities. Survivors of such labour camps reported they were made to work from sunrise to sunset with a half-hour break, six days a week.

A Law-Decree was further released in August 1941, which institutionalized forced labour as a state instrument. Official reports counted 84,042 Jews, aged eighteen to fifty, in the recruitment centres. Cases where those forced to work for the state could not perform the task and could not pay a tax to exempt them from forced labour, or if they somehow failed to show up, were punishable with deportation.

== The Holocaust in Bukovina, Bessarabia, and Transnistria ==
On 22 June 1941, German armies, with significant Romanian support invaded the Soviet Union. German and Romanian units conquered Bessarabia, Odesa, and Sevastopol, then marched east and south across the Russian steppes toward Stalingrad. Romanians welcomed the war because it allowed them to retake lands annexed by the Soviet Union a year prior. Hitler rewarded Romania's loyalty by returning Bessarabia and northern Bukovina, and by allowing it to administer the conquered Soviet lands between the Dniester and Bug Rivers, including Odessa and Nikolaev. Anticipating a German victory, and in accordance with the discussions carried on since March 1941 with their Nazi allies, Romanian authorities began to implement the policy of "cleansing of the land" in Bessarabia and Bukovina, which the Romanian deputy Prime Minister, Mihai Antonescu, summarized in a speech during a government meeting:

At the risk of not being understood by traditionalists... I am all for the forced migration of the entire Jewish element of Bessarabia and Bukovina, which must be dumped across the border... You must be merciless to them... I don't know how many centuries will pass before the Romanian people meet again with such total liberty of action, such opportunity for ethnic cleansing and national revision... This is a time when we are masters of our land. Let us use it. If necessary, shoot your machine guns. I couldn't care less if history will recall us as barbarians... I take formal responsibility and tell you there is no law... So, no formalities, complete freedom.

In parallel with the offensive across the Prut River known as Operation München, as the Iași pogrom unfolded and similar actions took place in Roman, Fălticeni, and Galați, the Romanian army and gendarmerie, with the aid of the German Einsatzgruppe D, began implementing the genocide in frontline areas. The first killings were done in Bukovina, at Siret, Chudei, and the vicinity. The Jews from Siret were forced to march on foot to Dornești, with those too old or who were crippled being killed. In Chudei, 450 Jews were shot on 3 July 1941, and afterwards, with the complicity of local Romanians and Ukrainians, the killing area was expanded to the neighbouring villages. At Hertsa, on 5 July, 1,500 Jews were forcefully removed from their homes and held in the four synagogues and a cellar. Groups were selected the next day and shot, and the Jewish women and girls were separated and raped. The survivors were later deported.

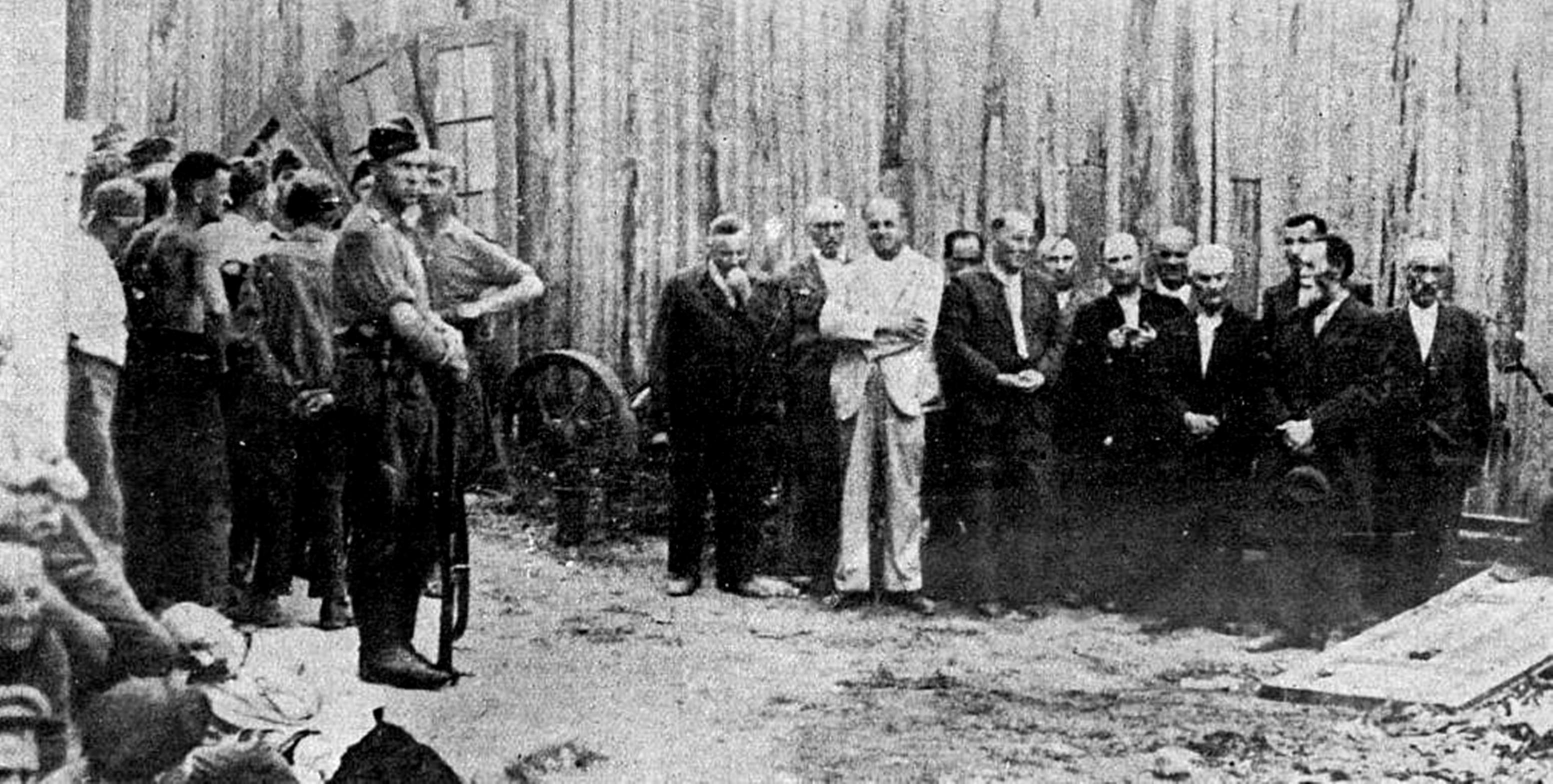
Last meeting of the Jewish Community leaders from Bălți, one hour before their execution, 15 July 1941.

In Bessarabia, on 6 July, approximately 500 Jews were killed at Edineț, and almost 1,000 were killed at Novoselytsia around the same time. The killing spree expanded to Briceni, Lipcani, Fălești, Mărculești, and Gura Căinarului, where thousands were shot by 8 July. By 11 July, Einsatzgruppe D started operating in Bălți, one of the largest cities of Bessarabia. The peak of the slaughter was reached by 17 July when possibly as many as 10,000 Jews were killed in one day. As the army moved further south, the Jews of Cetatea Albă, some 5,000 people in total, fled en masse. Those who stayed behind, approximately 500, were killed by the advancing army.

Along with the army, the gendarmes worked to round up Jews and execute them in the recovered territories with the cooperation of local informants. Despite the continuous support from the Germans in the "cleansing the land," the gendarmes faced difficulties dealing with the aftermath of the killing, especially the bodies, which was considered "dirty work", as opposed to the "clean work" of killing. A report of a German attaché drew attention on the matter even before the military operations started on the Eastern Front:

The way in which the Romanians are dealing with the Jews lacks any method. No objections could be raised against the numerous executions of Jews, but the technical preparations and the executions themselves were totally inadequate. The Romanians usually left the victims' bodies where they were shot, without trying to bury them. The Einsatzkommandos issued instructions to the Romanian police to proceed somewhat more systematically in this matter.

During the fighting across Bukovina and Bessarabia, the Romanians were praised for their effectiveness in "cleansing the land" by the Germans, but were criticized for failures to remove all traces of the genocide. For this reason, many of the executions were committed near a river, the bodies then being thrown in the water.

=== Ghettos and deportations ===
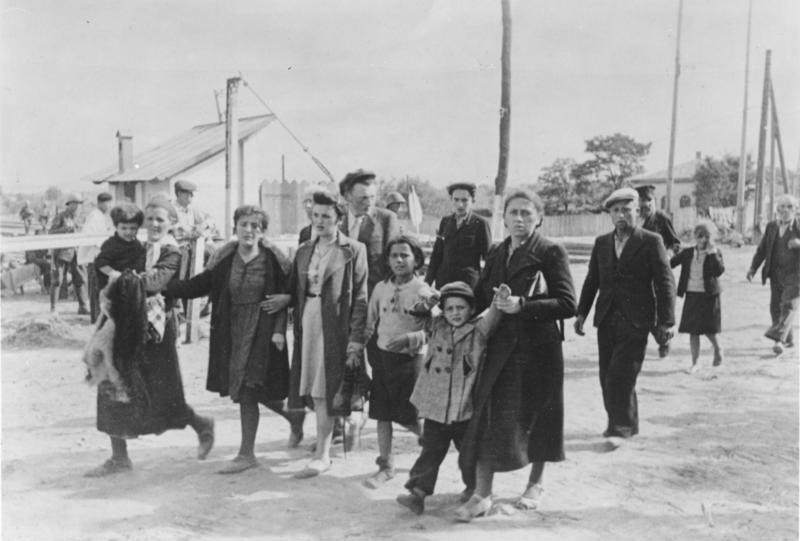
Arrested Jews in Chișinău

Like in the Old Kingdom, the surviving Jewish population was largely displaced from rural areas, Romanian villages being seen as the "core of Romanianness" that had to be cleansed of foreign elements, with the Jews initially relocated to the towns and cities. As per the plan presented earlier, the Romanian authorities did not want to set up permanent living spaces for the Jews, but gather them and send them across the border, which by mid 1941 was the river Dniester. Convoys of Jews from Bukovina and northern Bessarabia were marched towards the river, and makeshift camps were set up on the banks at Kozliv, Yampil, and Vertiujeni. Hasty deportations were attempted across the border to the territory between the Dniester and the Southern Bug, which was then occupied by the Germans. Some deportees groups were forced into the river and those trying to get back to the Romanian side were shot. A group of about 30,000 was marched alongside the river and then to the Ukrainian part. At stops, people were selected from the group and executed. The 20,000 or fewer survivors were then returned to the Romanian side.

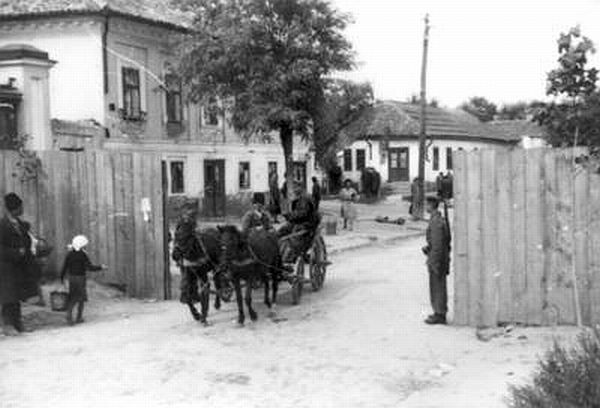
One of the two checkpoints in Chisinau ghetto, 1941

The lack of communication between the Germans and Romanians, and the state of confusion regarding how to deal with the Jews in Bessarabia - mainly due to Romanian authorities' attempts to cover up the genocide by avoiding to give written orders - was addressed by Bessarabia's governor, General Constantin Voiculescu, who set up ghettos, and by the Tighina Agreement between Antonescu and Hitler which allowed the transfer of the region between Dniester and Southern Bug to Romania, known since then as Transnistria. Large camps and ghettos were set up at Chișinău, Sokyriany, Edineț, Limbenii Noi, Rășcani, Răuțel, Vertujeni, and Mărculești, with smaller ones in other locations. A total of 75-80,000 Jewish survivors were forced into these places, representing less than half of the pre-war Jewish population of Bessarabia. In Bukovina, the measure of rounding up Jews in ghettos was not implemented, and entire communities were marched mainly towards Storozhynets and Otaci and further on to the ghetto in Mohyliv-Podilskyi, from where many ended up in the Pechora concentration camp. From Chernivtsi alone, 28,000 people were deported; 20,000 were saved by the mayor of the city, who pled their case as essential for the city's economy.

=== Transnistria ===
A Soviet census two years prior to the Tighina Agreement claimed that as many as three million people lived in the region between the Dniester and Southern Bug Rivers, out of which approximately 330,000 were Jews. As the German and Romanian armies advanced, many of the Jews retreated with the Soviet army. Nevertheless, large numbers stayed behind with up to 90,000 living in the yet-unoccupied district of Odesa. In addition, another 108,000 Jews from Bukovina and Bessarabia had been deported to the region by order of Antonescu in the last months of 1941. A total of 16 camps and 75 ghettos were established in Transnistria, the main locations being Mytky, Pechera, and Rohizka in Vinnytsia Oblast, Obodivka, Balanivka, Bobrik, Kryve Ozero, and Bogdanovka.

The concentration camps did not have enough enclosed spaces for the people forced to live in them, and were poorly provisioned with supplies, which led to the deaths of many people by hypothermia or starvation.

When Jews arrived in Transnistria, they found the area ravaged by war. Many towns and villages in which ghettos had been established bore the marks of bombardment, and often Jews were placed in half-destroyed houses that were open to the elements and lacking sanitation. Ragged, dirty, and hungry, and having spent what money they had to buy food in order to survive the ordeal of deportation, they presented a woeful sight to the local population. Their weak physical condition made them even more vulnerable to endemic typhus. Survivors’ accounts relate the appalling conditions against which they struggled. Adults were often only half-dressed, while children wore rags since they had sold their clothing for bread.

Typhus epidemics broke out frequently, and in the absence of medical care, they became deadly. At Bogdanovka, where about 54,000 people were concentrated, an epidemic broke out in December 1941. The prefect, Lieutenant Colonel Modest Isopescu, reported the situation to his superiors, noting that "Those in Vazdovka were hit by typhus and about 8,000 died." The decision was made to contain the disease by killing those affected, and the mass-murder of the inmates was ordered in the second half of the month. The action was carried out mainly by shooting, the Romanian soldiers being aided by collaborationist Ukrainian police. In addition, 5,000 Jews were gathered in two stables, which were set on fire. By the end of the month, almost the entire population of the camp was dead. A survivor recalled:

We would make piles for burning the corpses. One layer of straw, on which we placed people [in a space] about four meters wide, more than one man high, and about ten meters long. On the sides and in the middle we put firewood, and then again one layer of people and a layer of straw with firewood. We would light one pile and prepare another, so it took about two months to turn our brothers to ashes. In terrible frosts we would warm up by the hot ashes.

Another major detention site was the Vapniarka concentration camp, which from 1942 held Jewish political prisoners deported from Romania. In September 1942 nearly 1,200 Jews classified by the Romanian authorities as communists, communist sympathizers or otherwise politically suspect were deported there. Prisoners were subjected to severe deprivation, including being fed fodder peas that caused paralysis and other neurological illness.

When Vapniarka was closed as the Red Army approached in late 1943, the prisoners were dispersed. Fifty-four communist prisoners were transferred to the prison at Rîbnița, where German SS personnel killed them during the Rîbnița massacre of 19–20 March 1944. Yad Vashem records that, after Romanian forces withdrew from Rîbnița and transferred control to German forces, more than 200 prisoners in the local prison, including many Jews, were executed.

The majority of the remaining Vapniarka political prisoners, 565 people, were transferred to Grosulovo, where they remained under the command of Romanian gendarmerie officer Sabin Motora. As Romanian and German forces retreated from Transnistria in 1944, Motora helped evacuate the prisoners westward toward Romania rather than surrendering them to German forces. Most were eventually returned to Romania and interned at Târgu Jiu. The International Commission on the Holocaust in Romania later cited Motora as an example of an individual Romanian official who acted to rescue Jews, and Yad Vashem posthumously recognized him as Righteous Among the Nations in 1983.

== Romania and The Holocaust ==
The "wholesale slaughter of Jews" in Romanian-occupied Soviet territories was "a genocide operationally separate from the Nazi Final Solution". Romania also rejected Nazi designs on its Jews, ultimately declining to deport Romanian Jews to the Belzec concentration camp. Romania even took the lead in the Holocaust during the first weeks of Operation Barbarossa. This fact was acknowledged by Adolf Hitler on 19 August 1941: "As far as the Jewish Question is concerned, it can now be stated with certainty that a man like Antonescu is pursuing much more radical policies in this area than we have so far." The regime of Ion Antonescu had been killing Jewish women and children, clearing entire Jewish communities, while Nazi Germany was still massacring only Jewish men.

== See also ==
- Antisemitism in Romania
- Deportations of Romani people to Transnistria
- History of the Jews in Romania
- Post-World War II Romanian war crime trials
- History of the Jews in Chișinău
- History of the Jews in Chernivtsi
- History of the Jews in Romania
- History of the Jews in Transnistria
- History of the Jews in Ukraine
- History of the Jews in Bessarabia
- History of the Jews in Bukovina
- Bogdanovka concentration camp
- Shargorod
- Mohyliv-Podilskyi
- Domanivka
- Izeaslav Levit
- Vladimir Solonari
- Grosulovo concentration camp
- Rîbnița massacre
- Sabin Motora
- Vapniarka concentration camp
