= Blechhammer concentration camp =

Nazi concentration camp, part of Auschwitz

Coordinates: 50°21′32″N 18°19′7″E

Blechhammer
- subcamp
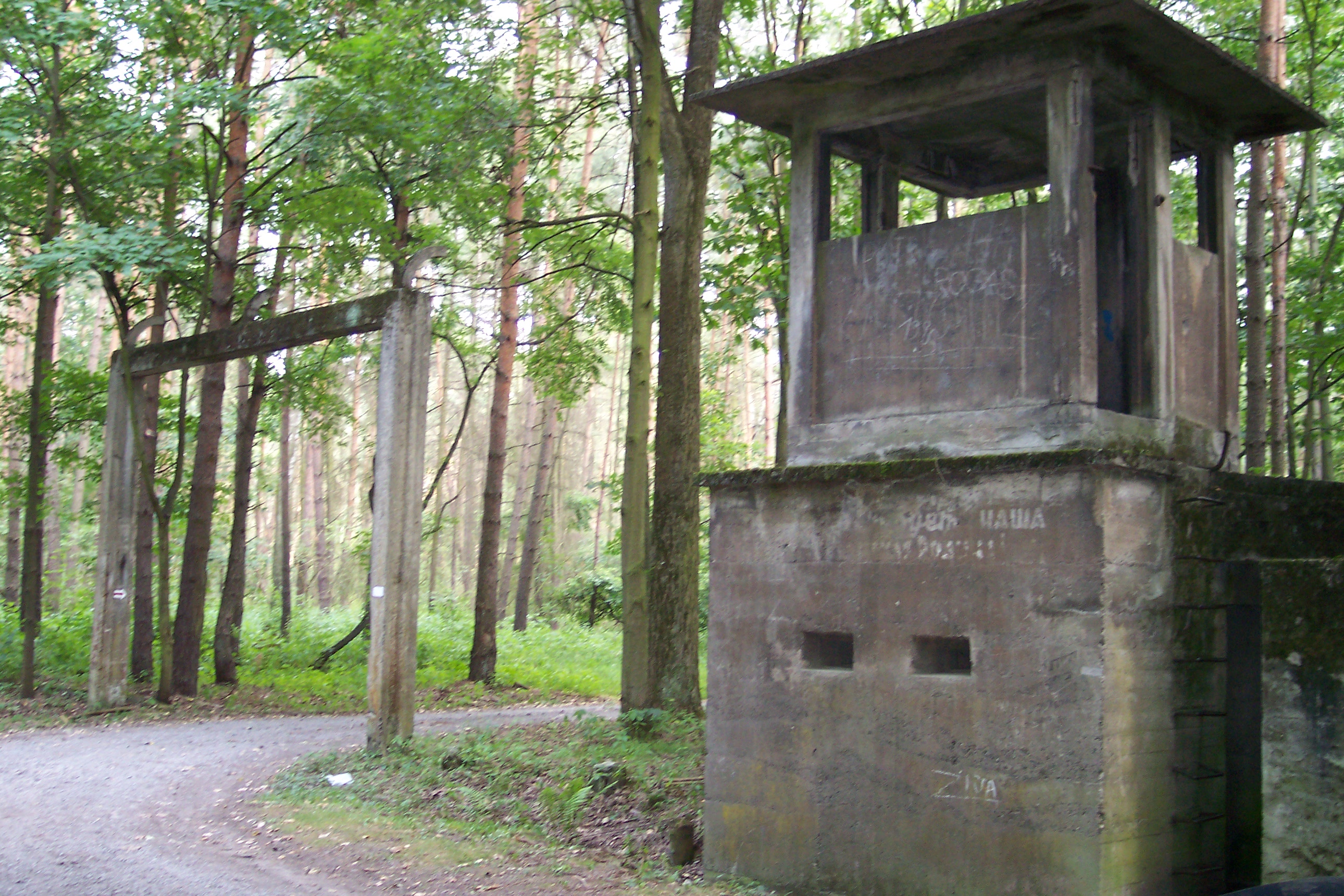
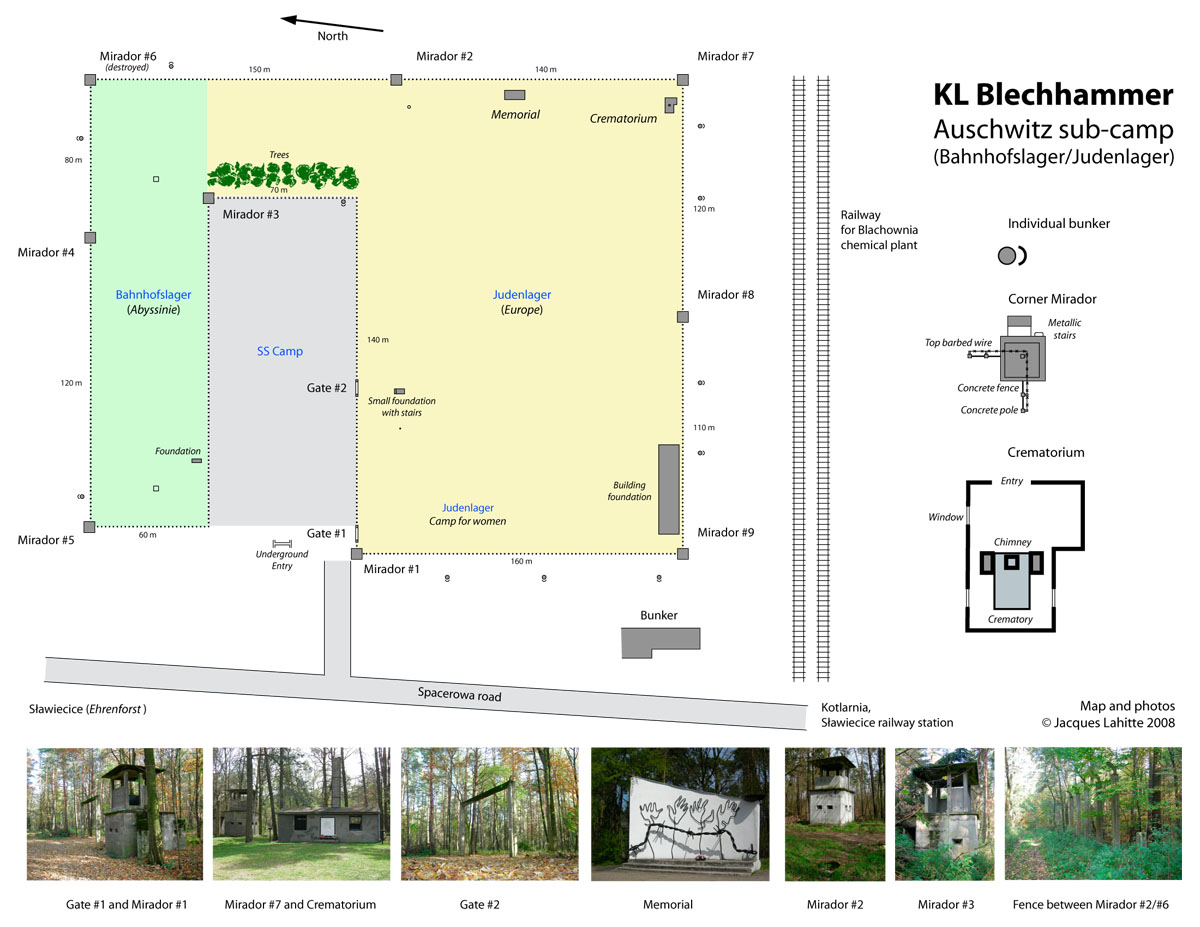
- Former watchtower
- Location: Blechhammer, East Upper Silesia, Nazi Germany
- Operated by: Nazi Germany
- Operational: 1 April 1944–26 January 1945
- Inmates: Mostly Jews
- Website: auschwitz.org/en/history/auschwitz-sub-camps/blechhammer/

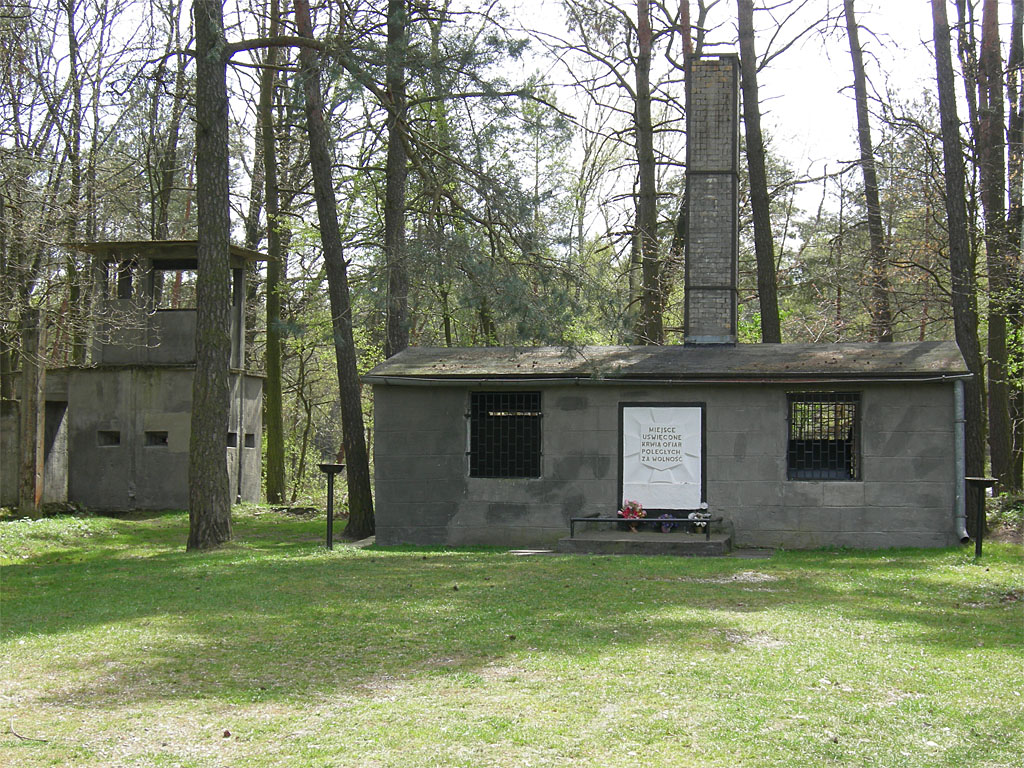
Former crematorium of the camp

Blechhammer was the second-largest subcamp of Auschwitz concentration camp, part of the Blechhammer industrial area where several camps were located. The camp was evacuated on 21 January 1945; five days later, German forces returned to kill some survivors who had been left behind.

== History ==
Established on 1 April 1944 when an existing forced-labor camp for Jews, located near the town of Blechhammer, now Blachownia Śląska, which was part of Germany until 1945, was placed under the command of Monowitz concentration camp. Blechhammer, which had initially about 3,000 male and 200 female prisoners, was the largest subcamp of Auschwitz excluding Monowitz. The camp contained 25 barracks within 10 acres (4.0 ha) and was surrounded by a 4 metres (13 ft) concrete wall. During its existence, 4,500 prisoners from fifteen countries passed through the camp.

Conditions were similar to other subcamps of Auschwitz. SS would periodically conduct selections of prisoners; those deemed incapable of work were deported to Auschwitz II-Birkenau, where many of them were killed. Another 250 prisoners died at Blechhammer itself; they were burned in the crematorium. Prisoners had to work on construction tasks, such as excavation, building structures, and pulling wagons in place of horses or tractors. After the nearby Hydrierwerke plant was bombed, Jewish prisoners were forced to sort out unexploded ordnance, during which many died.

The camp was evacuated on the morning of 21 January 1945 due to the approach of the Red Army; prisoners from camps farther east, including Jaworzno and Gleiwitz, were marched through Blechhammer. About 4,000 prisoners were given half a loaf of bread with a bit of margarine and honey and a half sausage, and no more food until they arrived at Gross-Rosen concentration camp on 2 February. More than 800 died or were murdered along the way. Around 100 sick prisoners were left behind in the infirmary, although some healthier prisoners, fearing another death march, managed to hide because the SS did not conduct a thorough search. Many of the healthier prisoners left the camp shortly after the last SS personnel.

== Massacre ==
About noon the same day as the evacuation, a group of Organization Todt personnel reached the camp. They ordered some of the healthier prisoners to dig a pit in order to bury the dead and shot some prisoners who had been scavenging for food from what the SS had left behind. An additional group of 10 mostly Slovak Jewish prisoners left, while the remainder stayed put for the next five days.

On 26 January, about 100 to 150 German soldiers returned to the camp. Witnesses disagree on whether they were Wehrmacht soldiers or SS; Daniel Blatman suggests that they may have been newly recruited camp guards still wearing their Wehrmacht uniforms. The soldiers first vandalized the abandoned SS office at the camp; then they went inside and began to shoot incapacitated prisoners in the infirmary. Those still able to walk were ordered to carry the corpses to the trenches dug the previous week, where they too were shot. The bodies were covered with straw and gasoline and set on fire; anyone trying to escape was shot. There was a thorough search of the camp and anyone found was also shot on sight. Fewer than ten prisoners managed to survive the massacre.

The massacre may have occurred because of an order given by Ernst-Heinrich Schmauser on 24 January not to leave a single live prisoner behind, but there is no proof that the murderers knew of the order. In any event, the decision to kill was taken by the officer who was present on the scene. It was not the only incident in which SS returned to an abandoned camp in order to kill the remaining prisoners; a similar massacre occurred at Tschechowitz-Vacuum, another subcamp of Auschwitz.
