= Limbenii Vechi =

- Village
- Location within Moldova
- Coordinates: 47.6897222222°N 27.6155555556°E
- Country: Moldova
- District: Glodeni

Government
  - Mayor: Valeriu Bandalac (PLDM)

Population (2014 census)
  - Total: 1,642
- Time zone: UTC+2 (EET)
  - Summer (DST): UTC+3 (EEST)

Limbenii Vechi is a commune in Glodeni District, Moldova.
