= Aktion Arbeitsscheu Reich =

Waves of Nazi arrests of people deemed "socially undesirable"

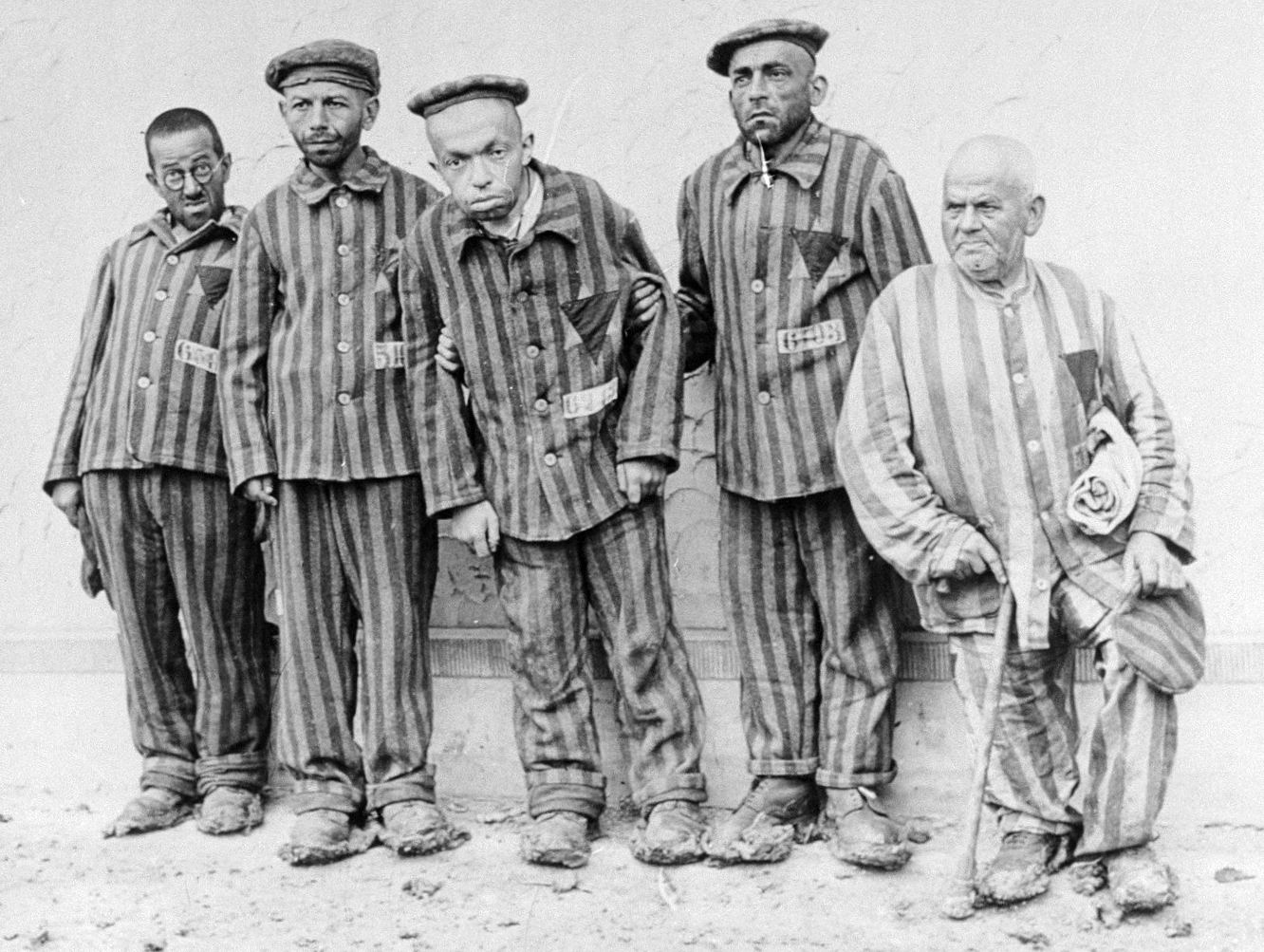
Disabled Jewish prisoners in Buchenwald

Aktion Arbeitsscheu Reich was a punitive campaign in Nazi Germany targeting individuals deemed as "work-shy" or ""asocial". In April and June 1938, as part of the "Arbeitsscheu Reich" (work-shy Reich), more than 10,000 men were arrested as so-called "anti-social elements" and sent to concentration camps. During the so-called Juni Aktion (June Action), about 2,500 Jews who had received previous convictions for varied reasons were also targeted.

== Terminology ==
The term action, work-shy Reich can be traced back to official correspondence, which was conducted in conjunction with mass arrests. In the Buchenwald concentration camp, detainees were referred to initially as "Reich compulsory labor prisoners", later being referred to as "work shy Reich" (ASR). This term was taken up by Hans Buchheim, originally used by Wolfgang Ayass for both arrest waves and became the standard term used. The "work shy" were those who were criminals, had refused to work, or fit other descriptions deemed socially undesirable.

However, the contemporary term "June Special" for the second wave of arrests and convicted Jews was also used. It was used largely in 1938, though it was by no means universally used. "June Special" was used as a connotation more for Jews, while "Work Shy" was used more for general arrests.

== Action in April 1938 ==
The arrest and deportation of "asocial individuals" goes back to the "basic decree on crime prevention by the police" issued by the Ministry of the Interior on 14 December 1937. The order called for a preventive detention of those deemed professional or habitual criminals, and later was extended to any who might "endanger society with asocial behavior."

After Reichsführer-SS Heinrich Himmler's plan of 26 January 1938, authorities began a "one-time, comprehensive and surprising seizure" done on the "work-shy". These were men of working age, who had twice refused a job offered to them or given up after a short time. After performing this action, the Gestapo then cooperated with the labor offices in dealing with these men.

The implementation of the action was scheduled for March, but was postponed due to the annexation of Austria. The arrest operation was far-reaching all over the Reich in the period from 21 to 30 April. Overall, there were between 1500 and 2000 male "work-shy" deported to the Buchenwald concentration camp.

== Actions in May and June 1938 ==
Those detained under the status of "Preventive Criminals" were not limited to the "work-shy", but used in arrests much more broadly. An implementing directive of the Reich Criminal Code in April 1938 defined "asocial" as any person who showed continual misconduct or repeated violations of the law, who did not fit into the community and submit to the "self-evident order" the Nazi state desired. These in particular were vagrants, beggars, prostitutes, gypsies and alcoholics. Even people with untreated venereal diseases were included as well.

On Adolf Hitler's personal orders, Jews were also included. Wolf Gruner quotes the statement made by Hitler in the last week of May 1938 in the following notation: "the completion of major earthworks throughout the Reich" would be completed by "anti-social and criminal Jews to be arrested." When the order was passed orally, it was misunderstood, because the meaning of "anti-social" changed depending on the usage of uppercase or lowercase. In fact, the state police headquarters in Vienna took up the initiative "in a flash" and ordered that the district police stations on 24 May 1938 "immediately arrest unpleasant, particularly criminally predisposed Jews and to bring them to the Dachau concentration camp." The first two transports of 31 May and 3 June included nearly 1,200 Jews and are referred to by Wolf Gruner as an "Austrian special action".

In the June deportations, it was predominantly "anti-social" persons who were arrested. Generally, for the second action, it was mostly Jews living within the Austrian kingdom, whose criminal record included convictions of more than four weeks, who were deemed "anti-social". This next wave of arrests known as the Juni Aktion (June Action) led to the arrests of about 9000 men by police from 13 to 18 June.

In the "June Special" Jews were disproportionately detained with about 2,300 men in total. Criminal history was often not based on normal delinquency alone, but based largely on tracking back several offenses far from the past, including minor infringements such as traffic violations.

211 Jewish prisoners were admitted to the Dachau concentration camp. 1,256 Jewish men were admitted to the Buchenwald concentration camp and 824 to the Sachsenhausen concentration camp, where they were subjected to harassment.

== Classification ==
The focus of security police activity to combat political enemies had shifted to the rejection of "anti-social" behavior, which tended to be socially harmful conduct supposedly due to hereditary predisposition. Heydrich justified the action in a quick letter to the criminal police control centers, stating anti-social behaviour would not be tolerated beyond the ability to work, so as to have no set backs to the Four Year infrastructure plan.

Wolfgang Ayass suggests that workers were often not chosen based on the alleged dangerousness of the individual or his "asocial" behaviour, but his work ability was often the decisive arrest criterion. In many concentration camps, these men were marked with a black inmate insignia and formed groups of "asocial" workers until the outbreak of the larger war. Martin Broszat noted that at this time the SS began increasing material production for its armaments and buildings and in concentration camps, larger prisoner quotas were needed. The "Work-shy" workers were often used as a deterrent to other "slackers" in the labour force, since they often had more difficult tasks.

The "June Special" was also the first carried out by the security police on their own discretion, in which a large number of German Jews were deported to concentration camps. Their inclusion in the June action goes back to Hitler's personal orders from 1 June 1938, to have them included. Christian Dirks suggests a connection with antisemitic attacks in Berlin, which, starting in May, escalated from 13 to 16 June 1938 with boycotts of Jewish shops, marking shops, raids on cafes and arrests. Christian Faludi noted a connection between Joseph Goebbels and Wolf-Heinrich Graf von Helldorf in staging "anti-Semitic street riots" in Berlin and advancing the goal of a "totally centralized state solution” by the intelligence apparatus of Reinhard Heydrich and Heinrich Himmler.

Wolfgang Ayass believed numbers in the "work-shy Empire" deteriorated, considering that they were mostly freed in 1939 in the amnesty on occasion of Hitler's fiftieth birthday. Comparable mass arrests for these groups were never repeated. However, up to 1945, there were still continuous "asocial" and "work-shy" prisoners sent to concentration camps. Himmler himself estimated in 1943 that the total number of "antisocial" and "professional criminal" detainees to be around 70,000 people.

Julia Hoerath points out that the "general racial prevention" orders were often conflicting between local and central authorities. SS and Gestapo leadership did not immediately establish authority on the issue.

== See also ==
- Aktion T4
- Critique of work
- Forced labour
- Refusal of work

== Bibliography ==
- Wolfgang Ayass: "A bid of the national labor discipline". The "action indolence Empire" in 1938, in: Contributions to the National Socialist Health and Social Policy, Vol 6, Berlin 1988, pp. 43–74.
- Wolfgang Ayass: "asocial" in National Socialism. Klett-Cotta, Stuttgart 1995, ISBN 3-608-91704-7.
- Wolfgang Ayass: "community aliens". Sources to pursue "asocial" 1933-1945, Koblenz 1998th
- Christian Dierks: The June-action 'in Berlin in 1938. In: Beate Meyer, Hermann Simon: Jews in Berlin from 1938 to 1945. (Companion volume to the exhibition at the Foundation "New Synagogue Berlin – Centrum Judaicum"), Berlin 2000, ISBN 3-8257-0168-9.
- Jens Kolata: The social disciplining and "racial hygiene". The pursuit of "antisocial", "work-shy", "Swing Youth" and Sinti, in: Ingrid Bauz, Sigrid Brüggemann, Roland Maier (eds.): The Secret State Police in Württemberg and Hohenzollern, Stuttgart 2013, ISBN 3-89657-138- 9, pp. 321–337 (not seen)
- Stefanie Schüler Springorum: mass detainment in concentration camps. Action "work-shy Empire", November pogrom, action "Storm". In: Wolfgang Benz (Eds.): The place of terror. History of the Nazi concentration camp. Munich 2005, ISBN 3-406-52961-5, vol. 1, pp. 156–164.
- Christian Faludi (Eds.): The "June Special" 1938 A documentation of the radicalization of the persecution of the Jews. Campus, Frankfurt a. M. / New York, 2013, ISBN 978-3-593-39823-5
