= Blechhammer =

- Part of Provinz Oberschlesien of Greater German Reich
- Located in Upper Silesia
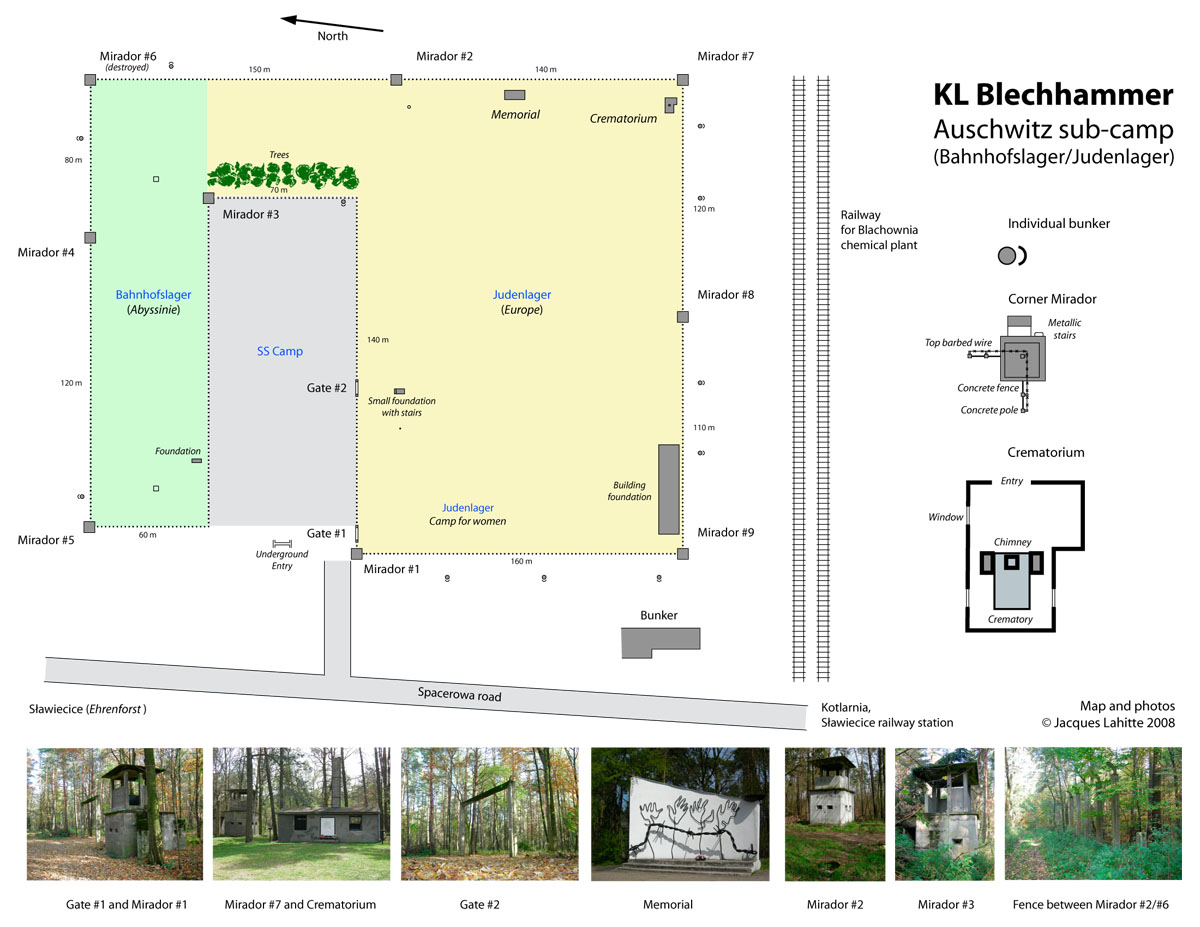
- Blechhammer map of Bahnhofslager/Judenlager

Location
- Coordinates: North plant 50°21′N 18°18′E South plant 50°18′N 18°15′E; Nearby camps & plants: Korzonek camp Heydebreck plant Cosel plant Odertal plant 50°25′N 18°8′E

Site history
- In use: 1942–1945 (50,000 POWs)
- Battles/wars: Oil Campaign of World War II
- Events: 1944-05: flak guns added 1945-01-21: The March (1945); 1945-01: Soviet occupation Post-war: Area recovered by Poland

The Blechhammer (English: sheet metal hammer) (nowadays Blachownia Śląska, district of the City of Kędzierzyn-Koźle) area was the location of Greater German Reich chemical plants, prisoner of war camps, and forced labor camps (German: Arbeitslager Blechhammer; also Nummernbücher). Labor camp prisoners began arriving as early as 17 June 1942, and in July 1944, 400–500 men were transferred from the Terezin family camp to Blechhammer. The mobile "pocket furnace" (German: Taschenofen) crematorium was at Sławięcice.) and Bau und Arbeits Battalion (BAB, English: Construction and Labour Battalion) 21 was a mile from the Blechhammer oil plants and was not far from Kattowitz and Breslau. Blechhammer synthetic oil (aka synthetic fuel) production began 1 April 1944 with 4000 prisoners, with the slave labor camp holding these prisoners during April 1944, becoming a satellite camp of the dreaded Auschwitz extermination camp, as Arbeitslager Blechhammer.

== Chemical plants ==
Two plants in the area, Blechhammer North (south of Sławięcice) and Blechhammer South at Azoty (5 miles (8.0 km) from the labor camp) were nicknamed "Black Hammer" by Allied bomber aircrews. The facilities were approximately 2 miles (3.2 km) apart with each occupying a 3,000 × 5,000 ft (914 × 1524 m) area in open country. Similar to the Gelsenberg plant, the Blechhammer plants used bituminous coal from Upper Silesian Coal Basin in the Bergius process to synthesize Ersatz oil. In June 1944, the United States Army Air Forces considered Blechhammer one of the four "principal synthetic oil plants in Germany", and after the Fifteenth Air Force had dropped 7,082 tons (14,164,000 lbs; 6,424 tonnes) of bombs on Blechhammer, the Blechhammer plants were dismantled post-war by the Soviets.

== Evacuation ==
In March 1945 the POWs were evacuated. One camp went to Regensburg, BAB 21 went to Landshut) and on 25 January, labor camp prisoners were force-marched for five days to Bergen Belsen (about 20% died en route). Some small groups did manage to escape (see František R. Kraus).

The "7 Company" was the guard battalion for Blechhammer, and the 1945 Belsen Trial convicted Blechhammer staff members Karl Francioh and Ansgar Pichen.

== Camps ==
The Blechhammer complex contained a number of POW Camps: BAB 21 (E794), 40, 48; E3, E714, E769, Camp 139.

Life at Blechhamer and the work parties is described in Captive Plans, the POW diary of Reg Beattie and by a Czech survivor, journalist František R. Kraus.

== See also ==
- Polish areas annexed by Nazi Germany
- Monowitz concentration camp
- Oil Campaign of World War II
- Territorial changes of Poland after World War II
