= Limbenii Noi =

- Village
- Location within Moldova
- Coordinates: 47.7177777778°N 27.6247222222°E
- Country: Moldova
- District: Glodeni

Government
  - Mayor: Anatolie Buzut (PLDM)

Population (2014 census)
  - Total: 1,556
- Time zone: UTC+2 (EET)
  - Summer (DST): UTC+3 (EEST)

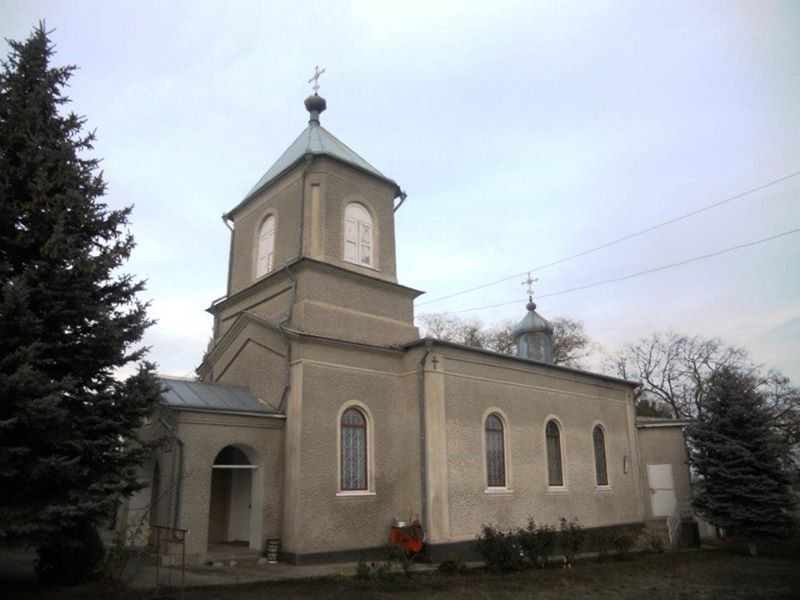
The "Holy Trinity" Church in the locality, a state-protected monument.

Limbenii Noi is a village in Glodeni District, Moldova.
