= History of the Jews in Odesa =

History of the Jews in the city of Odesa

Odesan Jews
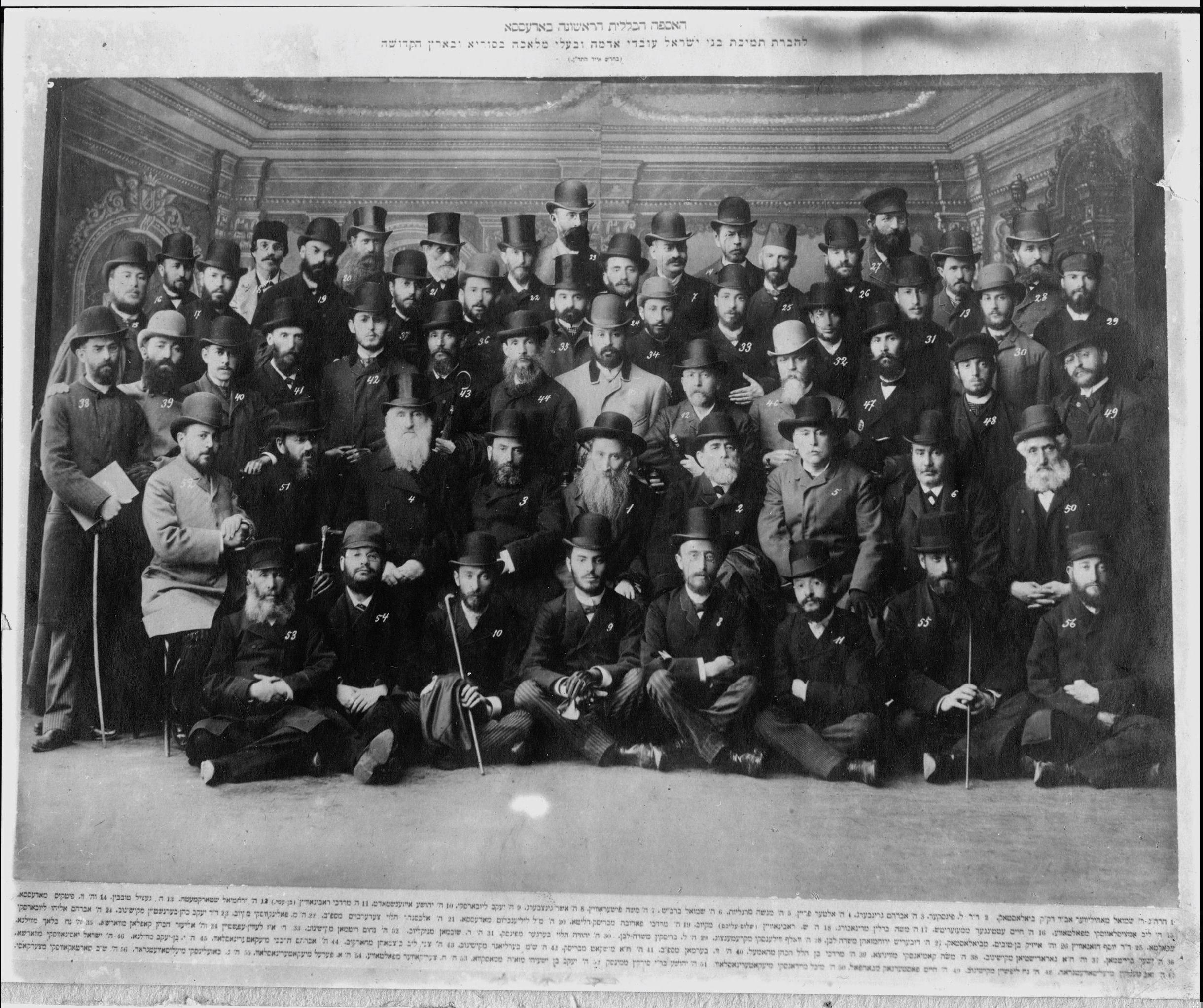
- The members of 1st general assembly of Odesa Committee in 1890

Total population
- 12,380 (2001)

Languages
- Yiddish, Hebrew, Russian, Ukrainian

Religion
- Judaism, Atheism

The history of the Jews in Odesa dates to 16th century. Since the modern city's founding in 1795, Odesa has been home to one of the largest population of Jews in what is today Ukraine. Odesa was a major center of Eastern European Jewish cultural life. From Odesa sailed the SS Ruslan which is considered the mayflower of Israeli culture. They comprised the largest ethno-religious group in the region throughout most of the 19th century and until the mid-20th century when the Jews were massacred by Romanian forces occupying the city or deported to be later killed during the Holocaust.

== Background ==
Jews have been a part of the region's economic activities for many centuries. Starting in 16th century, Jews from the Polish Crown had been settling in what is today southern Ukraine, working as merchants, importers and translators among the Cossacks in the Zaporozhian Sich. They were also active in exporting goods from Crimea to the mainland and owned a substantial share of the stores and taverns in the region. After the abolition of the Zaporozhian Sich in 1775, when Russians took control over the area, Jews moved to the newly established coastal towns, one of them being Khazhibei, which was renamed Odesa in 1795.

The early Jewish settlers in the region were possibly Sephardi Jews, who had migrated from Crimea. Several tombstones written in Hebrew dated between 1765 and 1789 have been found in the region.

== Initial growth ==
By 1799, the Jewish population of the city numbered 317, comprising 187 males and 130 females. (Note: for detailed history of demographics see section on demographics) Around this period, there were multiple Jewish religious institutions, including a burial society, a synagogue, and a school for orphans named Talmud Torah. A hekdesh (workhouse) was built and a Kehillah (commune) was organised.

Immigration to the region happened in two distinct waves during the first two decades of 19th century, on which the remote and newly formed Jewish community relied heavily for its growth. As Steven Zipperstein argues, Jewish immigrants "looked upon Odesa, with its wide streets and limestone buildings, as a world apart from the ancient settlements to which they were accustomed, and Odesa came to represent to Jews elsewhere […] the option of a fresh start, offering a change in climate, economic possibilities, and perimeters of acceptable religious behavior".

=== Economic life ===
Jewish participation in commerce played an important role in the city, despite the number of Jews declining from 240 in 1794 to 135 in 1797. According to a report from the latter year, the Jews possessed most of the city's commercial capital and dominated commodity trade in items such as silk, cotton, wool, hardware, iron, and shoes and largely controlled the export of salt. Many Jews also worked for the Russian army as petty traders or artisans while they were stationed in the fortress. However, only two Jews were wealthy enough to register themselves under the kuptsy (merchants) category in 1801. The richer Jews lived largely in the centre of the city, while the poor were concentrated in Moldavanka and the Peresyp district.

== Second wave ==
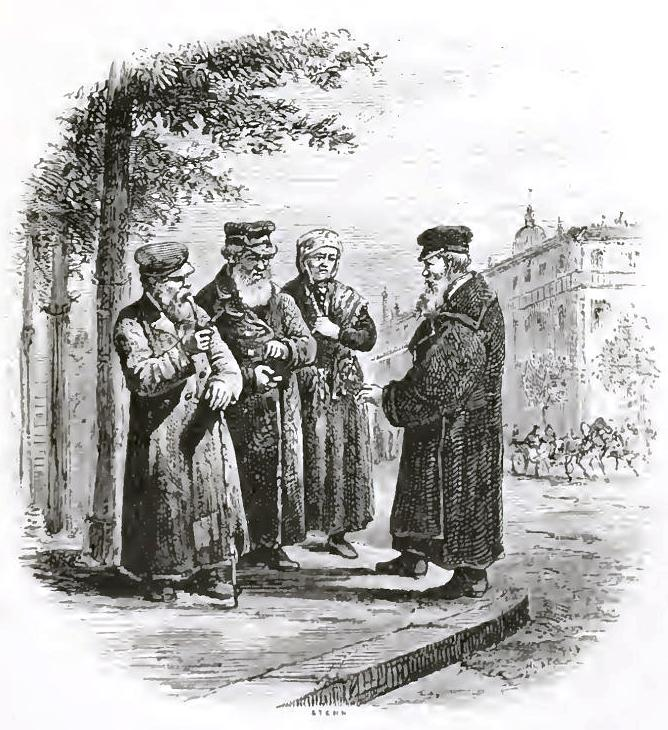
Odesan Jews in 1876

The second wave of settlers, who came from Volhynia, Podilia, White Russia Moldavia and the town of Brody, arrived immediately following the first one. These new settlers grew aware of the potential importance of the Russian Black Sea port and were trying to profit from fluctuations on the grain market. More arrivals of Jewish families came from city of Kherson.

In contrast to the first wave, where people came individually, the second wave was characterized by arrival of families. Between 1809 and 1819, Odesa become a city of international importance, which gave the Jewish community in the region a wide range of opportunities. The process of immigration also weakened the normally strict adherence to religious activities. For example, on one evening in 1817, the city's rabbi Berish Ben Yisrael was beaten to death in the streets by a group of Jews who were unhappy with stringent observation of ritual law.

=== Galician Jews ===
Around the 1830s, Galician Jews dominated the roles of middlemen and agents in the grain trade of the city, while also being employed as bankers, merchants, and brokers, with 86% of brokers in Odesa being Jewish. Emerging as the wealthiest sector of the Jews, they took control of local Kehillah. Even after the Russian government had dissolved all Jewish Kehillah in 1844, the Odesa Kehillah continued to function as a semi-autonomous body in the region, whose meetings were held at regular intervals.

Between 1837 and 1844, the number of Jewish merchants who were members of the kuptsy category increased from 169 to 221. In 1842, 228 businesses, 67 factories and workshops, and 26 crockery stores in the city were owned by Jews. By 1850, Jews had become the fastest-growing group in city commerce and constituted its majority − out of 5,466 individuals engaged in the commercial economy in 1851, 2,907 (53.2%) were Jews.

In 1826, Galician Jews opened a modern elementary school, which taught secular as well as Jewish subjects. (Note: The original curriculum included subjects such as Hebrew, the Talmud, calligraphy, arithmetic, German, and Russian.) Despite the opposition of Jewish traditionalists, headed by Moshe Tsvi, (Note: Moshe Tsvi, known affectionately as Hasit'l hayat (the little Hasidic tailor, or simply the pious tailor), he hailed from Hasidim family of Savran, a town situated 120 miles (190 km) away from Odesa) this act was supported by city authorities. In the first year, over 250 students had enrolled in the school. Max Lilienthal noted that in 1842 the school had around 400–500 students. In 1852, when the school was merged into the state school system, this number increased to 2,500.

=== Brodsky Synagogue ===
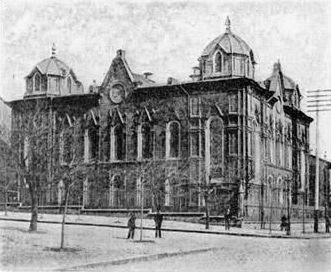
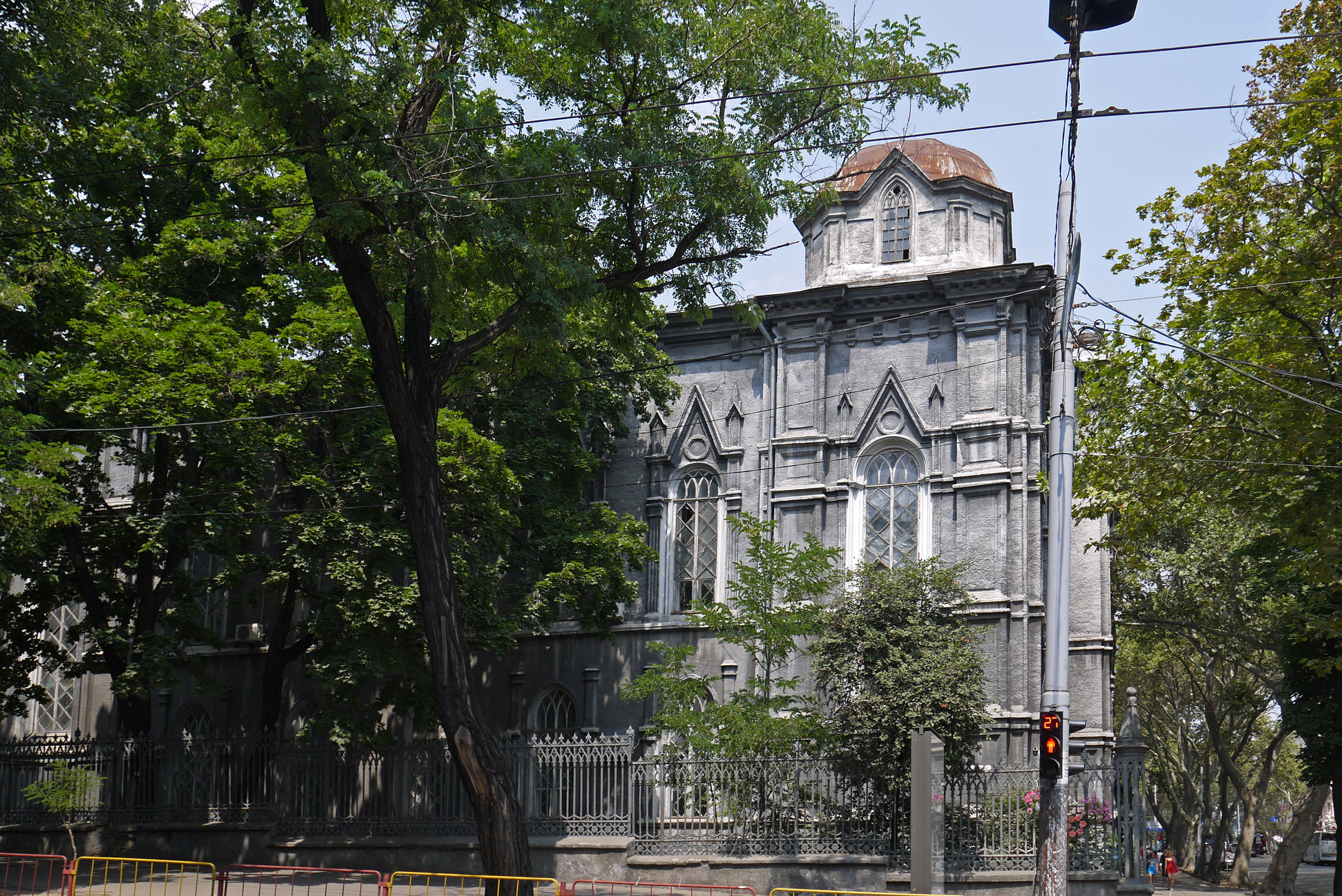
The Brodsky Synagogue c. 1865 (top) and in 2016 (bottom)

In the 1840s, the Brody Jews leased their first synagogue, at the corner of Pushkin and Postal (now Sviatoslava Karavanskoho) streets in a relatively small house, from the wealthy Greek businessman Ksenysu. The Cantor was Rabbi Nissan Blumenthal, who had come from the town of Brody. The reformation of synagogues was one of the priorities of Maskilim in the city, which proved a success, as the Brodsky Synagogue soon become the model for Jewish prayer in the region. The older Glavaina synagogue, formerly known as Beit Knesset Ha Gadol, established in 1795 and located on the main arteries of the city (Rishelevskaia Ulitsa), was renovated on the model of the Brodsky Synagogue.

In 1863, the Brodsky Synagogue announced its commitment to build a new structure. The purchase of a dedicated lot and construction cost 35,646 rubles, contributed by 197 individuals. It was designed by architect Joseph N. Kollovich in the Gothic Florentine style. Built with local limestone, the synagogue, which became the largest in the southern regions of the Russian Empire, was completed in 1863 and served as a local landmark of Moorish architecture. The Brodsky Synagogue become the most prominent synagogue in Odesa and the first modern synagogue in the Russian Empire.

== The 19th and early 20th centuries ==
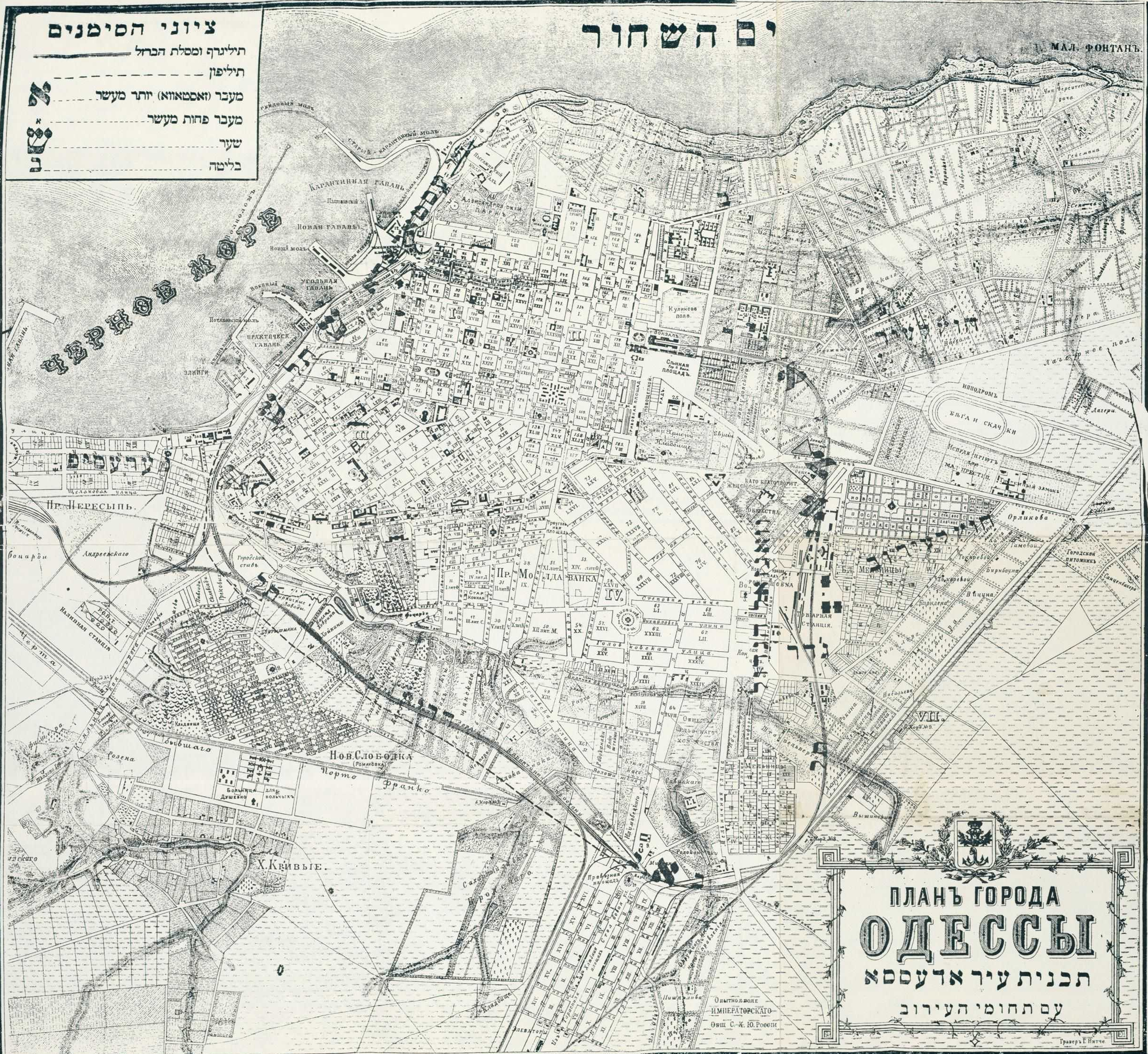
1894 Hebrew and Russian map of Odessa eruv

Under the reign of Nicholas I, the persecution of Jews became official. The major provisions regarding Jews under his reign included: conscription of Jews, including their children, which was passed in 1827; provisions regarding travel and settlement restrictions, signed into law in 1835; abolition of Qahal system in 1844; expulsions of Jewish populations from Kyiv, Kherson, and Sevastopol; and bans regarding use of Hebrew and Yiddish in public. The Tsar also issued an 1844 decree providing for creation of new Jewish schools, similar to district and governmental schools, which were aimed at assimilation of Jews.

Due to the blockade of Odesa port during the Crimean War and subsequent disruption of trade, the city's exports rapidly dropped tenfold from 1853 to 1855. The losses forced Greek magnates of the city to close their offices, and the city failed to recover its lost clients following the war. However, unlike the Greeks, the Jews were able to withstand the recession due to their close contact with the producers, which greatly improved their ability to assess the market and allowed them to trade with a smaller profit margin. As a result, the Greek stake in the export trade was quickly superseded by that of the Jews. By 1872–1875, Jews owned 60% of the commercial firms and most of retail stores in the city.

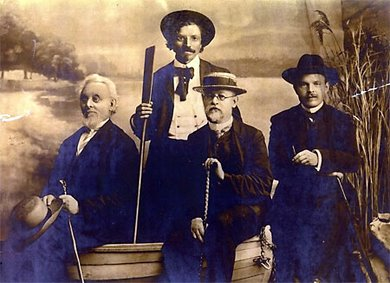
Mendele Mocher Sforim, Sholem Aleichem, Mordechai Ben Ami, and Hayim Nahman Bialik in Odesa, 1910

During 1860s, the city become a center of modern Jewish intelligentsia. With Yiddish being spoken by almost a third of the population, the city rose as a centre of Yiddish literature during the 1860s, playing a large role in the cultural transformation of Russian Jewry. Many of the most successful Jewish institutions existed in Odesa, which attracted many Jewish intellectuals from across Russia. (Note: Most distinguished among them includes Hayim Nahman Bialik, Saul Tchernikhovsky, Ahad Ha'am and Simon Dubnow)

The community had, however, fallen victim to increased tensions with other nationalities, which eventually evolved into open antisemitism. During the 1821 anti-Jewish riots in Odesa, which occurred after the death of the Greek Orthodox patriarch in Constantinople, 14 Jews were killed. Notable pogroms occurred in 1821, 1849, 1859, 1871, 1881, 1900, 1905, and 1918–1919. The term became common after a wave of large-scale anti-Jewish violence swept the southern Russian Empire, including Ukraine, between 1881 and 1884, incited by rumours blaming Jews for the assassination of Alexander II.

Additionally, the May Laws of 1882 gave impetus to political activism among Russian Jews and mass emigration. More than two million Jews fled Russia between 1881 and 1920, the vast majority emigrating to the United States and the Ottoman region that became Palestine, and the city became an important base of support for Zionism.

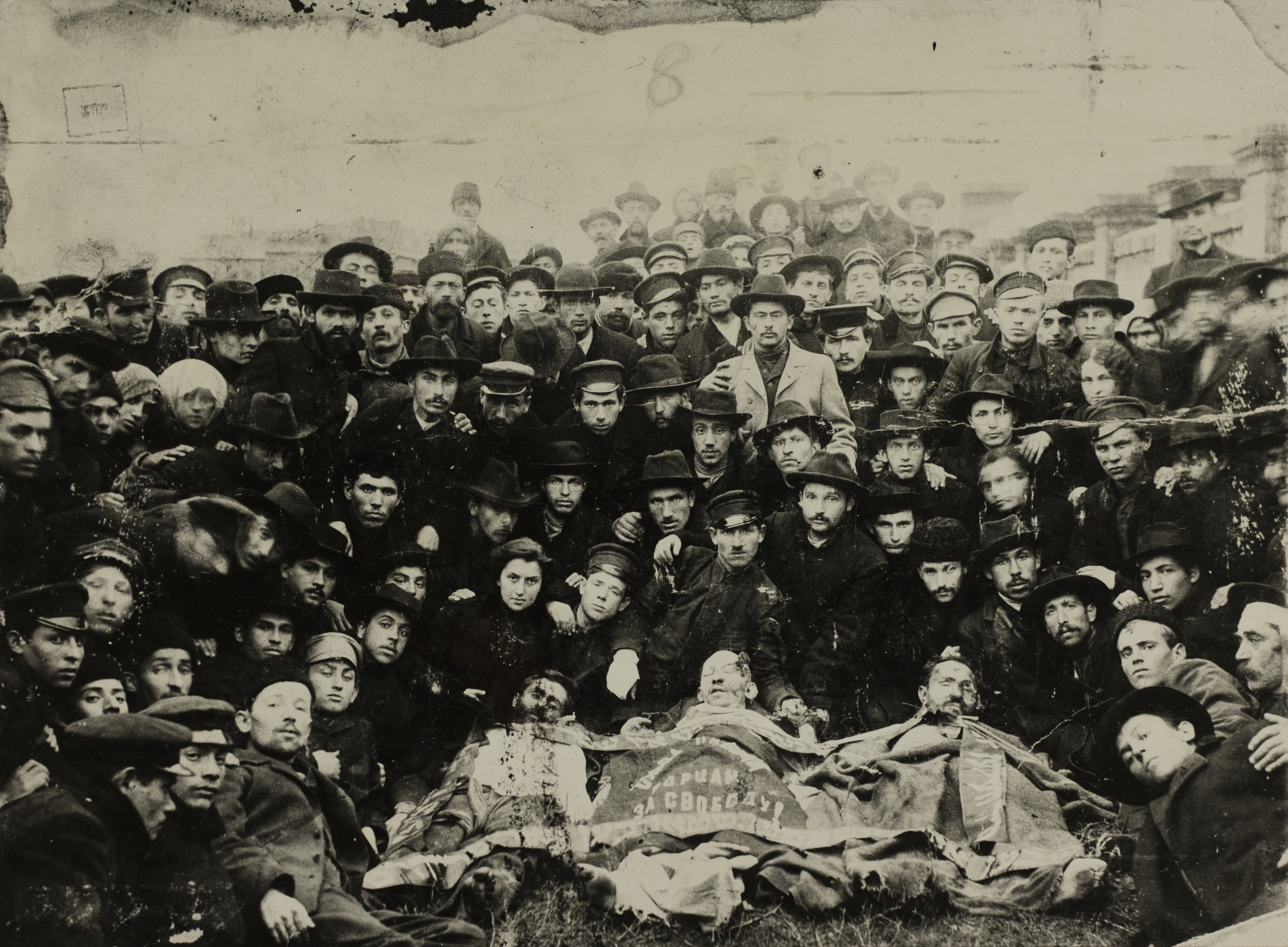
Members of the Jewish Labour Bund with bodies of their comrades killed in Odesa during the Odessa pogroms

In 1882, members of Bilu and Hovevei Zion made what came to be known as the First Aliyah to Palestine, then a part of the Ottoman Empire. Initially, these organizations were not official, and to attain a legally recognized framework, a Jewish organization had to be registered as a charity in various European countries; American Jews provided most of the funding. After arduous negotiations, the Russian government approved the establishment of the Society for the Support of Jewish Farmers and Artisans in Syria and Palestine, also known as the Odesa Committee, in early 1890. It was based in Odesa, headed by Leon Pinsker, and dedicated to practical aspects of establishing Jewish agricultural settlements in Palestine. The Tsarist government also sporadically encouraged Jewish emigration. Before the First Zionist Congress in 1897, the Odesa Committee counted over 4,000 members. When the Zionist Organization was founded in 1897, most of the Hovevei Zion societies joined it. The Odesa Committee continued to function until it was closed in 1913.

Despite the efforts to promote Zionism and subsequent emigration, however, the share of Jews in the population of Odesa remained fairly constant, at about 35%. Even after World War I and the Russian Civil War, there were more than 150,000 Jews in Odesa, constituting 36.7% of the total population.

=== SS Ruslan ===
The SS Ruslan set sail from Odesa in 1919 carrying with it some of the future intellectual and cultural of Israel including the historian Joseph Klausner, the artist Yitzhak Frenkel Frenel, the architect Ze'ev Rechter.

== Second World War and beyond ==
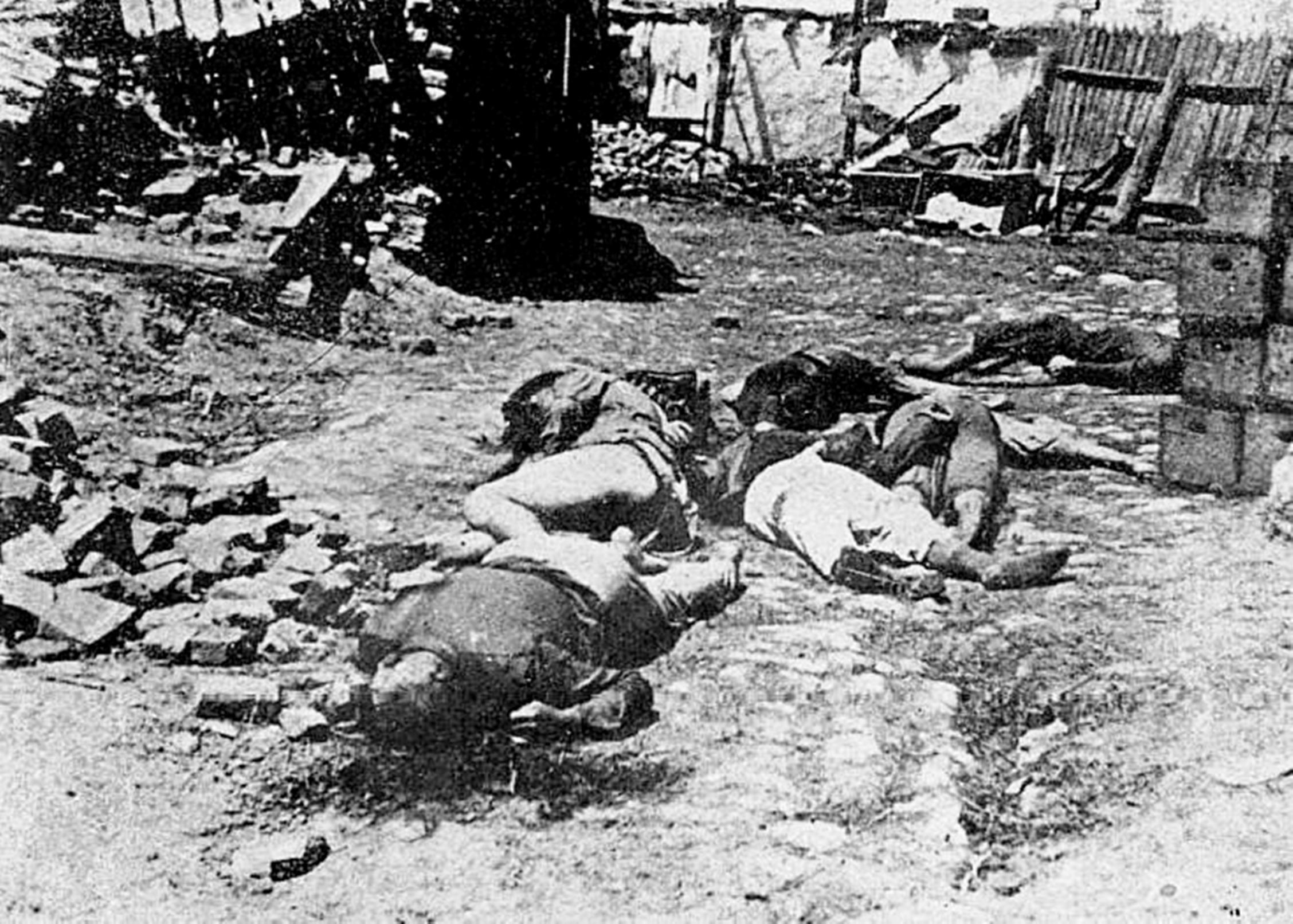
Aftermath of the Odesa Massacre: Jewish deportees killed outside Brizula (now Podilsk)

During the Second World War, Odesa was attacked by the combined forces of Romanian and German troops in August 1941. Following the 73-day Siege of Odesa, the city was captured and put under Romanian administration, becoming the capital of the Transnistria Governorate. On 23 October, with the arrival of Axis forces in the city, an order was issued directing all people of Jewish origin to report to the village of Dalnyk the following day; around 5,000 Jews obeyed. The first 50 people were brought to the anti-tank ditch and shot by the commander of the 10th machine-gun battalion, Lieutenant-Colonel Nicolae Deleanu. Between 5,000 and 10,000 Jews were killed and many were taken hostage. During the first week of the Romanians' stay in Odesa, the city lost about 10% of its population.

Approximately 25,000 Odesan Jews were murdered on the outskirts of the city and over 35,000 deported; this came to be known as the Odesa massacre. While the number of the dead regardless of ethnicity in the Odessa massacre of October 22–24, 1941, was larger, according to Julius Fisher, Transnistria, The Forgotten Cemetery, 20,000 Jews were killed in the massacre. According to the Yad Vashem data base, the number of Jews killed in the city of Odessa whose names are known was 20,334. Given that about 25,000 individuals were executed in Odessa, the difference between that number and the number of Jews who were executed were individuals of other ethnicities. According to the Black Book, "An announcement was hung up on the walls saying that three hundred Russians or five hundred Jews would be hanged for every officer killed".

Most of the atrocities were committed during the first six months of the occupation and perpetrated by Einsatzgruppen death squads. By six months after 17 October 1941, according to the Israeli scholar Dalia Ofer, 80% of the 210,000 Jews in the region had been killed. In his synthesis of Holocaust studies, The Holocaust in History, Michael Marrus wrote, "In all, some 75 percent of the Jews of Transnistria perished". This was in contrast to Jews in Romania proper, where the majority survived.

According to the United States Holocaust Memorial Museum, "Soon after, the Romanians sent approximately 25,000 to 30,000 Jews on a death march from Odesa to a camp in the village of Bohdanivka (called Bogdanovca in Romanian). Nearly all these Jews were massacred at the camp within six to eight weeks of arrival." "The Holocaust in Odesa", in Holocaust Encyclopedia, at https://encyclopedia.ushmm.org/content/en/article/odessa . Many thousands of Jews from Odessa were sent to the Domanivka concentration camp, where they were overwhelmingly shot or died of starvation, with the exception of at most a few hundred out of the 500 total survivors.

About 30,000 Jews from Odessa and thousands of Jews from Berezovka County and elsewhere, mainly from other places in southern Transnistria (perhaps 10,000), were evacuated by the Romanian authorities to various localities in Berezovka Judet/County (unless they were from there) and were executed by the Germans. According to the Black Book, edited by Ilya Ehrenburg and Vasily Gorssman, 27,000 Jews were executed in the Berezovka district by the local ethnic Germans. According to Nora Levin, who wrote the first book about the Holocaust that focused not mostly on the perpetrators, but mostly on the Jewish victims, about 28,000 Jews were killed in the ethnic German colonies in Transnistria. Raul Hilberg, citing a German Foreign Office document, provides the same number of 28,000. Radu Ioanid estimates the number of such executed Jews in the Berezovka district/couty at 31,000, though this number also included deportees from Romania, including the Old Kingdom. According to the data provided by Jean Ancel, out of 32,819 Jews deported by the Romanian authorities from Odessa in early 1942 to Berezovka County, only 1,544 survived until April 1942, and 425 survived until March 22, 1943, which means that 32,394 died.

When the Nazi forces had lost ground in the Eastern Front, the Romanian administration amended its policy and declined to deport the remaining Jewish population of eastern Europe to extermination camps situated in German-occupied Poland, while allowing Jews to work as hired labourers. In contrast to other areas of occupied Eastern Europe, the survival of Jewish population was significantly higher in Odesa. By the end of World War II, only 5,000 of the Jews of Odessa who did not retreat with the Soviet forces were still alive. According to the United States Holocaust Memorial Museum, "Only a small number of Jews survived the Holocaust in Odesa, either as forced laborers or in hiding."

Small numbers of Jews from Odessa were sent by the Romanian authorities to places in central and northern Transnistria. For example, among the Jews who had lived in Odessa during the war, 54 died in Balta, Ukraine. Among the Jews who had lived in Odessa during the war, 32 died in Bershad. In the first major study of the Holocaust in English, Gerald Reitlinger wrote that thousands of the Jews from Odessa, that "the Jews were distributed among the Transndniestrian towns with the deportees from Rumania. Reitlinger, a British Jewish scholar of the Holocaust, claimed that "(N)o attempt was made to exterminate" this small group of "Jews of Odessa". In early 1942, a few hundred Jews originally from Odessa were sent to the Vapniarka concentration camp. Many of them died; a Jew originally from Odessa died in Vapniarka in September 1942. One thousand Jews were brought to the site in October 1941, mostly from the city of Odessa; they were Bessarabian Jews who had previously fled to Odessa. Some 200 died in a typhus epidemic; the others were taken out of the camp in two batches, guarded by soldiers of the Romanian Gendarmerie, and shot to death. Moreover, the death of 41 individual Odessa Jews, whose specific names were listed, in the Akmechetka concentration camp was documented by Yad Vashem. Yad Vashem has a list of 724 Jews who lived in Odessa during the war who were neither evacuated with the Soviets, nor died in the Holocaust, but survived, and 2,869 whose fate was not clear.

After the war, Jews constituted more than ten percent of Odesa's population, and could be found in most occupational groups from port stevedores and unskilled workers to the intellectual elite. Since the 1970s, the majority of the remaining Jewish population emigrated in two distinct aliyahs, one in the 1970s and the other after the dissolution of the Soviet Union. Emigrants went mainly to Israel, but some also moved to the Jewish Autonomous Oblast or other countries, shrinking the Jewish community in the region.

== Historical demographics ==
From 1880 to 1920, Odesa had the second largest Jewish population in the Russian Empire.

During its founding year (1795), the city's population was recorded at 2,500 people. In 1848, the city's population had risen to over 90,000 people, making it the third-largest city in the Russian Empire. This growth was due to mass inflows of immigrants, leading to increases of population from 86,729 in 1849 to 193,500 in 1873. In 1826, the Jews comprised 89% of the total population in the city. The population rose to 404,000 in 1892, with Jews comprising the second-largest group. There were 198,233 Russians followed by 124,511 Jews (49.09% and 30.83% of the population, respectively). However, only 38.5% of the Jews were born in the city. Accordingly, the Jewish population of southern provinces in New Russia had increased by 333% between 1844 and 1880, and Jews comprised around 5.6% of the total population of Russia.

Jewish population across the years
| 1858 | 1892 | 1926 | 1939 | 1970 | 2001 |
|---|---|---|---|---|---|
| unknown | 198,233 Russians (49.09%) | Russians: 162,789 (39.97%) | 186,610 Russians (30.88%) | unknown | 291,908 Russians (29.0%) |
| 14,000 Jews (14%) | 124,511 Jews (30.83%) | 153,243 Jews (36.69%) | 200,961 Jews (33.26%) | 116,000 Jews (13%) | 12,380 Jews (1.23%) |

== Gallery ==
=== Synagogues ===
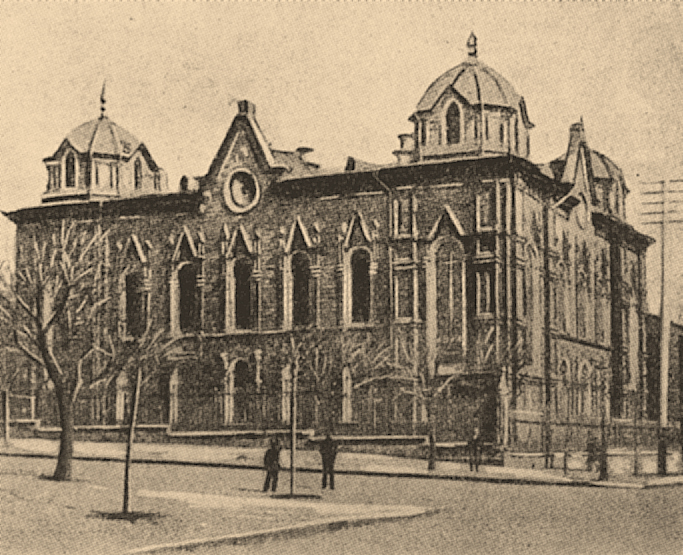
Brodsky Synagogue

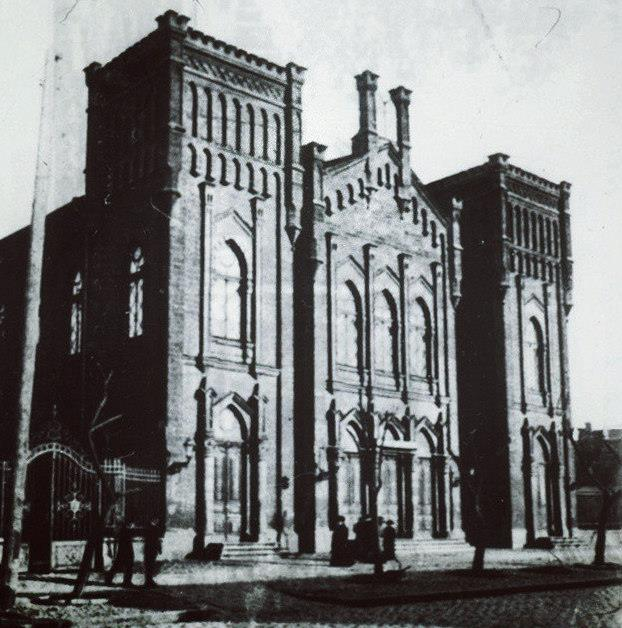
Cold Synagogue

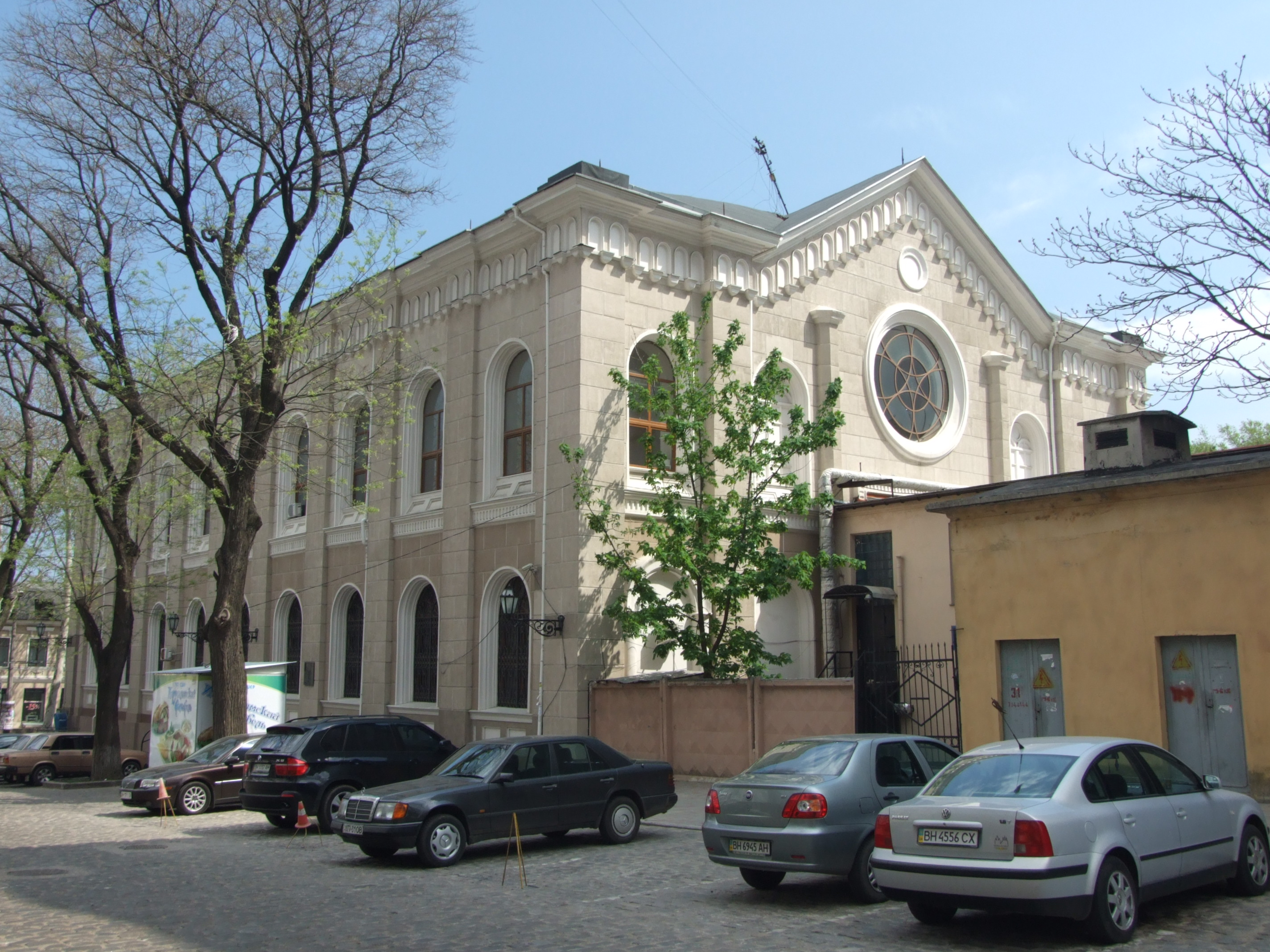
Ohr Somayach Synagogue

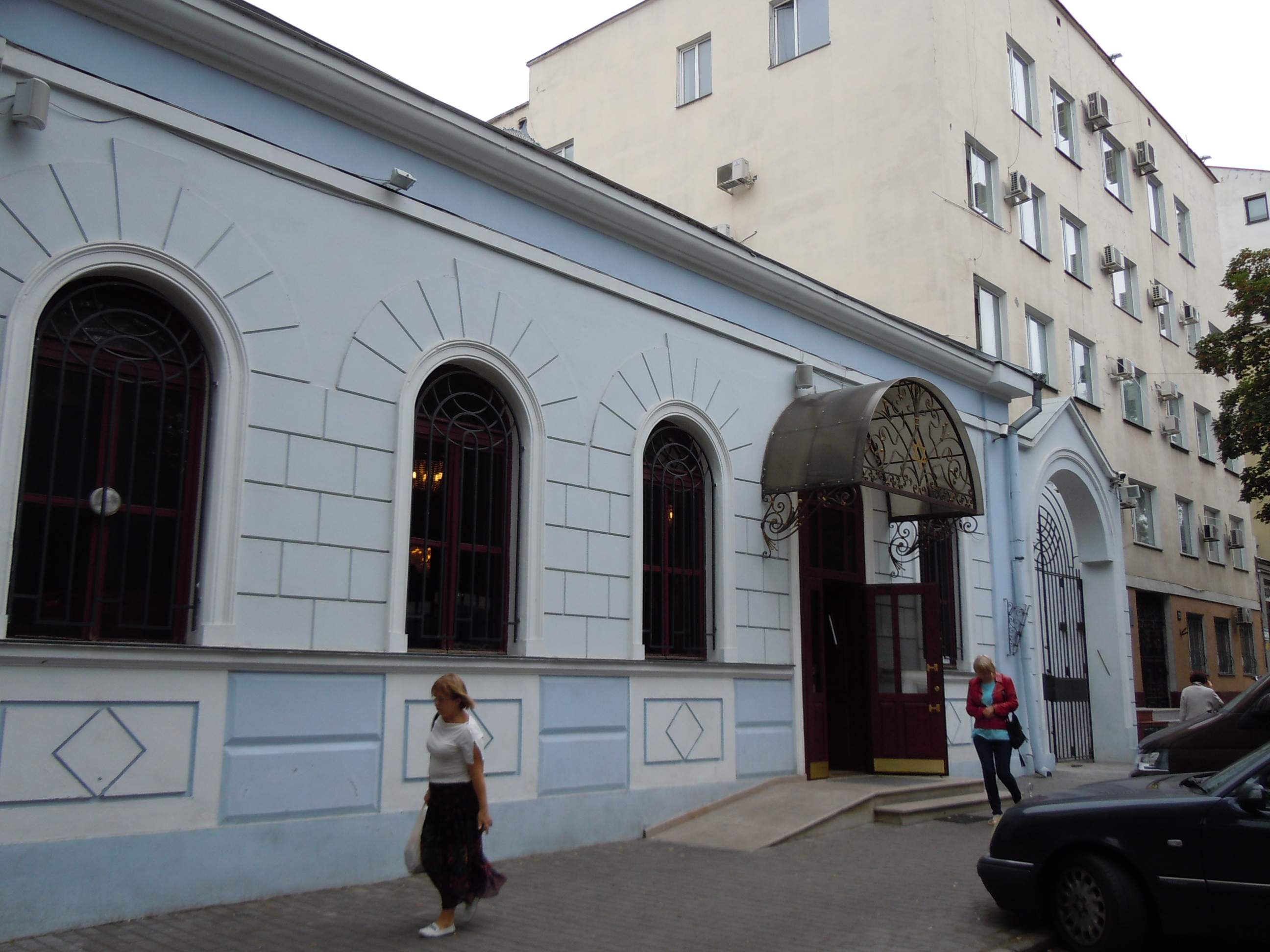
Beit Chabad Synagogue

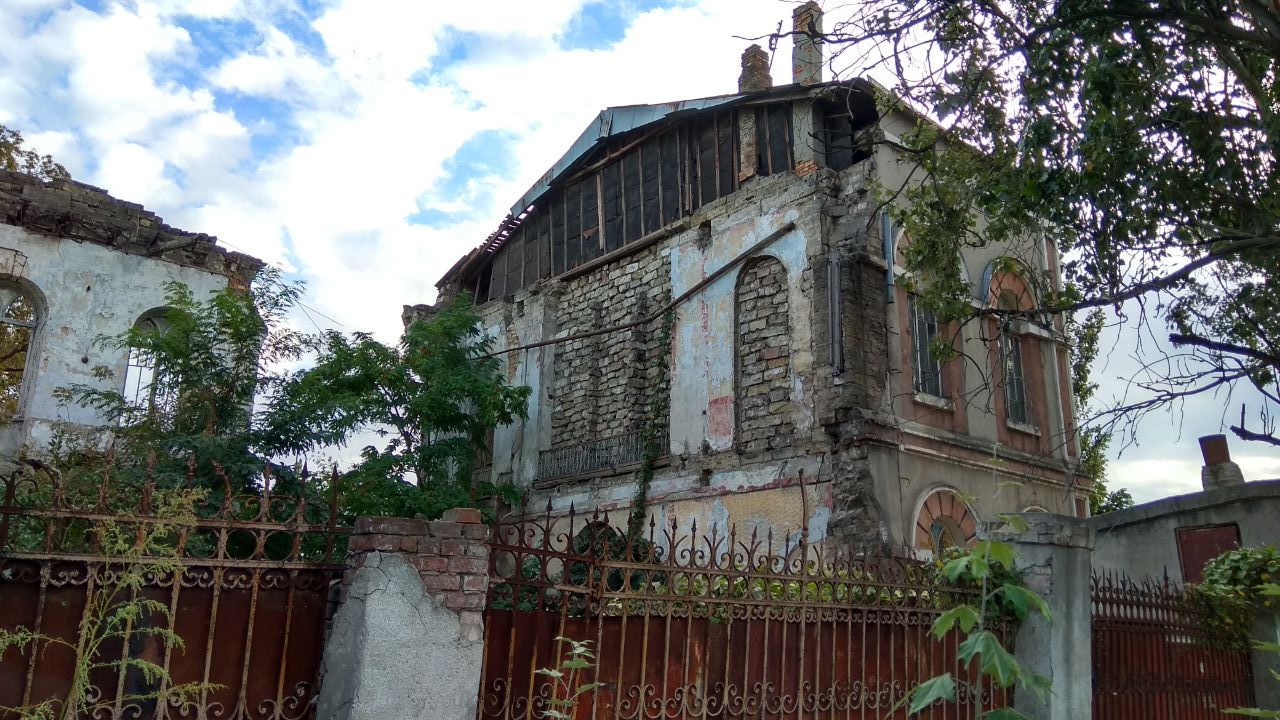
Nakhlas Elieser Synagogue

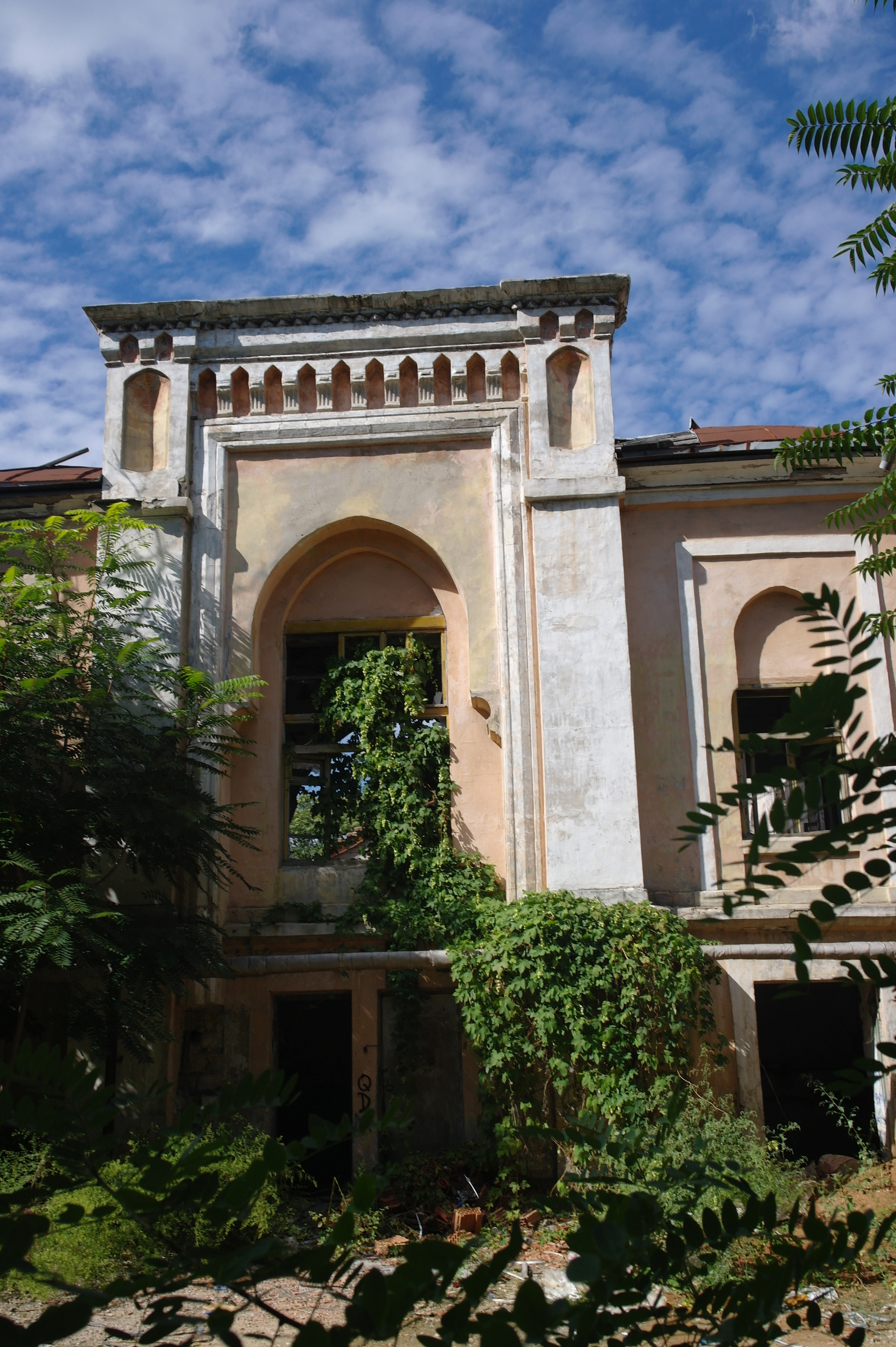
New Market Synagogue

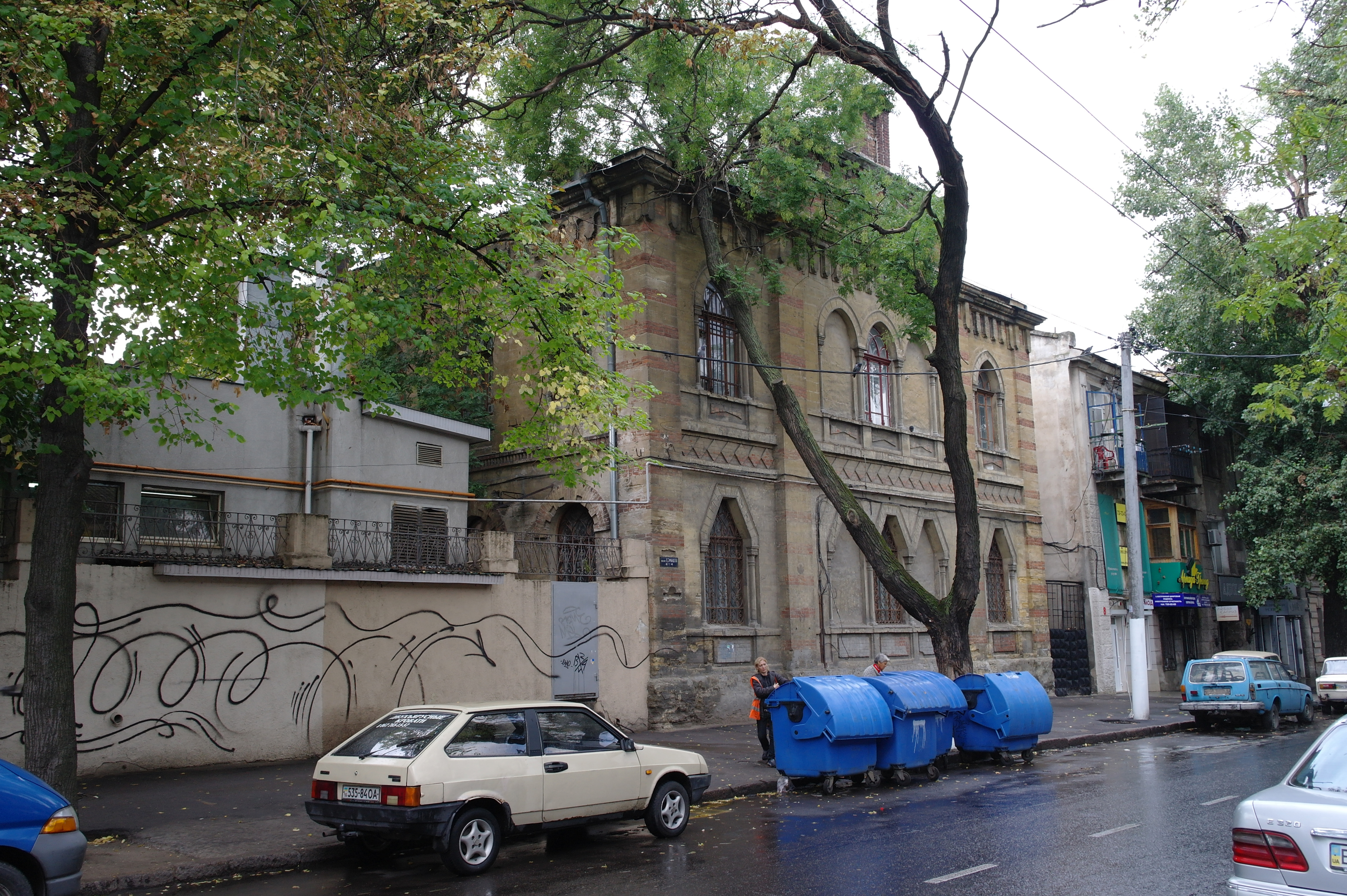
Synagogue on Mala Arnautska

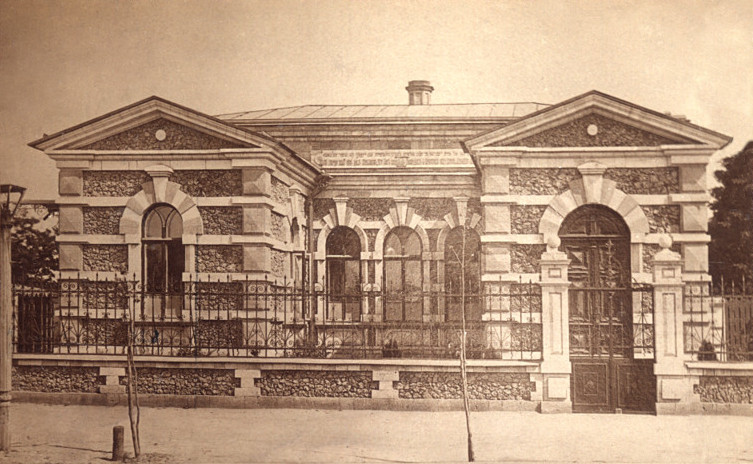
Synagogue at Moldavanka

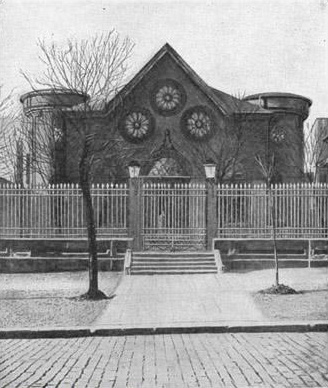
Karaite Kenesa

=== Other buildings ===
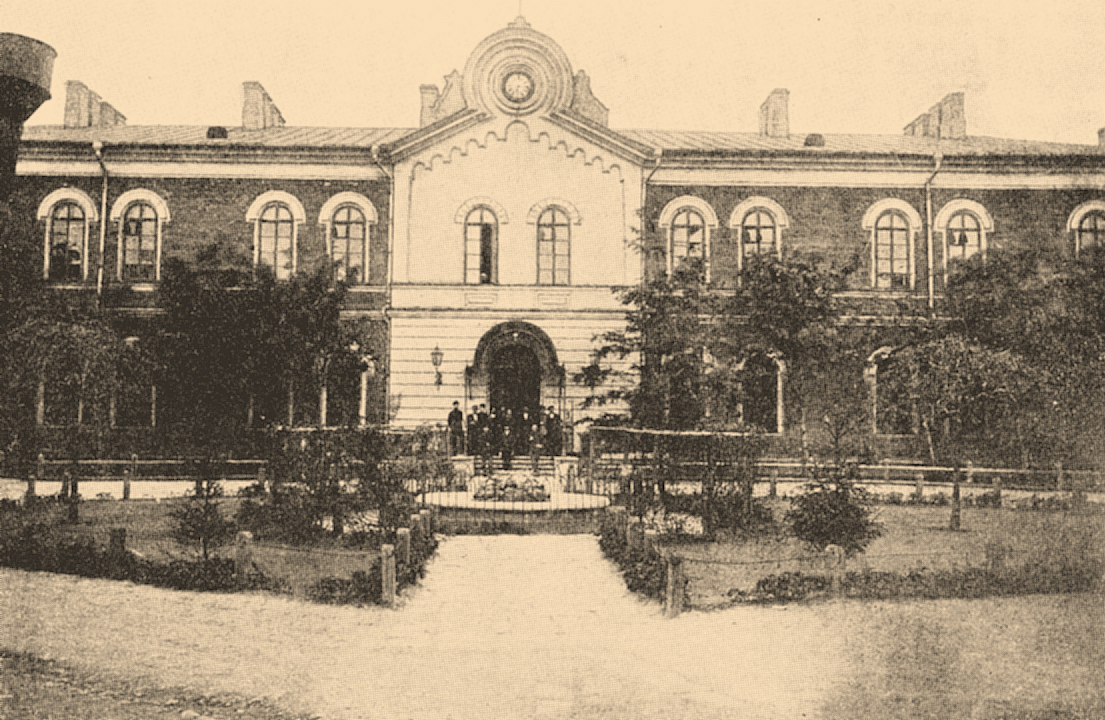
Main building of the Jewish Hospital in Odesa

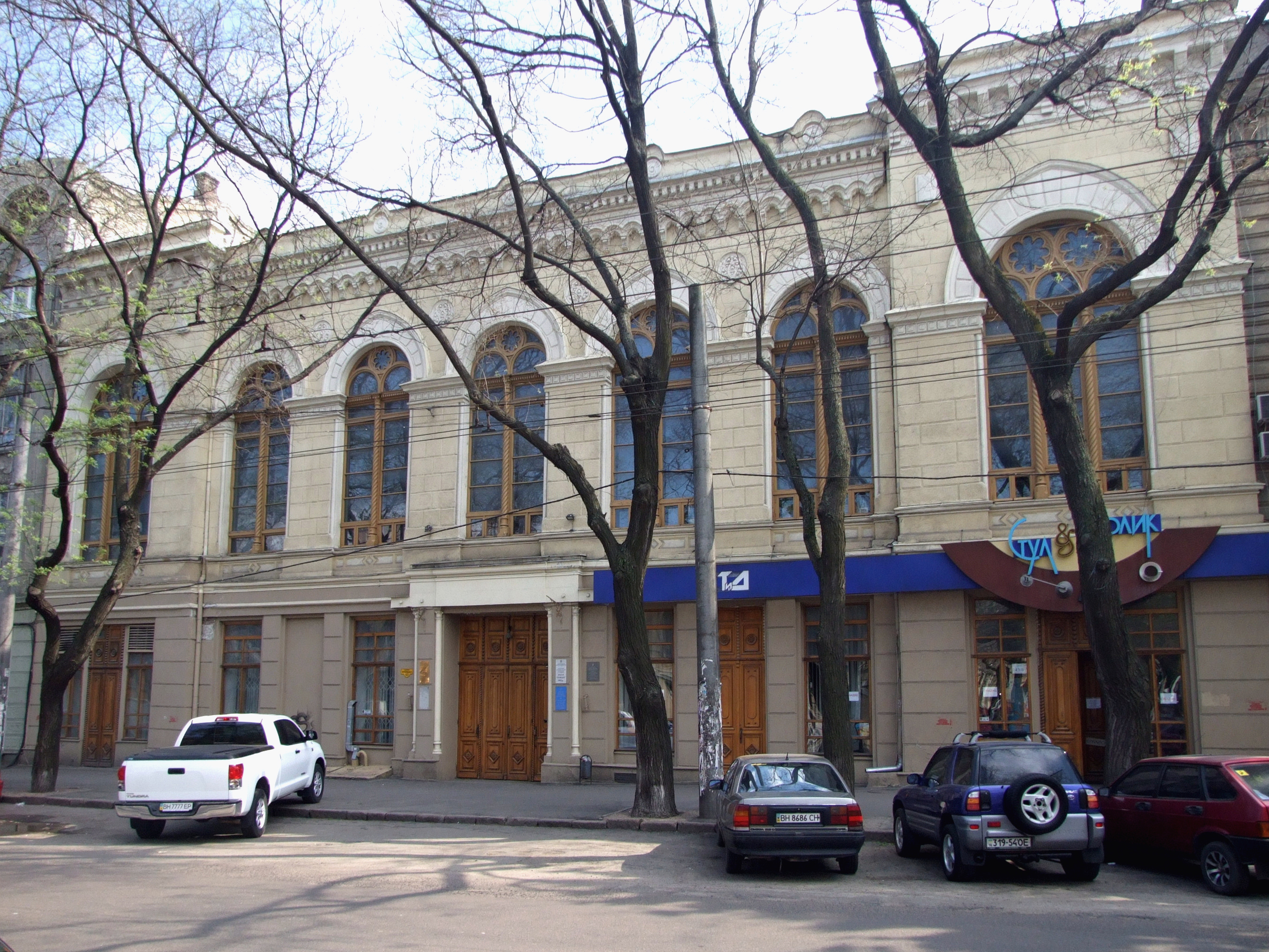
Union Concert Hall, built by the Mutual Association of Jewish clerks

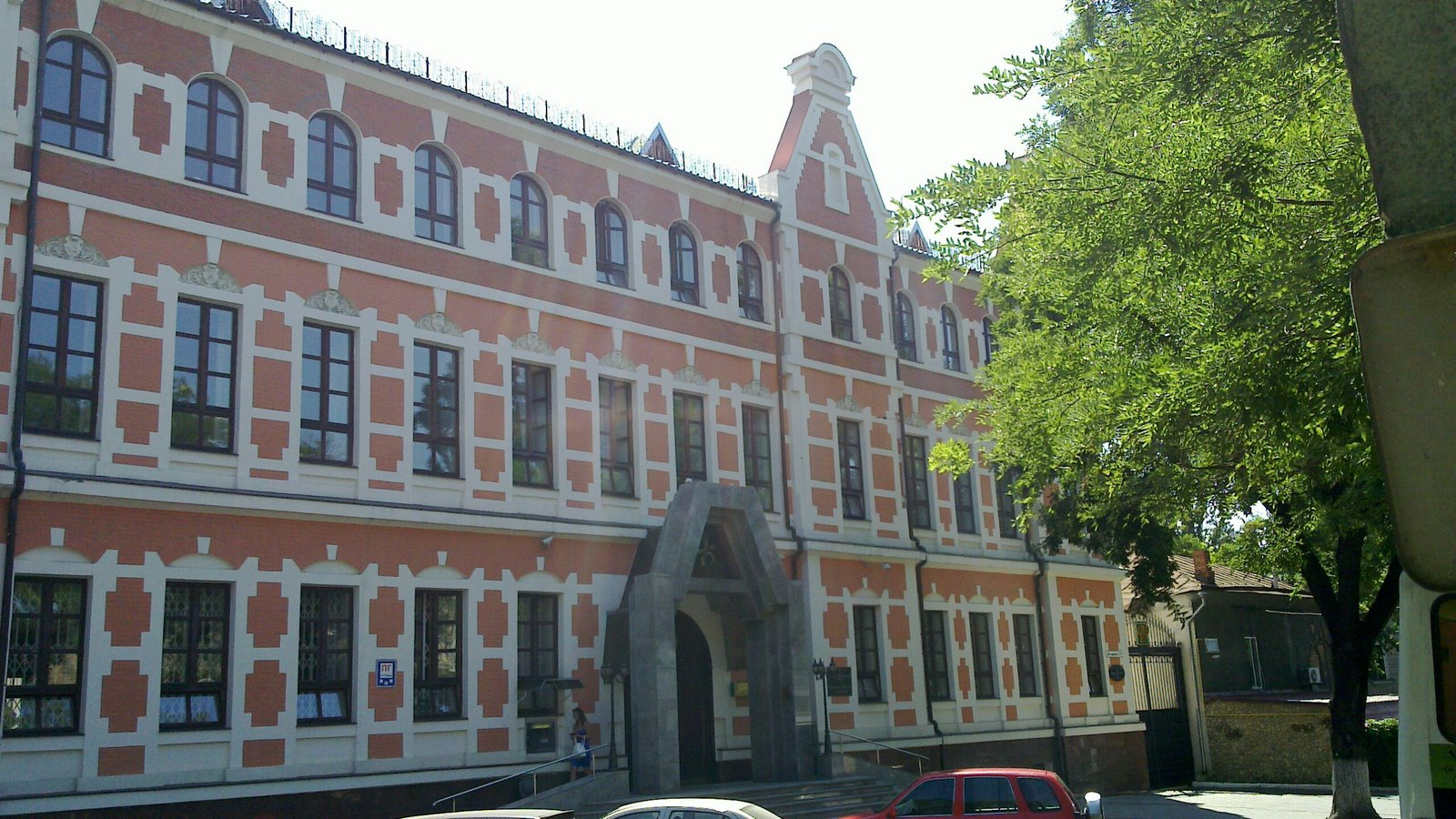
Building of former Trud Technical School

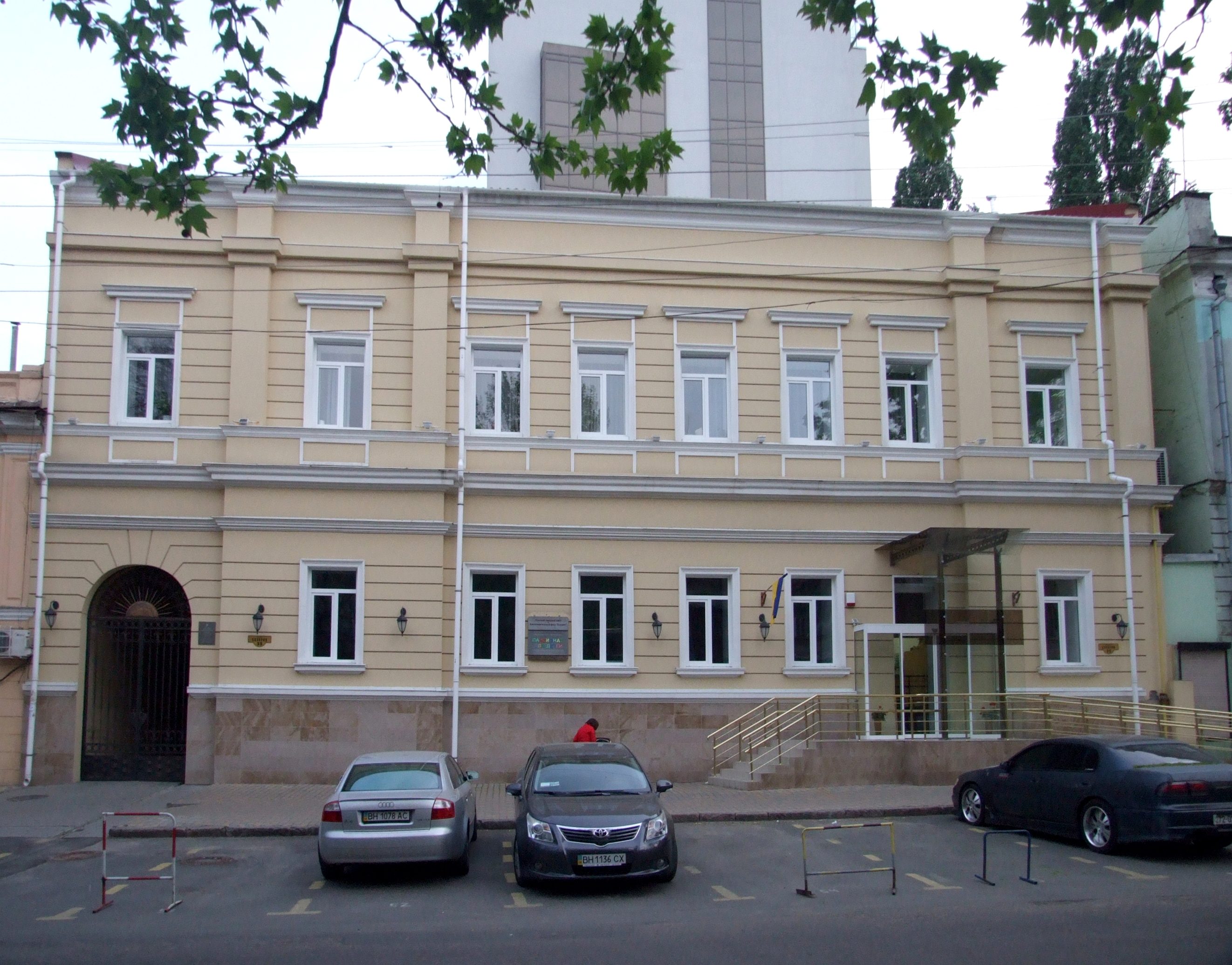
House of the Jewish Society

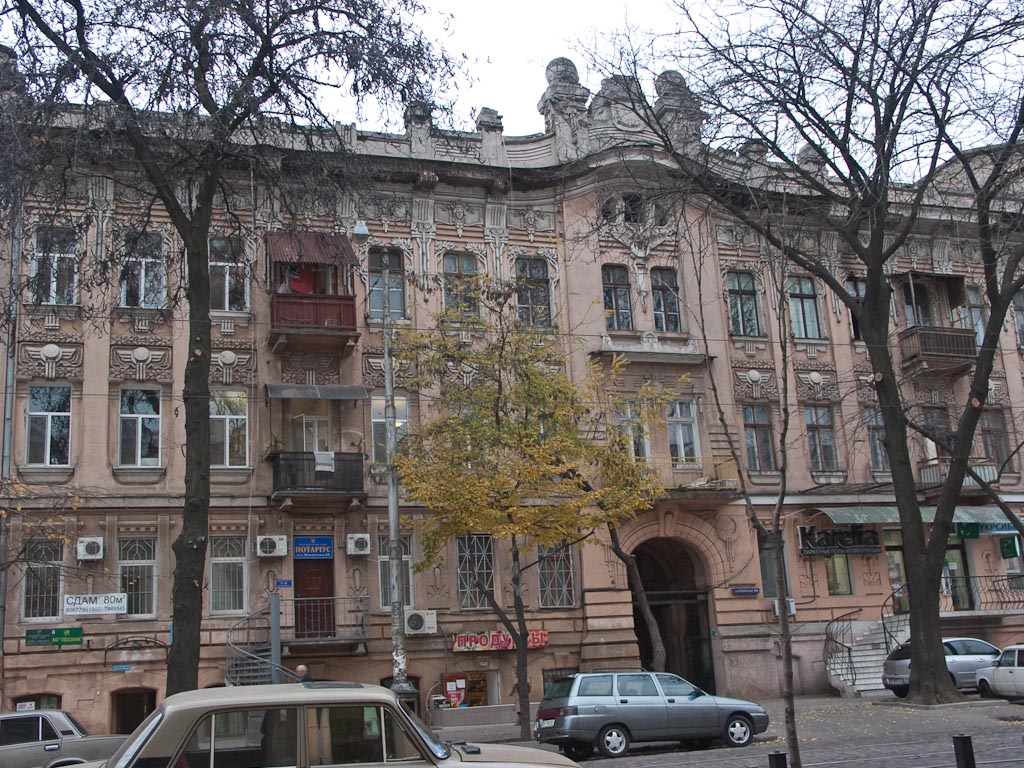
Museum of the History of Odesa Jews

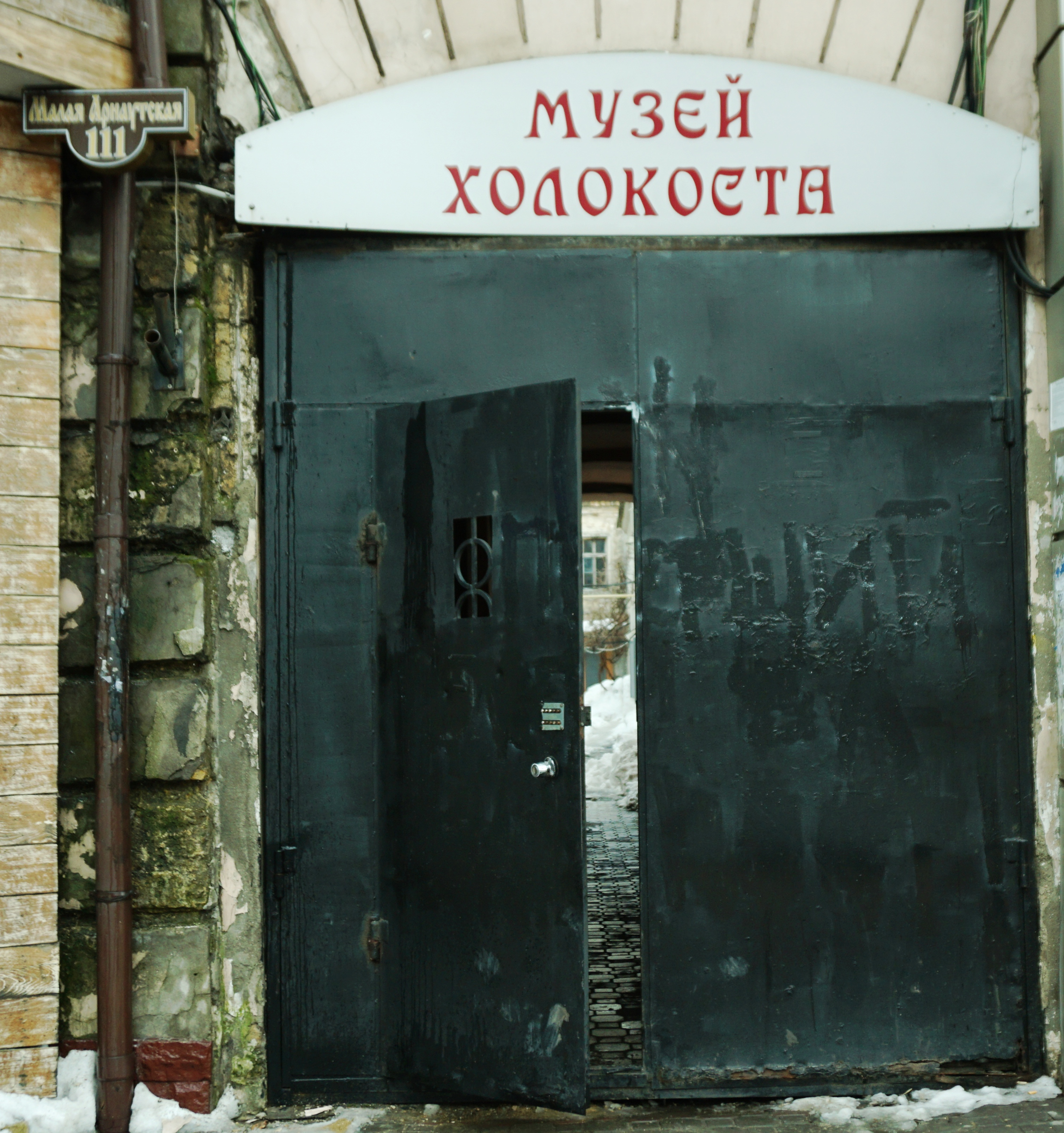
Holocaust Museum in Odesa

== See also ==
- History of the Jews in Ukraine
- SS Ruslan
- The Holocaust in Ukraine
