= Pavlo Kozlenko =

Ukrainian historian

- Козленко Павло Юхимович
- Born: 17 June 1970 (age 55); Odesa, Ukrainian SSR, Soviet Union (now Ukraine)
- Citizenship: Ukraine
- Education: PhD
- Alma mater: National University Odesa Law Academy
- Occupations: Public figure, lawyer

Pavlo Kozlenko (born June 17, 1970, in Odesa) is a historian, lawyer, PhD, Honored Worker of Culture of Ukraine, researcher of the Holocaust and Jewish heritage during Roman occupation of Ukraine during World War II. Director of Odesa Holocaust – Victims of Fascism Museum, vice-president of Charity Foundation "Memory of Nazi Victims" (2011–2022), member of Coordination Council of Association of Jewish Organizations and Communities of Ukraine, member of the Public Council of the State Archives of Odesa Region, elected member Public Council under the Odesa Regional State Administration of 2 convocations, poet. He is an author of books, scientific articles, and exhibitions about history of Holocaust, a participant of ethnographic expeditions to the former places of compact residence of Jews in the South of Ukraine, an active community member. Acts as an official opponent at the defense of dissertations, a member of the jury of the city competition of the Department of Science and Education of the Odesa City Council for the professional skills of teachers "Tolerance - the lessons of the Holocaust". President of the Charitable Foundation "Pam’yat. Gidnist. Svoboda". Member of the editorial board of the newspaper "Dobroe delo".

== Biography ==
Pavlo Efimovich Kozlenko was born in 1970 in Odesa, Ukraine. He is a grandson of Aleksandr Kozlenko who was a famous school director and historian. Kozlenko graduated from The O.S. Popov Odesa National Academy of Telecommunications in 1996.

He was awarded a PhD by the South Ukrainian Pedagogical University named after K. D. Ushynsky in 2009 the topic of the dissertation was "The Moral Vector of Education as a Value-Semantic Imperative of the Spiritual Being of a Personality".

He earned master's degree in law from National University "Odesa Law Academy" in 2010. Kozlenko is an author of Odesa Holocaust Museum concept. A scientific and educational center and a library were opened at the museum.

Kozlenko is an author of Odesa Holocaust Museum concept. A scientific and educational center and a library were opened at the museum. Israeli Ambassador to Ukraine Michael Brodsky was deeply impressed by the visit to the museum - "This is a museum that is made from the heart, absolutely sincerely by people who did it disinterestedly. I think that such a museum deserves the best building in Odesa."

He organized several scientific and art competitions such as "The roads of Holocaust – the road to tolerance", "Everyone needs peace and friendship". He is also an author of multiple educational, cultural, and research programs on the history of Ukraine. He is an author of multiple exhibitions such as "Granite Holocaust", "On the other side of the line", "Buchenwald alarm bell", "Citizens of Romania – Righteous Among the Nations", "The documents of the period of Romanian occupation of Odesa 1941-1944 from the National archive of Odesa Region", “Survivors of SHOA”, “Priests and the Holocaust”, “Odesa – Paris – Auschwitz. "The destiny of an artist", "You are lucky, Black Sea…".

He is an initiator of the installation of a memorial plaque and a memorial sign to the victims of the Holocaust in the village. Gvozdavka −2 of the Lyubashevsky district of the Odesa region, a memorial to the prisoners of the Balta ghetto and the righteous people of the world in Balta, memorial plaques to the Hero of the Soviet Union General Kremer and the full cavalier of the Order of Glory Shapiro. In 2023, he was the author and curator of the exhibition “Cultural Genocide on the Territory of Transnistria”.

Kozlenko is a co-organizer of the first in Ukraine Congress of the Descendants of the Righteous Among the Nations, which was held on September 25–26, 2021 in the city of Dnipro in the world's largest Jewish center “Menorah”. He is also one of the organizers of annual scientific conference “The Holocaust and International Law”.

He is a member of the project of the United Jewish Community of Ukraine which installed memorials at the Jewish cemeteries of Lyubashevka, Peschan, Yasinovo.

Kozlenko was an initiator of the campaign "Children of the Holocaust - Children of the War in Donbass", as part of this campaign warm clothes and food were purchased for the children.

He took part in the filming of a documentary about the occupation of Odesa. The film was directed by Romanian director Florin Iepan. He met professors and students from the Bucharest university during his trip to Romania. He also took part in filming of several other documentaries such as «Истории спасения» (“Stories about rescue” (Ukraine)) by Marina Dubrovina, “Маленькая Одесса” (“Little Odessa” (USA)) by Katya Balandin, “За Нистру” (“For Nistra” (Israel)) by Boris Maftsir, and a documentary by Korean director Brad Kim, documentary by National Television of Romania, “The Secrets of Great Ukrainians” by Daria Sarycheva.

For many years, he sued the public company "Ukrtelecom" for the building of the former Savran synagogue in Balta. He took part in the purchase of the building from the public company Ukrtelecom. Actively engaged in the restoration of the Savran synagogue and the creation of a museum of the history of the Jews.

He is a chairman of the Board of Trustees of the Balta Jewish Religious Community.

Kozlenko's books can be found in the US Library of Congress, New York Public Library (USA), libraries of the Holocaust Memorial Museum in Washington (USA) and Yad Vashem (Israel), the Bavarian State Library (Germany), National Library of Israel, the Odesa National Scientific Library.

Initiator of the issue of a postage stamp and an envelope dedicated to the International Day of Remembrance of the Victims of the Holocaust.

== Awards ==
- Honorary Diploma of the Cabinet of Ministers of Ukraine
- Badge of Honor of the Chairman of the Odesa Regional State Administration
- Badge of Honor "Podyaka" of the Odesa Mayor
- Diploma of the Odesa Border Detachment, diploma of the Department of Defense Work of the Odesa City Council
- Badge of Honor “Trudova Slava” (“Labor Glory”) of the Odesa Mayor
- Medal "For Sacrifice and Love of Ukraine” Orthodox Church of Ukraine
- Badge of Honor “For Cooperation" of the Odesa Regional Territorial Center for Recruitment and Social Support” (Regional Military Commissariat)
- Badge of the Commander of the Operational Command "YUG" - "For Merit”, awarded for volunteering activities
- US 6th Fleet Certificate for "SEA BREEZE 2017”, awarder for volunteering activities
- Diploma of the Verkhovna Rada of Ukraine (January, 2022)

== Publications ==
=== Books ===
- “Long road of summer...” - Odesa: Druk, 2011. — 345 p.
- Historical and information reference book “Geography of the Catastrophe. Part 1” (2014)
- “Odessa. Documents and evidence.1941-1944” - Odesa: Simeks-print, 2015.- 402p.
- “On the other side of the line: stories of salvation” - Odesa: Simeks-print, 2015. - 352 p.
- Monograph “Existential Foundations of the Jewish Agricultural Colonies of the Baltsky Uyezd, Podolsk Governorate” (2017) Odesa "Ecology" 190 pp.
- Collection “Herman Pyntya. A celebration of justice. My dossier.” Odesa, "Phoenix'' 2019—257 pages.
- “Balta-city from my childhood” - Odesa: Phoenix, 2022. - 575 p.

=== Publications ===
Author of over 40 publications, including:

- Principles and facts in scientific theory / P. E. Kozlenko // New in science and practice. - 2005. - No. 2 (25). - P. 47–49
- On the mechanisms of substantiation of the rationalization of the normative content of education / P. E. Kozlenko // Prospects. - 2005. - No. 4. - S. 40–44.
- Moral values as the backbone of the content of education " / P. E. Kozlenko // Science of knowledge: methodology and technology. - 2005. - Vp. 2 (16). - P. 84-87
- Morality as a value-semantic modus of education /P. E. Kozlenko // Innovations in technology and methodology of scientific knowledge: materials of international. Sciences. Conf. (Odesa, 26–27 July 2006). - Odesa: PDPU im. K. D. Ushinsky. — S. 68-70.
- Education as a channel for the transmission of moral values: zb. Sciences. worker / O. P. Punchenko, P. E. Kozlenko / vіdp. ed. I. V. Shramko. -Vip.8.- Kriviy Rig: Vidavnichiy dim, 2007. — P.215-224.
- To the 70th anniversary of the organization of the partisan movement in the Baltsky district of the Odesa region // Narodna tribune. - No. 15 (11997). — 2012.
- His life is “Orchestral Styles” // Narodna Tribuna. — 2013.
- Information resources of society: essence, structure, forms of representation and role in social development (Science knowledge: methodology and technology: Philosophy. — 2014. — VIP. 2. — P. 129)
- For a horseshoe to “bring” good luck, you need to work hard like a horse... Notes on Jewish History Online Magazine No. 11-12 (188) November–December 2015.
- World class architect. — Historical Midrashim of the Northern Black Sea Region. Materials of the III international scientific-practical conference. Volume II - P.249-259.
- Life and scientific heritage of Lev Isaevich Aikhenvald. — Historical Midrashim of the Northern Black Sea Region. Materials of the IV international scientific-practical conference. Volume II - P.111-124
- Prerequisites for the formation and history of the existence of the Jewish agricultural colony Pokutino. — Historical Midrashim of the Northern Black Sea Region. Materials of the V international scientific-practical conference. Volume I - P.154-169.
- Captain of the first rank. - Historical midrashim of the Northern Black Sea region. Materials of the V international scientific-practical conference. Volume II. — P.162-172.
- "Georg Leibbrandt and the Wannsee Conference".
- What is common between the city of Tel Aviv and the Ukrainian city of Balta? — about the life and work of Menachem Sheinkin.
- "To the 130th anniversary of the birth of Yakov Antonovich Kozlenko".
- "Savran Rebbe" - online magazine "Notes on Jewish History".
- Mother and son: how Bluma Moshkovna searched for her Avrum for twenty years.
- Lipa Alterovich Inzlikhin - cantor of the Baltic Synagogue.

== See also ==
- Sergey Nazarov
- Dmytro Dikusar

== Links ==
- «По ту сторону черты» — выставка о Праведниках мира
- Презентация книги Павла Козленко «По другую сторону черты»
- Odessa : dokumenty i svidetelʹstva, 1941—1944 / Pavlo Kozlenko
- «География Катастрофы»
- Тихий подвиг. Румыны — «праведники народов мира»
- Транснистрия: забытый Холокост
- В Одессе к 65-летию освобождения узников гетто и концлагерей пройдет Международная конференция
- В Одессе проходит Международный семинар о Холокосте
- Мэр наградил директора музея Холокоста
- Про нагородження Почесною грамотою виконавчого комітету Одеської міської ради (укр.)
- Козленко, Павел Ефимович — Долгая дорога лета…
- Мемориал памяти узников гетто открыли в Балте
- В ОДЕССКОЙ ОБЛАСТИ ОТКРЫТ ПАМЯТНИК ЖЕРТВАМ ХОЛОКОСТА
