= Museum of the History of Odesa Jews =

Jewish museum in Odesa

Museum of the History of the Jews in Odesa
- Музей історії євреїв Одеси "Мігдаль-Шорашим"
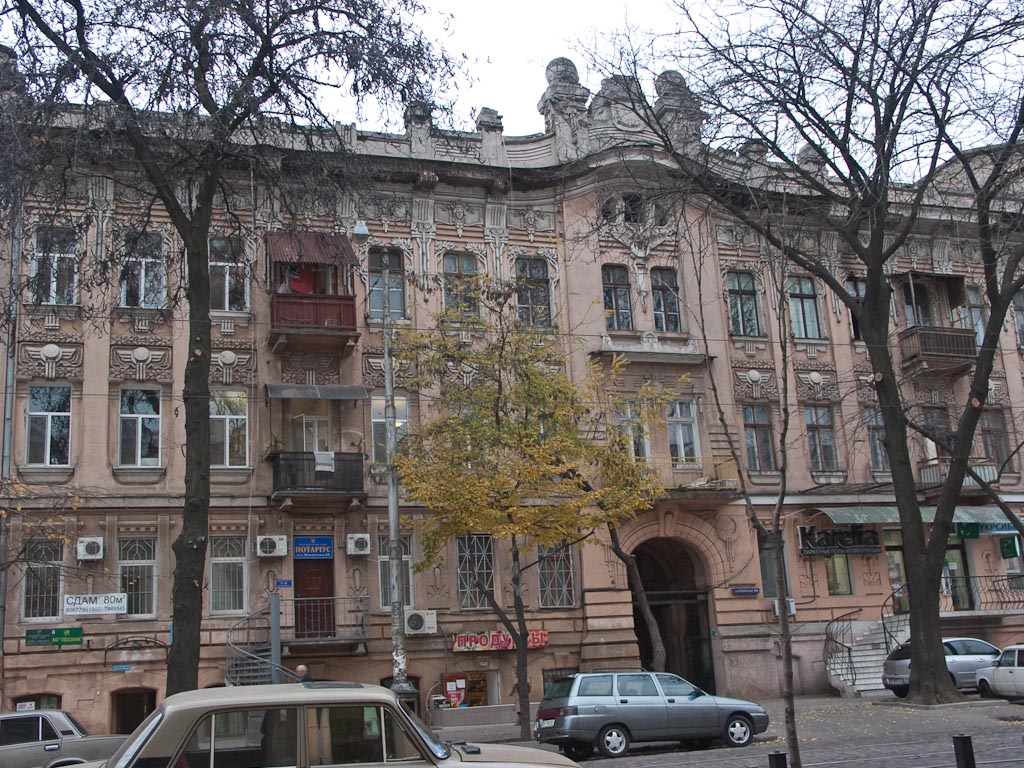

- Location of the museum in the Odesa Oblast
- Established: December 12, 2002
- Location: Odesa, Odesa Oblast, Ukraine
- Coordinates: 46°28′49″N 30°43′49″E
- Type: History museum
- Collection size: 13,000
- Director: Mykhailo Rashkovetskyi
- Website: jewishmuseum.org.ua

Immovable Monument of Local Significance of Ukraine
- Official name: Будинок житловий (Residential house)
- Type: Architecture, Urban Planning
- Reference no.: 527-Од

The Museum of the History of Odesa Jews (Ukrainian: Музей історії євреїв Одеси, romanized: Muzey istoriyi yevreyiv Odesi) or the Migdal-Shorashim (Ukrainian: Мігдаль-Шорашим) is a historical museum in Odesa, Ukraine. It reflects the history of the Jews from their first settlement in Odesa to their impacts in the city in the modern age. It is located on 66 Nezhinskaya Street.

== Details ==
The museum opened on November 12, 2002 in a former apartment building, and was founded by the Migdal Jewish Community Center. At its founding, it was the first Jewish museum in a post-Soviet nation. The building is listed as #51-101-0776 on the State Register of Immovable Landmarks of Ukraine. It is a nonprofit and relies on visitor donations.

It has a collection of over 13,000 items contained in 7 exhibitions. The location of the building is in close proximity to a formerly Jewish neighborhood of Odesa prior to the Holocaust.

== See also ==
- Holocaust Museum in Odesa
- History of the Jews in Odesa
