= Brodsky Synagogue =

Brodsky Synagogue may refer to the following Jewish synagogues:

- The Great Synagogue of Brody, established in 1742
- Brodsky Synagogue (Kyiv), financed by sugar magnate Lazar Brodsky
- Brodsky Synagogue (Odesa), founded by Jews from Brody.
