= Pinhas Minkowsky =

Russian composer

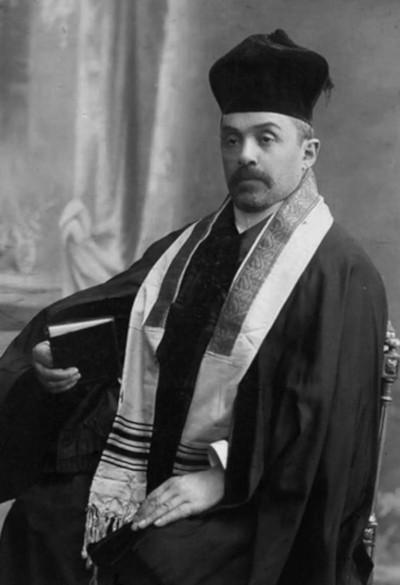

Personal life
- Born: April 5, 1859 Bila Tserkva, Kiev Governorate Russian Empire
- Died: January 18, 1924 (aged 64) Boston, Massachusetts, United States
- Buried: Har Nebo Cemetery, Philadelphia
- Occupation: Hazzan (tenor)

Religious life
- Religion: Judaism

Pinhas Minkowsky (Yiddish: פנחס מינקאווסקי; April 5, 1859 – January 18, 1924) was a Russian hazzan and composer.

== Biography ==
Phinehas Minkovsky was born in Bila Tserkva in April 1859. His father, Mordecai, a descendant of Yom-Tov Lipmann Heller, was cantor in the city's Great Synagogue, and he himself was a singer in his father's choir.

After having studied the Tanakh and Talmud under different teachers, Minkovsky continued his Talmudical studies alone in the bet hamidrash of his native town. At the age of eighteen he began to study Russian and German, and he mastered these two languages. His first teacher in vocal music was his father; later he studied it under Nissan Spivak, whom he succeeded as chief cantor of the Kishinev Choral Synagogue.

Minkovsky thereafter went to Vienna, where he continued his studies under Robert Fuchs, from whom he obtained a diploma as singer. He was afterwards successively cantor in Kherson and Lemberg. In 1881 he became cantor in Odessa (in the great synagogue), but soon departed for New York to work at the Kahal Adath Jeshurun synagogue. In 1892 he was called back to Odessa, where he served as cantor of the Broder Synagogue for thirty years until its closure by the Bolsheviks in 1922.

He returned to the United States in August 1923, dying there the following year at the age of 65. Over 1,000 people attended his memorial service on the Lower East Side, which included performances by Yossele Rosenblatt and other well-known cantors.

== Partial bibliography ==
- "Shirei ʻam" [Folk Music]. Ha-Shiloaḥ (in Hebrew). 5. Berlin: 10–20, 105–114, 205–216. 1899.
- Die Entwicklung der synagogalen Liturgie bis nach der Reformation des 19. Jahrhunderts [The Development of Synagogue Liturgy until after the Reformation of the Nineteenth Century] (in German). Odessa: Lewinsohn. 1902.
- Moderne Liturgie in underzere Sinagogn in Rusland [Modern Liturgy in Our Synagogues in Russia] (in Yiddish). Odessa: Ḥ. N. Bialik. 1910.
- Ein Vortrag von Oberkantor P. Minkowsky. Gehalten in dem Brody'er Tempel zu Odessa am Samstag, den 20 November 1910 zur Feier des 40-jährigen Jubiläums des Chordirigenten und Componisten Dawid Nowakowski (in German). Odessa: Ḥ. N. Bialik & S. Buryschkin. 1911.
