= Union Concert Hall, Odesa =

Building in Odesa, Ukraine

Coordinates: 46.4768°N 30.7361°E

Union Concert Hall
- Будинок концертного залу «Уніон»
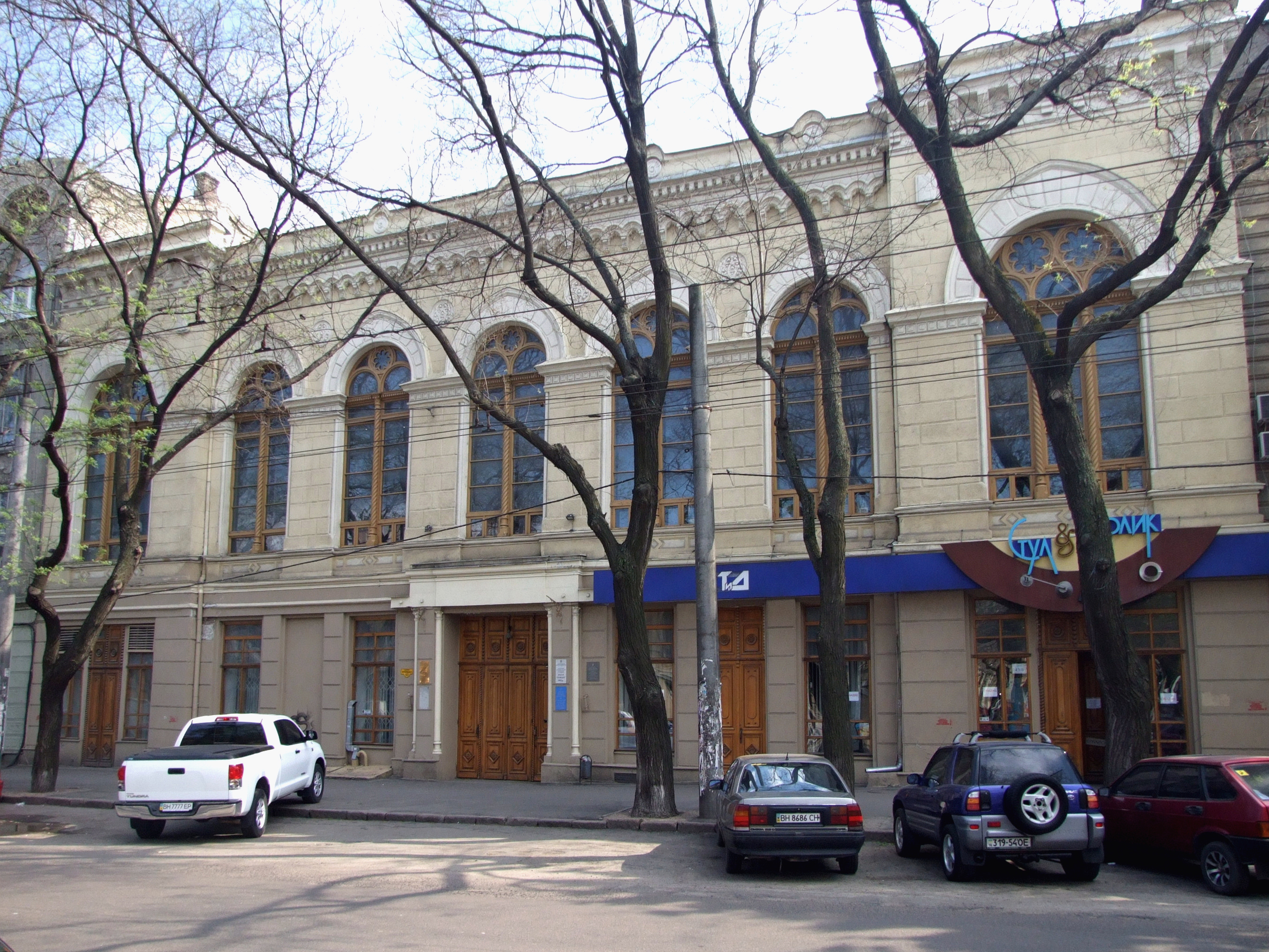
- view of the building
- Interactive map of the Union Concert Hall area

General information
- Location: Troitska Street, 43, Odesa, Ukraine

Immovable Monument of Local Significance of Ukraine
- Official name: Концертний зал “Уніон”, Товариство взаємної допомоги прикажчиків-євреїв арх. Ф.А.Троупянський, де 6-9 грудня 1911 р. проходили авторські концерти композитора А. Скрябіна; -19 березня 1925 р. на літературному вечері виступали поети М. Свєтлов і М. Голодний, письменник О. Югов (Union Concert Hall, the Society of Mutual Aid of Jewish Clerks, arch. F. A. Troupianskyi, where on 6–9 December 1911 the composer A. Scriabin's concerts took place, and on 19 March 1925, poets M. Svetlov and M. Holodnyi, and the writer O. Yugov performed at a literary dinner)
- Type: Architecture, Urban Planning, History
- Reference no.: 38-Од

The Union Concert Hall, Odesa is a public concert hall in Odesa, Ukraine built by the Mutual Association of Jewish clerks.

== History ==
It was designed by architects F. A. Troupyansky and A. R. Reyhenberg in 1901–1902. In 1899 David Tarnopol, head of the Society (1894–1905), decided to construct a more capacious building for the Association. In the same year he purchased a large plot of land on the corner of Trinity and Alexander street.

The project involved the construction of a building with rooms for classrooms, libraries, reading rooms and a concert hall. On 8 September 1902 the structure was consecrated.

The cost of construction was 222,173,134 rubles, while the value of domestic equipment was 9267.97 rubles.

== Performances ==
Composer Alexander Scriabin performed from 6–9 December 1911. At a literary evening on March 19, 1925, poets Svetlov M., M. Holodnyi and writer Yugov A. appeared.
