= Sergey Nazarov =

Ukrainian political strategist, former member of parliament, civic activist

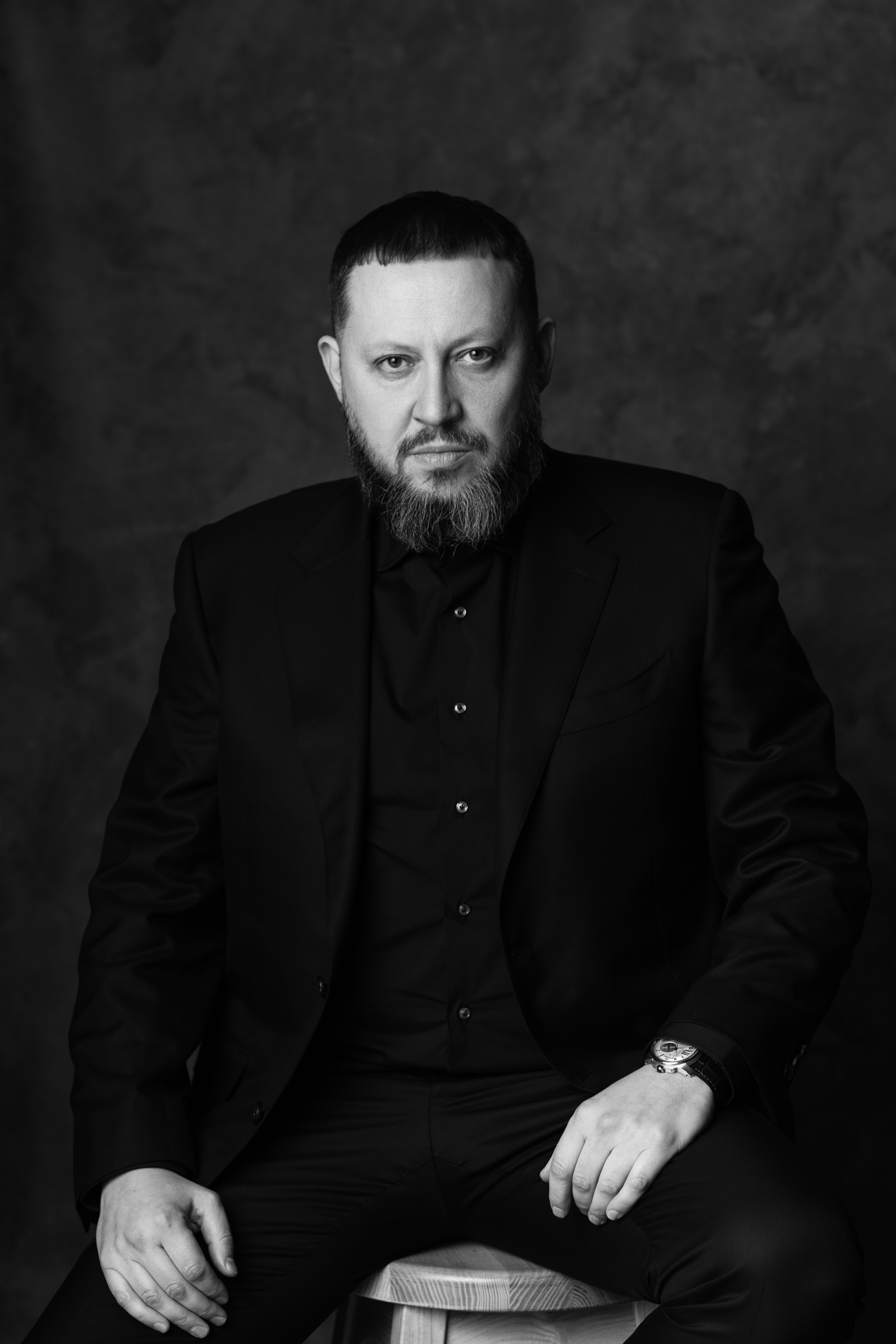
- Born: Leningrad, USSR
- Occupations: political strategist, civic activist, founder of GN Consulting; Ambassador of Odesa to the United Kingdom of Great Britain and Northern Ireland
- Known for: founder of GN Consulting
- Awards: Order of Odesa

Sergey Nazarov is a Ukrainian political strategist, civic activist, founder of GN Consulting, and public figure originally from Odesa.

== Career ==
In 2000, Sergey (or Serhiy) Nazarov started his political consulting and marketing career. In 2002, he served as an advisor to the Governor of the Odesa Regional State Administration, Serhiy Hrynevetskyi. From 2010 to 2012, he was an advisor to the Mayor of Odesa, Oleksiy Kostusyev. In 2014, he advised Odesa Mayor Gennadiy Trukhanov.

Since 2018, Sergey Nazarov founded GN Consulting, a communication agency specialising in political consulting and corporate culture. He serves as a political strategist and consultant to leading Ukrainian politicians and statesmen. Additionally, he is the Ambassador of Odesa to the United Kingdom. From 2018 to 2020, Sergey Nazarov produced the "First City" TV channel.

In 2022, he was awarded the Order of Odesa by the Odesa City Council.

SInce 2019, Sergey Nazarov and team of GN Consulting agency consulted and helped organize the LGBTQ+ Pride Parade in Odesa. Gender equality, human rights and individual freedom are fundamental principles which are an essential part of the corporate culture within the Agency and in partnership with civil society in Ukraine.

== Public activity ==
In 2018, Sergey Nazarov joined the Marazli Club (Odesa Art Museum) and received a diploma in 2019 for his contributions to the museum.

In 2019, Sergey Nazarov organized the first Odesa International Ecological Festival. In 2021, he organized the second Odesa International Ecological Festival and served as the General Producer of the seventh International Festival "Golden Violins of Odesa". Nazarov was also a partner of the Odessa Classics International Music Festival. In December 2021, he participated in the tenth Charity Diplomatic Christmas Market, gifted the "Garden of Life" sculpture to Greek Park in Odesa.

In July 2022, Nazarov organized Julian Milkis' charity concert. In 2022, he launched the social music project "CREATIVE FORCE," developed a nomination dossier for Odesa's UNESCO World Heritage status, and signed a Memorandum of Cooperation with Civitta. At the same year, he also developed a dossier for the Bureau International des Expositions (BIE) to host EXPO 2030 and curated the national project "It’s us." Additionally, he partnered in a social project for IDP children and organized an official visit of Tobias Ellwood, UK Parliament.

In 2023, Nazarov co-wrote a Memorandum of Cooperation for financial and technical assistance to Odesa. At the same year, he began volunteering with The Common Good Foundation. In 2023, he delivered a speech at the House of Lords, UK, on the prospects of post-war Odesa and its investment potential.
