= Brodsky Synagogue (Odesa) =

Former synagogue in Odesa, Ukraine

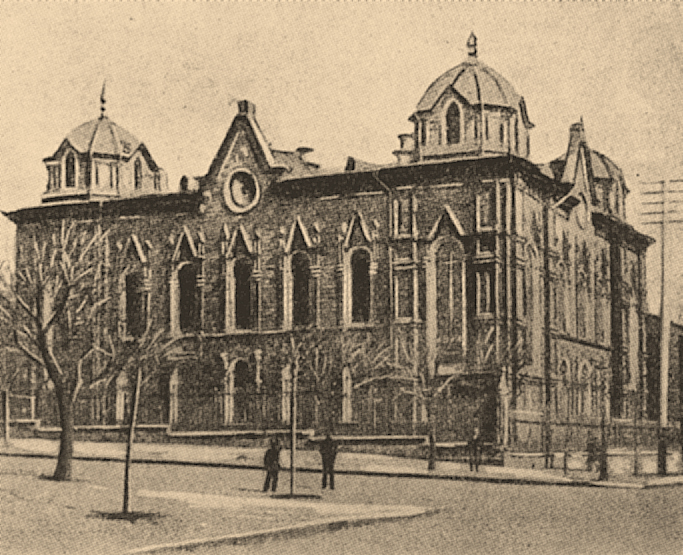

- Location of the synagogue in Ukraine

Religion
- Affiliation: Reform Judaism
- Ecclesiastical or organizational status: Synagogue (1868–1920s); State Archives (1930s–c. 2010s); Synagogue and Jewish museum (under restoration)
- Year consecrated: 10 April 1868
- Status: Under restoration

Location
- Location: Zhukovskoho Street 18, Odesa 65000
- Country: Ukraine
- Interactive map of Brodsky Synagogue
- Coordinates: 46°28′47″N 30°44′31″E

Architecture
- Architects: Joseph N. Kollovich (Osip Kolovich)
- Type: Synagogue architecture
- Style: Gothic Revival; Renaissance Revival
- Established: 1840s (as a congregation)
- Groundbreaking: 1863
- Completed: 1868

Specifications
- Dome: Four
- Materials: Limestone

Immovable Monument of Local Significance of Ukraine
- Official name: Будівля Бродської синагоги та огорожа (арх. Колович О.М.) (Building of the Brodsky Synagogue and its fence (arch. O. M. Kolovych)
- Type: Architecture, Urban Planning
- Reference no.: 698-Од

The Brodsky Synagogue is a Reform (Note: Upon restoration, the synagogue will become a place of worship for an Orthodox Chabad-Lubavitch congregation.) Jewish synagogue, located at Zhukovskoho Street 18, in Odesa, Ukraine.

Completed in 1868 by Jews from Brody, it was the first Reform synagogue and the first with an organ in the then Russian Empire, and the largest synagogue in what is now south Ukraine. The synagogue operated until 1920, (Note: Also claimed to be 1925, and 1927.) when it was closed by Soviet authorities and subsequently converted into Soviet government administration use as the Odessa State Archives. In 2016, the synagogue was handed back to the Jewish community to restore the building as an Orthodox synagogue and Jewish history museum.

During the peak of its activity, the synagogue attracted people came from all over the world to hear cantors sing.

== History ==
=== Early 1800s ===
In the early 1800s, Jewish immigrants began to stream into Odesa from Europe, many of them coming from the town of Brody in western Ukraine.

In the 1840s, the Brody Jews leased their first synagogue, at the corner of Pushkin and Postal (now Zhukovsky) streets in a relatively small house from the wealthy Greek businessman Ksenysu. The Cantor was Rabbi Nissan Blumenthal, who had also come from the town of Brody.

The reformation of synagogues was also one of the priorities of Maskilim in the city, the Brodsky Synagogue, soon become a model for Jewish prayer in the region. The older Glavnaia synagogue, formerly known as Beit Knesset Ha Gadol established in 1795 and located in main arteries of the city, was transformed on the lines of Brody Synagogue.

One of the documents from the Office of Novorossiysk and Bessarabian Governor-General, dated 1852, states: "All the educated people of the Jewish community in Odesa are going there. Their school leases a house, but it is deliberately arranged. The hall is quite extensive, there is also a gallery for the women…”

=== The new synagogue ===
In 1860, they received permission to begin building a new synagogue. It was designed by the famous architect Joseph N. Kollovich in the Gothic and Renaissance revival styles, built with local limestone, and completed in 1868. It was the largest synagogue in the south of the then Russian empire.

Many famous composers and singers performed in the synagogue. Among them was David Novakovsky, a composer, and Cantor Pinhas Minkowsky.

The synagogue is mentioned in writings of Isaac Babel, Sholem Aleichem, and Ivan Bunin (the first Russian writer to win the Nobel Prize for Literature). Ze'ev Jabotinsky, and Meir Dizengoff, former mayor of Tel Aviv, are among the many Jews associated with this synagogue.

In 1897, Jews made up 34.6% of the city's population, making Odesa was the second-largest Jewish city, after Warsaw.

=== The Soviet era and World War II ===
In 1920, all the synagogues in Odesa were taken away from the Jewish community. In 1925, the Brody Synagogue was turned into the Rosa Luxemburg Workers Club, which was a meeting place to push socialist propaganda. The Ten Commandments over the synagogue's ark were covered with a photo of Lenin.

In 1939, the Jewish population of Odesa had numbered 80,000 to 90,000, but by 1945 only 5,000 remained.

During World War II, Adolf Hitler requested Romanian leader Ion Antonescu to occupy the Ukrainian territory between Dniester and Bug Rivers. In those days, the Odesa Oblast State Archive was located in the basement of the Uspensky cathedral. The Romanians moved the archive into the Brodsky Synagogue.

== Recent history ==
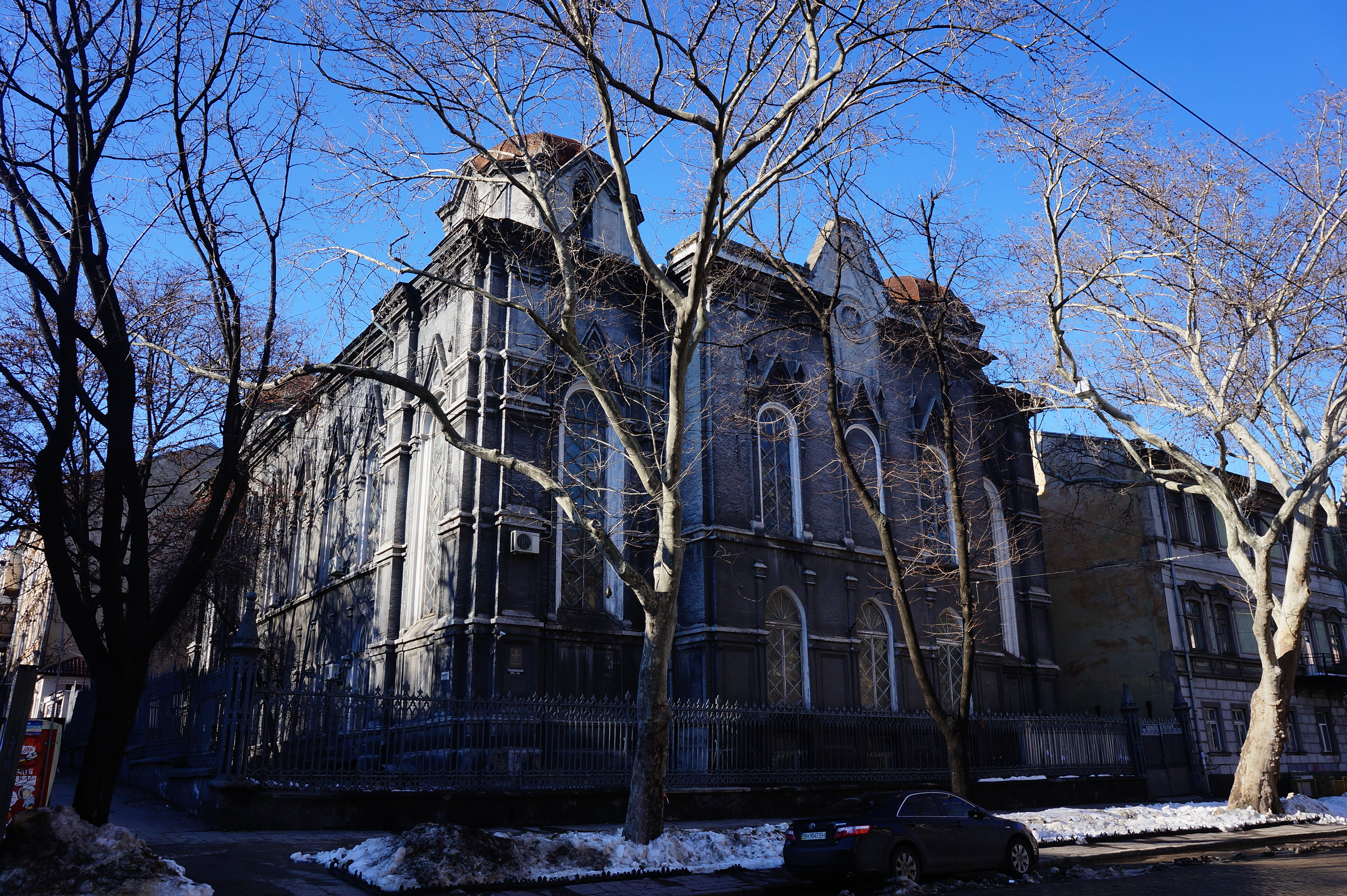
The synagogue in 2016

In August 1985, the Odesa Oblast Council established the Brodsky Synagogue as a monument of local importance. In June 2006, the Ministry of Culture and Tourism of Ukraine included the building in the State Register of Monuments of Ukraine.

In August 2015, the building was on the verge of collapse and had not been renovated for many years. The walls were held by the bookshelves inside.

As of February 2016, the Brodsky Synagogue was returned to the Jewish Community of Odesa. The decision was reached by a decisive majority of the regional council who voted to transfer the building taken from its community nearly 100 years ago. The building, once restored, will house an Orthodox Chabad-Lubavitch congregation and the Odesa Jewish Museum and Tolerance Center. When restored, it is expected that the Chief Rabbi of Odesa and Southern Ukraine, Avraham Wolff, will lead the congregation.

== See also ==
- History of the Jews in Ukraine
- List of synagogues in Ukraine
