= Holocaust Museum in Odesa =

Non-state museum on the Holocaust in Ukraine

The Holocaust Museum in Odesa
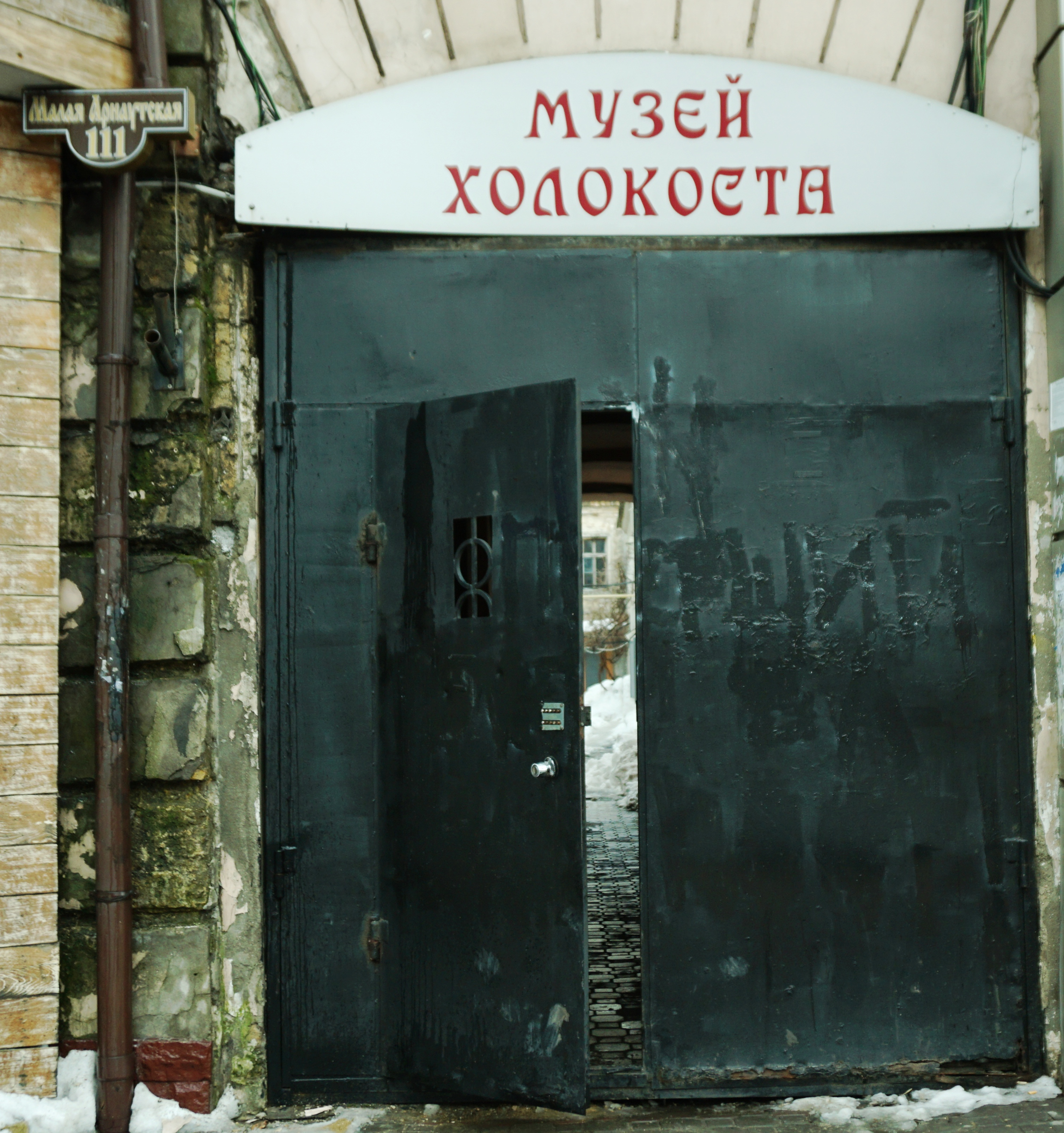
- Location: Odesa, Ukraine
- Coordinates: 46°28′18″N 30°43′54″E
- Website: Official website

Museum of the Holocaust – victims of fascism, Odesa (Ukrainian: Музей "Голокосту – жертв фашизму", Одеса, romanized: Muzey "Holokostu – zhertv fashyzmu", Odesa) – the first Museum in Ukraine, which is based on the events of the genocide of the Jewish population in Transnistria Governorate (the territories which were from 1941 to 1943 under jurisdiction of Romania and occupied Odesa, Mykolaiv and part of Vinnytsia Oblast).

== History ==
In 1995, the idea arose to create a museum of the Holocaust in Odesa. It was proposed by two former prisoners of the ghetto and concentration camps: President of the Association "Ukraine-Israel" and former prisoner of the concentration camp in Domanivka Dmitry Gutakhov, and former prisoner of fascism Nilva Efim.

Fourteen years later, by the decision of the Council of Odesa regional Association of Jews—former prisoners of ghettos and Nazi concentration camps (Chairman of the Association – Shvartsman Roman Markovich), the museum officially opened on 22 June 2009.

On the opening day of the Museum, the head of the society "Ukraine – Israel" Dmitry Gutakhov, in his speech noted:

Holocaust Museum in Odesa is an important milestone on the way of memory.

The opening date of the Museum is symbolic. On 22 June 1941, Nazi Germany attacked the Soviet Union. Blitzkrieg on the eastern front was not only about instant military victory, it was also (if not mostly) about genocide and war crimes. Nazi Germany wanted to kill or enslave all of the Soviet Union's population, just like they were (trying) to do in Poland since 1 September 1939. Terrible war crimes were committed by both the SS groups just like the Wehrmacht. All Slavic, Roma, Jewish (hated the most by Nazis) and other people were considered by brainwashed Germans as subhumans, hence undeserving of rights and dignity. Those who could not work for their "masters" from "master Aryan race" (Germans) and become their slaves were to be exterminated.

By decision of the Council of the Odesa Regional Association of Jews-former prisoners of the ghetto and Nazi concentration camps, Sabulis Victor Franzevich was appointed the first director of the museum.

On the eve of the opening of the museum Roman Markovich Shvartsman said:

We have long dreamed of creating such a museum, collecting everything that speaks about that time.

== Exhibits and Exposition ==
Initially in two halls of the museum about one and a half thousand exhibits were exposed: photos, documents, tablets and exhibits – witnesses of that time, a large part from which is taken from private collections of the Odesa Jews brought by former prisoners.

A significant part of the exposition was transferred to the museum from Chicago, US, now the late native of Odesa, former prisoner of the ghetto Lev Dumer.

All exhibits are genuine, dedicated to Odesa citizens – former prisoners of concentration camps and ghettos, 400 of whom were lucky enough to survive the nightmares of the Holocaust. These are graphic images, photographs, and relics, and photo documents about the horrors experienced during the Second World War by Jewish residents of Odesa and the region. One particularly painful exhibit is the rope with which the Nazis hanged a young girl. It was given to the museum by a man who, at that time, a boy, was in love with that girl.

Today, the Holocaust Museum is a two-story complex, which houses a research library, a training center and a memorial space.

=== Exhibits ===
Initially, the exhibition gives an overview of the Holocaust, and then focuses on the fate of the Jews of Odesa and Transnistria. In addition to the permanent exhibition, the museum offers audio and video interviews, a library and a memorial room.

The permanent exhibition covers five halls of the Museum.

- Hall of the library, which presents literature related to the history of the Holocaust, historical documents, artifacts, historical and personal photos, oral and video history, personal belongings of former prisoners of concentration camps and ghettos.
- Hall, which presents the history of the occupation of the fascists in Europe, and after the Odesa Oblast. Here is a video card of the Transnistria, where death camps, labor camps and ghettos are marked.
- Hall, which tells the story of the typical life of the pre-war Jewish family in Shtetl, so used to be called small town.
- Hall of the Righteous Among the Nations. Here are photos, awards, personal belongings of the Righteous of the peoples of the world of Odesa Oblast.
- Hall of Victory. Here are pictures of military officers, sailors, heroes of the USSR, who participated in the liberation of the Odesa Oblast from the Nazi invaders, during the Second World War.

=== Exposition ===
The Museum also presents traveling exhibitions, where you can see Roma, Bulgarian Jews, former prisoners of ghettos and Romanian concentration camps.

By the 75th anniversary of the occupation of Odesa during the Second World War, the Holocaust museum presented the exhibition "Documents of the Romanian occupation of Odesa 1941–1944 from the state archives of Odesa region".

In January 2012, the international day of commemoration in memory of the victims of the Holocaust saw the opening of an exhibition of photographs entitled "Holocaust in granite". The photographs reveal the tragedy of the Holocaust. The exhibition is devoted to the tragic fate of the Jews of Odesa, Bessarabia and Bukovina, destroyed by the Romanian occupiers in 1941–1944 on the territory between the Southern Bug and the Dniester. The photos, which formed the basis of the exhibition, were taken from expeditions carried out in the period from 2011 to 2012. The expeditions are part of a major long-term project launched by the Odesa Holocaust Museum.

In 2017 the mini-diorama "Ghetto in Transnistria" appeared in the museum's collection. It depicts a Jewish ghetto in the Odesa settlement, which was established by the occupiers in 1942. In it are almost 90 figures at 1/35th scale. The author of this project was the Odesa master-modeler Evgeniy Kapuka.

In 2018 the museum presented the exhibition "Priests and Holocaust", dedicated to those who opposed totalitarian regimes and mass crimes in the 20th and 21st centuries.

== Goals and objectives of the museum ==
The organizers of the museum set the main goal in the work of the museum: to collect, preserve and communicate to future generations the story of this unprecedented tragedy, to preserve the memory of those who suffered, to educate a new generation of young people who will be able to resist and prevent the emergence of fascism in the 21st century.

In his speech, Eduard Dolinsky, Director General of the Jewish Committee of Ukraine, noted:

The main mission of the museum is to promote knowledge about the Holocaust, preserve the memory of the victims and encourage reflection of the moral and spiritual issues posed by the Holocaust, during which 6 million Jews were destroyed by the Nazis.

Chairman of the Association of former prisoners of concentration camps and ghettos Roman Shvartsman said:

This museum should become a school, a university for young people, so that they understand what the Holocaust is.

Today, the Museum presents a fairly large collection of exhibits.

Since its opening, the Museum has been visited by more than 20 thousand people from around the world: ambassadors, diplomats, heads of cities and regions, students and schoolchildren, and people who remember or want to learn about the terrible tragedy that is called the Holocaust.

== Museum today ==
The author of the project of the information and historical reference book "Geography of the Holocaust", candidate of Philosophy, director of the Odesa Holocaust museum Pavel Efimovich Kozlenko remarked:

We are interested in the socio-cultural aspect of this problem. We want to show. How people in such conditions did not lose her human form.

Today, the Museum has a new concept, the most convenient and understandable for visitors, created by Pavel Kozlenko, with the help of the Odesa regional Association of Jews—former prisoners of the ghetto and Nazi concentration camps.

The Museum also collaborates with the Institute for the study of the Holocaust. Elie Wiesel (Romania).
