= Manfred Reifer =

- מנפרד מאיר רייפר
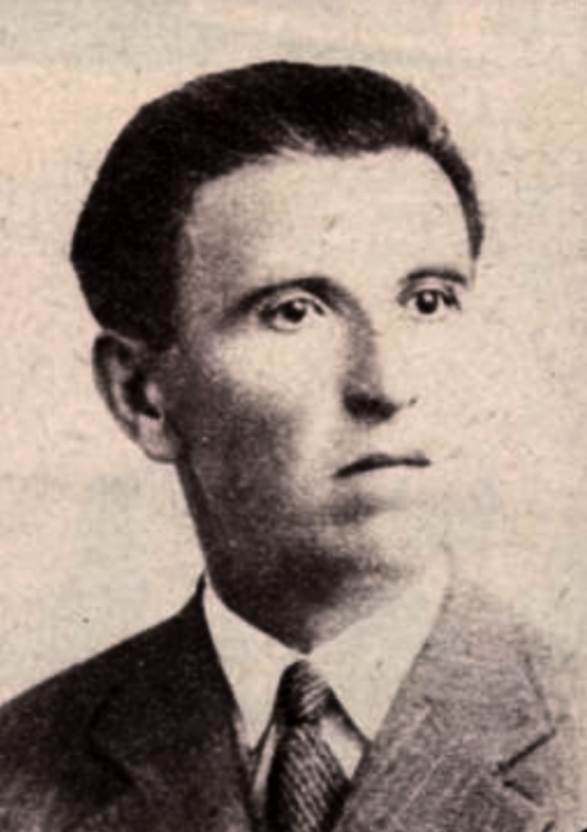
- Manfred Reifer as a Romanian deputy, 1931

Member of the Chamber of Deputies
- In office 1931–1932

Personal details
- Born: 3 January 1888 Banyliv-Pidhirnyi, Duchy of Bukovina, Austria-Hungary
- Died: March 21, 1952 (aged 64) Tel Aviv, Israel
- Citizenship: Austro-Hungarian; Romanian; Soviet; Israeli
- Party: Jewish Party
- Spouse: Janka (Judith) Korn
- Children: 2 (including Theodor Gideon)
- Occupation: Journalist; historian; author; politician
- Known for: Zionist leadership in Bukovina

Manfred Meir Reifer (Ukrainian: Манфред Райфер, Hebrew: מנפרד מאיר רייפר; 3 January 1888 – 21 March 1952) was a journalist, author, historian, and politician, as well as a prominent figure within the Zionist movement in Bukovina during the interwar period. A lawyer by education, he founded the German-language weekly newspaper Neue Jüdische Rundschau and represented the Jewish Party in the Romanian Parliament from 1931 to 1932. Having survived the Holocaust in Bukovina, Reifer immigrated to Mandatory Palestine in 1944, where he authored early historical accounts and memoirs concerning Romanian and Bukovinian Jewry.

== Early life and education ==
Reifer was born into a religious Jewish family in the village of Banyliv-Pidhirnyi (historically known in German as Moldauisch Banilla), located approximately 50 kilometers south of Czernowitz in the Duchy of Bukovina, then a crown land of the Austro-Hungarian Empire (now in Chernivtsi Oblast, Ukraine). His date of birth is recorded as 3 January 1888, though some biographical sources cite 1 April 1888. He spent his early childhood in a predominantly Yiddish and Ukrainian-speaking environment.

At the age of nine, Reifer moved to Czernowitz to pursue formal schooling. This educational trajectory was characteristic of Jewish families in the Habsburg monarchy following the constitutional emancipation of Jews in 1867, who viewed secular and German-language education as the principal conduit for upward social mobility. In Czernowitz, Reifer became immersed in German culture and literature, which permanently shaped his intellectual life. Although conversant in Ukrainian, Romanian, Yiddish and Hebrew, he chose to publish the vast majority of his historical and journalistic writings in German, the cultural lingua franca of educated Bukovinian Jewry. In the preface to his 1952 autobiography, Menschen und Ideen, he reflected on this formative influence: "It is autumn... I hasten to bring in the fruits of my life [...], the rich harvest, ripened on German soil."

During World War I, Reifer served in the Austro-Hungarian Army.

== Zionist activism and political career ==
Following the dissolution of Austria-Hungary and the incorporation of Bukovina into the Kingdom of Romania, Reifer remained in Czernowitz (now renamed as Cernăuți) throughout the interwar era, establishing himself as a historian, publicist, and communal leader. In 1921, he was elected alongside Zionist leader Mayer Ebner and Rabbi Jakob Hoffmann to represent the Jewish community of Bukovina at the Twelfth Zionist Congress in Carlsbad.

In 1926, Reifer established the German-language Zionist weekly Neue Jüdische Rundschau (New Jewish Review). The periodical's stated editorial mission was to contribute to the "thorough preparation" of a "new social order" in Palestine, while concurrently advocating for the "Zionization of the Diaspora" (Galuth). Reifer maintained the publication as politically independent and unsubsidized by any party faction. Despite its brief circulation period, the weekly exerted significant influence beyond regional borders, and its articles were frequently cited and reprinted by international press outlets, including the Jewish Telegraphic Agency (JTA) and the Berlin-based Zionist bulletin Zionistische Korrespondenz (Ziko).

In the 1931 Romanian general election, Reifer was elected to the Romanian Chamber of Deputies on the electoral list of the Jewish Party (Partidul Evreiesc), an organization formed to defend minority rights and promote independent Jewish national representation. He served as a member of parliament until 1932.

== World War II and the Holocaust ==
In 1940, northern Bukovina was annexed by the Soviet Union. He decided to remain in Soviet territory, after Romania has already experienced fascist and royal dictatorships that promoted antisemitic policies. When Soviet authorities initiated mass deportations of Zionist activists, community leaders, and political dissidents to Siberia in 1941, Reifer was spared due to a severe cardiovascular disease, with authorities granting an exemption based on his deteriorating health.

Following the launch of Operation Barbarossa in the summer of 1941, Romanian forces allied with Nazi Germany reoccupied the region. As the Romanian authorities initiated the mass deportation of Bukovinian and Bessarabian Jews to camps and ghettos in the Transnistria Governorate, Reifer was once again exempted from deportation owing to his chronic heart condition, allowing him to remain in Czernowitz. In 1942, he organized and directed a mutual-aid relief fund to assist Bukovinian Jews who had been exiled to Siberia during the Soviet occupation.

In 1943, Reifer left Czernowitz for Bucharest. In April 1944, he escaped wartime Europe, making Aliyah to Mandatory Palestine via an overland and maritime route through Turkey.

== Later life in Tel Aviv ==
Upon reaching Palestine, Reifer settled in Tel Aviv, where he devoted his remaining years to historical research and the documentation of the Holocaust in southeastern Europe. In 1946, he published Masa ha-Mavet ("The Death Journey") with the Am Oved publishing house, one of the earliest published Hebrew-language monographs detailing the persecution and extermination of Bukovinian Jewry. He also wrote biographies of contemporary Zionist leaders, poetry, and reflective memoirs.

Reifer died in Tel Aviv on 21 March 1952, at the age of 64.

== Personal life ==
Reifer married Janka (Judith) Korn. The couple had two children:

- Dita (born 1919).
- Theodor Gideon (born 1921), who volunteered for service in the British Army during World War II. He was killed in a vehicular accident near Beit Dagan in 1943 while on active military duty.

== Published works ==
=== In German ===
- Hundertjähriger Kampf um die Judenemanzipation in Rumänien (1825–1925) [The Hundred-Year Struggle for Jewish Emancipation in Romania (1825–1925)] (Breslau, 1925)
- Chaim Weizmann: der jüdische Staatsmann [Chaim Weizmann: The Jewish Statesman] (Czernowitz: Jüdischer Klub "Masada", 1933)
- Ausgewählte historische Schriften, Dokumenten-Sammlung [Selected Historical Writings: Collection of Documents] (Czernowitz: Societatea Istorico-Evreiască, 1938)
- Dr. Mayer Ebner: ein jüdisches Leben [Dr. Mayer Ebner: A Jewish Life] (Tel Aviv: Olympia, 1947)
- In den Vorhöfen des Heiligtums: Sonette [In the Forecourts of the Sanctuary: Sonnets] (Tel Aviv: Olympia, 1950)
- Menschen und Ideen: Erinnerungen [People and Ideas: Memoirs] (Tel Aviv: Olympia, 1952)

=== In Hebrew ===
- Masa ha-Mavet: Yehudei Bukovina ba-Shoah (Hebrew: מסע המוות: יהודי בוקובינה בשואה; "The Death Journey: The Jews of Bukovina in the Holocaust") (Tel Aviv: Am Oved, 1946)
- "Bukovina: History, Jews" (Hebrew: בוקובינה: היסטוריה, יהודים), in Joseph Klausner (ed.), Encyclopaedia Hebraica, Vol. 7 (Tel Aviv: Encyclopaedia Publishing Company, 1954), pp. 927–932 (published posthumously)
