= Jacob Itzhak Niemirower =

Romanian Reform rabbi

Rabbi Dr. Jacob Itzhak Niemirower

Chief Rabbi of Romania
- In office 1921–1939
- Title: Chief Rabbi of Romania

Personal life
- Born: March 1, 1872 Lemberg, Austro-Hungarian Empire (now Lviv, Ukraine)
- Died: November 18, 1939 (aged 67) Bucharest, Romania
- Education: University of Bern, Hildesheimer Rabbinical Seminary
- Occupation: Rabbi, theologian, philosopher, historian

Religious life
- Religion: Judaism
- Denomination: Reform

Rabbi Dr. Jacob Itzhak Niemirower (Romanian: Iacob Isaac Niemirower, born March 1, 1872, in Lemberg, then in the Austro-Hungarian Empire, now Lviv, Ukraine – died November 18, 1939, in Bucharest, Romania) was a Romanian Modern rabbi, theologist, philosopher and historian. Allied with reformist trends in Western and Eastern European Judaism, he served as the first Chief Rabbi of Romanian Jewry between 1921 and 1939, and was a member of the Romanian Senate from 1927 until his death.

An ardent supporter of Zionism and opponent of antisemitism, Dr. Niemirower defended the civil and human rights of Romanian Jews and led them on the path towards modernization of community life, in the spirit of what he called Cultural Judaism. This meant adhering to Jewish tradition while remaining open to the Romanian language and culture and to universal influences.

== Childhood and youth ==
Iacob Itzhak Niemirower was born on March 1, 1872, in the Galitzian town of Lemberg, or Lviv, then under Austrian administration in the Austro-Hungarian empire, now in Ukraine. His father, Nahum Niemirower, was a Jewish trader. The family moved later to Iaşi, the capital of Moldova, one of the main regions of the Romanian Kingdom. He received his first lessons of Torah from his paternal grandfather, and then from the melamed (Jewish teacher) Mendel Barasch. From them he acquired his fundamental knowledge of hassidic teachings. Later Jacob became the pupil of the famous rabbi and dayan from Lemberg, Rabbi Isaak Aharon Ettinger.

In 1890 Niemirower went to Berlin to study, and became acquainted with the Haskalah and Western philosophy. He also met the German philosopher and judaist Moritz Lazarus who became one of his best friends and exercised a great influence upon him. Niemirower studied at the Neo-Orthodox Theological Rabbinical Seminary of Berlin, and had as teacher one of its founders, rabbi Azriel Hildesheimer, ideologist of Modern Jewish Orthodoxy. As demanded by the curriculum, he also engaged in secular studies, of philosophy, history and Oriental studies in Berlin, and in 1895 received the title of doctor in philosophy with magna cum laude at the University of Bern, in Switzerland. His PhD thesis debated the relationships between free will, conscience, reward and punishment. At the end of his theological studies under the rabbi Ernst Abraham Biberfeld, he obtained the license of Orthodox rabbi. According to some sources, he also got a license of rabbi from the rabbi Michael (or maybe Jacob) Hamburger of Mecklenburg-Strelitz, whose philosophy aligned closer to Conservative Judaism.

== His activity in Iaşi: tradition, modernity and Zionism ==
On his coming back to Iaşi in 1896, he encountered hostility from the more traditional and Hassidic circles who regarded him as a kind of "Reform" rabbi; he found his first job as rabbi and preacher (darshan) at a reform synagogue, Beit Yaakov, named "Jacob Neuschotz Temple" after its donor.

Due to his growing prestige as a more open-minded modern rabbi also loyal to the Jewish tradition, Niemirower was elected in 1908 as chief rabbi of the community of the Moldavian centre. During those years he was very active in supporting the newly created Zionist movement: in 1897–1898 he revived the Zionist association "Oholey Shem" (God's Tents) – name so from a reference in the Bible - that had functioned in the past under the leadership of Dr. Karpel Lippe. He also took part in the editing of several Zionist gazettes e.g. "Răsăritul" (in Romanian – " The Sunrise" or "the East").

Niemirower attended the Zionist Congresses, in 1905 and 1908. At these meetings, he opposed the proposals of rabbi Yitzchak Yaacov Reines to choose the German language as national language of the Jewish people and insisted on the primacy of the Hebrew language. He was also one of the opponents of the Uganda plan which examined the possibility of creating a Jewish national territory in East Africa, as a definite or temporary alternative to the historical Palestine. In 1908, Niemirower coined the term "synthetic Zionism", through which, in his view, political Zionism – the line of Theodor Herzl - could be integrated with practical Zionism – that of resettlement in Palestine, in the tradition of the Hibat Zion movements in Eastern Europe.

Rabbi Niemirower was one of the most enthusiastic supporters of the modern Jewish education system which tried to integrate the study of Judaism and Hebrew with secular studies, including a country's vernacular.

In 1906, Niemirower was among the founders of the Cultural Society "Toynbee Hall" in Iaşi. It was an informal and popular Jewish university promoting Zionist thought, which had the support of several intellectuals and celebrities from Romania and abroad. Jewish personalities like Bernard Lazare, Nachum Sokolov and Sholem Aleichem (who gave lectures from his stories and novels in Yiddish) lectured at the institution over a period of ten years.

Niemirower was also very active in the B'nai B'rith organization and became its leader, first in Iaşi and later across Romania.

== Activity in Bucharest: the aspiration to a "New Yavne" ==
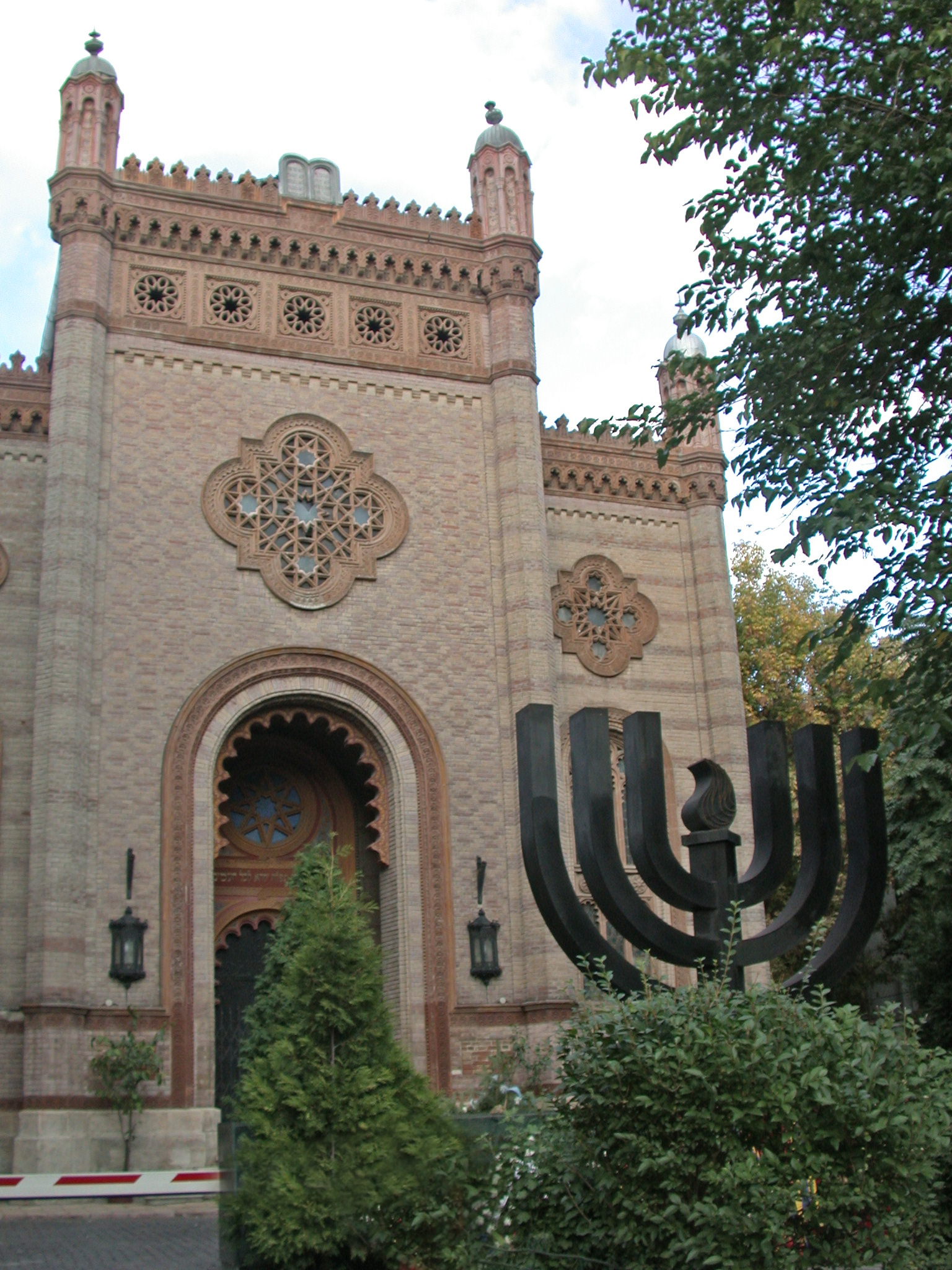
The modern Choral Temple of Bucharest, the center of the activity of Niemirower and of Romanian Jewish chief rabbis in Bucharest

In 1911, despite being Ashkenazi, Niemirower was invited by the old Sefardi Jewish community of Bucharest to be its rabbi. He also functioned as the rabbi of the Bucharest garrison and as examiner of new Hebrew language teachers, and was nominated by the Romanian Public Instruction Ministry as the Jewish representative in the Committee for Welfare Affairs presided over by Queen Maria of Romania. As speaker of the Jewish minority in Romania, Niemirower took part in the Paris Peace Conference, 1919 together with Dr Wilhelm Filderman, the leader and founder of the Union of the Native Jews, who became his close partner in the defense of Romanian Jews' rights.

Over the next few years, Niemirower bore witness to the recognition by Romanian authorities of the civil rights of all Jews in the recently reunited Romanian state. In 1921 in Bucharest, after the traditionalist orthodox rabbi Haim Schor failed in assuming the leadership, Niemirower was elected Grand Rabbi of the Old Kingdom Jewry (that is – of the Jews of Moldavia and Walachia), then as Chief Rabbi, a new office created by the community of Bucharest. In 1936 he was reconfirmed as Chief Rabbi of the Federation of Jewish Communities in all Romania. He thus succeeded in the centralization and recognition by the authorities of the organization of the "Mosaic cult" communities of the Romanian Jews. He united under his leadership all Jewish communities in Romania, from the traditionalist Orthodox to the modern Orthodox - called until the Communist era "Jews of Western Rite" - and the Neolog Jews of Transylvania.

Niemirower won the collaboration of the Gaon Rabbi Bezalel Shafran and other Jewish Orthodox rabbinical authorities to preclude such a schism as had occurred in Hungary and Transylvania between Orthodox and Modernists (who went on the path of the Neologs) and to preserve modernizing trends within the framework of the Orthodox tradition, somewhat like French Consistorial Judaism and British modern Orthodox Judaism under the leadership of Nathan Marcus Adler) did. He led the foundation in 1936 of the Central Council of Romanian Jewry which comprised personalities with opinions ranging from "civil assimilation" led by Dr. Wilhelm Filderman of the Union of the Native Jews to the Zionist thinkers led by A. L. Zissu.

Niemirower's main residence was the Choral Temple of Bucharest where the intellectual and religious modern Orthodox elite of the Romanian Jews created a kind of Jewish Academy - the Cultural Institute of the Choral Temple. In his activity in Bucharest, he was assisted by personalities as Dr. Filderman, the banker Ely Berkowitz, the rabbis Meyr Moritz Beck and Dr Meyer Abraham Halevy. The fundamental concept which guided his work was a "cultural Judaism" (constituted mainly by traditional, European, liberal and Zionist elements), based on the ideas of his friend, the philosopher Moritz Lazarus from Germany, with local adaptations, combined with influences from Ahad Ha'am, the father of "cultural Zionism" and the historian Simon Dubnov, ideologue of the Jewish "spiritual nation". The ancient inspiration for his efforts was, in his eyes, Yohanan Ben Zakai, the founder of the Academy in Yavne, after the destruction of the Second Temple (70 a.Ch). Niemirower dreamt about the foundation of a new Yavneist Academy in the Holy Land, which could attract spiritual personalities of world Jewry.

== His last years ==
Jacob Itzhak Niemirower and Yehuda Leib Tsirelson at the 1922 Coronation of King Ferdinand and Queen Maria of Romania

Given the rise of Nazi-like antisemitism in his country and in Europe, Niemirower visited Palestine in 1938 to explore the possibility of mass emigration of Romania's Jews. The plan did not fructify due to hostile circumstances. The British government blocked all such initiatives at the time, and in September 1939, the Second World War broke out.

On November 18, 1939 Niemirower died in Bucharest. He was buried in the Old Jewish Orthodox cemetery of Bucharest. The young rabbi Dr Alexandru Șafran, already a prestigious scholar and the son of rabbi Bezalel Şafran from Bacău, succeeded him as chief rabbi of Romania (Rav Kolel). Niemirower's personality and work remained a source of inspiration for both Şafran, and his successor Rabbi Moses Rosen.

== Bibliography ==
Dr. Niemirower published about 650 articles in journals and reviews in German, Romanian, French, Hebrew and Yiddish languages. A selection of his works -

- Zichron Nachum – sermons and conferences (1903), H. Goldner publishing house, Iaşi
- Hassidism and Zadikism (in German – Chassidismus und Zaddikismus) (1913), Baer Publ. house, Bucharest.
- Frei und treu, Jabnehist.Essays (1914)
- Contributions à la philosophie historique juive (in French, 1914)
- Spinozaverehrung eines Nichtspinozisten In: Spinoza-Festschrift : Zum 300. Geburtstage Benedict Spinozas (1632–1932) / Herausgegeben von Siegfried Hessing. – Heidelberg : Winter, 1933: 164–166. (Homage to Spinoza from the side of Non-Spinozist – article in a publication marking the 300th birth anniversary of the philosopher, 1933)
- Complete writings – Scrieri complete – in Romanian, in 4 volumes (1918–1932)
- Iudaismul (Judaism) – Hasefer, Bucharest (2005)

== Sources ==
- Ion Mitican - Evreii din Tîrgul Cucului (Ed. Tehnopress, Iaşi, 2005)
- Neue Deutsche Biographie, Band 19, Nauwach - Pagel, S.238 Duncker und Humblot, Berlin, 1999, (Noua Biografie Germană, vol. 19. p. 238 publ. de Comitetul istoric al Academiei de Ştiinţe a Bavariei, Berlin, 1999)
- G. Wigoder – Evreii în lume, Dicţionar biografic, redacţia română – Viviane Prager- Editura Hasefer, București, 2001 ( Romanian edition of the Dictionary of Jewish Biography, ed.Vivane Prager, Hasefer Publ.House, Bucharest.2001)
