= Jewish Party (Romania) =

Jewish Party Partidul Evreiesc din România (Partidul Național Evreiesc) המפלגה היהודית הרומנית אידישע פארטיי Országos Zsidó Párt Jüdische Reichspartei
- President: Tivadar Fischer (1931–1938); A. L. Zissu (1944–1946); Collective leadership (1946); Mișu Benvenisti (1946–1947)
- Founded: May 4, 1931; August 30/September 18, 1944 (reestablishment)
- Dissolved: March 30, 1938 (first); December 4, 1947 (second)
- Succeeded by: Social Zionist Council (1940)
- Headquarters: Bucharest; 1934: Strada Bradului 31, Văcărești; 1944: Strada Oțetari 5, Armenian Quarter; 1946: Strada Popa Soare 30, Mahalaua Sfântul Ștefan
- Newspaper: Tribuna Evreiască; Renașterea Noastră; Új Kelet; Neue Zeit–Új Kor
- Youth wing: Tineretul Partidului Evreiesc (TPE)
- Regional wing: Transylvanian Jewish National League (EZNSz/UNET)
- Ideology: Jewish community interests Zionism; Communitarianism; Integral nationalism Liberal conservatism (Jewish); Antifascism; Anticommunism; Factions: Religious Zionism; Revisionist Zionism; Jewish left (after 1944)
- Political position: Right-wing to far-right (1931–1938, 1944–1946); Left-wing (1946–1947)
- National affiliation: Central Council of Romanian Jews (1936, 1938); General Jewish Council (1944); Jewish Representation (1946)
- International affiliation: World Zionist Organization (1930s); World Jewish Congress (1937–1938, 1944–1947)

The Jewish Party, in full the Jewish Party of Romania (Romanian: Partidul Evreiesc din România, PER; Hebrew: המפלגה היהודית הרומנית; Yiddish: אידישע פארטיי, Idishe partey) or the Jewish National Party (Partidul Național Evreiesc or Evreesc, PNE; Hungarian: Országos Zsidó Párt), was a right-wing political party in Romania, representing Jewish community interests. It originally followed an undercurrent of Zionism, promoting communitarianism as a prerequisite of resettlement in Palestine, and later progressed toward Religious Zionism and Revisionism. Founded by Tivadar Fischer, József Fischer, and Adolphe Stern, it had particularly strong sections in Transylvania and Bessarabia. In the Old Kingdom, where it registered least support, it was mainly represented by A. L. Zissu, Mișu Benvenisti, and Renașterea Noastră newspaper.

The PER was strongly opposed to the liberal and assimilationist program of Wilhelm Filderman and his Union of Romanian Jews (UER). Its core belief in Jewishness as a distinct political body was controversial, opposed by Filderman's disciples, by members of Orthodox and Sephardi groups, as well as by Romanians who wanted Jews to be socially desegregated; likewise, the PER's appreciation for Religious Zionism, including its recruitment of clerics such as Yehuda Leib Tsirelson, was resented by secular Jews. The Fischers managed to undermine the UER's spread into Transylvania and other regions, presenting its own candidates in elections for Parliament for most of the 1930s, and emerging as a vocal opponent of antisemitism. Repeatedly stating its respect for the central tenets of Romanian nationalism, the PER was generally committed to collaboration with the non-Jewish groups, including the National Peasantists and the National Liberals, but also the Magyar Party.

Effectively pushed out of national politics due to unfavorable circumstances which existed during the elections of 1933, the PER formed a Central Council of Romanian Jews together with the UER. The Fischers' alliances compromised the party's reputation during the 1937 legislative elections, when it had a non-aggression pact with the National Peasantists; by proxy, this deal also involved the antisemitic Iron Guard. During the final months of its existence, it fought against the antisemitic laws introduced by Prime Minister Octavian Goga, including by organizing an economic boycott. The PER was ultimately banned, together with all other political groups, in early 1938; the National Renaissance Front, formed later that year, explicitly barred entry to the Jews. The PER's support base was scattered by territorial changes which occurred during World War II, and it was decimated during the Holocaust. Some of its leaders, in particular Zissu, were involved with a Zionist network of resistance, and helped over 10,000 Jews illegally emigrate into Palestine.

The PER reemerged days after the anti-Nazi coup of 1944, with Zissu as its chairman. It was more successful in its competition with the similarly reestablished UER, managing to draw away supporters of the latter. Its brand of nationalism clashed with the Romanian Communist Party and its satellite Jewish Democratic Committee, as well as with Ihud-type Labor Zionism. After failing to obtain government recognition for its communitarian platform, the party was split between two camps. One, which was anti-communist, supported Zissu's platform of mass emigration into Palestine, and stood by the Revisionists during their conflict with Britain. The other camp, led by Benvenisti, was more open to cooperation with the communists, and it was in control of the PER by October 1946. Under Benvenisti, the PER adhered to a communist-controlled "Jewish Representation", presenting officially vetted candidates during the elections of November 1946. Within two years, the communist regime dissolved all of the Zionist organizations, imprisoning Zissu and Benvenisti. The PER's youth wing was absorbed by the National Federation of Democratic Youth, with which it merged into the Union of Working Youth in 1949.

== History ==
=== Origins ===
The PER came into being as a result of dissensions within the Jewish community. These followed the Jewish emancipation decrees of the early 1920s, and were aggravated by cultural and political differences between the regions of Greater Romania. Filderman's Union of Native Jews (as the UER was known before 1923) believed that a separate Jewish party was unnecessary, as it would isolate the Jews politically after they had struggled for decades to win Romanian citizenship. The Union stated that specific demands could be obtained more easily by participating in Romanian parties and collaborating with the Romanian government. As Filderman argued, the "specific interests" of the Jews "are not in disagreement with the general interests of the Romanian state". According to historian Henry Eaton, its stance was "politically cooperative" toward Romanian parties, seeking to "deflect the charge that Jews in Romania represented a separate and alien nation". More generally, the UER stood for a platform of Jewish assimilation: it was "rather supportive of integration", or even "moderate Romanianization". However, the UER was not fundamentally adverse to Zionism, with Filderman himself noting: "a Romanian Jew cannot oppose the creation of a Jewish national state".

The UER's assimilationist viewpoint was not shared by a group led by Tivadar (Theodor) Fischer, József Fischer, and Adolphe Stern. Stern, who represented the "Old Kingdom" regions, had been the original leader of the Union of Native Jews, serving from 1909 to 1923, in which capacity he supported emancipation and criticized the growth of violent antisemitism as embodied by the National-Christian Defense League (LANC). His original outlook was "moderate assimilationism" in ideological succession to Joseph Brociner. Stern embraced Zionism in 1919, collecting funds for the Third Aliyah and engaging in the "struggle to regroup and transform the Jewish social and economic structure." He had been elected to the Assembly of Deputies in 1922, as an ally of the non-Jewish Peasants' Party, caucusing with the Bukovina Zionist group headed by Mayer Ebner. The UER itself had opted for an alliance with the National Liberal Party (PNL), perceived by its Jewish sympathizers as the party of "order and peace".

Tivadar Fischer and József Fischer were Hungarian Jews from Transylvania. According to one account, they were sons of an Alba Iulia rabbi, stranded in Romania upon the end of World War I. Historian Attila Gidó writes that they were unrelated by blood, but united by their common defense of Orthodox Judaism; József Fischer had been a critic of Zionism, before being drawn into it by other Transylvanian activists, to become "one of Transylvanian Zionism's most important personalities". As noted by political scientist Randolph L. Braham, "political culture" in the Fischers' constituency "was forged by their earlier experiences in the Hungarian Kingdom." As founders of the Transylvanian Jewish National League (EZNSz/UNET) and the single-issue Transylvanian People's Party, they had expressed their opposition to the UER as early as 1923, calling for its transformation into a "general union" of loosely affiliated bodies. Against the position taken by pro-UER Transylvanians such as Miksa Klein, they advised in favor of communitarianism, rejecting assimilation into the Romanian mainstream.

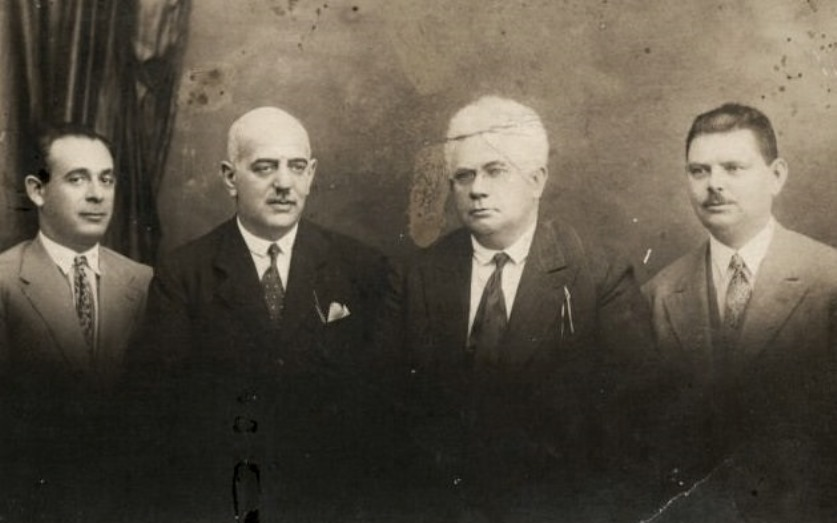
The Jewish Parliamentary Club in 1928. From the left: Michel Landau, Tivadar Fischer, Mayer Ebner, József Fischer

On February 26, 1928, the EZNSz/UNET, which doubled as a local branch of the World Zionist Organization, held a special meeting to address antisemitic riots which had occurred in Cluj and Oradea. It publicized its intention of forming the "Jewish political party", announcing that the UER had been persuaded into fusing with the latter. The effort had failed to materialize before parliamentary elections in December 1928. The EZNSz/UNET formed a cartel with the National Peasants' Party (PNȚ), which won both Fischers seats in the Assembly. They coalesced into a "parliamentary club" with Ebner and the Bessarabian Zionist Michel Landau, calling themselves segments of a "country-wide Jewish party". Lawyer Mișu Benvenisti, previously affiliated with the Hatalmid organization in Bucharest, was assigned as general secretary of their faction.

Their calls for the establishment of a registered party were not welcomed by the governing Democratic Nationalists; Jewish deputies accused the authorities of "inertia" and unwillingness to confront LANC antisemitism, and registered with the opposition. Constantin Argetoianu, the Minister of the Interior, opined: "Beyond equality as citizens, the Israelites cannot state any demand. Those of an ethnic nature, as taken up by a national Jewish party, would trap the Israelites in a political ghetto and would render difficult the matter of their integration." Columnist Constantin Bacalbașa also reacted against plans to create a "party of the Zionist Jews", noting: "Romania's parliament is a national parliament, it may only include parties that represent currents born within the country itself. But as long as the basis and rationale of the Zionist party is the Palestinian agenda, what logical purpose is there for it to be represented in a Romanian chamber? [...] I venture to believe that many Jews, who are now Romanian citizens, hold the same opinion as me."

=== Original PER ===
==== Creation ====
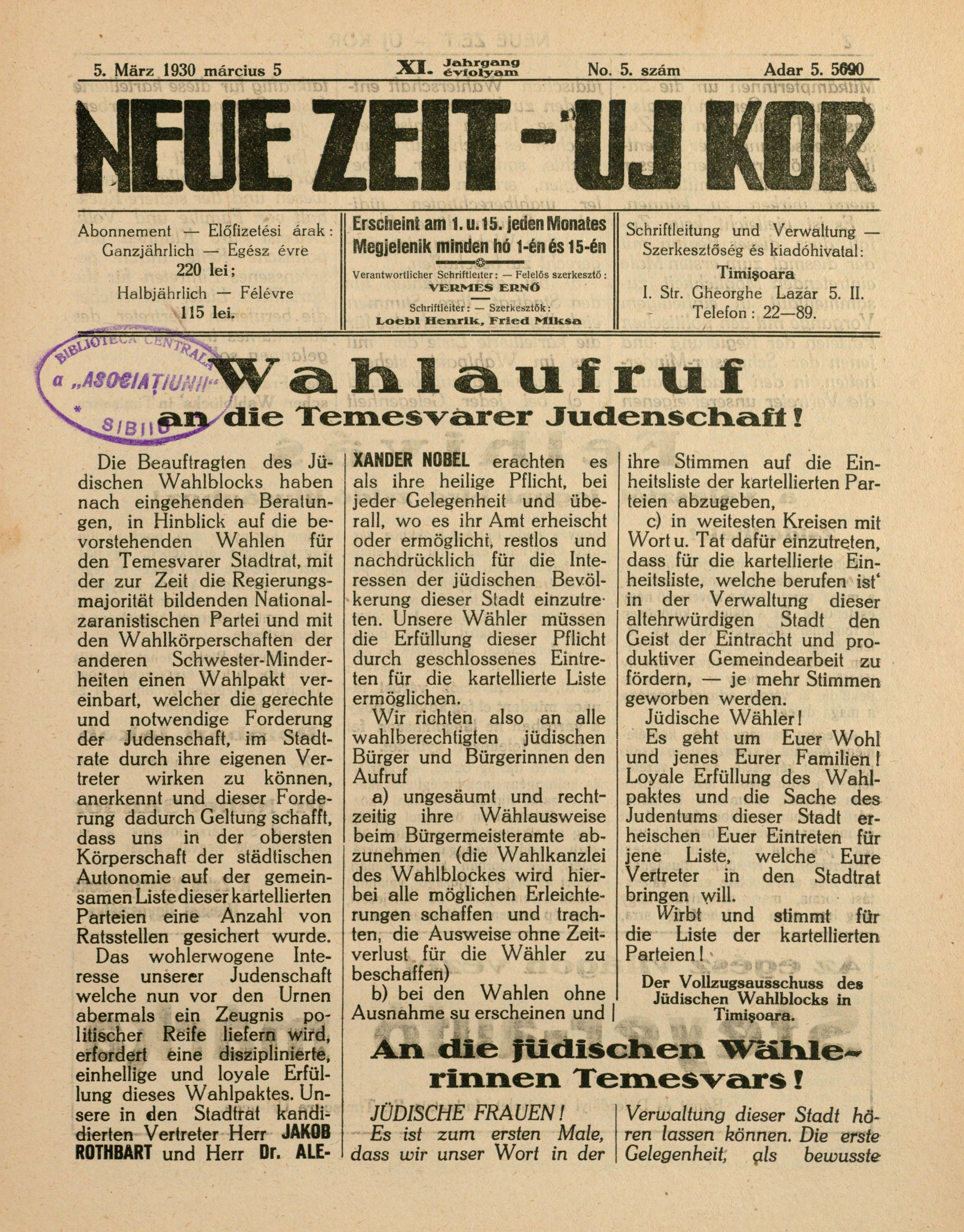
Neue Zeit–Új Kor of March 5, 1930, announcing the formation of a Jewish electoral bloc to elect Alexandru Nobel for the municipal council in Timișoara

The Jewish political movement remained factionalized, including when it came to its Zionist sub-current. At the Sixteenth Zionist Congress of July 1929, seven of fifteen Romanian delegates were "centrists", and announced their intention of forming a separate party, under Adolf Bernhard; "radical" Zionists, which stood in opposition to this initiative, counted on two delegates—Benvenisti and I. Schechter (both of them from the "Old Kingdom"). In the Jewish center of Iași, Ilie Mendelsohn had controversially formed his own "Jewish Party" and "Israelite Community", which functioned as satellites of the PNȚ. A Bucharest-based Jewish National Party was ultimately established in March 1930. Active members included Benvenisti, Ozias Copel, Lupu Haimsohn, Iosif Ioil, Lazăr Lăzărescu, and Sami Stern; Adolphe Stern was a recipient of their pledges. It presented its own list for Sector II (Black) during the local elections of August, using the menorah as a logo. The list also included Pincu Blumenfeld, Aron Goldstein, Leon Mizrachi, Moți (or Motti) Moscovici, and Leon B. Wexler.

The PER was formally the fusion of the Bucharest radicals' fusion with another short-lived Jewish National Party, formed in Transylvania around the Fischers. The latter traced its existence to May 1930, when early talks with the UER for the formation of a national communitarian party had broken down, resulting in a separate organization for Transylvania. The resulting unified Jewish Party was established on May 4, 1931 in Bucharest. It took over the menorah as a national symbol, but also used "two small convex arcs joined together by a horizontal line", described in party propaganda as "the symbol of Jewish solidarity connected by a straight line". It published as its central organ Tribuna Evreiască of Bucharest, and its regional newspapers were the EZNSz/UNET's Új Kelet of Cluj and Neue Zeit–Új Kor of Timișoara. Its first-ever conference elected Tivadar Fischer as party president. He was seconded by an eight-member committee, while Adolphe Stern was honorary president, and József Fischer led the Transylvanian wing.

As argued by PER recruit Benvenisti, the group was reliant on its regional networks of "trusted men", since both the PNL and the PNȚ resented it for drawing away some of their votes. The PER would not openly campaign in the provinces, but its local bosses managed to submit electoral lists, which Jews could then vote for on the basis of ethnic affiliation. Benvenisti notes that such figures included Bernard Rohrlich of Botoșani and Carol Reiter of Timișoara. In Chișinău, Landau was putting out and "writing almost entirely by himself" two Yiddish newspapers, Der Yid and Unser Zeit. Throughout the 1930s, lawyer Isaia Tumarkin was president of the PER's section in the Bessarabian city of Bălți. In Bukovina, where the PER was foremost known as the Jüdische Reichspartei, its chapter came to include, alongside Ebner, the unorthodox Zionist Max Diamant, formerly of the Jewish National People's Party, and Karl Klüger, Saul Klüger, Josef Mann, Mizrachi, Benedikt Kaswan, Manfred Reiffer, and Leon Schmelzer. Ernő (Ernest) Marton, Mișu Weissman, and Landau were other prominent members of the PER. Lawyer Eugen Kertész headed the PER chapter in Cluj, later joined by the UER defector Miksa Klein.

Many party recruits continued to espouse a distinctly radical Zionism. In 1929, Ebner criticized Moses Mendelssohn and his assimilationist ideology upon Mendelssohn's centennial, arguing that: "the ideas of assimilation lead straight to de-Judaisation, alienation, indifference towards all things Jewish, and finally to dissolution." Such commentary was also found in Marton's own essays, which were addressed to the Hungarian Jews of Transylvania: "The Jews", Marton noted, "would be able to live among the peoples only as a people." At that stage, the party was joined by the Zionist writer-industrialist A. L. Zissu, who brought in his own Zionist cell, Renașterea Noastră. In 1930, the latter group had taken control of the Zionist Federation in Bucharest. Zissu, a "bourgeois conservative", also advocated "integral" Zionism, communitarianism and self-segregation within the "poly-ethnic state", whereas Filderman's stances were "coherently liberal".

Strongly inclined to a prophetic form of Religious Zionism, Zissu defined himself as "the political opponent" of the UER. As he explained in a 1931 interview, he still regarded the PER as politically and socially compatible with the "Romanian bourgeoisie", regardless of its ethnic background, seeing this symbiosis as a necessary curb on full segregation. Zissu also claimed that the PER had served the Romanian state in unifying Jews from Transylvania and Bessarabia, who were not Romanian-speaking, around the Bucharest nucleus, which endured as "so very close to Romanian language and culture." The latter goal was received with annoyance by Magyarized Jews who identified with the Hungarian minority. On their behalf, writer Géza Földes expressed the belief that Transylvanian Jews would remain Hungarian, just as Old-Kingdom Jews would continue to be Romanian, forcing the Zionists "to recruit members of the Jewish party from among Hebrew-speaking Jews."

Leaders of regional Jewish groups, 1929–1931
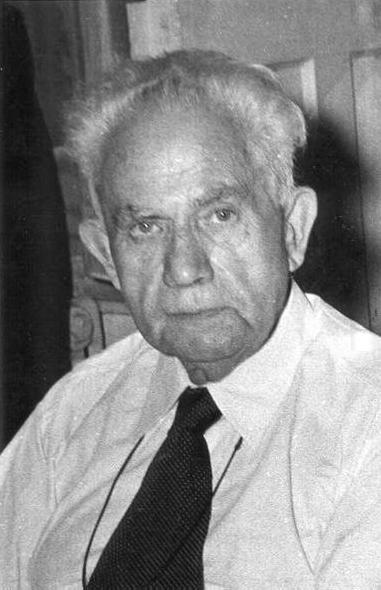
Mayer Ebner, c. 1950

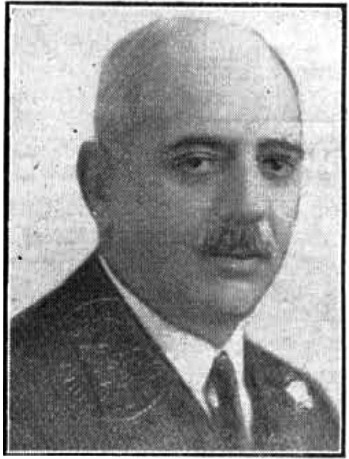
Tivadar Fischer in 1935

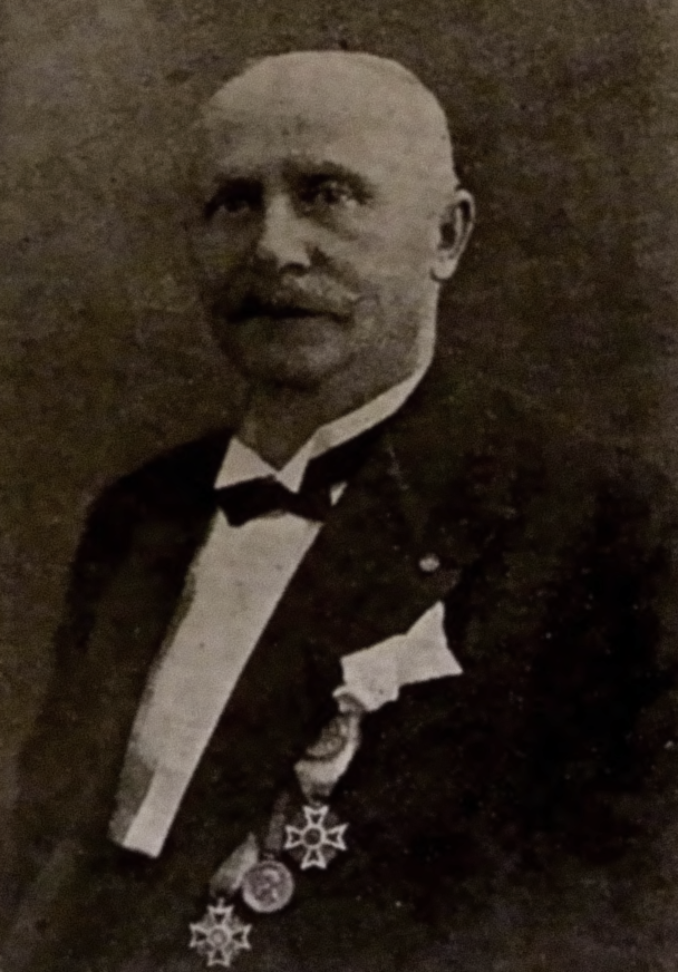
Ilie Mendelsohn, c. 1939

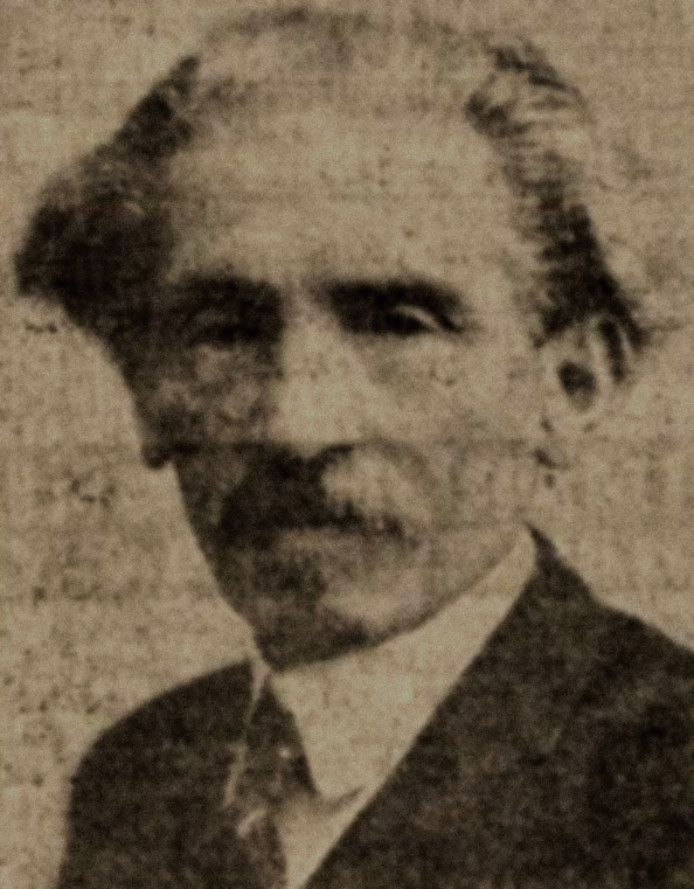
Adolphe Stern, c. 1920

==== Early growth and stagnation ====
The PER took part in the June 1931 election. Its list for Bucharest-centered Ilfov County, announced on May 9, was headlined by Adolphe Stern and Tivadar Fischer. The other positions were held, in descending order of eligibility, by Radu Bauberger, Mihail Stern, Weissman, Iosef M. Gotlieb, Ernest Frenkel, Blumenfeld, Mizrachi, Mayer Segall, Robert Weinberg-Verea, Leiba Rosenberg, Osias Avram, Benedict Littman, Alfons Feldman, Lăzărescu, Moriț Abramovici, and Benvenisti. The UER, accused by the PER of electoral fraud, preferred to join Argetoianu's "National Union" alliance. Zissu made one of his few returns to Romania, intervening to sabotage the alliance, and urging Jews to focus on voting for the PER. In the end, the PER obtained some 60,000 votes, 2.19 or 2.38% of the total—depending on the number of deputies considered as part of the PER. A review of the results, carried in Dimineața of June 8, concluded that 64,000 Jews had voted for the PER, of a total 180,000 Jews who voted, indicating that "the immense majority of Jewish voters opposes such a party and [the notion of having] separate Jewish lists."

The Stern–Fischer list only received 24 votes, all of them in the rural parts of Ilfov; by comparison, the group's best performance, in the northern Bessarabian County of Soroca, had gathered 3,680 votes. Overall, however, the PER had received a significant share of the votes in localities that had virtually no Jewish inhabitants, including Brâncoveni, Chirnogi, Focșani, Movilița, and Sascut—indicating that "matters of local convenience" had dictated the vote. Landau was arrested while a candidate in Hotin County, allegedly because he had exposed Argetoianu's fraud and had refused to settle the matter with bribes. According to Landau, there were normally 12,000 Jewish voters in that corner of Bessarabia, and all of them had pledged for the PER. In the neighboring Bălți County, the PER list was not approved in time for the election, leading Tivadar Fischer to ask for an invalidation. The PER formally won four seats in the Assembly of Deputies, but later received another affiliation, raising it two five seats. Ebner took the final position in Cernăuți and Diamant did similarly Storojineț, with József Fischer elected in Maramureș County, and Tivadar at Soroca. Rieffer won the race in Câmpulung County after government agreed to a recount. In accordance with a previous agreement that no affiliate region would go unrepresented, Tivadar Fischer was replaced by Landau, and Ebner ceded his seat to Sami Singer.

Adolphe Stern died on October 20, 1931, with both the PER and the UER sending their representatives at his funeral. Zissu succeeded him as the PER's honorary president "about 1931", but was living abroad and, by his own account, never sought to control the group. Shortly after, parliamentary elections were scheduled for July 1932. In February, Landau, alongside Tivadar and József Fischer, were unexpectedly barred by the government authorities from speaking at an electoral meeting in Sighet; their attempt to address the Maramureș Jews from inside Talmud Tora Synagogue was also broken up by the Romanian Police. Nationally, the Jewish political body remained factionalized when it came to electing its leadership: in June 1932, the Jewish Community of Galați reelected as its president Jean Steuerman, of the local Șulem List, against PER and UER candidates. On June 30, the city welcomed Sami Singer, in preparation for the parliamentary race. At the time, Singer informed voters that an alliance with the UER would bring a "destruction of that ten-year combat we have been waging to awaken our [Jewish] national sentiment." The UER meanwhile had failed to renew its PNL alliance, and was approached by the Zionist Lazar Margulies to negotiate a merger with the PER. The talks were inconclusive. Subsequently, the UER, absorbing into its ranks dissident Zionists from the PER's Bukovina chapter, caucused with the nationwide Traders' Council.

Conflicts turned violent in Iași, where, on July 6, 1932 a PER meeting hosted by Singer and Lazăr Marcusohn was broken up by assimilated Jews, the two sides "pummeling each other for a quarter of an hour." As reported by Opinia newspaper, the intruders were angered by the announced participation of rabbis such as Yehuda Leib Tsirelson "when their place is in the synagogue". A similar incident took place on July 11 in the Chenciu Street Synagogue of Bârlad. On July 15, Filderman spoke before 3,000 of his followers in Galați, arguing that: "all accomplishments in individual, religious, and cultural emancipation are the work of the UER. The Jewish Party has accomplished absolutely nothing and has calumny as its only weapon." The PER was also shunned by Orthodox Jews in Transylvania. On July 14, the Chief Rabbi of Turda, Albert Wessel, informed PER delegates to the Orthodox Jewish congress in Băile Felix that: "The Jewry will not be able to defend its social, cultural and economic interests within a single party, even if it were the Jewish Party." By then, the PER section in Sătmar County had been deserted by "many leading Jews", who disliked the results of party primaries.

Concentration of the Jewish population per county in Greater Romania. Particularly strong and non-assimilated communities existed in Maramureș, Bukovina, and northern Bessarabia, where the PER drew most of its votes

These elections, organized and won by the PNȚ government of Alexandru Vaida-Voevod, were noted as the least fraudulent of their time. The PER took 2.26% and 5 seats: Fischer and Landau were returned; Marton, Weissman, and Ebner won the other three seats. From then on, the PER was the sole Jewish party in the Assembly, the UER having failed to win sufficient votes. In Iași County, the PER had opted not to present any list for the national Senate, advising its followers to vote for PNȚ candidates. The PER's electoral basin was in Romania's "new regions", with only a slim presence in the Old Kingdom: some 40% of its total voters were from Transylvania, where over 70% of the emancipated Jewish population voted PER. Its main competitor was the Magyar Party, which took away votes from Hungarian-assimilated Jews; Jews from the less Magyarized zones, in particular the historical Maramureș, were predominantly PER voters. In the east, Landau and Tumarkin's Bessarabian constituency, comprising some of the poorest and least integrated sections of Romanian Jews, provided the PER with its other main electoral resource. Largely agricultural, Bessarabian Jews were also committed to Labor Zionism, and as such had a "very vivid political struggle" with the other Zionists. This ideology became dominant within the HeHalutz—a youth movement that offered Jews training for life on farms in Mandatory Palestine.

The spread of socialism and communism in Bessarabia became a contentious issue, opposing the Jewish left to the conservative establishment of Greater Romania. The PER, and especially deputy Landau, sought to mediate, noting that, by May 1932, the authorities were persecuting and even torturing Bessarabian Jews, including those on the political right, "based on simple hunches". In October 1932, Weissman and Sami Stern successfully petitioned Armand Călinescu, PNȚ Minister of the Interior, into ordering a relaxation of measures against the HeHalutz—after young Zionists had been harassed by agents of the Siguranța. The PER delegation argued that Zionism was successfully countering "youthful radicalization"; Călinescu agreed, expressing "his full sympathy for Zionism, with which he is familiarized, and whose deeds he appreciates". By mid 1933, Landau and his Unser Zeit created a national controversy by taking up the cause of Bessarabian communists who had been arrested for agitation in favor of the Soviet Union (which had stated a claim to Bessarabia and Bukovina as Soviet irredenta). Elefterie Negel of Universul paper noted the "audacity of this agitator [Landau]" in claiming that prisoners had been tortured, without material evidence to back his allegation.

==== Revisionist and antifascist turn ====
The parliamentary period refined the PER's program, adopted at a general congress in November 1933, into a doctrine. It sought to raise awareness among Romanian Jews that they belonged to a larger Jewish people, while at the same time re-affirming their devotion to the country in which they lived. The party fought for legal, moral and material rights, with a view toward the spiritual development of the Jewish minority (including state support for primary and professional schools, as well as for Jewish worship). Additionally, the PER program noted the need to promote collaboration with the political groups representing Romania's other nationalities. Over these years, the PER became more supportive of Revisionist Zionism, its radicalism on this topic being spurred on by the steady growth of antisemitic intolerance in Romania, represented by groups such as the LANC and the Iron Guard. Weissman had seconded the Revisionist ideologue Ze'ev Jabotinsky during the elections for the Seventeenth Zionist Congress in June 1931, against Singer, who ran on a Renașterea Noastră list. Through the EZNSz/UNET, which continued to exist as a cultural extension, the PER gathered funds for the colonization of destitute Maramureș Jews into Palestine, founding there the settlement Tzur Shalom. It also initiated sociological research into the impoverished communities, sponsoring a survey team headed by István Barzilay, and organized a chapter for traders and artisans.

After the Nazi regime was established in Germany, the PER stood in solidarity with the parties that defended liberal democracy. It organized meetings to condemn the antisemitic actions in Germany and the manifestations of extreme-right sentiment then gaining currency in Romanian political life. In late April 1933, at a time when Romanian territorial integrity was seemingly threatened by Hungarian irredentism, Weissman, delegated by the party leadership as a whole, attended the Romanian patriotic rally at Arenele Romane of Bucharest, and gave a speech; in May, the PER chapter in Bihor, under Ernő Klein, protested alongside groups such as the Romanian National Home, declaring its loyalism. The message was also carried on behalf of the PER by A. Rizel, during a loyalist rally in Sulița. In August 1933, Weissman spoke in parliament about how the PER was reconciling "objective patriotism" with a "solidarity of the Jews". His speech was interrupted by the LANC's A. C. Cuza, but also by the PNȚ's Jewish parliamentarian, Aureliu Weiss—the latter objected to Weissman's cultural separatism.

The PER's antifascism also created a rift with the major parties of the establishment: the PNL called it a party of "provocateurs", whose activity actually "stokes the right-wing extremist reaction". In the Assembly, LANC deputy Nichifor Robu was suspended in 1932 for having hit Landau with a chair. PER deputies issued a protest letter of protest against another LANC deputy, Corneliu Șumuleanu, whom they accused of having tolerated antisemitic discrimination in his professional life. Șumuleanu sued them for defamation. Among the former PER deputies, Reiffer split with his party and his community over such issues: in September 1933, he opined that "the German movement for the destruction of Jews is nothing if not the natural reaction of Germans against the current attitude of Jews in Germany." As he put it: "We Jews toyed with the leading virtues of the German people and made fun of what that nation holds as sacred."

Ahead of Assembly elections in December 1933, the PER considered an alliance with Prime Minister Ion G. Duca and his PNL. The deal was allegedly sabotaged by a Jewish industrialist, Max Auschnitt, who believed that Jews should not pursue political office. The PER ultimately presented no candidates in Ilfov, and similarly excluded 31 (from a total of 71) provincial constituencies: Argeș, Bacău, Buzău, Cahul, Caliacra, Cetatea Albă, Ciuc, Constanța, Dâmbovița, Dolj, Durostor, Făgăraș, Gorj, Hunedoara, Ialomița, Mehedinți, Muscel, Olt, Putna, Râmnicu Sărat, Roman, Romanați, Tecuci, Teleorman, Tighina, Trei Scaune, Tulcea, Tutova, Vâlcea, Vaslui, and Vlașca. Marton ran at Odorhei, with Kertész and Iacob Rimoczi as the leading candidates in Cluj County; Benvenisti ran at Bălți, second on his list after Rahmil Ioffe, while József Fischer and Lazar Leitner headlined the list in Bihor. In both Brăila and Covurlui, the party presented Isidor Bauberger, seconded by Miksa Klein, while Meier Teich and Ebner were the only two names up for election in Câmpulung—Ebner also ran in Cernăuți, alongside Kaswan and Sami Singer, in Storojineț, alongside Alexandru Nobel, and in Suceava, with Benvenisti and Teich. The latter also had the eligible position in Hotin, before Landau and Gherș Braunștein. In tandem, Landau was the second candidate in Lăpușna, between Rabbi Tsirelson and Haim Cogan; he was the first option in both Orhei and Soroca (with Benvenisti and Sami Singer in second place, respectively). The latter was additionally the third PER candidate in Rădăuți County, after Tivadar Fischer and Nobel. Western Moldavian constituencies had Rohrlich and Weissman on the Botoșani and Dorohoi lists (on the latter, they seconded Braunștein), with Mizrachi and Segall put up as the leading candidates in Fălciu and Neamț, respectively. In Iași County, I. Bauberger, Philippe Rosenstein, and David Grinberg occupied the first three positions. In Alba County, Rudolf Kastner joined a list of candidates headlined by Mauritiu Deutsch, while also running with Tivadar Fischer and Abraham Fried in Maramureș.

The Fischers won explicit backing from the Union of Revisionist Zionists in Romania, which, despite noting some disagreements, decided not to submit its own list for the election. On December 9, the PER had informed the UER that it was not interested in an alliance; also then, it rejected a competing offer of forming a cartel with the Georgist Liberal Party. The PER also defied an agreement between other Jewish organizations, over not presenting its own candidates. Its dissidence was met with anger in other community circles, and a scuffle erupted between PER supporters and their assimilationist candidates in Galați. At the time, the UER called on Jewish voters to support those parties that defended "constitutional order through the cooperation in harmony of all citizens [...], without barriers of race or creed". A powerful setback followed: winning 1.29% of the vote, the PER lost all its seats in parliament. Its best result was at Cernăuți, where it came in fifth, with 3,516 votes, behind the PNȚ (which had 4,185). This fall was attributed by the party itself to the PNL's machinations. This claim was advanced by Adevărul newspaper, which noted as implausible that the PER of Maramureș had taken "only 533 votes out of 43,000 voters listed". Landau allegedly centralized reports showing that "terror is everywhere". One of these claimed that the party had been chased out of Cahul by PNL agents, who had also "severely beaten up" PER activist Tully Rosenthal.

There are also clues that the poor show may in fact have been a perverse effect of antisemitism: many Jews followed the UER stance and voted for non-Jewish democratic parties, in hopes of keeping the far-right out of parliament. The Jews were openly encouraged to do so by Adevărul and Dimineața, which, as R. Bauberger complained, disliked Zionism despite being "fed by Jewish money." The two newspapers hosted an appeal calling on the Jews to disregard the PER; the latter's representatives noted that the text was signed by "baptized, renegade Jews". Looking back on the period in October 1937, the PNL's Ion Inculeț boasted: "Even when the Jewish Party ran its own lists, the Jews would not vote for it, but favored the Liberal Party. On such grounds, I congratulate the Jewish populace." Another contributing factor was the growing number of minority voters who were disenfranchised by the successive governments: 120,000 to 135,000 Jewish men were reportedly stripped of their right to vote between 1920 and 1935. Only some thousands of Jews had moved to Palestine, although Landau had obtained a 75% reduction in passport fees for all Romanian Jewish emigrants. He himself left, with his entire family, in 1935.

==== CCER ====
By 1934, the party inner circle had been joined by Benvenisti, who formed and chaired a PER youth organization (Tineretul Partidului Evreiesc, TPE) alongside Sami Iakerkaner; new arrivals included Jean Cohen, a radical Zionist. Through Benvenisti and Cohen, the PER also acquired its only two Sephardi leaders. The 1937 issue of Romania's Jewish Yearbook listed Tivadar Fischer as the PER president, and Weissman as vice president; Benvenisti was simultaneously serving as general secretary and youth leader. A steering committee had been formed, counting as its members József Fischer, Wilhelm Fischer, Landau, Marton, L. B. Wexler, R. Bauberger, Cornel Iancu, Iancu Mendelovici, as well as Sami and Carol Singer. The party's Bucharest chapter was under Rosenstein, assisted by Segall. R. Bauberger, József Fischer, Landau, Marton, Segall and Sami Singer were also members of a Special Committee for the Jewish National Fund (JNF), which sought to help German Jews escape to Palestine.

The conflict with radical-right Romanians highlighted the political work of Zionist radicals. The Siguranța followed Zissu, who had returned from an extended stay in Berlin, as he resumed contacts with the Renașterea Noastră group and discussed sponsoring them. In February 1934, Hasmonaea club hosted a conference on the "Jewish Question" in Romania, with Romanian philosopher Constantin Rădulescu-Motru as arbiter. Guest speakers included Sami Singer (who introduced the general public to Zionist tenets), Mihai Ralea (who discussed sociological issues), and Henric Streitman (who spoke about Judaism). In late 1934, the party as a whole declared its support for government bonds which were meant to resupply the Romanian Land Forces. In mid 1934, the PER was still backing PNȚ candidates for the municipal elections of Iași, with Moscovici and Bercu Kelpner appearing on the campaign trail. During early 1935, there were municipal elections in Suceava. Rohrlich and five other "leading Jews from the Jewish party", as well as two UER men, were included on the PNL list, running against a PNȚ-led alliance that had no Jewish candidates. The situation was repeated for the elections in Orhei, where the PNL had a deal with both the PER and the "Israelite community" as a whole.

In April 1935, the Jewish Party lamented the "systematic and continuous persecution" of Jews by antisemitic forces, asking government to intervene; the PER noted that its constituents had "proven their love and devotion toward Country and Throne." Its activists were also facing violent opposition from the assimilationist youth. In February 1935, a rally of the Bucharest PER, hosted by Tivadar Fischer and Sami Singer at Izbânda Cinema, was crashed by "some two hundred Jewish students [...] shouting that Jews should not have their own separate party, but that they should be active within the existing parties. The scandal degenerated into a brawl opposing the students to other participants in that reunion."

Also in 1935, the PER, alongside the PNȚ and the Social Democrats, was approached by the illegal Romanian Communist Party (PCR) with an offer to form an antifascist "popular front", but the negotiations stalled. Gheorghe A. Lăzăreanu-Lăzurică, an organizer of the Romani minority and ally of the Romanian far-right, suggested at the time that all Jews "practice communism": "Depending on how the winds blow, sometimes they pretend to be assimilated, and sometimes national, Jews, [but] they all want to bring together a popular front, so they come under the protection of the International Jewish Alliance and threaten Romania with the intervention of foreign forums." According to Filderman, the PER was instead admired by Vaida-Voevod's breakaway group, the Romanian Front. Vaida had come to support a platform of racial segregation and Jewish quotas, and was seeking "collaboration" with the anti-assimilationist Jews. In early 1936, both the PER and the UER found themselves criticized by Grigore Iunian, of the left-wing nationalist Radical Peasants' Party. Iunian suggested that a popular front with the Jewish nationalists was out of the question: "We have been accused of philosemitism. We reject this insult; though we are also not antisemitic. [...] We fight against the Jewish Party and against the Union of Native Jews [...] for they stand as separate coalitions within our country, and are at risk of colliding with each other. We want instead a unitary coalition, to restore the people as a working force."

On January 26, 1936, the PER agreed to sign a pact of collaboration with the UER, together forming the Central Council of Romanian Jews (Consiliul Central al Evreilor din România, CCER), which fought in defense of Jewish rights and against antisemitic actions. On February 15, Mendelsohn and Isac Popper were elected as leaders of the Jewish Community in Iași, with backing from both the UER and the PER. Also elected as general secretary, Kelpner argued that the election meant a "union between the UER and the Jewish Party of Iași." However, the CCER did not represent "a third organization—added to or supplanting [the PER and UER]—nor a single body resulting from their fusion", and declared itself apolitical, committed to the defense Jews "within the framework of organic laws". In its appeal to the Romanian nation, the CCER excoriated the tenets of economic antisemitism, citing data which showed that Jews were a minority in enviable professions, and that, statistically, they were similarly exposed to the problems of the Great Depression in Romania, including homelessness and malnutrition. The CCER also defended itself against claims that it was stoking antisemitism, dismissing them as "cynical, with the purpose of making victims into culprits."

In February 1936, Ebner lamented the Romanian anti-immigration policy, which, he argued, was directly harmful for Jewish refugees from Nazism; he demanded that the League of Nations be mandated and armed to secure their relocation. Replying the PNȚ's Dreptatea, Ilariu Dobridor expressed his indignation, proposing that Ebner was purposefully conflating humanitarianism and free migration. Universul argued that Ebner's was an especially irresponsible position, directly against "the imperatives of our national policy", and that its adoption would have resulted in 500,000 Jews potentially relocating to Romania. Ebner then found himself indicted for "insulting the country" by a military tribunal in Bukovina. Ion Dumitrescu of Curentul joked that he could now expect to be defended by communists and "delinquents" as one of the "democratic martyrs in reactionary Romania", on par with Sacco and Vanzetti. Ebner's claim earned attention from jurist Istrate Micescu, who was theorizing "national sovereignty" and wanted to make antisemitic discrimination official. As he put it: "[Ebner] has abused the right as a guest, and behaved in such a way that he had to be declared an enemy." Physical attacks on Jewish activists and lawyers were renewed over the following months. In June, both Filderman and Sami Singer were injured by Traian Cotigă and other members of the Christian Bar Association.

Regional organizers of the PER
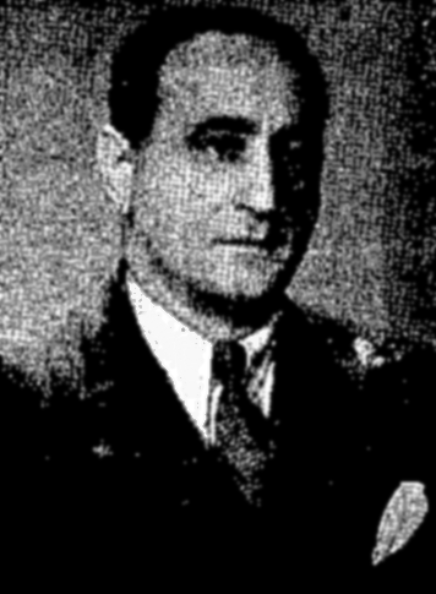
Mișu Benvenisti in 1948

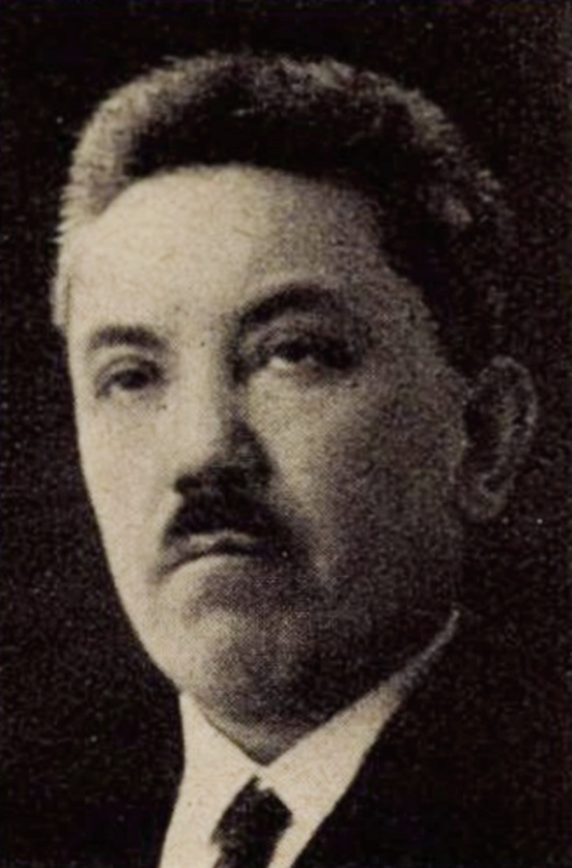
Max Diamant in 1931

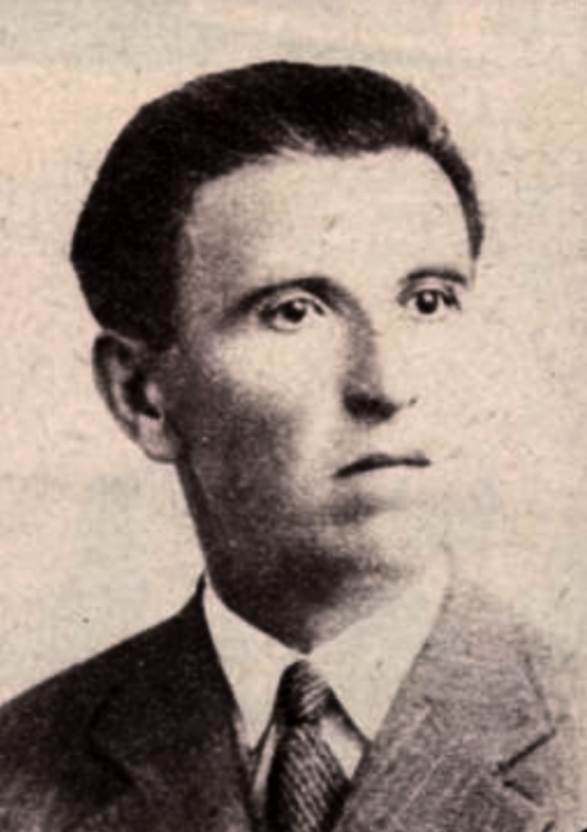
Manfred Reiffer in 1931

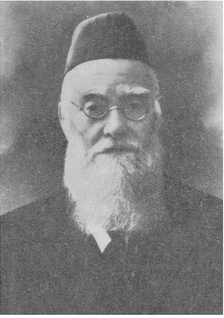
Yehuda Leib Tsirelson, c. 1930

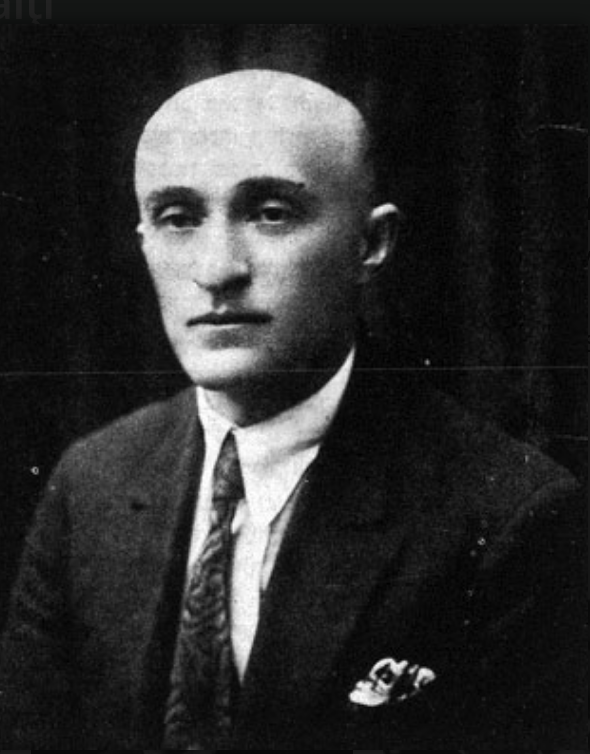
Isaia Tumarkin, c. 1930

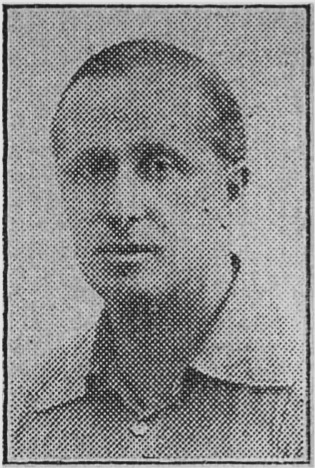
A. L. Zissu, c. 1934

==== 1937 debacle ====
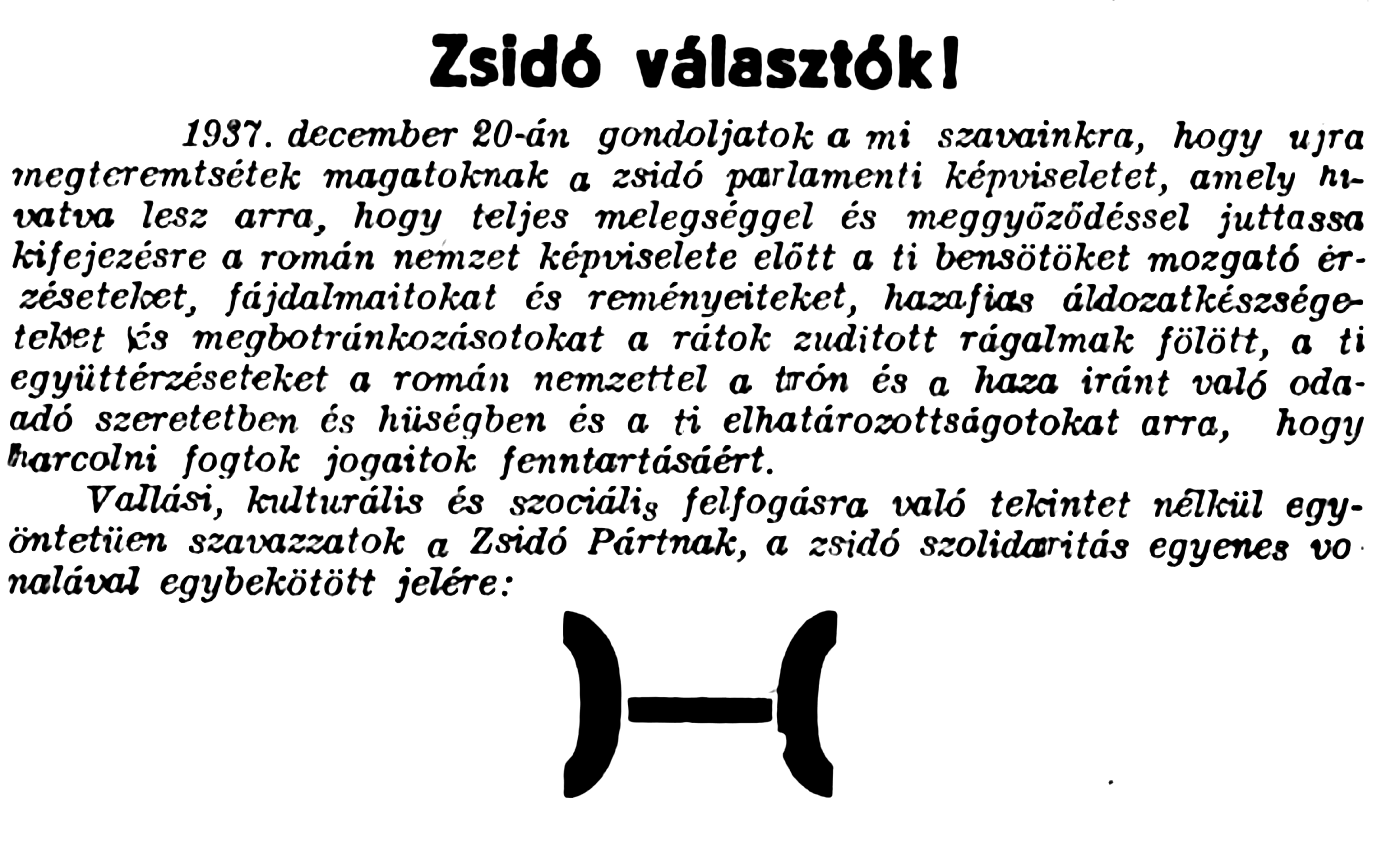
Fragment from the PER manifesto to its Hungarian-speaking voters (Zsidó választók), which includes the electoral symbol of the party, and "of Jewish solidarity", in preparation for the December elections

In the local elections of mid 1937, Rohlich appeared as a PNL candidate for the municipal council of Botoșani. The PER also had a pact with the PNL and Iunian's party in Bălți, but their alliance was narrowly defeated by the PNȚ. The latter's new leader, Ion Mihalache, was at the time agreeing with the LANC that "we do have something of a Jewish Question in Romania", proposing to tackle it by promoting economic nationalism: "cooperatives, instilling virtues in the youth, [and] State support for the Romanian element, allowing it to recover from a history of social, national and economic injustice." Mihalache noted that he endorsed a British proposal for the partition of Palestine, which would have resulted in a separate homeland for the Jewish people, to accommodate as many emigrants as possible. Also in 1937, the new World Jewish Congress (WJC) obtained the PER's affiliation, and, as noted by Benvenisti and Cohen, also organized its politicians into a network of informants. Sami Singer led this "spy ring" until September 1940, when he left Romania; Tivadar Fischer, Cohen, Mizrachi, Iosif Ebercohn and himself were active in that context. Weissman himself briefly left the PER, heading the Revisionist list in elections for representatives to the Twentieth Zionist Congress. On August 15, Tsirelson spoke at the World Agudath Israel congress in Karlovy Vary, where he pleaded for an Orthodox–Revisionist alliance: "I decree that all pious Jews must support the Jewish state. The main thing is to ensure the rule of the Torah."

Ahead of legislative elections in December, the PER announced that it would present its own candidates in all of Romania's counties, but only ended up covering most of these. In late November, it was still discussing an alliance with the UER. Published on December 5, the new party manifesto, was also signed by all three Fischers, as well as by Weissman, Sami Singer, Benvenisti, Tsirelson, Marton, Rosenstein, Mendelsohn, S. Rosenhaupt, Segall, Mizrachi, Kertész, Nobel, Markus Krämer, S. Nussbaum, Tumarkin, and Iakerkaner. It identified the PER with "Jewish parliamentary representation" as the "protective body of collective Jewish interests", inviting Jews to support it "regardless of your religious, cultural and social views". The document also explained that the PER would not caucus with the democratic opposition: "Those opposition parties [...] today feel compelled to avoid any actions or statements that would give their opponents the opportunity to prove that there is any kind of agreement between them and our country's Jewish population. Understandably, they basically had to resist any attempt at reaching out to the Jewish organizations."

This return to national politics was described as a provocation by the Sephardi polemicist Napoléon B. Arié, who was especially critical of the PER's promise to provide the Jews with a proportional representation in public offices. Arié also rejected Tsirelson's claim that only the PER could illustrate the existence of Jews as a nation, since "Romania's Parliament is not merely a diet of the nationalities." A similarly critical analysis was provided by Gheorghe Zane of the PNȚ chapter in Iași. At a regional rally on December 5, Zane remarked: "the submission of separate candidacies by the Jewish Party is a mistake—Jews should not be isolating themselves politically." An unnamed PNL leader from Bessarabia predicted on December 15 that the PER would not manage to collect many votes, since its candidates were "not at all liked by the Jews themselves." This situation was manifest in Brăila, where PER delegate David Cohn was faced with the hostility or indifference of local Jews; none of the six PER candidates in that section were born in the county, and the list had to be submitted with support from Christians—"not enough proponents could be recruited from Brăila's own Jews".

Several local alliances were still sealed. As reported in Curentul, the Magyar Party left Maramureș to the PER, which instead allowed its partner to "lure voters" from Hunedoara and Mureș. According to one report in Adevărul, the PER chapter in Botoșani only put up a symbolic fight against the PNL, having "some obligations left" from the previous deals. At the time, the Fischers had in fact agreed to a Transylvanian collaboration between the PER and the National Peasantists, though maintaining separate lists. This move sparked outrage when it became apparent that the PNȚ had a non-aggression pact with the Iron Guard. According to Zissu, the situation signified a "betrayal of the Jewry's interests". Benvenisti also called Fischer's tactic a "grave mistake." In a 1946 plea, PNȚ leader Iuliu Maniu argued that the agreement was solely for electoral transparency and against government fraud. He recalled that the PER and the Social Democrats had adhered to it on November 26, 1937, which was one day after the Guard; according to Maniu, this indicated that the pact could not be read as condoning Guardist antisemitism.

Nationally, the PER won 1.42% of the vote, again below the electoral threshold. The only parliamentarian still representing Jews was Chief Rabbi Jacob Itzhak Niemirower, who held a supplementary seat in Senate. He was twice physically assaulted by LANC militants. The Jewish Party was touched by the antisemitic laws first reintroduced by the National Christian Party (PNC) government of Octavian Goga in the final days of 1937. Weissman, by then the PER's vice president, was suspended from the Bucharest Bar, following a review of his Romanian citizenship; in all, some 30% of the Romanian Jews being eventually stripped of their citizenship rights.

On January 20, 1938, with early elections looming, the PER chapters in Transylvania announced that they would not field any candidates of their own, but considered backing one of the opposition groups. This decision was rescinded later that month: following laws against electoral symbolism, the PER applied for the system which granted each party list a number of dots. It was assigned eighteen dots, corresponding to its ballot position. At the time, N. B. Arié voiced his belief that "Jews are too numerous next to the Romanian population". Moscovici and Renașterea Noastră reacted strongly against this claim, leading Arié to sue them for libel. Meanwhile, Új Kelet denounced Mihalache, who had allegedly issued statements calling for a "total elimination of the Jews". On behalf of Romania's Jews, the party sent petitions to Prime Minister Goga, in which they claimed that the disenfranchisement of Transylvanian Jews was illegal under international law; as Új Kelet noted, the party was now unsure of how many of its supporters could still legally vote in the scheduled election.

=== Forced hiatus ===
==== 1938 outlawing ====
Interwar flag used by a Rădăuți section of Betar, the Revisionist Zionist organization; includes the menorah and a reference to Abba Ahimeir, for whom the section was named

The PER was again drawn into cooperation with the UER, issuing common protests against the antisemitic encroachment, and reestablishing the CCER. It intensified support for clandestine emigration into Palestine, and organized the Totzeret Haaretz campaign (preferential imports from Palestine, and a boycott of Romanian merchandise). The latter policy, thought of by Filderman, effectively toppled Goga and his cabinet in February 1938, but could not overturn antisemitic laws. During a reshuffle in 1937, the PER elected Cohen as its general secretary, its committee now comprising Benvenisti, Ebercohn, and Moscovici. Marton, unofficially the "leader of Hungarian Jews in Transylvania", contributed an article in Új Kelet which asked Jews to carry on as "loyal, trusting, conscious citizens of The Country". The CCER's mandate was renewed, with Niemirower, Filderman and Tivadar Fischer as its steering triumvirate. It set as its goal the recruitment of "other bodies of the country's Jewry and those Jewish entities that had so far been completely distant from any Jewish political activity."

This was to be the last interwar team of the PER: along with all other parties extant in Romania, it was dissolved on March 30, 1938 by King Carol II, who went on to establish the catch-all National Renaissance Front (FRN). Jews were the only ethnic community whose members were explicitly barred from joining. A delegation comprising József Fischer, Filderman and Niemirower tried to obtain that this policy be reversed, and talked the issue over with Silviu Dragomir, FRN Minister for Minorities. Dragomir informed them that the ban could "not yet" be reviewed, since Romania was actively seeking to please Germany. Historian Petre Țurlea, reviewing period reports by the Gendarmerie, assesses: "throughout the entire period that the Front existed, there was a tendency of Jews to attain membership, sometimes going so far as to falsify civil registers. So desiring were they to be counted as members of the single party that some of those who had been rejected would still wear FRN badges, as attested in all regions." As late as 1940, Jews such as publisher Elias Șaraga were sending applications for membership.

Jews were also banned from creating their own parties, although Tivadar Fischer obtained a reprieve for the HeHalutz bodies, which could be reestablished under new names. In September 1938, he tried to persuade the authorities not to shut down Unser Zeit, which was by then Romania's only Yiddish daily. The FRN regime encouraged mass emigration as an alternative to political representation, and a concrete relocation plan was suggested to Carol's ministers by Filderman. This context contributed to the advent of Revisionist Zionism in Romania, which was now represented by Betar and by Edgar Kanner's clandestine Revisionist Party. A Romanian Police report for 1940 argued that local Zionism had split into Niemirower and Sami Singer's left-wing branch, of "Jews with anti-Romanian sentiments", and Kanner's movement. The latter had channeled support from most Zionist organizations, including the right-wing Tnuat HaMizrahi, Bnei Akiva, and Brit HaKanaim Barak, but also Labor Zionists from Borochovia, Gordonia, Hashomer Hatzair, Poale Zion, and Tze'irei Zion, and trans-ideological bodies such as HaNoar HaTzioni (HH), ORT, HIAS, and the Romanian WIZO.

Organizational activity in view of relocation also fell on the HH, which established branches (snifim) throughout the country, with a central one being a farm in Floreasca. In April 1938, Wilhelm Fischer, Carol Singer and Ernő Vermes traveled with Niemirower to Jerusalem, "to investigate the possibility of increased immigration for the Romanian Jews and to intervene with Zionist forums towards ensuring this." Țurlea argues that the Zionist emigration current was consolidated by the antisemitic restrictions, a move up from its previous status as "insignificant". He also notes that few of the emigrants were permanently departed, citing a November 1939 report by Marcu Beza, the Romanian Consul in Palestine. According to Beza, a majority of Romanian Jews in Palestine had concluded that Romania was preferable, and were overwhelming the Consulate with repatriation requests; "there was even a newly-established body organizing their illegal return to Romania."

Niemirower had a seat in Carol's new Senate to his death in late 1939. In March 1940, the seat went to a new Chief Rabbi, Alexandru Șafran. With backing from Tivadar Fischer and Filderman, he was able to block a law project which would have prevented Jewish physicians from practicing, as well as obtaining guarantees that some Jews would still be allowed to work in other fields. The FRN's decline was marked in mid 1940 by a Soviet occupation of Bessarabia and Northern Bukovina, the first of several territorial changes which split the PER's old constituency. Antisemitic factions of the FRN circulated claims that Jews were to be held responsible for the Soviet advances—Rabbi Șafran attended a special Senate meeting where Cuza, now an FRN dignitary, apparently tried to have him lynched. He was ultimately able to submit a statement on behalf of all Romanian Jews, who thereby declared themselves "united with the Romanian people in national solidarity and discipline, in profound patriotic faith, and in deep devotion to King and Country." The Senate was dissolved by Carol on July 6, 1940, leaving the Jews entirely unrepresented. The same day Renașterea Noastră published parts of the speech Șafran had prepared, assuring Romanians of the Jews' "ardent and sincere" patriotism. Of the former PER leaders, the elderly Diamant opted to stay behind in Bukovina; he was deported by the Soviet occupiers to the Gulag, where he died some time after.

==== Holocaust and resistance ====
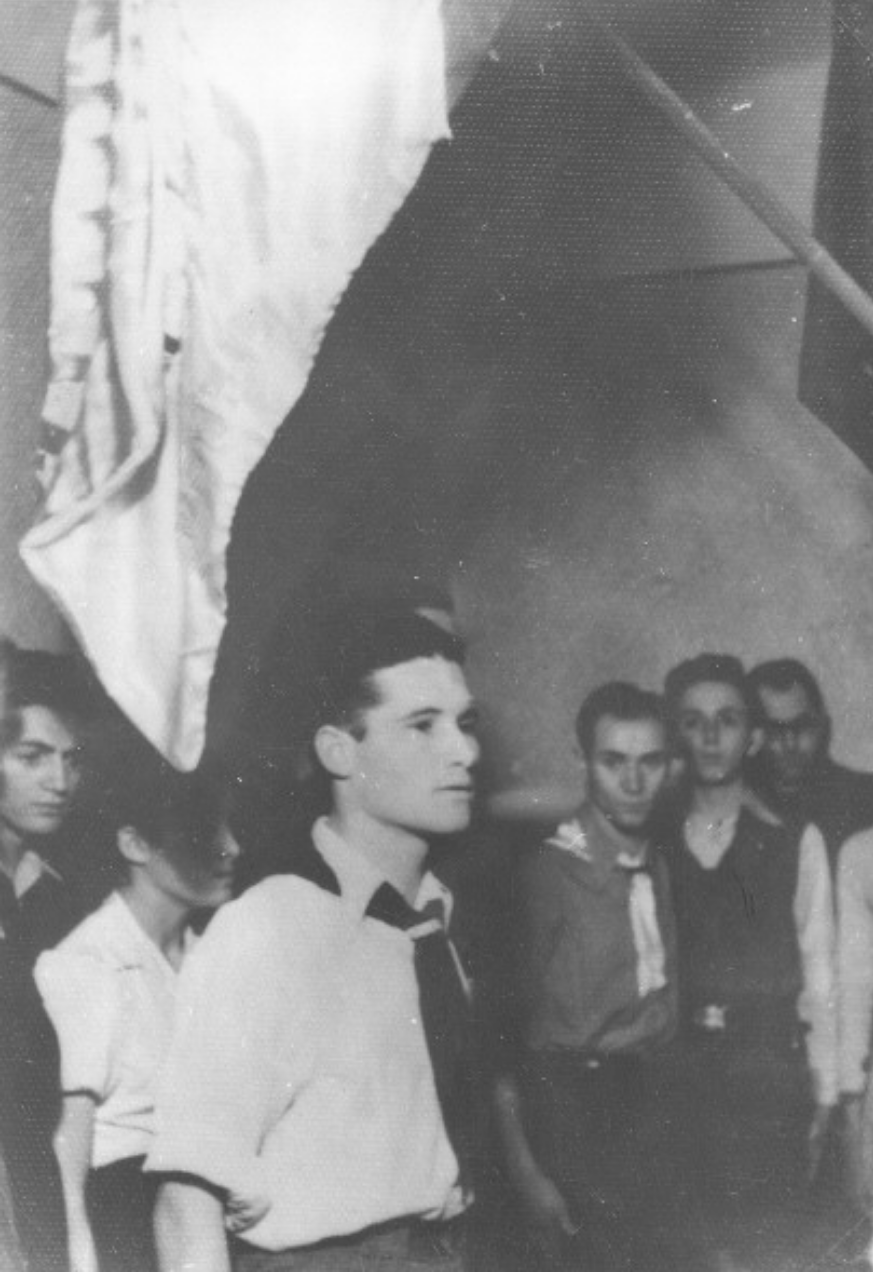
Roll call of the HeHalutz in Bucharest, 1941

Under FRN government pressures, EZNSz/UNET created an apolitical, regional, replacement for the PER. Called Social Zionist Council (Consiliul Sionist Social), it grouped together the Fischers and other former party members. It continued to exist until the Second Vienna Award, when Northern Transylvania was ceded by Romania to Hungary; it was banned in September 1940. Tivadar Fischer, József Fischer, and Marton remained on Hungarian territory. In 1944, they were moved into Kolozsvár Ghetto, where the former two functioned as Judenrat members, answering to Rudolf Kastner (Fischer's son-in-law) and Dieter Wisliceny. Marton also stayed behind in Cluj, writing works which looked beyond fascism to a future "new Emancipation". The party was decimated by the Nazis, with all three of its Năsăud candidates in the 1931 election being killed in extermination camps. The Fischers were among the 300 Jews for whom Kastner obtained a reprieve from extermination at Auschwitz. They were instead transported by the Nazis to Bergen-Belsen, and subsequently allowed to leave for Switzerland.

Other former party cells existed in Nazi-aligned Romania. EZNSz/UNET maintained a presence in southern Transylvania and the Banat, under Wilhelm Fischer and Carol Reiter. Recommended by his brother Tivadar, Fischer was also a liaison with international Zionism, which allowed him to establish the WJC bureau in Bucharest in 1941. Also here, FRN officials allowed Weissman and Sami Singer to canvass for the JNF, and set up a Zionist Union dedicated to the emigration project. Among the Jews who took this route in 1940 was PER activist Ebner, followed in 1941 by Mizrachi.

Governed by Ion Antonescu from late 1940, Romania participated in Operation Barbarossa during mid-1941, recovering its lost territories in the east. Renașterea Noastră continued to appear in Bucharest until 1942, with Moscovici, L. B. Wexler, and Badi Mendel as its editors. One article by Wexler celebrated Antonescu's decision to partake in the anti-Soviet war, as a victory for Romanian nationalism. The authorities remained invested in the promotion of antisemitic violence, which escalated greatly with the Iași pogrom. Tumarkin was a survivor of the latter, and later testified about the Gendarmerie's role in murdering Jewish civilians. The Antonescu government proceeded with confiscations of Jewish property and, once it had established bases on the Eastern Front, began the Bessarabian Jews' deportation into the Transnistria Governorate. Opposing the collaborationist Central Jewish Office, both Zissu and his Zionist rival Benvenisti spent terms in Romanian jails or concentration camps.

Reiffer, fearing fascism, had opted to remain in Soviet territory, where he only narrowly escaped Diamant's plight. He was also arrested by the returning Romanians and sent to Transnistria; he eventually fled to Palestine. Rabbi Tsirelson appeared "in full regalia" to welcome the Romanian army as it recaptured Chișinău, but was shot, along with all members of his delegation. His killing was disguised by the regime as a Soviet bomb attack. Rohlich, meanwhile, was among the non-Bessarabians who found themselves deported to Transnistria, though Șafran was able to obtain pardons for the HeHalutz groups, as well as for Religious Zionists registered as the Bnei Akiva and the Torah VeAvoda. On behalf of the Jewish Communities' Federation, Șafran established an Autonomous Aid Commission, with Fred Șaraga as its rapporteur. It sought to document deportations and protect victims thereof. The relief effort, which began in January 1942, was organized by a commission which included two PER figures—Benvenisti and Ebercohn—alongside Șaraga, Poldi Filderman, Marco Prezente, Arnold Schwefelberg and others. In August–September 1942, the Antonescu regime was considering the deportation of Banat Jews for extermination in Majdanek—the plan became known to Jewish leaders when Benvenisti, as head of the Zionist Executive, overheard Commissioner Radu Lecca discussing some details. Zissu, Wilhelm Filderman and Reiter played a part in persuading Antonescu and Lecca not to carry it through.

By 1943, after establishing direct contacts with Deputy Premier Mihai Antonescu, Zissu obtained from the regime that all Romanian Jews be allowed to leave for Palestine, as an alternative to deportation. He helped organize the sea transports through to Turkey and Palestine, and resumed contacts with Marton, together with whom he helped smuggle in Hungarian Jews. At odds with Filderman and with many of the Yishuv sponsors, he gathered crucial support from the Zionist resistance organizer, Shaike Dan Trachtenberg. In all, Zissu claimed to have personally rescued some 14,000 Jews in this manner, and was credited with fitting at least seven individual transports, including the ill-fated Mefküre. At some point during his humanitarian campaign, Zissu had considered reestablishing the PER as part of the underground movement against Antonescu. He held talks over the issue with Cornel Iancu (who had reportedly served as PER general secretary) and Benvenisti. Forced out of the Zionist executive by early 1944, Benvenisti rallied with a new underground party, the Zionist Democratic Group Klal—which included the Renașterea Noastră group and "centrist" parts of the HH—, serving as its chairman. In 1942, Cohen had also joined the Klalists, though he considered himself a PER general secretary for the entire period of 1938 to 1944. By 1943, he was directly involved in the unification project, hoping to make Zissu into a leader of "the most representative and encompassing Jewish political party."

=== Revived PER ===
==== Reestablishment and anti-communism ====
Antonescu's downfall on August 23, 1944 allowed Jewish political life to resume a legal course. On August 30, Zissu published a "Manifesto of the Jewish Party", which congratulated democratic forces for their "manly decisiveness". It pledged Jewish support for Premier Constantin Sănătescu, as well as "ruthless combat against fascism of any kind". Re-founded, with Zissu as president, on September 18, the PER resumed its participation in the WJC on November 19. The latter reunion was hosted by Wilhelm Fischer on Popa Rusu Street, in Bucharest's Armenian Quarter. Zissu was present, but Filderman made a point of absenting. The PER was still organizing itself a year later; as Benvenisti notes, none of the PER's old senators or deputies were still living in Romania in the late 1940s. He and Wilhelm Fischer were selected as vice presidents; the leadership council included, among others, Cohen, Ebercohn, Iakerkaner, Kanner, Mendelovici, Moscovici, Rohrlich, Rosenthal, Tumarkin, Leon Itzacar, Iacov Litman, and Elias Schein. Filderman's UER was also reestablished and recruiting, but soon lost a cohort of members to Zissu's group. Their leader, Kiva (or Chiva) Orenștein, was subsequently co-opted on the PER council. Zissu later promoted Cohen to the position of PER secretary, and made Itzacar the party's financial administrator.

Already in August 1944, Cohen had represented Zissu on the General Jewish Council (CGE), which met in the home of Leon Ghelerter; painter M. H. Maxy was the PCR representative. According to Cohen, the Jewish Party was represented therein, but ultimately expelled by Filderman; instead, the CGE recruited Jewish members of the PNL and PNȚ. In an opinion piece for Universul, lawyer Iosif G. Cohen argued that the CGE was a reasonable enterprise, whereas the Jewish Party was not—he noted: "Jews must not constitute themselves into a political minority of any kind". On October 5, 1944, a PER communiqué was released, informing the party base that it welcomed a PCR initiative of unifying "all democratic forces" into a governing bloc. It also lauded the PCR for publicizing a "vast program of national and social demands, of the kind that are urgently needed at present for the democratization of public life within the state, as well as for fulfilling the needs of a great mass of the country's people."

The PCR was moving in to exercise control over the entire CGE. This caused the latter institution to fall apart before the end of 1944, its members having explicitly rejected the notion that "all Jews are communists". The PER found itself at odds with the governing and expansive PCR, as well as with its Jewish Democratic Committee (CDE), formed in June 1945 as part of the National Democratic Front. While formally presided upon by Maxy, the CDE was informally supervised by PCR man Vasile Luca, who spoke at the Committee's founding congress to repudiate all forms of Zionism—though he also formally rejected any notion that the CDE was a communist front. Zissu considered letting the PER be absorbed into the CDE, sending Ebercohn and Iakerkaner to negotiate. He then realized that the Committee was not politically neutral.

Logo of the PER's centrist rival, HaOved HaTzioni

In 1945, Romanian Police had continued to keep tabs on the Zionist movement, including its Betar right, with its informants noting: "for all their mask as anticommunists, we are not ashamed to say that these Betarist Jews are still Jews". The same report concluded: "As luck would have it, the Jews can't seem to agree with each other, or otherwise we'd be seeing battalions of armed Jews in our country, if not indeed a mass revolt, whether theirs, on the offensive, or of the right-wing [Romanian] parties, against them." A "Jewish left" was on the rise, with the Ihud party at its forefront; it absorbed the older Gordonia movement, and reported some 25,000 members. Smaller groups in this ideological field included Miflaga, Mișmar, and a Bukovina section of the Poale Zion, called Ahdut HaAvoda. "Centrism" was embraced by the Klal-Zionist Party of Romania, successor to the HH and the home of two other smaller groups—Dor Hadash and Hașmonea. The latter two would later form another group, the HaOved HaTzioni. Independent Revisionist groups also appeared, in particular Hatzahar and Transylvania's Brit Yesorun. Religious Zionism had by then similarly parted with the PER, and coalesced into the Tnuat HaMizrahi. Jean Cohen recounts that the WJC and the Ihud wanted the UER and the PER to merge under Filderman's chairmanship, with Zissu only serving as honorary president; Tivadar Fischer would make his return to Romanian Jewish politics by steering the local WJC chapter from his home in Geneva. The plan was never carried out, largely due to Zissu and Cohen's opposition.

Zissu still "hoped for a truly democratic change in Romania, as the one chance for Jews to obtain citizenship rights". Cohen explained at the time that the PER stood for "national autonomy", which also allowed for Jewish proportional representation and even participation in government. According to him, those who understood this call also knew that "there is no means of political representation more prestigious and more efficient, precisely because it is independent, than the Jewish Party of Romania." As reported by Cohen, the traditional PNȚ–PER relationship was tested when the former's leader, Iuliu Maniu, refused to pledge his support for the restoration of Jewish assets and political liberties. Confronted with communization from 1945, Zissu sketched out a two-stage plan for the Jewish community: a short-term recognition for the Jews as a distinct ethnic minority; later, its mass emigration to Palestine. This policy was rejected outright by Gheorghe Vlădescu-Răcoasa, the Minister for Minorities, who refused to award ethnic recognition to the Jews and, the PER suspected, blocked out pledges of financial support for Holocaust survivors.

While Zissu was being denigrated in the PCR and CDE press, the PER had developed its own moderate wing, led by Benvenisti. The latter once defined himself as having had a "left-wing orientation [...] from back during the war", including support for a "people's democracy". In March 1945, Benvenisti had attended a Dor Hadash congress, where he noted that Zionism enjoyed support from the world's "most radically progressive circles", variously including the Communist Party USA and the Soviet trade unions. According to Benvenisti, once Zionism would have solved the "Jewish Question", "fascist circles will have revealed themselves for their true, unmasked, self: enemies of democracy, proving that we Jews were but their mere pretext."

==== Disintegration ====
Both Cohen and Itzacar had defected earlier in 1946 to join the Klal, which eventually took control of Zissu's political journal, called Mântuirea. At a general meeting called by Benvenisti on July 7, 1946, the reformed PER voted a new leadership committee, comprising Ebercohn, Wilhelm Fischer, Doctor Harschfeld, Iancu, Itzacar, Iakerkaner, Kanner, M. Rapaport, Rohrlich, Leon Rozenberg, Rosenthal, and Tumarkin. Also then, the PER announced that it would present an independent list for the general election of November, this being the wish expressed by a "near-unanimity of its members". Ten days later, it delegated Tumarkin to sign a pact with the CDE. This also implied congregating with the PCR's Bloc of Democratic Parties (BPD). On July 14, the TPE in Hunedoara County, represented by "Comrade Abraham", attended a rally of the BPD's Union of Progressive Youth. On July 21, Zissu accepted his defeat and resigned from the PER presidency (being followed shortly after by general secretary Moscovici); he was later forced out from the Zionist Executive by a cartel of CDE and Ihud members.

Taking over as interim president, Benvenisti appointed S. Segall as the PER's new secretary. These developments reportedly alarmed Filderman, who asked Cohen to reintegrate with the PER and stem its infiltration by communism. On October 10, 1946, PER delegates Ebercohn and Rohrlich sealed an alliance with the BPD; this policy was reaffirmed on October 27, when a "shared meeting of all Jewish organizations" was held at Izbânda of Bucharest. Shortly after, Zissu voiced his regret "that the Jewish party never managed to present its own lists", but encouraged PER members "to vote for the government lists." The resulting Jewish Representation, also including the UER and the CDE, was assigned three positions on the BPD list; it had for a main candidate Rohrlich, who ran in Botoșani County. Benvenisti claims that this was an act of dissidence by other PER members: they allegedly profited from Benvenisti's brief absence from the country to strike him off the shared list, assigning his place to Rohlich, who was not as friendly toward the CDE; during that interval, the PER was steered by a triumvirate comprising Ebercohn, Tumarkin, and Iakerkaner. On the campaign trail, communist leaders embraced Zionist slogans, with Luca declaring himself favorable to a Jewish state in Palestine, when addressing an all-Jewish audience, and the official newspaper Timpul hosting reportage pieces about life in the Yishuv. The campaign saw Zionists participating on BPD electoral squads, which destroyed propaganda presented by opposition parties, but also witnessed attempts at anti-BPD resistance by Jewish defectors from the PCR. During the race, an independent, religious Zionism was only represented by Tnuat HaMizrahi.

The PER failed to get any of its candidates elected, its votes having only helped CDE front-runners. On November 30, Zionists had a final public rally in Bucharest, celebrating the United Nations Partition Plan for Palestine. In the post-election interval, the PER returned to anti-communism. Shortly before the eruption of a civil war in Palestine, Siguranța men reported that Zissu still directed the PER from the shadows, noting his Revisionist, anti-British, stance and his support of "terrorist action" in Palestine. In March 1947, Benvenisti made a show of his own disappointment with the BPD government, accusing Prime Minister Petru Groza of tolerating antisemitism. By then, PCR cadres defected to the PER, including two who helped found a PER section in Fălciu County; one of them was also a leader of the local Betar organization, which the CDE described as "fascist". Some members of the PER elite were leaving Romania for Palestine, as was the case with Wilhelm Fischer in summer 1947.

Logo of the Union of Working Youth, which absorbed the final remnants of the PER youth movement

According to an overview by historian Claudiu Crăciun, "communist attempts to assume control over the Jewry were effectively damaged, for the long term, by its majority Zionist orientation." During August 1947, the group assisted in forming new local bodies for the Jewish communities. The one in Iași was led by L. Weiselberg of the PCR, with PER man Aron Alter as general secretary. In late November 1947, Enercohn was registered as a PER delegate on the board of "Jewish obști and democratic organizations" which visited with Culture Minister Stanciu Stoian to demand from him that Filderman be ousted from his job at the Federation of Jewish Communities.

Following the establishment of a Romanian communist regime on the last days of 1947, Benvenisti still made an appearance at the WJC in Montreux, sharing the stage with CDE representative Bercu Feldman. He recalls that the PER was dissolved at some point in 1947, upon Feldman's suggestion. Benvenisti elaborates: "I dissolved the Jewish Party, believing that there is no longer a need for it under the current regime." According to a notice in Adevărul: "The steering committee of the Jewish Party of Romania has decided to dissolve the party on December 4, 1947". Other reports suggest that a PER was still functioning in May 1948, when its representatives issued a statement regarding the Israeli Declaration of Independence, and that communist censors intervened to have it unpublished. On June 11, 1948, all Zionist organizations were shut down. The TPE wing and HeHalutz still existed to July 1948, when, together with the CDE, UER and Hașmonea youth movements, they were voluntarily absorbed into the National Federation of Democratic Youth (FNTD). The latter acted as a front for the PCR until March 1949, when it was altogether absorbed by the Union of Working Youth—presided upon by the last FNTD chairman, Gheorghe Florescu.

==== Final purges ====
Over those months, a propaganda and intimidation campaign was taken up by the CDE and the PCR. There followed clashes between the pro-communists and religious groups such as the Bnei Akiva, which led to the Zionist issue being assigned directly to the Securitate secret police. At a communist party summit in October 1948, Luca issued an order barring all categories of Zionists from attending CDE meetings, defining the Committee as an "instrument of the Party for the recruitment of the Jewish masses"; this proposal was endorsed by Gheorghe Gheorghiu-Dej, who equated Zionism with fascism and American spy rings. Arrested in 1949, Orenștein passed through the infamous Sighet, Pitești, and Jilava prisons. Until 1953, he was discreetly allowed to survive by communist leader Ana Pauker, who knew him from her days as a Hebrew-language teacher. He died in jail in 1955, a result of having been tortured by Eugen Țurcanu during a reeducation experiment on behalf of the Securitate. Some former Zionists had by then joined the Communist Party. In 1950, they were singled out among the 5.6% undesirables whom the party wanted purged from its ranks.

In May of that year, the PCR Central Committee ruled that Zionism, including in its leftist forms, was "counterrevolutionary", and promised to deal with the WJC as an organ of the "internationally Jewish grand bourgeoisie". This decision came with mass arrests of Zionist militants, followed by their torturing and nine separate waves of show trials, lasting to 1959. The first such group, comprising Revisionists Kanner, Șlomo Șinovitzer, Marcel Tăbăcaru and Pascu Schechter, was sentenced in July 1953; in November, sentences were also handed down to Litman and to Benvenisti's wife Suzana. Ebercohn, Iakerkaner, Cornel Iancu, Rohrlich and Tumarkin were sentenced, alongside Theodor Loewenstein-Lavi and Menahem Fermo, in May 1954; this affair was closely followed by Itzacar's prosecution. Another trial staged in 1954 for thirteen Zionist leaders, including Zissu, Benvenisti, and Moscovici.

In previous interrogations, the Securitate had confronted Zissu and Benvenisti, who still resented each other. According to Benvenisti's deposition, Zissu had been removed from the PER "for his systematic and spiteful refusal of any collaboration with the Jewish Democratic Committee". Zissu himself noted that he intended to settle in Israel and for a "Biblical socialist" party, which he opposed to all forms of Marxism, whereas Benvenisti looked forward to joining the Israeli Communists. In 1956, Zissu and Benvenisti received permission to emigrate from Deputy Premier Emil Bodnăraș; Zissu died soon after settling in. Benvenisti returned to public life as an Israeli diplomat with the Jewish Agency for Israel. Before his death in 1977, he set up a fund for the study of Romanian Jewish history. Chief Rabbi Moses Rosen also obtained that other former prisoners be given the right to sail for Israel in 1957. His list included Ebercohn, Iakerkaner, Iancu, Itzacar, Kanner, Litman, Rohrlich, Tumarkin, and Orenștein's widow Mina. Cohen was similarly allowed to travel with Zissu, and was reportedly the last Romanian Jew to be able to leave the country with his books. A member of the Knesset, in 1963 he was attempting to set up a special Romanian Israeli lodge of the B'nai B'rith.

Before Zissu and Benvenisti's arrival, an Israeli Romanian Association (Hitachdut Olei Romania) had been established, with Mizrachi serving as its chairman in 1944–1946. Their former PER colleague Rosenthal took over in later years, drawing the Association into an alliance with the Israel Workers' Party. Meanwhile, Marton, praised for his humanitarian work with deportees regaining republican Hungary, had also moved to Israel, and was putting out a new edition of Új Kelet. In late 1948, Sami Stern also began putting out Renașterea Noastră from Tel Aviv; around that same time, Weissman was serving as Israel's diplomatic agent in Belgium.

In 1954, PER founder Ebner was also living in Tel Aviv, publishing memoirs as "the oldest of the three remaining survivors of the First Zionist Congress." By then, Landau was enjoying a successful career in his new country, which included his founding of Mifal HaPais, the Israeli national lottery, in 1951; "for years on end, his likeness decorated the tickets issued". He was active with the Klal's leftist wing, and later helped establish an Israeli Progressive Party; ahead of the 1965 municipal elections, he formed an independent list of "Romanian and Transylvanian citizens [who] were not adequately represented". Sami Singer, based in Haifa, also joined the Progressives, but did not pursue political offices in the Jewish state. Tivadar Fischer lived in Geneva to his death in 1972. Though he engaged in efforts to obtain compensation for Holocaust survivors, he was "unable to find his spiritual inner-harmony", and would not consider settling in Israel.

== Electoral history ==
=== Legislative elections ===
Election	Votes	%	Assembly	Senate	Position
1931	64,193	2.3	4 / 387	0 / 113	11th
1932	67,582	2.3	5 / 387	0 / 113	11th
1933	38,565	1.3	0 / 387	0 / 108	11th
1937	43,681	1.4	0 / 387	0 / 113	9th
