= Adolphe Stern =

Jewish-Romanian lawyer and politician

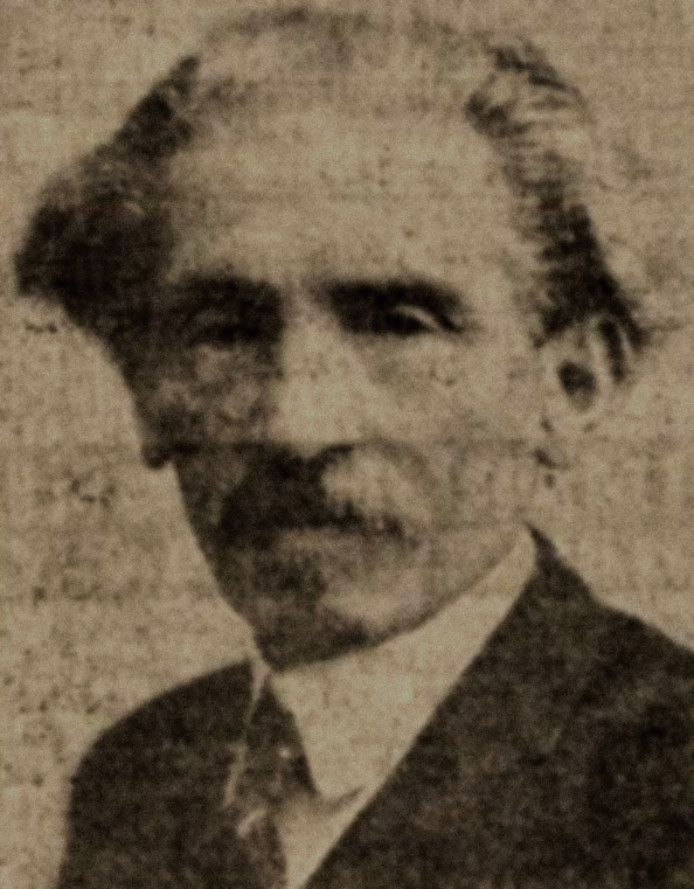
Stern, photographed c. 1920

Adolphe Stern (November 17, 1848 – October 18, 1931) was a Jewish-Romanian lawyer and politician.

== Life ==
Stern was born on November 17, 1848, in Bucharest, Romania.

The son of a jeweler, Stern went to study law in Berlin after finishing high school in Bucharest. He then received his law degree from the Leipzig University in 1869, making him Romania's first Jewish lawyer. He then returned to Romania and became secretary to the American Consul to Romania, Benjamin F. Peixotto. With Peixotto's encouragement, he and his brother Leopold published the Rumänische Post, a newspaper that focused on issues relevant to the Romanian Jewish community. He also contributed to Jewish and secular Romanian publications, including Adevărul literar și artistic (The Artistic and Literary Truth) and the German-language review Bukarester Salon. He published translations of 19th-century Romanian writers in the latter publication, and his work in translating Schiller, Goethe, Heine, D’Annunzio, and Shakespeare into Romanian was acclaimed by the intelligentsia and played a key role in him being granted Romanian citizenship in 1880. When Peixotto left his position as Consul, Stern became America's Honorary Consul to Romania.

In 1872, Stern founded the Infraitrea Zion (Zion's Brotherhood) with Peixotto, and he was elected its president when Peixotto left Romania in 1876. In 1889, it turned into the Order B'nai B'rith of Roumania, which was affiliated with the larger B'nai B'rith organization and which Stern was president of from its inception and until his death. In 1909, B'nai B'rith produced the Union of Native Jews, which fought for Jewish emancipation and which Stern as president of from its founding until his death. After he obtained citizenship himself in 1880, he became a successful lawyer and circulated the Codus Civil, a digest of common law with his commentaries that was circulated in the legal profession and was known as Codul Stern. He served as president of the Templul Coral at Bucharest for a long time.

Stern actively fought for Jewish emancipation since the 1878 Congress of Berlin, where he represented Romanian Jews and influenced delegates like Benjamin Disraeli and William Waddington to secure Jewish civil and public rights as well the naturalization of Jews in the Treaty of Berlin. His campaign against Jewish persecution in the country forced him to temporarily flee Romania in 1894 in order to escape an organized attack by Romanian students. The Romanian Parliament also attempted to exclude him from his law practice, although it was defeated by a small majority. He secured the interest of the Jewish former Italian Prime Minister Luigi Luzzatti in the cause of Romanian Jews in 1915, and in 1916 he went to Italy at Luzzatti's invitation and stayed there until the end of World War I. He also made contact with several political figures like Georges Clemenceau during the War to inform them of the situation with Romanian Jews and get their support in recognizing Romanian Jewish rights of Romanian citizenship.

In the 1922 Romanian general election, Stern was elected to the Romanian Parliament as a member of the Peasants' Party. He served in Parliament from 1922 to 1926, during which time he focused on the "Jewish question", the upsurge of anti-Semitism, private education, and bringing attention to discriminatory aspects of law with regard to minority rights. He supported the establishment of a National Jewish Party that would help Jews achieve political goals as an ethnic minority, although he was criticized for anachronistic views by Romanian Zionist leaders like Abraham Leib Zissu. He didn't support assimilation, and while he didn't consider himself a Zionist he enthusiastically greeted the Balfour Declaration and supported Keren Hayesod in Romania, especially after he travelled to Palestine in April 1910. He published his memoir Din viața unui evreu român (From the Life of a Romanian Jew) in 1915, followed by Însemnări din viața mea (Notes from My Life) in 1921. The last part of his journal was published in serial form in the Renașterea Noastră from 1929 to 1931. His memoirs and journal recorded his campaign for the emancipation of Jews and the tendencies of the Jewish Romanian society from the late 19th century to the 1920s.

In 1924, B'nai B'rith presented Stern with a marble bust, with Lucien Wolf honoring him in a speech when the bust was presented. He became honorary president of the Jewish Party upon its founding. His son served as that Party's secretary and was one of its candidates in the 1931 Romanian general election.

Stern died in Bucharest on October 18, 1931.
