= Yehuda Leib Tsirelson =

Romanian rabbi (1859–1941)

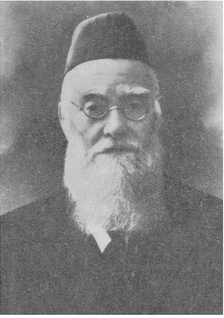

Senator of Romania
- In office 1920–1922

Member of the Chamber of Deputies of Romania
- In office 1922–1926

Mayor of Chișinău
- Acting
- In office 1923–1923

Chief Rabbi of Bessarabia
- In office 1918–1940

Personal details
- Born: December 24, 1859 Kozelets, Chernigov Governorate, Russian Empire
- Died: July 6, 1941 (aged 81) Chișinău, Moldavian SSR, USSR
- Party: Jewish Party of Romania
- Other political affiliations: World Agudath Israel; People's Party

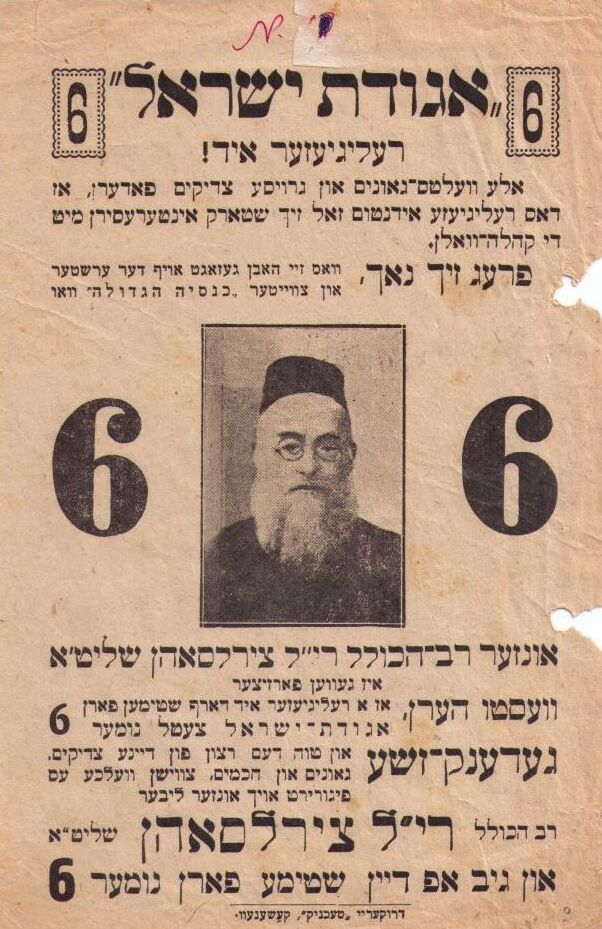
Campaign handbill for the Agudat Yisrael ticket in a community election in the 1930s

Yehuda Leib Tsirelson (24 December 1859 – 6 July 1941) was the Chief Rabbi of Bessarabia, a member of the Romanian parliament, and a prominent Jewish leader and posek.

== Biography ==
Yehuda Leib Tsirelson was the son of the Rabbi of Kozelets, Moishe Chayim. He was considered a prodigy at a young age and became the Rabbi of Priluki at the age of nineteen. During that time he began writing for various periodicals in Hebrew, Yiddish and Russian. His articles dealt mainly with ongoing Jewish issues, mostly of a political nature.

== Zionist activism ==
In 1898 he participated in the first all-Russian Zionist conference in Warsaw. At first he supported the Mizrachi movement and Zionism but later he became disappointed with the movement and left it, turning less moderate in his views.

== Rabbinic career ==
From 1880 he served as a rabbi in Poltava until in 1908 he was appointed religious and crown rabbi of Kishinev. In 1911 he was one of the signatories of a letter by 300 prominent Russian Rabbis against the antisemitic Beilis affair case. That same year he received the title of honorable citizen of Russian Empire. In 1912 he was among a core group of Jewish leaders and Rabbis who laid the foundation for the Agudat Israel movement. In 1918 Bessarabia became part of Romania and Rabbi Tsirelson was nominated Chief Rabbi of the whole Bessarabia. He developed there a Jewish educational system, beginning from kindergarten and ending with yeshiva. Many prominent rabbis, including future Rabbis of Rîbnița (Rabbi Chaim Zanvl Abramowitz) and Bohush, studied in his yeshiva. After the Soviet Union collapsed, the new Kishinev yeshiva was established in the building of the old one.

== Political career ==
Jacob Itzhak Niemirower and Yehuda Leib Tsirelson at the 1922 Coronation of King Ferdinand and Queen Maria of Romania

In 1920 having knowledge of the Romanian language he was elected to represent the Jews of Bessarabia in the Parliament of Romania in Bucharest. In 1922 he became the only Bessarabian Jewish representative in the parliament. While the antisemitism in Romania was strongly growing. In parliament Tsirelson tried to warn about the growing antisemitism in Romania, but the delegates refused to publish his speeches in the parliament periodical. As a result, Tsirelson resigned from parliament in 1926. In 1920 he established the Agudat Israel branch in Kishinev, which later became autonomous. He chaired two Agudat Israel councils in 1923 and 1929. In 1923 he strongly supported Meir Shapiro's idea of Daf Yomi. After the Soviet annexation of Bessarabia he was labeled by communist-backed newspapers as an anti-soviet agent. He was executed together with forty other Jewish leaders by the order of the Germans after they captured Kishinev in June 1941.

== Awards and recognition ==
Most of his works were published after his death in Israel and in the United States. His great-nephew was the Israeli mathematician Boris Tsirelson.
