= Max Diamant =

Bukovinian Jewish lawyer, activist, and Romanian politician (c. 1880–1941)

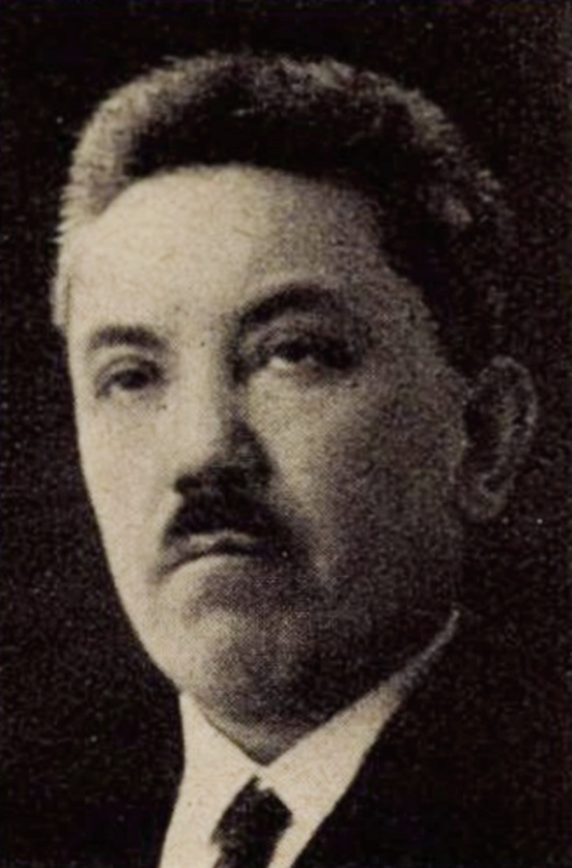
- Max Diamant in 1931

Member of the Chamber of Deputies
- In office 1931–1932
- Constituency: Storojineț County

Personal details
- Born: c. 1880 Czernowitz, Austria-Hungary
- Died: 1941 Siberia, Soviet Union
- Party: Jewish National People's Party; Jewish Party
- Education: Franz Joseph University of Czernowitz
- Profession: Lawyer, publicist, politician

Max Diamant (c. 1880 – 1941) was a Bukovinian Jewish lawyer, publicist, Zionist activist, cultural organizer, and politician. A Jewish nationalist active in Czernowitz (later Cernăuți) during the final decades of Austria-Hungary and the interwar period in Romania, he was a prominent advocate for Yiddish language rights, Yiddish theater, and Jewish heritage preservation, and served in the Parliament of Romania from 1931 to 1932. Following the Soviet occupation of Bessarabia and Northern Bukovina in 1940, he was deported by the NKVD to Siberia, where he died in 1941.

== Early life and education ==
Max Diamant was born around 1880, though some accounts give his birth year as 1878 and his birthplace as Czernowitz in the Duchy of Bukovina, then part of Austria-Hungary. He studied law at the Franz Joseph University in Czernowitz. During his university years, he participated in organizing Jewish student groups dedicated to fostering national consciousness among youth, and in 1897 he was one of the founding members of the Jewish student association Zephirah. By April 1900, he was active in public life, delivering lectures on 19th-century Jewish history. Diamant went on to practice law and received the degree of Doctor of Laws on 31 October 1913.

== Political career ==
=== Austro-Hungarian period ===
In 1906, Diamant was elected vice-president of the Jewish National Party of Bukovina (Jüdische Nationalpartei), a political organization led by Benno Straucher, a deputy in the Austrian Imperial Council. The party campaigned for the political representation of Jews and their recognition as a distinct nationality within the empire, a status closely tied to linguistic and cultural rights. Diamant was among the intellectuals who argued that Bukovinian Jews were entitled to autonomous national, political, and cultural institutions.

A close associate of Nathan Birnbaum, Diamant took part in organizing the Czernowitz Yiddish Language Conference, held in late August and early September 1908, which became a milestone in the promotion of Yiddish as a modern national language. In 1909, he applied to register a Jewish theatrical association whose bylaws were written in Yiddish. The Austrian authorities refused registration on the grounds that Yiddish was not an officially recognized language of the realm (Landessprache). Diamant challenged the decision before the Imperial Court in Vienna, which dismissed his appeal; local authorities in Czernowitz subsequently instructed him not to use Yiddish during the association's meetings.

=== Interwar Romania ===
Following World War I and the dissolution of Austria-Hungary, Diamant represented Bukovinian Jewry in post-war international diplomacy. In 1919, he served as a member of the Bukovinian delegation to the Comité des Délégations Juives at the Paris Peace Conference. Working alongside Markus Krämer under the guidance of Zionist leaders Nahum Sokolow and Leo Motzkin, he helped formulate demands for the economic reconstruction of Jewish communities and the inclusion of minority protection guarantees in international peace treaties.

After the Union of Bukovina with Romania, Diamant remained active in politics as the Jewish minority faced Romanianization policies and rising antisemitism. In 1931, he was elected to the Chamber of Deputies of the Parliament of Romania on the list of the Jewish Party, representing Storojineț County during the 1931–1932 legislative term.

== Cultural and heritage work ==
Alongside his legal and political activities, Diamant was a leading organizer of Yiddish cultural life in Czernowitz. In 1910, he founded the Jüdischer Theaterverein Abraham Goldfaden (Abraham Goldfaden Jewish Theater Association) with the goal of establishing a permanent Yiddish theater or drama school in the city. Growing from roughly 20 founding members to around 300 by 1923, the association sought to provide a stable cultural institution and preserve Jewish identity among both Yiddish-speaking and German-acculturated members of the community.

Diamant also devoted significant effort to documenting and preserving Bukovina's Jewish historical heritage. In 1927, he published an article on the old Jewish cemetery of Czernowitz in the Vienna journal Menorah. In 1929, together with Professor Emil Zappler, he established and led the Jewish Museum Society of Czernowitz, which gathered historic synagogue ritual objects and Jewish artistic artifacts from across Bukovina. In 1937, Diamant and Arthur Preiss co-authored Jüdische Volkskunst ("Jewish Folk Art"), published in Vienna and Jerusalem; the illustrated volume featured plates of traditional material culture alongside a historical study on the Khazars and the settlement of Eastern European Jews.

== Deportation and death ==
In June 1940, the Soviet Union occupied Northern Bukovina, including Cernăuți, following an ultimatum to Romania. Soviet authorities targeted the local social, economic, and cultural leadership, deporting approximately 3,000 members of the city's Jewish elite to the Soviet interior. Arrested by the NKVD during the 1940–1941 wave of deportations due to his Zionist activism, Diamant was sent to Siberia for forced labor and ideological re-education. He died in deportation in 1941 from starvation and forced labor and was buried in an unmarked grave; the specific Gulag camp and exact date of his death remain unknown.

== Selected works ==
- "Der alte jüdische Friedhof in Czernowitz", Menorah, 1927.
- Jüdische Volkskunst (with Arthur Preiss), Vienna and Jerusalem, 1937.
