= Union of Romanian Jews =

The Union of Romanian Jews (Romanian: Uniunea Evreilor Români, UER) was a political organisation active in Romania in the first half of the 20th century.

The UER targeted all Romanian Jews who had obtained citizenship and accepted its programme of integration into the Romanian state. It was organised based on geographic Jewish communities, without regard to social standing, and placed no restriction on membership. It did not consider itself a political party, but rather an action organisation that promoted Jewish interests.

In essence, it called for Jewish emancipation, and after the Union of Transylvania with Romania, for the consolidation of the rights that Jews had won and for the participation of all Romanian Jews in the country's political life. It fought for the easing of the citizenship process for Jews who arrived in Romania after 1918 and for the organisation of an autonomous cultural and religious life. Its official newspapers were Înfrăţirea ("Unity"; 1909-1919) and Curierul izraelit ("The Israelite Courier"; 1918-1940, 1944-1945).

== History ==
At first, the group was called the Union of Native Jews (Uniunea Evreilor Pământeni, UEP), founded in Bucharest on November 27, 1909. The UEP actively campaigned on behalf of Romanian Jews, addressing memoranda to the Romanian authorities and seeking help from abroad, especially from France and Great Britain. At the same time, it asked Jews to fulfill their duties toward the Romanian state, which had begun to grant them citizenship on an individual basis beginning in 1879.

At its February 1923 congress, the UEP became the UER and extended its activity into the whole country, greatly enlarged in the aftermath of World War I. Officially, the UER called for participation in parliamentary elections on the lists of Romanian parties, a viewpoint not shared by the entire community. Jewish candidates did not run on separate lists in the 1919 elections, but for the 1920 election, a number of Jewish political coalitions appeared, of which the most important was the Jewish Bloc (Blocul Evreiesc), which ran candidates in ten Counties of Romania and won no seats. At the 1922 election, a single faction, the Jewish Nationalist Group (Grupul Evreiesc Naţionalist), ran but did not achieve notable successes. At the same time, a significant number of Jews entered Parliament, being elected on the lists of other parties, especially those of the Romanian National Party and the Peasants' Party.

At its 1929 congress, which brought together representatives of all Romanian Jews, the UER adopted a new statute, which specified that the UER fought to "defend the individual and collective rights of the Jewish population of Romania which proceed from the Constitution and the laws of the country, as well as from international treaties". The UER maintained its tactical orientation, refusing to collaborate with those organisations that wished to found a national Jewish party. An intensification of internal political conflicts led to the formation of the Jewish Party (PER) in 1931.

After 1933, part of the Jewish population entered the PER while others joined the Social Democrats and other parties, diminishing the UER's authority. Nevertheless it continued its activity of raising cultural standards among the Jewish masses, placing particular emphasis on emancipation and equality through integration. The intensification of extreme-right activity led the UER to accept collaboration with the PER, so that in 1936, the Central Council of Romanian Jews (Consiliul Central al Evreilor din România) was founded with the purpose of uniting all Jewish political forces against right-wing extremism.

After all extant Romanian political parties were dissolved on March 30, 1938, the UER continued to undertake limited activities. After World War II, the UER was reactivated, enjoying the support of the Jewish Democratic Committee (Comitetul Democratic Evreiesc, CDE). Together with the CDE and the Workers' Zionist-Socialist Ihud Party (Partidul Muncitoresc Sionist-Socialist “Ihud"), the UER participated in the Working Palestine Bloc (Blocul “Palestina Muncitoare"), which prepared, in a professional way, Jews who wished to emigrate to Palestine. It ceased its activity during 1946.

== Notable members ==
- Adolphe Stern (president, 1909-1919)
- Wilhelm Filderman (president, 1919-1938)
- Benno Straucher
- Iacob Catz
- Horia Carp
- Gabriel Schaffer
