= Mayer Ebner =

Romanian politician (1872–1955)

Mayer (Meir) Ebner
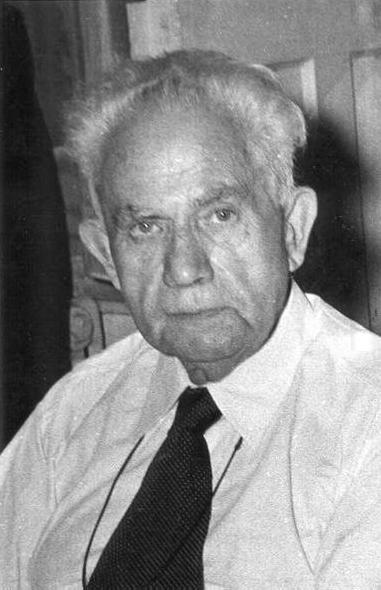
- Mayer (Meir) Ebner
- Born: 19 September 1872; Czernowitz, Bukovina, Austria-Hungary (now Chernivtsi, Ukraine)
- Died: 12 December 1955 (aged 83); Tel Aviv, Israel
- Occupations: Lawyer, journalist, Zionist leader

Mayer (Meir) Ebner (19 September 1872 – 12 December 1955) was a Zionist leader, journalist and lawyer from Bukovina. He served as chairman of the Zionist Organization in Bukovina during the interwar period and was one of the leading figures of the Zionist movement in Romania. Ebner was a member of the Romanian Chamber of Deputies and the Senate, serving four terms in the Parliament of Romania. He was also head of the Jewish community of Czernowitz, chairman of the Jewish National Council and chairman of the Jewish National Party. In 1940 he immigrated to Mandatory Palestine.

== Early life ==
Ebner was born in Czernowitz in the Duchy of Bukovina, then part of the Austro-Hungarian Empire. He was the son of Jacob and Malka Ebner (née Frankel). He received a traditional Jewish education and later attended a general gymnasium in Czernowitz.

He studied law at Czernowitz University, where he earned a doctorate in law, and subsequently practiced as a lawyer alongside his political activity.

== Zionist activity ==
In 1891 Ebner helped establish the Zionist student association Hasmonea in Czernowitz together with Isaac Shmirer, Joseph Birer, Shlomo Kassner and Philipp Menczel. Modeled in part on the Viennese Kadimah, Hasmonea was among the first Jewish-national student fraternities in Austria-Hungary and sought to promote a distinct Jewish national identity in opposition to assimilation into German culture.

At the First Zionist Congress in Basel in 1897, Bukovina was represented by Mayer Ebner, Isaac Shmirer and Leon Picker. Ebner delivered a speech concerning the situation of the Jews of Bukovina. In a later interview, Ebner recalled a meeting with Theodor Herzl in Vienna following the congress, in which Ebner expressed disappointment with its immediate results. Herzl reportedly replied: "You Jews have waited two thousand years, and you cannot wait another two years."

Ebner later developed what he described as a "realistic national policy", which he also termed Jüdische Realpolitik ("Jewish Realpolitik"), advocating Jewish political representation and the defense of Jewish minority rights in European states, alongside support for the establishment of a Jewish national home in Palestine. He subsequently elaborated this dual approach in terms of Landespolitik, emphasizing that organized Jewish political activity in the Diaspora and the defense of Jewish minority rights within European states were likewise an indispensable part of Zionism.

== Political activity in Romania ==
After World War I, Bukovina was incorporated into Romania. Ebner continued his Zionist and political activity and became chairman of the Zionist Organization in Bukovina.

He founded and edited the German-language Zionist newspaper Ostjüdische Zeitung, which appeared from 1919 until it was closed by the antisemitic Goga–Cuza government in 1937. The newspaper served as one of the main Zionist political platforms in Bukovina during the interwar period. On 12 December 1927, Ebner took part in a meeting with Dr. Chaim Weizmann in Chernivtsi, during Weizmann’s visit to Bukovina and his meeting with the leadership of the local Zionist movement. Ebner later published his impressions of the visit in a comprehensive portrait article on Weizmann titled “Chaim Weizmann. Ein Porträt”.

In 1926, Ebner was elected to the Chamber of Deputies of the Parliament of Romania. In the same year, following the antisemitic murder of the Jewish student David Falik in Czernowitz, he addressed the Romanian Parliament, condemning the incident and stating that antisemitic agitation was taking place with the tacit consent of the authorities. In 1928 he was elected to the Romanian Senate. He was a member of the Jewish Party (Romanian: Partidul Evreiesc din România, PER), a Jewish political party active in Romania during the interwar period. Ebner served as leader of the Jewish parliamentary group in the Romanian parliament, coordinating the political activity of Jewish representatives, and representing Jewish political interests.

In 1933 he was elected vice president of the Congress of European Nationalities in Geneva following the death of Leo Motzkin.

== Immigration to Palestine ==
In 1940 Ebner immigrated to Mandatory Palestine and settled in Tel Aviv. He continued to participate in Zionist public life and remained a member of the Zionist Executive.

In 1948 he attended the ceremony of the Israeli Declaration of Independence. In a later interview, Ebner recalled his reaction to the establishment of the state, saying: "I did not believe that I would live to see the Jewish state with my own eyes, although I had always been certain that such a great event must come."

He contributed articles to Hebrew newspapers such as Haaretz and Davar, reflecting on Jewish political strategy, Zionism, and European developments.

Ebner died on 12 December 1955 and was buried in Nahalat Yitzhak Cemetery in Tel Aviv.

== Selected works ==
- "Jüdische Realpolitik". Die Welt (Vienna), 22 February 1901, no. 8, pp. 6–7. PDF
- "Zionismus und Landespolitik", Ostjüdische Zeitung (Chernivtsi), 9 December 1921.
- "Chaim Weizmann. Ein Porträt", Ostjüdische Zeitung (Chernivtsi), 18 December 1927.
- "After the Meeting of the Zionist Executive (Impressions)", Davar, 29 April 1948. (Hebrew)
- "From First-Hand Accounts: A Conversation with Dr. Mayer Ebner", Davar, 3 February 1950. (Hebrew)
