= Wilhelm Filderman =

Romanian-Jewish lawyer and politician

- Born: Wilhelm Filderman; November 14, 1882; Bucharest, Kingdom of Romania
- Died: November 14, 1963 (aged 81); Paris, France (in exile)
- Other name: Fieldermann
- Citizenship: Romanian
- Education: University of Paris (Doctor of Law, 1909)
- Occupations: Lawyer, Politician
- Organization(s): Union of Romanian Jews; Federation of Jewish Communities
- Known for: Leader of the Romanian-Jewish community (1919–1947); Advocacy for Jewish civil rights; Intervening with Ion Antonescu to prevent deportations during The Holocaust.
- Office: Member of the Chamber of Deputies
- Political party: National Liberal Party

Wilhelm Filderman (last name also spelled Fieldermann; 14 November 1882 – 1963) was a lawyer and the leader of the Romanian-Jewish community between 1919 and 1947; in addition, he was a representative of the Jews in the Romanian parliament.

== Early life ==
Filderman was born in Bucharest, the capital of Romania, in 1882. He became a Doctor of Law in Paris, France, in 1909.

== Career ==
After returning to Romania and teaching for two years at the high school of the Jewish community of Bucharest, Filderman began practicing law in 1912. Filderman was elected to the central committee of the Union of Romanian Jews in 1913, becoming the active leader of this organization after World War I. During World War I, Filderman was an officer in the Romanian Army, and after World War I ended, he represented the Union of Native-Born Jews at the Paris Peace Conference, where he declared that the total emancipation of the Jews was an inalienable right and where he made an impact on the final draft of the Romanian Minorities Treaty. Filderman became the representative of the American Jewish Joint Distribution Committee (JDC) in Romania in 1920, and he was elected president of the Union of Romanian Jews three years later, in 1923. Filderman was elected a member of the Romanian parliament on the Liberal Party list in 1927, and in addition, he was the president of the Jewish community of Bucharest between 1931 and 1933. During the early 1930s, Filderman also became president of the Federation of Jewish Communities, an organization which took over the functions of the political representation of the Romanian Jews after all political parties in Romania were dissolved in 1937. Between the world wars, Filderman engaged in combating anti-Semitism (including publishing several books against anti-Semitism) and in favor of civil rights and full citizenship for Romanian Jews. In addition, Filderman also campaigned on the behalf of Jewish refugees who fled to Romania in response to pogroms and/or the fear of ending up under Nazi rule. As a former classmate of Marshal Ion Antonescu, the leader (Conducător) of Romania between 1940 and 1944, Filderman was partly responsible for indefinitely suspending plans to deport the Jews in the Romanian Old Kingdom and Southern Transylvania to Nazi death camps in Poland; in turn, this led to the majority of the Jews in Romania surviving World War II and The Holocaust. In addition, Filderman did whatever he could to save the lives of the Jews of Bessarabia and Bukovina, though unfortunately, unlike his other efforts, these efforts of Filderman's were largely unsuccessful. In 1943, Filderman publicly stated his opposition to the additional taxation of the Romanian Jews, and was subsequently deported by Antonescu to Transnistria, being released after three months due to the intervention of the Papal nuncio and the Swiss and Swedish ambassadors.

== Later life ==
After the Soviet Army conquered Romania in 1944, Filderman led the struggle to reclaim Jewish property and again became the president of the Federation of Communities and of the Union of Romanian Jews and representative of the JDC. Filderman succeeded in preventing Jewish youth from being conscripted into the notoriously anti-Semitic Romanian Army. During this time, Filderman came into conflict with the Jewish Communists due to his refusal to support the Romanian Communist Party or to join the affiliated Jewish Democratic Committee; as a result of the instigation of these Communists, Filderman was arrested in 1945 and only released after a five-day hunger strike. Afterwards, Filderman spent three weeks under house arrest, and in addition, he became increasingly vilified and intimidated by the Communist Romanian authorities and by Romanian-Jewish Communists. In January 1948, Filderman secretly fled from Romania to Paris, France after he was told that he would once again be arrested, this time on charges of being a British spy. Filderman continued to live in Paris until his death in 1963 at the age of 80 or 81. After Filderman's death, his archives were transferred to Yad Vashem due to this desire being expressed in his will.
