= Strecker =

Strecker is a German surname. Notable people with the surname include:

- Adolph Strecker (1822–1871), German chemist who worked with amino acids
- Herman Strecker (1836–1901), American entomologist specialising in butterflies and moths
- Heinrich Strecker (1893–1981), Austrian composer of operettas and popular Viennese music
- Ignatius Jerome Strecker (1917–2003), American prelate of the Roman Catholic Church
- Karl Strecker (1884–1973), German general
- Karl Strecker (engineer) (1858-1934), German electrical engineer specializing in telegraphy
- Karl Strecker (philologist) (1861-1945), German philologist specializing in Medieval Latin
- Ludwig Strecker (1853–1943), owner of London music publisher Schott and Co., Limited
- Ludwig Strecker Jr. (1883–1978), music publisher and librettist
- Rainer Strecker (born 1965), German actor
- Tania Strecker, Danish model and television presenter in the UK

== Other uses ==
- Strecker amino acid synthesis, synthesize an amino acid from an aldehyde or ketone
- Strecker degradation, converts an α-amino acid into an aldehyde by an imine intermediate
- Strecker's chorus frog, a species of nocturnal tree frog native to the south central United States

== See also ==
- Strick
- Stricker
- Strack
- Struck
- Strucker
