= Benno Straucher =

Romanian politician

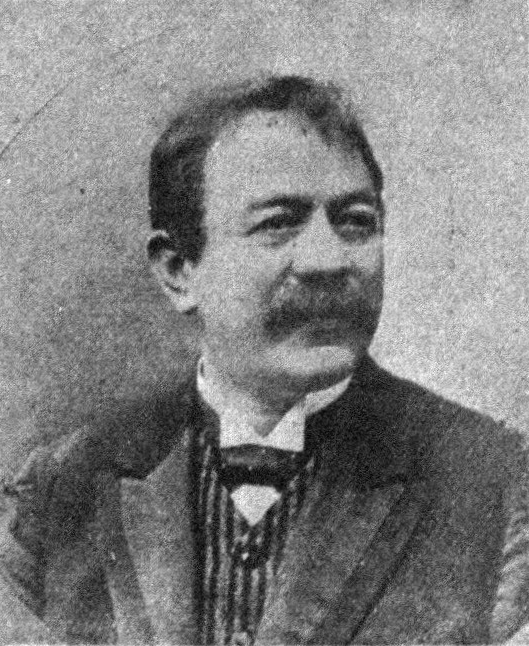
- Straucher, photographed in or before 1907

Reichsabgeordneter
- In office 1897–1919
- Constituency: Czernowitz

Member of the Chamber of Deputies of Romania
- In office May 27, 1920 – June 1926
- Constituency: Czernowitz ("Cernăuți-city")
- In office June 14, 1927 – June 1931

Personal details
- Born: August 11, 1850/1854 Rohozna, Duchy of Bukovina
- Died: November 5, 1940 (aged 86/90) Chernivtsi (Czernowitz, Cernăuți), Ukrainian SSR
- Party: Independent (1882–1904, 1918–1940); Progressive Peasants' Fellowship (1904); Jewish National People's Party (1906–1918)
- Other political affiliations: People's Party (1920–1922); Democratic Union Party (1922); National Liberal Party (1922–1932); Union of Romanian Jews (1923–1940)
- Profession: Lawyer, journalist

Benno or Beno (Binyamin) Straucher (Yiddish: בענאָ שטרױכער; Ukrainian: Бенно Штраухер; August 11, 1850/1854 – November 5, 1940) was a Bukovina-born Austro-Hungarian lawyer, politician and Jewish community representative, who spent the final part of his career in Romania. A Jewish nationalist influenced by classical liberalism and Zionism, he first held political offices in Czernowitz city. After 1897, he was one of the noted Jewish representatives in the Austrian Parliament's upper chamber (Abgeordnetenhaus). Straucher, who was instrumental in creating the reformist Progressive Peasants' Fellowship, maintained his Abgeordnetenhaus seat throughout the remainder of Austria-Hungary's existence. From 1906, he led the Jewish National People's Party locally and helped establish the pan-Austrian Jewish National Party. He vied for political direction over the Bukovina Jews with several other groups, most notably the Zionist People's Council Party of Mayer Ebner, who became his personal rival.

Straucher supported maintaining tight connections between Jews and Bukovina Germans while endorsing a personal version of Jewish autonomism and Yiddishism. He was a Habsburg loyalist up to the final stages of World War I, and then supported Bukovina's attachment to a "German Austria", then to the West Ukrainian People's Republic. Upon the region's incorporation into Greater Romania, he began cooperating with the larger Union of Romanian Jews. Forming successive alliances with the People's Party and the National Liberal Party, he also served two non-consecutive terms in the Romanian Chamber of Deputies. Despite such moves, and although he endorsed a version of Jewish assimilation, Straucher made himself known as a strong critic of Romanianization measures.

== Biography ==
=== Early career and 1897 election victory ===
Born in 1854 (according to other sources: 1850) in the village of Rohozna near Sadagóra (later incorporated into Czernowitz, now in Ukraine), the stepson of a merchant, Straucher graduated from the Czernowitz Gymnasium. He studied law at Vienna University, took his doctorate from Czernowitz Law School in 1880, and became a practicing attorney (for a while, public prosecutor). Straucher, who made himself known for supporting social policies, was elected leader of the local Kehilla in 1882 and, in 1884, deputy to the Czernowitz local council (Stadtrat or Gemeinderat). Although he became involved in Jewish nationalist circles, Straucher remained an independent populist, who could rally the "majority Orthodox proletariat" in political actions against the city's more assimilated Jewish elites.

From early on, Straucher campaigned intensely for the Austrian authorities to recognize a separate Jewish community in the entire Duchy of Bukovina, as part of a process to grant all ethnic groups proportional representation. Their request was supported by Yulian Romanchuk, a representative of the Ruthenians (Ukrainians) in Galicia (the Kingdom of Galicia and Lodomeria), whose participation in the move followed a tradition of collaboration between Ukrainian and Jewish activists. Straucher also tightened his contacts with the region's large ethnic Romanian community: as early as 1883, he spoke at a cultural meeting of Societatea Academică Junimea, a student club, offering his praise to the Romanian Orthodox clergy.

On November 15, 1877, the Governor of Bukovina, Baron Girolamo de Alesani, ordered the arrest of the leaders of the Arboroasa student society (including Ciprian Porumbescu) on charges of Romanian irredentism; the arrest was carried out by investigating magistrate Benno Straucher. The jury, led by Baron Alexandru Wassilko de Serecki and influenced by assessor Leon de Goian, unanimously decided to acquit the defendants. However, the unsanitary conditions in prison caused Ciprian Porumbescu to contract tuberculosis, leading to the talented composer's death at only 29 years of age.

Presenting himself in the legislative election of 1897, Straucher became a member of the Abgeordnetenhaus, which represented the Duchy as part of Cisleithania. Straucher, who was reelected with a large margin during the next race, kept this office for the following decades, throughout World War I and down the end of the Habsburg monarchy. In 1907, following the introduction of universal male suffrage, Straucher was one of four deputies for the early Jewish National Party to be elected that year, alongside Heinrich Gabel, Arthur Mahler and Adolf Stand (all of whom were elected in Galicia). American historian Joshua Shanes, who researched the political climate at the time of the election, noted that the result was "not so grand", since the list had also endorsed 19 other candidates throughout Cisleithania. As parliamentarian, he did not rally with organized factions, but was briefly member of a "Jewish Club", formed by representatives in Vienna.

In this context, Straucher represented the movement identifying itself with German-speaking Europe and Austro–German liberalism, favoring secularism and the preservation of rule from Vienna. One of statements called Bukovina Jews "followers of the gigantic German culture". According to historians Michael John and Albert Lichtblau: "Since [...] there was no traditionally established, non-German elite to speak of in Bukovina and the hegemonial powers of German-Austrian domination in the areas of education and administration still played a leading role, the Jews of Bukovina oriented themselves in this direction. The positions of power of the two large national groups, the Romanians and the Ruthenians, were still too weak to cause a shift in this orientation on the part of the Jews. In their situation as a people living in a Diaspora, the Jews were forced to rely on the protection of the hegemonial powers and this seemed, as before, to emanate from Vienna."

However, according to historian William O. McCagg, the "inimitable character" Straucher was elected on this anti-assimilationist platform: a critic of Zionism, he linked Jewish nationhood to a Central European homeland. As McCagg notes, his public was still "the 'little man' who was overlooked by the elegant elders of the Jewish community"—an outlook he also attributes to the Galician supporters of Jewish autonomism, as well as to the Transleithanian Vilmos Vázsonyi. He also believes that Straucher's role was similar to that of assimilationist Josef Samuel Bloch (editor of the Oesterreichische Wochenschrift), who insisted that Jews had to prove themselves to be modern Austrian citizens.

=== Anti-antisemitism ===
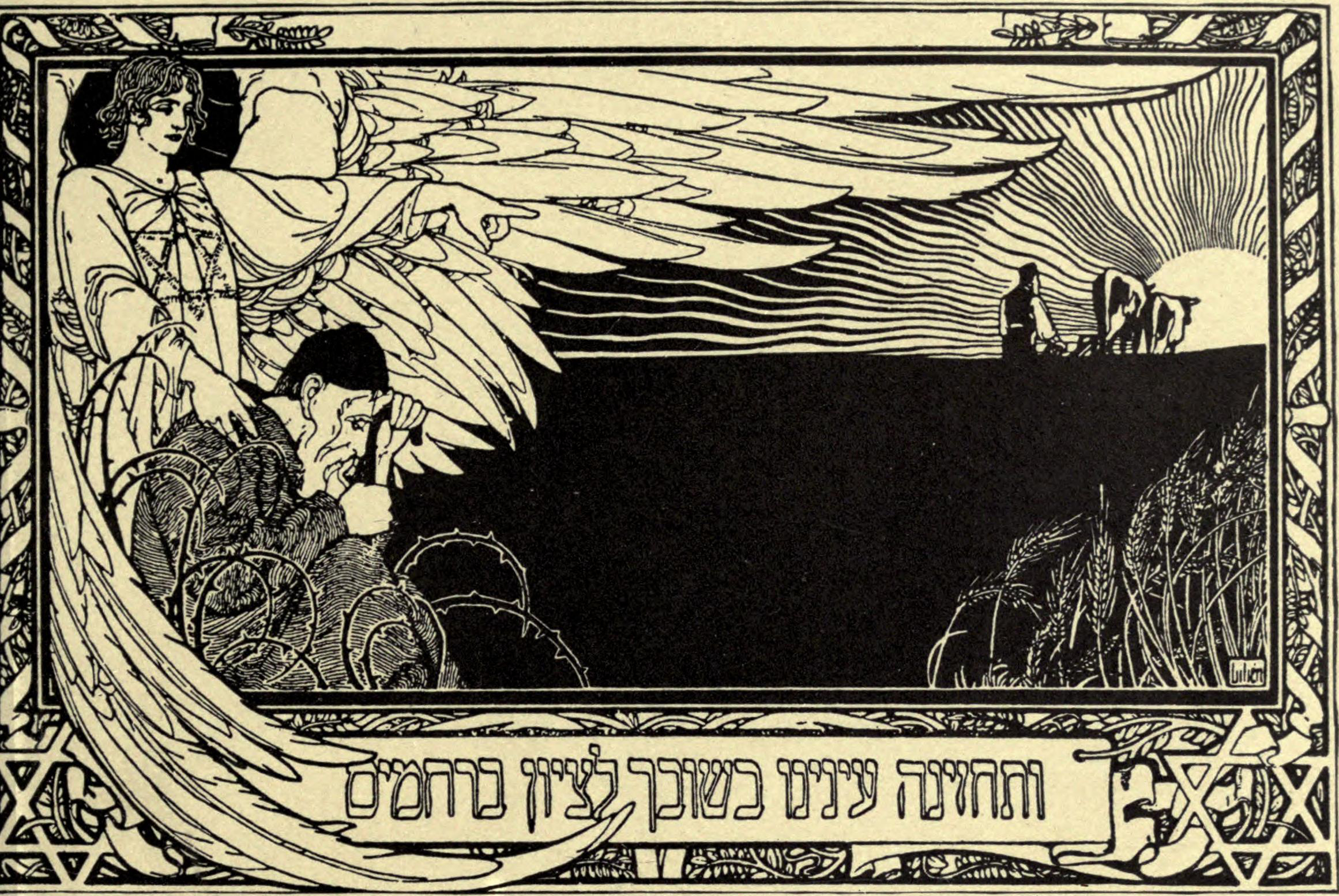
Engraving by the Austrian Jewish artist Ephraim Moses Lilien, released as propaganda for the 5th World Zionist Congress (1901). The caption reads: May our eyes behold your return in mercy to Zion

For all his electoral disputes with official Zionism, Straucher's ideas were largely compatible with those of his rivals: the shared focus was on fostering "identity, self-confidence and pride"; and, although Zionism campaigned for a Jewish return to the Land of Israel, very few Bukovinian Jews actually made the trip. According to Lichtblau and John, Straucher came to stand for "an unusual mixture of German Liberalism and Jewish Nationalism—a sort of half-hearted Zionism."

By the 1890s, the Jewish leader, whom Lichtblau and John designate "the most important political representative of the Jews of Bukovina", decided to end cooperation between local Jews and ethnic Germans, and concentrated on advancing the interests of his community—a gesture which broke with the tradition of Jewish politicians such as Josef Fechner representing a common German-Jewish vote. Another significant part of Benno Straucher's pre-1918 political activity was dedicated to combating antisemitism: himself exposed to antisemitic allegations voiced by his colleagues in parliament, Straucher was among those who dismissed blood libel claims made during the Hilsner Affair of 1899. He gave similar speeches about the growing threat of pogroms on the Austrian border, in the Russian Empire and the Kingdom of Romania.

According to Lichtblau and John, the rise of antisemitism among Austrian German communities was a contributing factor to the rift between German and Jewish liberalism in Bukovina: "Naturally, those secular Jews—whose acculturation had been a modern one, for whom religion and tradition retained little significance and for whom German [culture] had assumed almost mythological stature as a substitute for the traditional culture they had given up—were shocked by the rise of German Nationalist anti-Semitism in the western provinces of the Monarchy, since it endangered their perspective of their own identity." Antisemitism was more latent in other local communities, but exacerbated in Bukovina German quarters. German-Jewish tensions first surfaced in the early 1890s, when German students adopted religious antisemitism, setting up the Society of Christian Germans in Bukovina (also joined by parliamentarians Arthur Skedl and Michael Kipper).

In reaction, young Jewish activists such as Mayer Ebner embraced Zionism. Their clubs were thereafter divided between those who supported immediate emigration (Aliyah) or still invested energy into creating a Bukovina Zionist party. In this context, Ebner reluctantly endorsed Straucher, and, in 1904, founded with him a pan-nationalist group called Jüdischer Volksverein ("Jewish People's Union"). According to McCagg, Straucher's was by then "a vaguely Zionist platform". Other academics agree: Jess Olson describes Straucher as "the Zionist Reichsabgeordneter [Member of Parliament]"; Emanuel S. Goldmith calls him "the only nationally inclined Jewish representative" in the Viennese Parliament.

Lichtblau and John illustrate the split between the German and Jewish communities with a sample from one of Straucher's parliamentary speeches, which reads: "Why [...] are the Germans engaged in an economic and political war against the Jews? I as well have been raised and educated only as a German. Why am I inferior? [...] [In stating we are Jews and not Germans,] we are drawing the obvious conclusion! And nevertheless we remain friends of the German people because we are admirers of the prodigious German culture. We as a people want to be loyal friends of the German people and of other peoples, if and to the extent that they acknowledge our equal rights and equal worth!" Straucher also reacted against the claims of Viennese politicians that Bukovina was destitute and "semi-asiatic", deeming them "most unfair". His other statements of the time are proof of Austrian patriotism, loyalism and reverence for Habsburg Emperor Franz Joseph I.

=== Freisinnige Verband and Progressive Peasants' Fellowship ===
In 1900, Straucher was also elected to the Diet of Bukovina, and kept his seat to 1918. He was also trusted with directorial positions by the Bukovina savings bank, the Chamber of Commerce, Czernowitz Brewery, and, from 1905, the regional School Board. After years of playing the populist leader, he began courting the political and economic regional elite: the Jewish community was much represented among investors in the city's industry and, according to Straucher's own estimate, provided some 75% of the tax income in Czernowitz and almost 50% in all of Bukovina. After 1903, he was confirmed as president of the Czernowitz Kultusgemeinde (the Kehilla's representative body), and the following year came to preside over the Czernowitz city council, where his followers controlled 20 out of 50 seats (giving him a decisive say in the election of a Czernowitz mayor). As a result, Czernowitz twice elected Jewish mayors, and was possibly the only "Austrian capital" to have done so.

Also in 1903, Straucher built on his friendship with intellectuals from Bukovina's other main communities, the Romanian Aurel Onciul, of the Democratic Peasants' Party, and the Ukrainian Nikolai von Wassilko. The three of them set up a Freisinnige Verband ("Freethinkers' Alliance", as in Germany's Freisinnige Partei), noted for condemning the spread of antisemitism. The unifying idea of this Verband was electoral reform, that is the attempt to reduce the number of seats allocated to boyars and reassign them according to Straucher's own system; all nationalities involved in the project agreed to follow their respective agenda to a greater emancipation. More likely to interpret political events as evidence of class conflict rather than national emancipation, the Verband notably criticized the regional conservative groups (who generally sought to stump Bukovina's devolution) and the newly founded Romanian National People's Party (PPNR) of boyar Iancu Flondor (whose platform was linked to the Romanian national revival).

Onciul, convinced that more reforms were going to benefit his fellow Romanians, negotiated separately with Flondor, hoping to create unified district committees for the Romanian factions, and even a "Unitary Romanian Party". The conflict between the Freisinnigen Verband and Flondor escalated when the latter used his position in the Diet to reject Straucher's proposal for electoral reform. It peaked when democrats accused Flondor of supporting antisemitism, alleging that he was the anonymous author of some virulently anti-Jewish articles in Bukowinaer Journal. The matter was investigated by a special Diet commission, who found in favor of Flondor, and who reported that the Bukowinaer Journal editor Max Reiner had been paid 1,000 Kronen to incriminate the PPNR leader. The attempt to defame Flondor, attributed by some to Onciul and Straucher's frustration over Flondor's "anti-democratic" stance, became known locally as Die Flondor Affair ("The Flondor Affair"). Reportedly, Straucher was personally involved in the frame-up, speaking in the Diet against Flondor and his family, and accusing Flondor of having intrigued against his PPNR colleague Gheorghe Popovici.

For a while, Benno Straucher was involved with a new union formed by the 1903 "Freethinkers", which was to facilitate the adoption of radical reforms. Called the Progressive Peasants' Fellowship, it was presided over by him and Onciul, together with Skedl, Georg Graf Wassilko von Serecki and "Young Ukrainian" Stepan Smal-Stotskyi, taking the majority vote in 1904 elections for the Diet (when Georg Wassilko became Landeshauptmann). The Fellowship tacitly approved Straucher's goal of a separate Jewish communal representation, and poured it into legislation proposals.

=== Jewish National People's Party creation and Yiddishist Conference ===
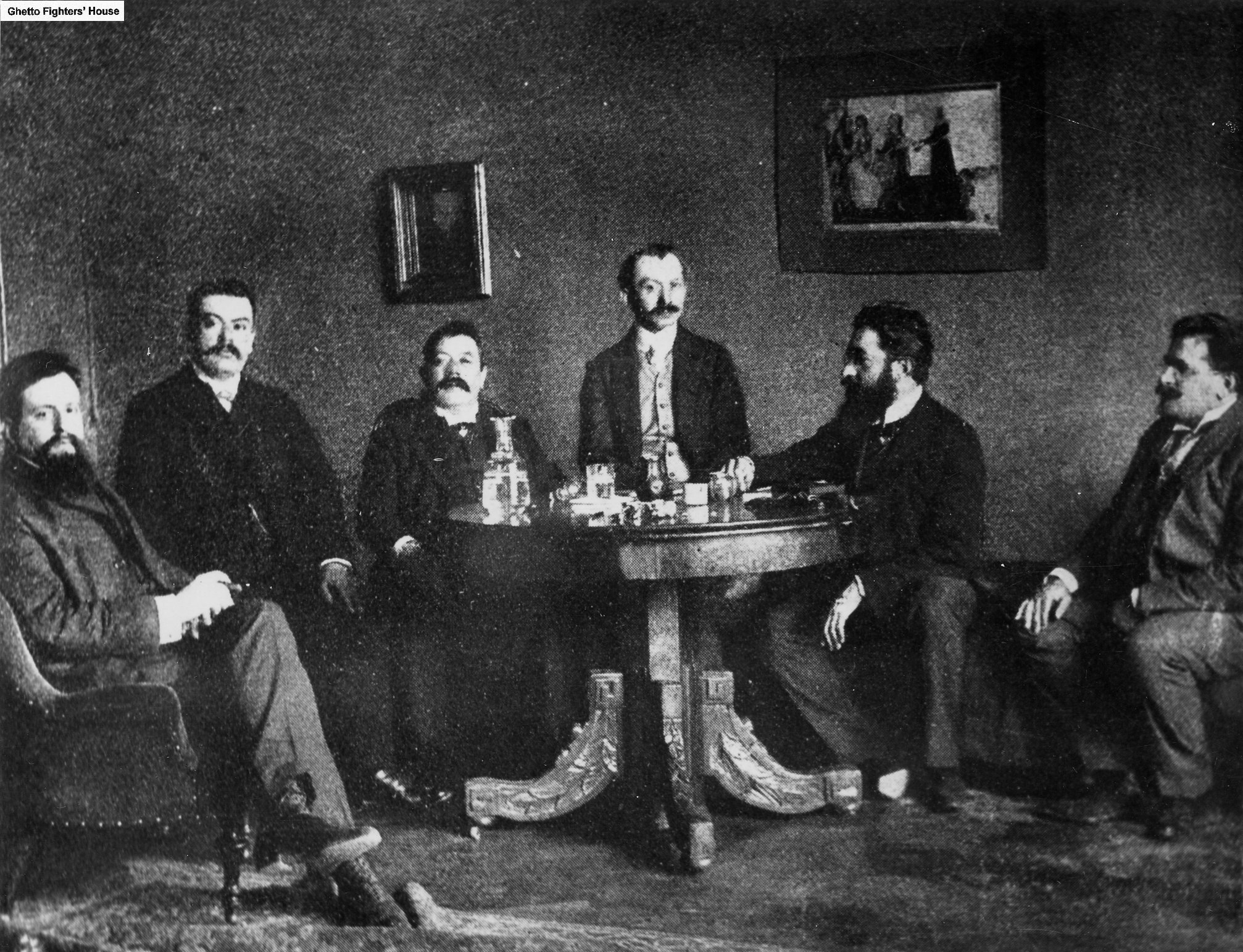
Members of the Jewish National Party in the Austrian Parliament (1907-1911), from left to right: J. Schalit, Adolf Stand, Benno Straucher, Heinrich Gabel, Arthur Mahler, M. Braude

In 1906, Straucher and lawyer-activist Max Diamant together created Bukovina's Jewish National People's Party. At an imperial level, he joined up with Austrian Zionists to set up a new Jewish National Party, which adopted the "work in the present" ideology of Ze'ev Jabotinsky, that is the focus on autonomy for the more sizable Jewish communities of East-Central Europe. Some of his efforts were dedicated to building the Kehilla-run Jewish House of Culture, a major Art Nouveau palace, decorated with his bust. Allegations about "Jewish" corruption in the Czernowitz local council, targeting Straucher's leadership, resulted in ethnic tensions. During autumn 1910, after the accuser, engineer Woitechowski, was called to order by Straucher, the city's Christians organized vigils and strikes.

By that moment, Straucher's option in favor of Jewish secularism and modernization possibly became a reevaluation of Yiddish as a national Jewish language. Reportedly, his advocacy of both autonomy and Yiddishist identity was largely shaped by the "Folkist" ideology of Jewish groups in the Russian Empire. The Yiddishist view, which placed him among the first Jewish intellectuals to identify with what had been hitherto viewed as a regional dialect of German (reportedly, Straucher himself had earlier designated Yiddish as merely a "jargon"), brought him into conflict with Jewish traditionalists, who supported instead a Hebrew revival. However, Straucher did not support education in Yiddish, and favored German-language schools, for which he demanded special Jewish inspectors and teachers.

Notably, Straucher received support from Yiddishist scholar Nathan Birnbaum, who spoke in his favor at Jewish National Party caucuses during the 1907 Austrian elections. Together with Diamant and Birnbaum, Straucher organized the first Conference for the Yiddish Language, held in Czernowitz between August 31 and September 3, 1908. The initial demand was for the proceedings to be held at the Jewish House, but the Conference was ultimately hosted by a similar institution of the local Ukrainians and the local Music Society. The reason for this failure is disputed: some attribute it to opposition from the "Hebraist" adversaries, others suggest that Straucher was in reality unconvinced about the Conference platform, sabotaging his own Yiddishist campaign.

The Conference also marked an early confrontation between the liberal mainstream, into which Straucher had been received, and the modern leftist side of Jewish nationalism: Bundistn groups. According to the Bundistn, Yiddish should have been declared not just "a" Jewish national language, but rather the sole language of Jewishness.

=== "Bukovina Settlement" and 1911 election ===
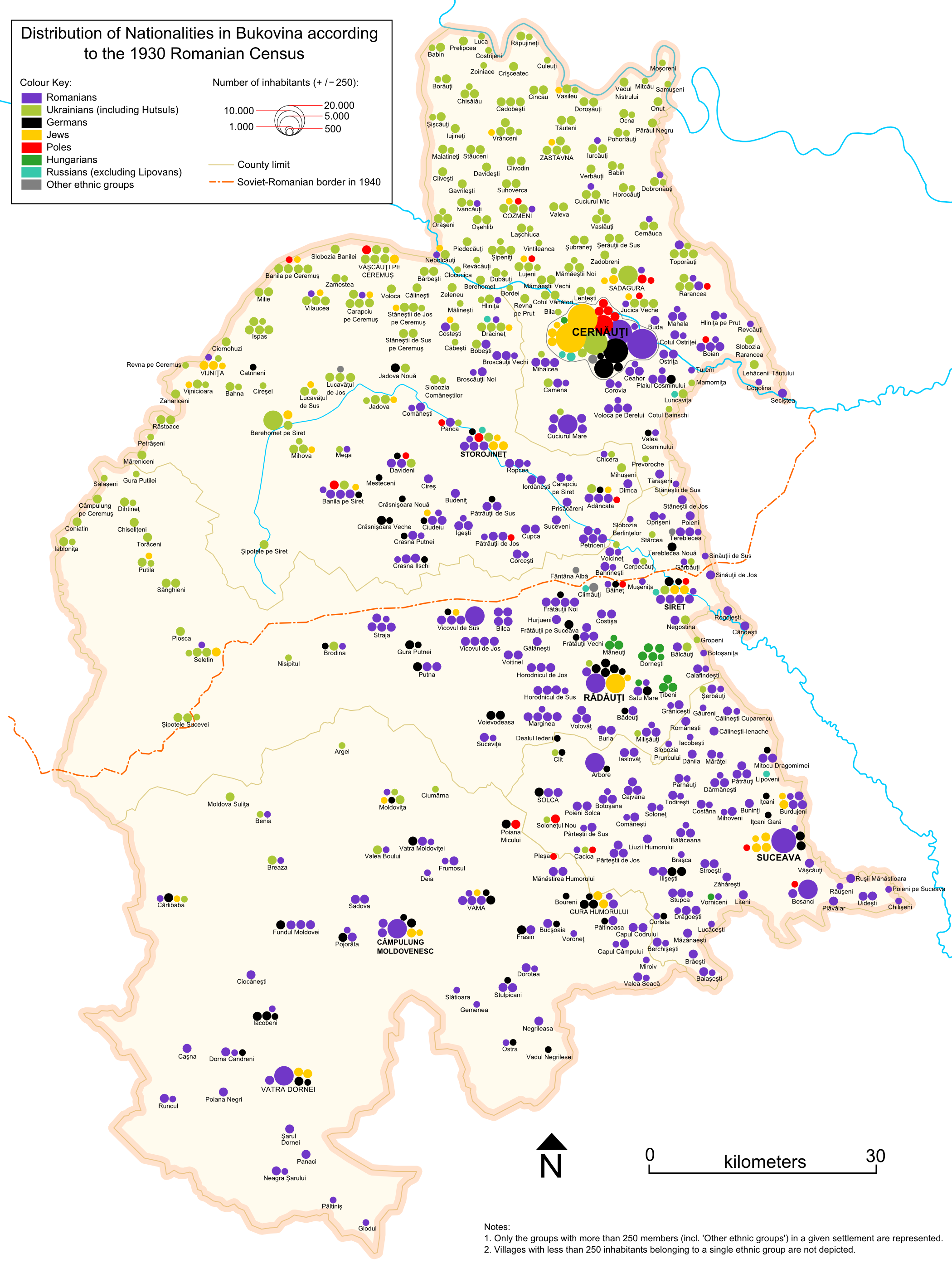
Ethnic map of Bukovina in 1930 (Jews in yellow)

Largely as a result of political restructuring at a provincial level, the Austrian authorities granted the "Bukovina Settlement" in stages between 1909 and 1911. This followed an agreement between the three ethnic groups: the Romanians (represented by Onciul and Alexandru Hurmuzaki), the Ukrainians (Georg Wassilko) and the Jews (Straucher himself), who subsequently negotiated the matter with Oktavian Freiherr Regner von Bleyleben, Bukovina's Governor.

Cultural historians Amy Colin and Peter Rychlo view it as "one of the most progressive accords between ethnic groups in the Austro-Hungarian Empire", and argue: "Growing ethnic tensions necessitated such a treaty to protect peace in Bukovina by insuring ethnic autonomy in political decisions [...]. The fruitful cooperation [...] proved that peaceful ethnic interaction was still possible [in Bukovina] five years before the outbreak of World War I." The agreement provided for a highly complex electoral reform which provided proportional representation to Bukovinian ethnic groups within the local Diet, but, in accordance with the wishes of mainstream Jews and in an effort to combat antisemitic agitation, did not generally award separate recognition to Jews (apart from a few separate electoral districts, they were included in the same group as Germans). Lichtblau and John argue that, through this measure, the Austrian monarchy marked "the final demarcation point [...] which linked together the Jews of Bukovina and the Germans."

The formal regulation was subverted by other provisions, which, in time, separated the German and the Jewish curiae in all but name. Nevertheless, the failure to acknowledge Jews a separate group disappointed the Jewish National People's Party leadership, and caused Straucher to express his protests in a series of open letters. The 1911 election consecrated a split between Straucher's group and Zionists such as Ebner. They accused Straucher of having set up a dictatorship and of having failed to obtain Jewish representation. They moved on to create the separate People's Council Party. Together, the two competing parties won 10 seats, one more than secretly predicted by the Bienerth-Schmerling cabinet in Vienna.

The liberal group, rallied from 1909 around Straucher's newspaper Die Volkswehr ("People's Defense"), was soon drawn into a fierce competition with socialist Jews, including not just with the Bundistn, but also sympathizers of Poale Zion. The Kultusgemeinde was by then Straucher's prime basis of support in parliamentary elections, and, after the 1911 elections (during which he faced no opposition from Ebner's group), he was the only one among the four of his fellow candidates in the 1907 elections to maintain his seat. Of the latter, Arthur Mahler left the Jewish nationalist movement and returned to his career as an art historian.

=== World War I and the National Jewish Council ===
During World War I, Straucher supported Austria-Hungary's commitment to the Central Powers. Before Bukovina was turned into a battleground (see Brusilov Offensive) he, like other Jewish leaders, expressed hopes that Eastern Front victories against the Russian Empire would signify the effective emancipation of Russian Jews, as well as the end for a threat to Europe's safety. Soon afterward, he participated in a large political debate regarding the creation of a central democratic institution for Austria-Hungary, which was intended as a replica of the American Jewish Congress, a test of Jewish autonomy and an instrument in combating antisemitism. Speaking in 1916, he offered his full support to the initiative, and argued in favor of replacing the various other representative bodies, but the move was opposed by the non-Zionist lobby (who preferred a Kehilla-based structure of shtadlanim).

Straucher subsequently used the Abgeordnetenhaus tribune for condemning the antisemitic violence linked with the various political changes. In spring 1918, soon after Austria signed the Treaty of Brest-Litovsk with the Ukrainian People's Republic, granting it territories claimed by Poles, he expressed alarm that Polish nationalists were attributing the events to the Jews, organizing pogroms and planning the eviction of Jews from Galicia. Straucher, like fellow Jewish nationalists Hermann Kadisch and Robert Stricker, continued to express his support for Habsburg ruler Charles I throughout those years. In 1917, he claimed Jews were "an upholding element [standing] unconditionally and without reservations for Austria"; a year later, he pleaded with the Austrians to stop censoring the Yiddishist press of Galicia. According to social historian Marsha L. Rozenblit, Straucher's loyalism should be contrasted with those of his Jewish political partners in the Czech lands (the Selbstwehr journal group, which was more mindful of the local independence movement).

Straucher was still at the Abgeordnetenhaus during late autumn 1918, as the Austrian monarchy began to crumble. On October 4, he was among the regional delegates to Vienna who voted in favor of keeping Bukovina in union with the central government. On November 15, days after German Austria emerged as a rump state, Straucher proposed a bill comprising the demands of Jewish Austrians. These included the recognition of a separate, united and politically autonomous Jewish ethnicity, education rights, and support for "the creation of a Jewish national homeland in Palestine". According to Rozenblit, his autonomist-democratic call was similar to the agendas of both mainstream Zionists and the Galician Poale Zion. On January 3, 1919, the Zionists reached an agreement with the Jewish deputies, setting up Austria's National Jewish Council, which was supposed to endorse the agenda submitted by Straucher. It sought to represent Jews as a people at the Paris Peace Conference, and negotiated with other local governments over the safety of their Jewish citizens.

At home, the situation was degenerating, as Romanians openly demanded incorporation into the Romanian Kingdom and Ukrainians opted for the Ukrainian People's Republic. These tensions flared into riots, quelled when the Romanian Army entered the region and brought it into Romania (a union internationally sanctioned by the 1919 Treaty of Saint-Germain-en-Laye). In this context, Straucher joined Ebner and the socialist Iacob Pistiner in founding another, regional, National Jewish Council, which stood for the defense of community rights.

The new group's program was generally suspicious of union with Romania, where Jewish emancipation had not yet been enacted, and looked into other political alternatives—for this reason, it was placed under close supervision by the new authorities. Major points of contention were the Council's demand for complete educational autonomy and its request that the wartime Jewish refugees in Bohemia, whom the Romanians regarded as aliens, be readmitted into Bukovina. The Council also clashed with Ion Nistor's nationalist Romanian group, the Democratic Union Party, which, using antisemitic language, spoke about a Jewish danger to the Romanian cause. At the time, other segments of Bukovina's Jewish community began criticizing Straucher for his settlements with Wassilko's Ukrainians, allegedly to the detriment of his own coreligionists.

In early 1919, Benno Straucher sent two memoirs to the British delegation at the Paris Peace Conference calling for the division of Bukovina (the northern part, together with the city of Czernowitz, was to be joined to the West Ukrainian People's Republic, and the southern part remained to Romania, according to the Onciul-Popowicz line). The memoirs were not taken into account, the whole of Bukovina was annexed by Romania.

After the Romanian Prime Minister Alexandru Vaida-Voevod signed the Paris Minority Treaty, Straucher changed his attitude, openly endorsing the Romanian rule in Bukovina in the foreign press.

=== Debut in Romanian politics ===
Shortly after the creation of Greater Romania, the Council boycotted the 1919 general election, thus refusing to send its representatives into the Parliament of Romania. Ebner voiced the mistrust of his coreligionists for the Romanian electoral law, arguing that it was meant to dilute the Jewish vote in that region. This decision was contested by businessman Jakob Hecht, who stood as a Jewish candidate on the same platform as Nistor. Hecht's statements, which gave recognition to an unconditional union, were received with consternation by other Jewish activists, who called him a "traitor". By 1923 however, the entire community leadership had come to accept Romania's rule over the region, and Ebner even claimed that there was never any opposition on its part.

In later years, Benno Straucher stood for a platform advocating the preservation of Jewish rights in Bukovina and throughout the Jewish-Romanian community. In the early 1920s, he and his followers began a close cooperation with Wilhelm Filderman's nationwide Union of Romanian Jews (UER). The UER nevertheless failed in rallying to its cause the other representatives of Jewish nationalism, such as the Zionists following Straucher's old rival Ebner. The UER initially supported the People's Party of Alexandru Averescu (despite signs that the group was sympathetic of antisemitic causes). Standing in for the deceased Hecht, Straucher and Ebner became the Jewish Council bids for the 1920 election, with additional support from the German Council; Straucher ran in the "Cernăuți-city" circumscription, for both Chamber and Senate. At the time, those Jewish voters who did not agree with such maneuvers rallied behind Friedrich Billig, founder of a Jewish Democratic Party. Straucher was the only one elected to the Chamber, effectively on Averescu's ticket.

The entire UER eventually threw its support behind the National Liberal Party: in the 1922 election, alongside Nistor, former leader of the Democratic Union Party, Straucher endorsed the National Liberal platform for Bukovina. His activity in Parliament focused on gathering support for a clear emancipation, as promised by the Treaty of Paris and ultimately passed into the 1923 Constitution of Romania. As noted by researcher Alina Cozma, Straucher did so not just out of Jewish nationalism, but also because he believed in equality before the law as a universal prerequisite. In 1923, and again in 1925, the Romanian antisemitic and (increasingly) fascist youth rebelled against the citizenship law and attacked Jewish students in Cluj and Iași. On both occasions, Straucher insistently urged the governing majority to take special measures against the "shameful disturbances".

In contrast with Straucher, Ebner and his Zionist faction had entered an alliance with Averescu, and, in the 1926 race, the move got Ebner elected to the Chamber. Straucher ran against Ebner's colleagues (Karl Klüger, Henric Streitman), which marked his split with the Bukovina Zionists.

=== Final activities ===
Taking precautions against the Ebner's goal of propagating Zionism through Jewish day schools, Straucher gave his approval to the teaching of Romanian-language classes, and therefore to a measure of assimilation, while preventing Zionists from reforming the curriculum. In this context, he made himself known for protesting the Romanianization policies promoted by the governments in Bucharest, in particular in the educational field. During the mid-1920s, he was in correspondence with National Liberal leader Ion I. C. Brătianu and Filderman, documenting cases in which Bukovinian schools had been "purged" of Jewish teachers and administrators were being dismissed, pensioned or demoted by the Ministry of Education, as well as the state-condoned underfunding of state-run Jewish schools. He contrasted these occurrences with the traditionally elevated status of Jews in Czernowitz (then designated as Cernăuți), whom, he assessed, formed 50% of the city's population and 90% of its taxpayers. At the time, the authorities had restructured the secondary education institutions into five high schools, divided by ethnicity, and Straucher's writings attest a significant reduction in attendance numbers for the Jewish Lycée No. 3. Jewish parents were then opting in favor of sending their children to privately run day schools.

Straucher did not present his candidature in 1926, but his activities were still monitored by antisemitic adversaries, especially after the minority-language students in Bukovina rebelled against the baccalaureate commission. In December 1926, his name was brought up in parliamentary controversy: the antisemitic deputy A. C. Cuza alleged that Ebner was bribing the opposition Peasants' Party, with the goal of reforming legislation, and that, together with Straucher, he was "seizing all the land" in Bukovina. Cuza's refusal to substantiate his claim sparked a lively debate in the Chamber, during which Cuza's associate, Ion Zelea Codreanu, was heard shouting at Ebner: "Anti-Semitism will disappear when you Jews are cleared out of the country!"

Straucher was reelected to Chamber in the 1927 vote. He had extended his agreement with the National Liberals and, remarkably, ran against a bloc of minorities formed nationally around the Magyar Party, the German Party and Zionist organizations. Ebner, also reconfirmed as deputy, subsequently rallied with the National Peasants' Party. Opposing all alliance with the UER, he formed a Jewish parliamentary club of non-UER Jewish nationalist representatives, and defined Filderman's policy of alliances with groups suspect of antisemitism as immoral.

In the 1928 election, with renewed support from Nistor, Straucher retook his parliamentary seat—one of 6 Jewish deputies, including Filderman and Horia Carp. He was still publishing Die Volkswehr as an "organ of the Jewish National People's Party", and still pressuring officials into intervening to curb fascist violence. A revival of Romanian Bundistn activity was taking place at the time, sparked by the campaigns of unionist leader Joseph "Iosif" Kissman. At public meetings, Kissman accused Straucher of being a governmental pawn: "The government [...] allows the community to collect taxes directly from the Jews, even though the government is against cultural autonomy [...], but prevents the community from being political, surely [because] those politics don't agree with the Liberals, but lets Straucher campaign politically for the Liberals."

With additional backing from the National Liberals, Straucher became a Senate candidate in the 1932 election, but did not receive the vote. According to McCagg, his last years were spent in a dispute with younger Yiddishist activists "who felt that one could only get through to the Jewish masses by using Yiddish." In July 1935, the local newspapers wrote about Straucher's wish to emigrate to Mandatory Palestine, but he rennounced the idea, after the calls of the Jews of Cernăuți. In 1939, despite the fact that he was 85 (or 89) years old, he was known for taking long walks in Sadagura, an important Hasidic center. The aging politician died in 1940, one year into World War II, and several months after the Soviet occupation of Northern Bukovina. He lies buried in the modern-style Straucher family crypt, at the Chernivtsi Israelite Cemetery.

=== Commemoration ===
In 2018, a street in Chernivtsi was named after him.
