= History of the Jews in Chernivtsi =

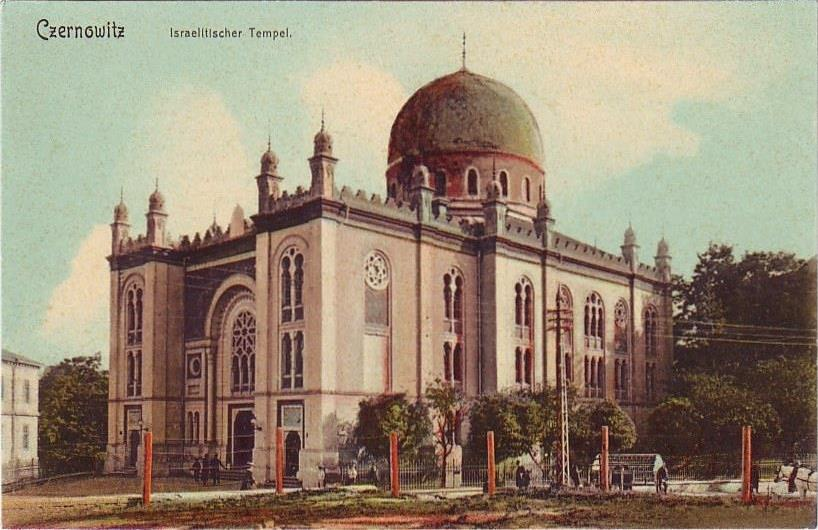
The Choral Synagogue in Chernivtsi

The history of the Jews in Chernivtsi (previously known as Czernowitz or Cernăuți) stretches from the 15th century CE to the present, and forms part of the history of the Jews in Romania and Ukraine. It was the largest Jewish community in Bukovina, in what is now Romania and Ukraine.

== Moldavian era ==
The first documentation of Jews in Chernivtsi (Romanian: Cernăuți) comes from the year 1408, when Alexander I of Moldavia allowed Jews to trade in the city. The principality of Moldavia became a satellite state of the Ottoman Empire ninety years later, and Jewish life in the area underwent many changes. The Jewish population increased substantially during the next two centuries, and primarily spoke Yiddish. The community had some autonomy and was ruled by an elected judge and a rabbi.

== Habsburg era ==
The Habsburg monarchy annexed Chernivtsi in 1774. The new Habsburg rulers imposed many restrictions on the Jews, such as high taxes and bans on marriage and on building new houses. Despite these restrictions, the population still grew. The Habsburgs' aim was to "Germanize" the new area of their empire, and they therefore suppressed the immigration of Galician Jews to Chernivtsi. However, when the Jews of the Habsburg monarchy received emancipation in 1849, their living conditions improved considerably. Some Jews living in the city were elected as mayors and as members of the Imperial Council. The emancipation led the wealthier entrepreneurial Jews to adopt the surrounding German culture. Many started speaking German, while the poorer Jews continued to speak Yiddish. These modernizing liberal reformers elected Eli‘ezer Igel as chief rabbi of the city in 1853, and he served until 1892. Igel's preaching in German, along with other reforms, led to a schism with the Haredi community that lasted from 1872 until 1877, when the disputes were resolved. Hospitals, asylums, schools, and orphanages were built. Eduard Reiss and Salo Weisselberger were elected mayors of the city in the early 20th century. The Czernowitz Conference was held in 1908 to promote the Yiddish language. By 1910, Jews made up over 30% of the population of Chernivtsi, a higher percentage than Ukrainians, Poles, or Romanians alone. During World War I, the city was occupied by the Russian army three times, which caused some Jews to leave.

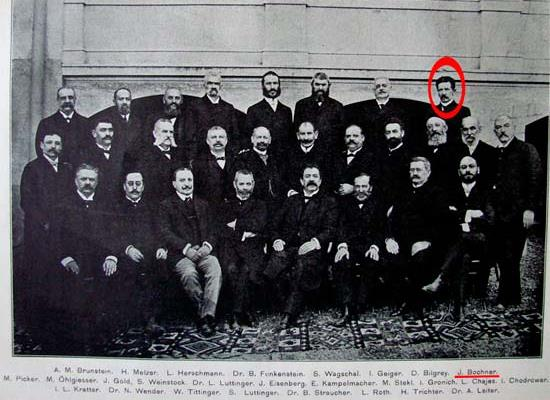
In the front row, fourth from the right, is Benno Straucher, while the encircled one is architect Julius Bochner.

== Interbellum ==
At the end of World War I, Ukrainian forces attempted to take control, but the Kingdom of Romania annexed Chernivtsi. A new policy called "Romanianization" was imposed. Due to that policy, many Jews working in the public service, including schools and universities, were fired. However, the Jewish community continued to flourish. New youth movements and football teams were established, new newspapers were published, and there was also a Hebrew school. Jews from other areas in the region moved to the city. Despite antisemitic sentiment from Romanian nationalists, the Jewish community thrived economically and socially. Jews served in elected office, in associations, in the chamber of commerce, and in the Parliament of Romania.

== World War II and the Holocaust (Including the Deportations to Transnistria) ==
The Soviet Union occupied Chernivtsi in 1940 and immediately began persecuting Zionist activities and wealthy Jews, 3000 of whom were deported to Siberia. According to Dr. Avigdor Schachan, who wrote a book about the Transnistrian ghettos and was himself brought up in the Bessarabian part of the present-day Chernivtsi Oblast of Ukraine, about 2,000 northern Bukovinian and 4,000 Bessarabian Jews were deported by the Soviet authorities to the Soviet east in June 1941. More than 45,000 Jews lived in Chernivtsi in 1941 at the beginning of Operation Barbarossa. The city was retaken on July 5, 1941, by Romania, which had become an ally of Nazi Germany. Wartime leader Ion Antonescu believed the Jews favored the Soviet Union, and repressed them. The chief rabbi was assassinated, the synagogue was burned, and other restrictions were implemented. The Jews of the city, numbering almost 50,000, were then put in a ghetto, and later more than 32,000 were deported to ghettos in the Transnistria Governorate. In October and November 1941, 28,391 Jews from the city were deported to Transnistria. About 1,500 Jews from Chernivtsi converted to Christianity to avoid deportation to Transnistria. A further 4,290 Chernivtsi Jews were deported to Transnistria in June 1942. All the Jews deported from Chernivtsi in 1941 and 1942 were deported by train. Half of the 1941 transports and all of the 1942 ones went to Otaci (then Atachi), directly on the border with Transnistria, from where the deportees crossed into Transnistria. These deportees were typically middle- class people, many of whom were able to take lei and valuables into Transnistria (as were the southern Bukovinian Jews), and they were not beaten or forced to buy food at high prices in a transit camp. The other half, mostly working- class people, were sent to the Marculesti transit camp, where they were often beaten and plundered by Romanian gendarmes and most gave up much of their jewelry and precious metals in exchange for food. From there they walked to nearby Atachi to be sent across the river to Transnistria. According to the Jewish Virtual Library, about 60% of the deportees to Transnistria from the city of Chernivtsi perished. According to Gali Mir-Tibon, most of the Jews deported from the city of Chernivtsi to Transnistria did not survive. The Yad Vashem database lists by name 19,424 Jews who had lived in Chernivtsi before the war and died in the Holocaust. According to the same database, 2,478 Jews who had lived in Chernivtsi before the war were killed in the city during the Holocaust. The number of Jews killed in the city of Chernivtsi itself, regardless of their place of prewar residence, was 3,372 according to the Yad Vashem database, with names included. Most of these Jews were killed by the German Einsatzgruppe D. According to the Einsatzgruppen reports, the SS (Einsatzgruppe D) killed 3,106 Chernivtsi Jews in July and August 1941, and the Romanians killed 400, although survivor testimonies suggest that the number of victims may have been higher. According to Ruth Glasberg, a survivor and eyewitness of the massacre and of the deportations to Transnistria, "thousands of people were killed in the street and in houses by the Germans and Legionaires" (i.e., members and supporters of the fascist Legion of the Archangel Michael). In a July 18, 1941, memorandum to Romania's military dictator Ion Antonescu, the National Peasants' Party leader Iuliu Maniu protested in two paragraphs against the massacres of Bessarabian and northern Bukovinian Jews as well as the Iasi pogrom.

The mayor of Chernivtsi at the time, Traian Popovici, opposed the harsh policy against the Jews. He helped nearly 20,000 Jews escape deportation to Transnistria, claiming they were important for the city's economy and needed for labor. For his actions, Popovici received the title of Righteous Among the Nations. Dorimedont Popovici (see https://ro.wikipedia.org/wiki/Dorimedont_Popovici ), the uncle of Traian Popovici, who was vice-president of the National Council of Bukovina, a member of the Romanian parliament and a cabinet minister, first for the People's Party and later for the National Peasant Party, also intervened with Ion Antonescu through a 74-page memorandum calling for, among other things, an end to the deportations of Jews from Bukovina. There were also other similar interventions. Another major figure who intervened to stop the deportations of Jews to Transnistria was the Metropolitan of Bukovina, Tit Simedrea (see https://ro.wikipedia.org/wiki/Tit_Simedrea), a former supporter of the antisemitic League of National Christian Defense led by A.C. Cuza, as noted in the first major published book on the Holocaust in English, which cites the Chief Rabbi of Romania, Alexandru Safran. Iuliu Maniu, the National Peasants' Party leader, condemned the deportations of Jews to Transnistria and intervened with Ion Antonescu to stop them. About 16,794 of the Jews were allowed to stay in Chernivtsi after the June 1942 deportations. Besides the deportations of Jews to Transnistria in June 1942, Bukovina's governor Corneliu Calotescu reported to Ion Antonescu on August 21, 1942, that 147 Jewish Communists, mainly from the city of Chernivtsi, had been deported to Transnistria; they were not included in the statistics of deported Jews. For more information on the Holocaust in Transnistria, including on the fate of the Jewish deportees from Bukovina, see History of the Jews in Transnistria. For more information on the history of the Jews of Bukovina, including during the Holocaust, see History of the Jews in Bukovina.

On March 14, 1944, Romania's military dictator Ion Antonescu allowed the repatriation of all the Jews deported to Transnistria. After World War II ended, many Jews returning from Transnistria left Chernivtsi in order to live in Israel and other countries. They were replaced by other Jews from all over the Soviet Union.

== Modern era ==
After the collapse of the Soviet Union and Ukrainian independence, Jews continued to leave the city. About 1,400 Jews remained in Chernivtsi by 2001, most of whom were descendants of Jews who immigrated after World War II.

== Demographics ==
Jewish population in Chernivtsi
| Year | Pop. | ±% |
|---|---|---|
| 1774 | 468 | — |
| 1850 | 4,678 | +899.6% |
| 1880 | 14,440 | +208.7% |
| 1910 | 28,610 | +98.1% |
| 1930 | 42,592 | +48.9% |
| 1959 | 37,000 | −13.1% |
| 1989 | 16,469 | −55.5% |
| 2001 | 1,443 | −91.2% |

== Notable people ==
- Moshe Altman (1890–1981), Yiddish writer
- Aharon Appelfeld (1932–2018), Israeli writer
- Rose Auslander (1901–1988), German-speaking poet
- Roman Bronfman (born 1954), Israeli politician
- Josef Burg (writer) (1912–2009), Yiddish writer
- Paul Celan (1920–1970), German-speaking poet
- Juli-Joel Gemstone (born 1958), Israeli politician from the Likud party
- Arthur Kolnik (1890–1972), expressionist graphic artist
- Mila Kunis (born 1983), American actress
- Itzik Manger (1901–1969), Yiddish writer
- Selma Meerbaum-Eisinger (1924–1942), German-speaking poet
- Mordkhe Schaechter (1927–2007), Yiddish linguist, writer, educator, and activist
- Joseph Schmidt (1904–1942), famous opera singer (tenor)
- Elieser Steinbarg (1880–1932), Yiddish writer
- Benno Straucher (1854–1940), politician
- David Vyssoki (born 1948), psychiatrist
- Salomon Wininger (1877-1968), author of the Great Jewish National Biography

== See also ==
- History of the Jews in Bukovina
- Bukovina
- Chernivtsi
- History of the Jews in Brody
- History of the Jews in Kharkiv
- History of the Jews in Kyiv
- History of the Jews in Romania
- History of the Jews in Odesa
- History of the Jews in Transnistria
- History of the Jews in the Ottoman Empire
- History of the Jews in Austria
- History of the Jews in Hungary
- History of the Jews in the Soviet Union
