= Păltinoasa =

- Commune
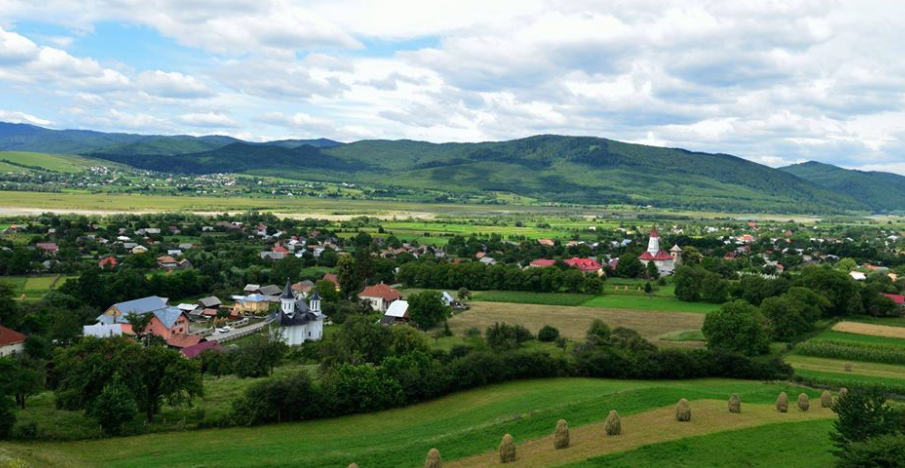
- Rural landscape in Capu Codrului, Păltinoasa

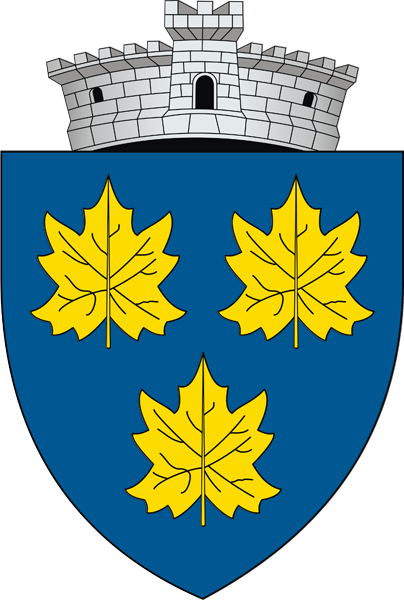
- Coat of arms

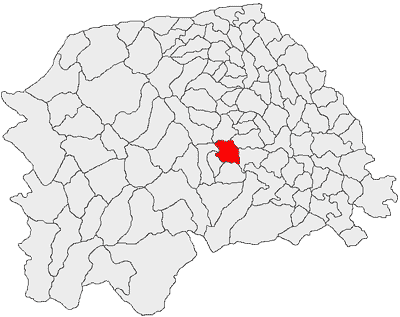
- Location in Suceava County

- Location in Romania
- Coordinates: 47°33′N 25°57′E
- Country: Romania
- County: Suceava
- Subdivisions: Păltinoasa, Capu Codrului

Government
  - Mayor (2024–2028): Eduard Wendling (PSD)
- Area: 36 km^{2} (14 sq mi)
- Elevation: 460 m (1,510 ft)
- Population (2021-12-01): 6,021
  - Density: 170/km^{2} (430/sq mi)
- Time zone: UTC+02:00 (EET)
  - Summer (DST): UTC+03:00 (EEST)
- Postal code: 727415
- Area code: (+40) x30
- Vehicle reg.: SV
- Website: primariapaltinoasa.ro

Păltinoasa (German: Paltinossa or Palti-nossa) is a commune located in Suceava County, in the historical region of Bukovina, northeastern Romania. It is composed of two villages, namely Capu Codrului (German: Kapukodrolui) and Păltinoasa.

== Administration and local politics ==
=== Communal council ===
The commune's current local council has the following political composition, according to the results of the 2020 Romanian local elections:

Party	Seats	Current Council
National Liberal Party (PNL)	10	
Social Democratic Party (PSD)	3	
People's Movement Party (PMP)	2	

== Notable people ==
- Joseph Kissmann (1889–1967), former leader of the General Jewish Labour Bund in Romania, member of the Parliament of Romania
