= Jewish cemetery, Chernivtsi =

Cemetery in Ukraine

Jewish cemetery on Zelena St
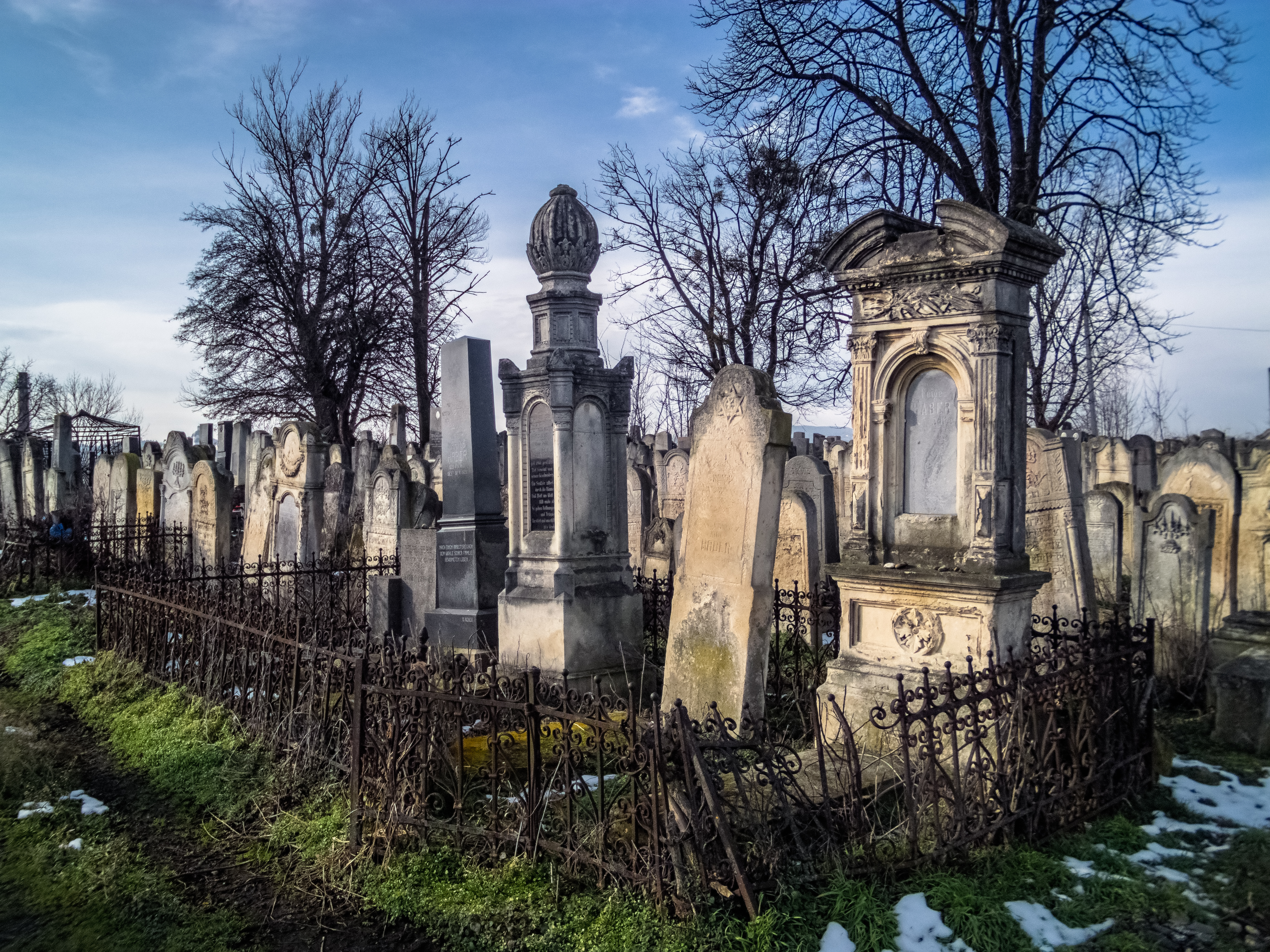
- A row of graves in the Jewish cemetery, Chernivtsi
- Interactive map of Jewish cemetery on Zelena St

Details
- Established: 1866
- Location: Chernivtsi, Ukraine
- Country: Ukraine
- Coordinates: 48.2942°N 25.9584°E
- Type: public
- Owned by: Municipal company "Historical-cultural preserve "Cemeteries at Zelena Street"
- Size: 14,2 ha
- No. of graves: c. 50,000
- Find a Grave: Jewish cemetery on Zelena St

The Jewish cemetery of Chernivtsi is a cemetery in the city of Chernivtsi, in Chernivtsi oblast, in western Ukraine.

== History ==
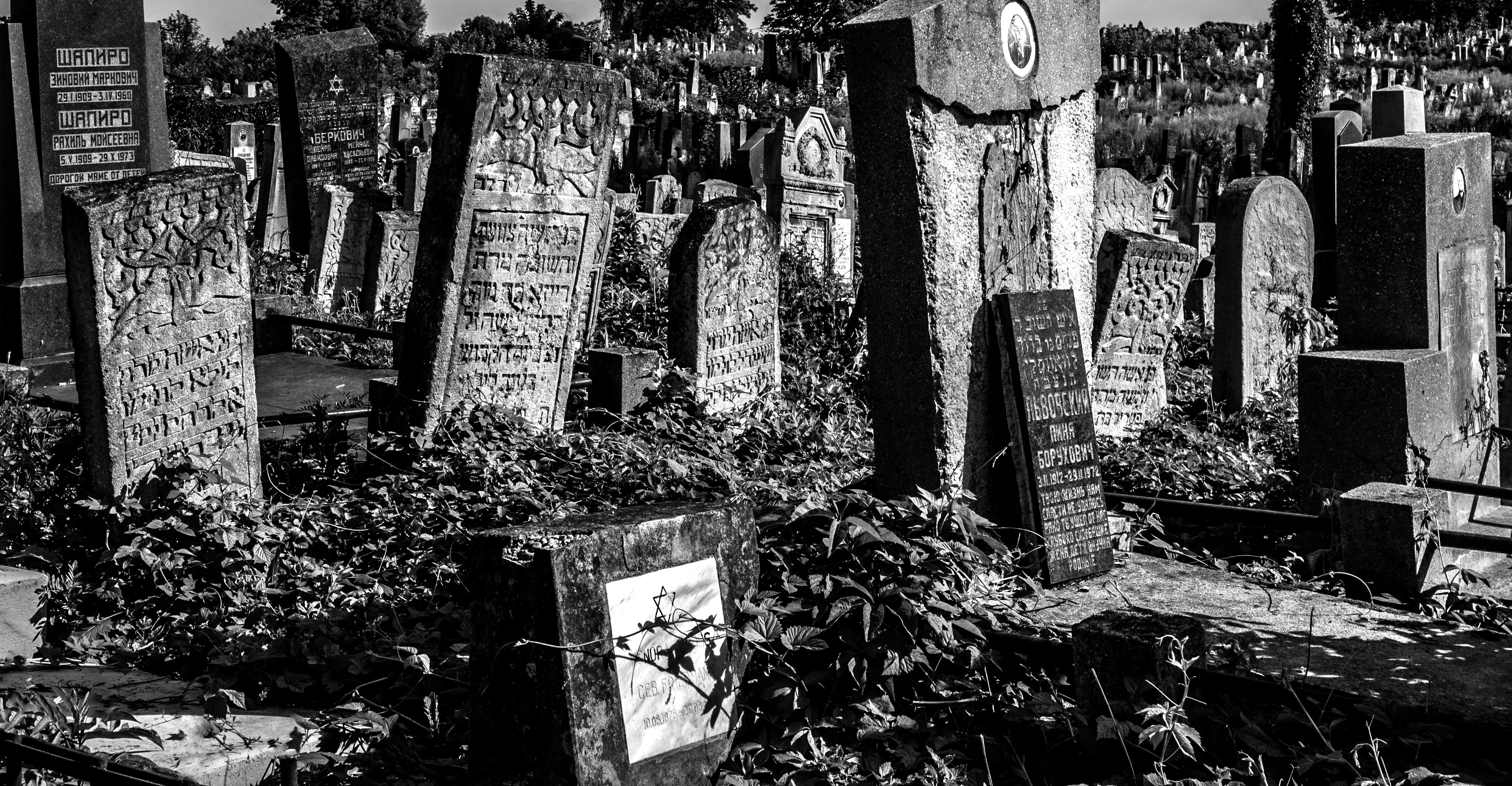
The Jewish cemetery in Chernivtsi is one of the largest preserved Jewish cemeteries in Central and Eastern Europe. Within Ukraine it is second to the Lychakiv Cemetery in Lviv

The Jewish cemetery on Zelena street. was established by decision of the municipality in the year 1866. The original plan of engineer Relli was to design the cemetery as a garden-park complex. The planning was completed by a designer by the name of Gaimbe. The original plot of land, allocated by the municipality for the cemetery, was significantly smaller than what the Jewish community thought was necessary and the Jewish community collected funds to buy more land to expand the cemetery to its current size.

Currently the size of the cemetery is about 14.2 hectares and consists of 137 rectangles, which together form one continuous closed complex. About 50 000 Chernivtsi citizens are interred in the cemetery, among them; the first Jewish mayor of the city, Eduard Reiss (1905–1907); Yiddish poet and author Eliezer Steinbarg, chief Rabbis of the community, deputy of Austrian parliament and Landtag of Bukovina, the prominent public activist and leader of the Jewish community Benno Straucher, the head of the Chernivtsi chamber of lawyers and renowned politician Max Fokschaner; as well as philanthropists Anna and Markus Kislinger; politician and deputy of Austrian parliament David Tittinger, honorary citizen of Chernivtsi Markus Kampelmacher, politicians and public activists Josef Steiner and Saul Leib Steinmetz, physicians Dr Siegmund Neuberger, Dr. Josef Ohrenstein, as well as many other people, who made significant contributions to the political, economic, cultural and public life of Chernivtsi.

While some of the tombstones and monuments are in traditional style, others vary greatly, indicating the growing wealth and high level of education of the population, as well as the social, cultural, artistic, religious and political tastes and ideals of the Jewish community of Chernivtsi. The monuments and tomb stones at the cemetery are in a remarkable diversity of forms, styles and shapes. There are stelae, sarcophagi, mausoleums and obelisks made of marble, granite, gabbro, sandstone, cement and other materials. Such famous sculptors were working at the cemetery as B. Reder, L. Kukurudza, Moskaliuk brothers, K. Kundl and others.

Ornaments on the monuments represent traditional Jewish symbolism. as well as elements of Ukrainian and Jewish folk art. The inscriptions are in Hebrew, German and Russian, and contain names, dates of birth and death, sometimes the profession or position of the person, or a poem or other epitaph. The monuments of the Soviet period often have a photo of the deceased etched in the stone.

The ceremonial building at the entrance to the cemetery, was erected in 1905 according to the design of the architect Fünkel and financed by the Jewish community. The building consisted of 4 rooms: a ceremonial hall, mortuary, ritual shop and office.

The cemetery has four mass graves: Jewish soldiers of Austrian army from World War I (1914–1918), Turkish soldiers, Romanian citizens who died in 1941–1942, and Jewish civilians, victims of Holocaust in 1941.

Since 1995, by the decision of the Chernivtsi city council, the cemetery is part of the historical-cultural preserve “Cemeteries at Zelena Street".” At present, the Jewish cemetery of Chernivtsi is one of the largest preserved Jewish cemeteries in Central and Eastern Europe. It is also a monument, and reminder of, the formerly large Jewish community of the city and its role in the politics, economy and culture of the city. In 2008 the Chernivtsi cleanup project was established by Christian Herrmann. Herrmann works with members of the former Jewish community of Chernivtsi to organize volunteers who help clean and maintain the cemetery. An organization to restore and maintain the cemetery was established in 2009 by Miriam (Mimi) Taylor a granddaughter of Shaul Leib Steinmetz and Shasha Wolloch, son of a Czernowtzer. The organization is called CJCRO. https://cjcro.org
