= Adolf Stand =

Zionist politician (1870–1919)

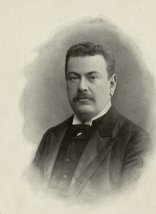
Adolf Stand

Avraham Adolf Stand (1870–1919) was a Jewish politician and leading Zionist activist in Austria-Hungary.

== Biography ==
Adolf Stand was born in Lemberg (today Lviv, Ukraine). He became a Zionist in the 1880s, taking an active role in organizing Zionist societies. He was the editor of the fortnightly Polish-language paper Przyszłość ("Future") and later Rocznik Żydowski ("Jewish Yearbook"). He was a fervent follower of Theodor Herzl and traveled throughout Galicia to speak about Zionism.

== Public activism ==
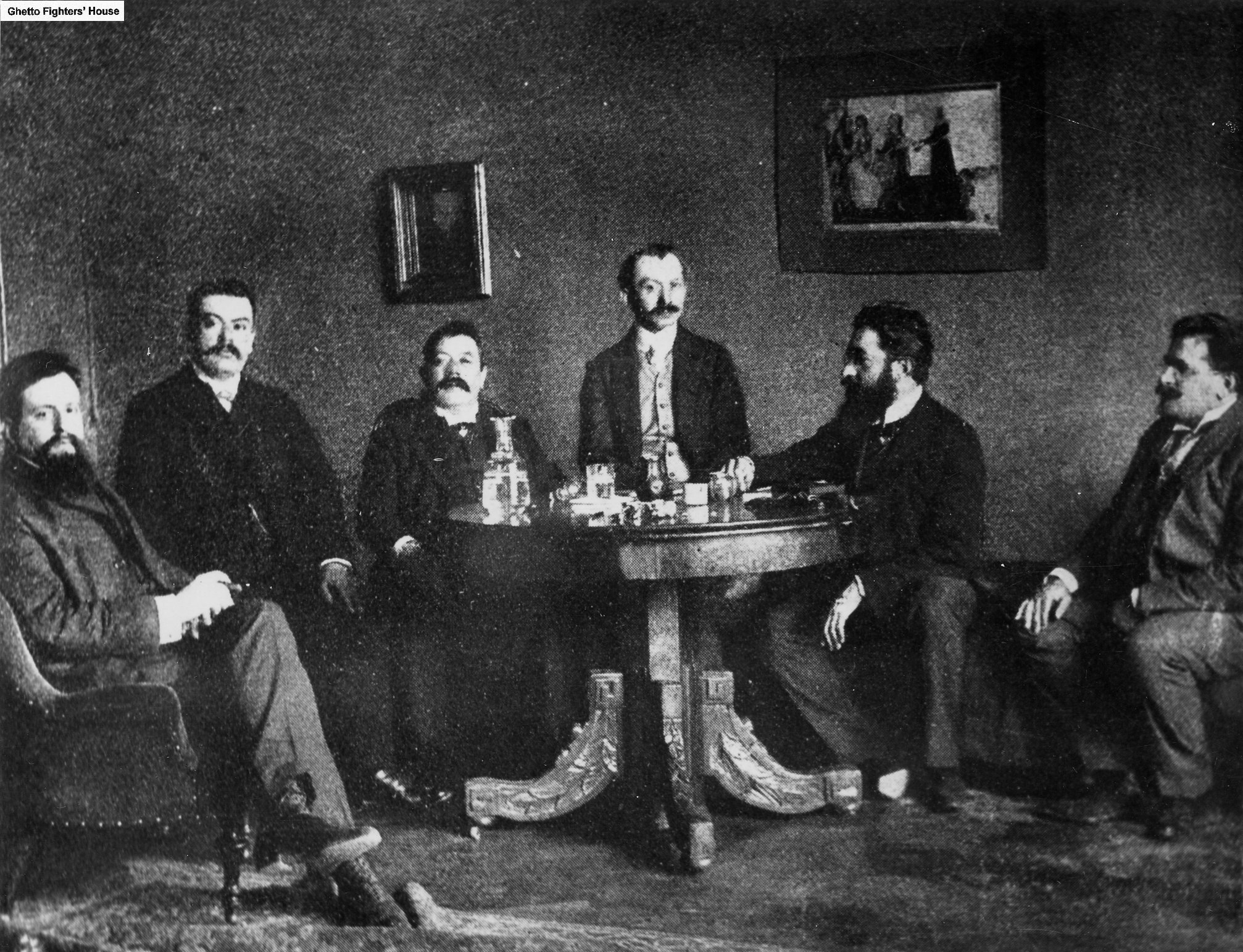
Members of the Jewish National Party in the Austrian Parliament (1907-1911), from left to right: J. Schalit, Adolf Stand, Benno Straucher, Heinrich Gabel, Arthur Mahler, M. Braude

Stand was president of the Zionist organization in Galicia and stood as a candidate in a parliamentary by-election in 1906. Stand obtained 454 votes, but was defeated by Joseph Gold (who won with 850 votes). The election was marred with irregularities. In the 1907 elections to the Austrian parliament, the first to be held with universal suffrage, Stand won the Brody seat as a candidate of the Jewish National Party. In total Stand obtained 2,585 votes in a run-off against Wollerner. He had obtained the support of the Jewish Social Democratic Party, who argued that Stand, despite being a reactionary, represented the lesser evil of the two run-off candidates.

== Tribute ==
A street in Tel Aviv is named after Stand.
