= Karl Klüger =

Romanian politician (1875–1943)

Member of the Senate of Romania
- In office 1926–1927

Deputy Mayor of Cernăuți
- In office 1931–1933

Personal details
- Born: 1875 Radautz, Duchy of Bukovina, Austria-Hungary
- Died: December 20, 1943 (aged 67–68) Bucharest, Kingdom of Romania
- Party: Jewish Party
- Other political affiliations: People's Party
- Education: University of Czernowitz

Karl Klüger (1875, Rădăuți – 20 December 1943, București) was a journalist, writer, and politician of Bukovinian Jewish origin, active in Austria-Hungary and the Kingdom of Romania. He was active as editor, cultural organizer, and senator in interwar Romania, where he played a leading role in supporting the reconstruction and economic life of the Jewish community of Bukovina after the First World War.

== Biography ==
Karl Klüger was born in 1875 in Rădăuți (then part of Austria-Hungary, today in Romania). He attended the local gymnasium and went on to study law at the Franz Joseph University in Czernowitz. Belonging to the relatively small circle of professional journalists in the city, Klüger became active in public life at the turn of the 20th century.

In August 1903, he was appointed editor-in-chief of the Czernowitzer Tagblatt, a position he held until 1918. After the dissolution of Austria-Hungary and the incorporation of Bukovina into Romania, he worked for the American Jewish Joint Distribution Committee (Joint) in Czernowitz from 1919.

In 1920, Klüger founded the Society for the Reconstruction of the Jewish Population of Bukovina, Ltd. (commonly called the "Joint Bank"), which administered Joint funds and committed to use them "exclusively for the purpose of rebuilding ruined livelihoods of the Jewish population of Bukovina, through loans in cash or goods to its members" (promissory note, 26 January 1926). As president of the society, Klüger was responsible for rebuilding houses destroyed during the First World War, particularly in Sadagura, Vășcăuți (Waschkoutz), and Vișnița (Wischnitz). He also oversaw measures aimed at stimulating economic recovery and revitalizing Jewish social life in Bukovina throughout the 1920s.

Klüger also served as president of the curatorium of the Economic Association of Jewish Students, where he successfully organized the construction of a student dormitory in Czernowitz after Romanian authorities confiscated the city’s multiethnic dormitory and excluded Jewish students from access.

In 1926, Klüger was elected to the Romanian Senate, and between 1931 and 1933 he held the office of Mayor of Deputy Mayor of Czernowitz.

Alongside his political and community activities, Klüger devoted himself increasingly to writing during the 1920s. In 1928, his book Das elfte Gebot (The Eleventh Commandment), a collection of literary sketches, was published by R. Löwit Verlag in Vienna and Berlin.

After the Soviet occupation of Bessarabia and Northern Bukovina, Klüger lived in Bucharest, where he died on 20 December 1943.

== Works ==
- Das elfte Gebot (The Eleventh Commandment), R. Löwit Verlag, Vienna/Berlin, 1928

== See also ==
- History of the Jews in Bukovina
- History of the Jews in Chernivtsi
