= Jewish National Party =

Defunct Austrian political party

Jewish National Party Jüdischnationale Partei
- Leader: Robert Stricker
- Founded: 1892
- Dissolved: c. 1934
- Ideology: Zionism; Jewish minority interests
- International affiliation: World Zionist Congress
- 1919 Constitutional Assembly: 1 / 170

The Jewish National Party (German: Jüdischnationale Partei) was an Austrian political party of the Jewish minority.

== History ==
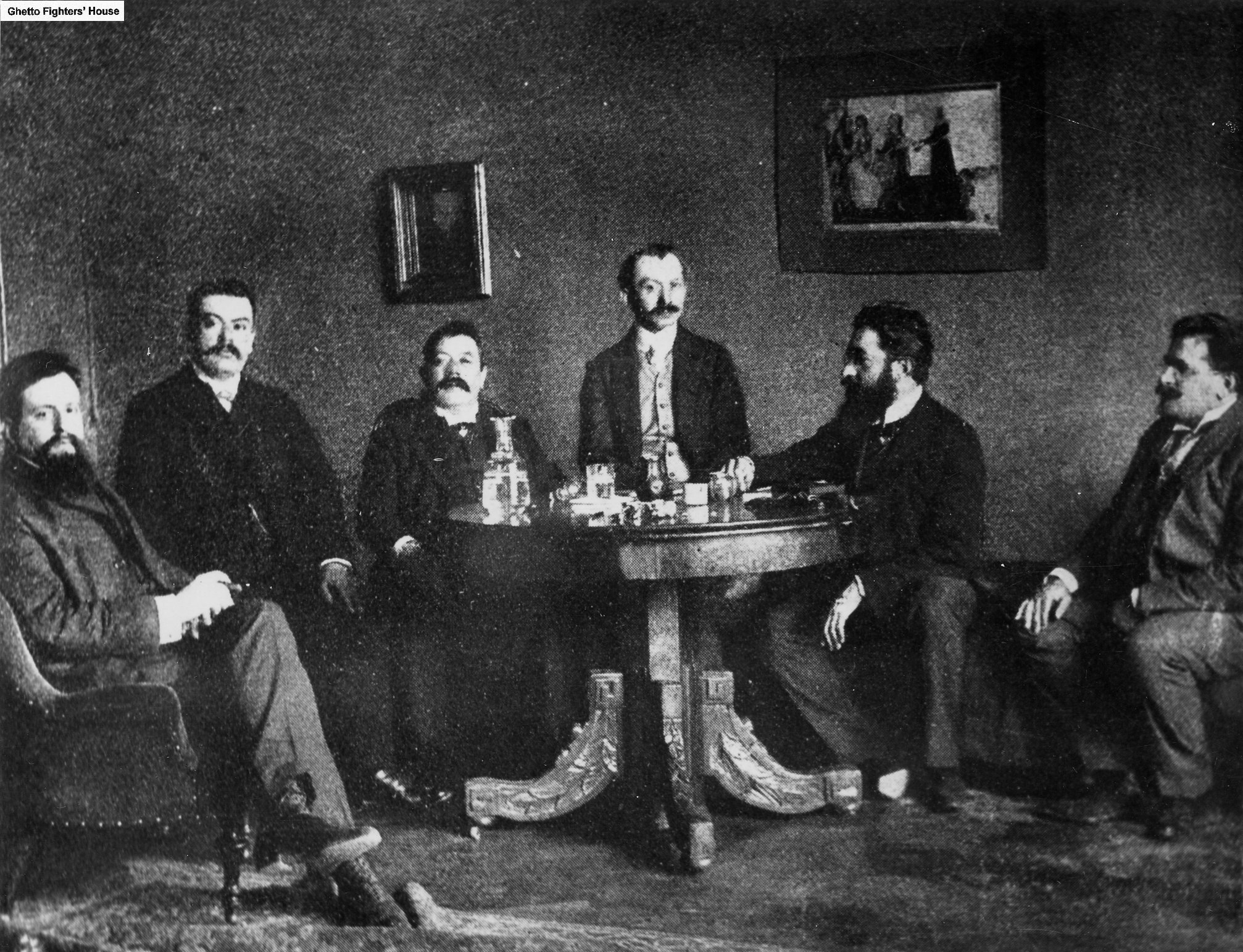
Members of the Jewish National Party in the Austrian Parliament (1907-1911), from left to right: J. Schalit, Adolf Stand, Benno Straucher, Heinrich Gabel, Arthur Mahler, M. Braude

A Jewish National Party (Jüdische Nationale Partei) was already founded in 1892 at Lemberg (Lviv), then the capital of the Austrian Kingdom of Galicia, as part of the Zionist movement in Austria-Hungary. It took part in the regional Sejm elections as well as in the 1907 Cisleithanian legislative election, gaining four parliamentary seats at the Austrian Imperial Council:

- Benno Straucher from Czernowitz, founder of the regional Jewish National People's Party in 1906
- Adolf Stand, Brody
- Arthur Mahler
- Heinrich Gabel, East Galicia.

Only Straucher was re-elected at the 1911 election.

The Jewish National Party took part in the 16 February 1919 election to the 1919 Constituent Assembly and got 7,760 votes (0.26%). Its only elected MP was Robert Stricker, a board member of the Vienna Israelite Community.

At the next elections on 17 October 1920 a change in the electoral law eliminated all the minor parties from the Parliament. At the 21 October 1923 elections, a new party, the Jewish Electoral Community (Jüdische Wahlgemeinschaft) failed again to elect a representative, with 24,970 votes (0.8%), as the Jewish Party (Jüdische Partei) on the 24 April 1927 elections, with 10,845 votes (0.3%), the Jewish List (Jüdische Liste) on the 9 November 1930 elections, with 2,133 votes (0.1%).
