= General Jewish Labour Bund in Romania =

General Jewish Labour Bund in Romania Uniunea generală a muncitorilor evrei „Bund” în România
- Founded: 1922
- Preceded by: ŻPS
- Ideology: Socialism; Bundism
- Political position: Left-wing

1929 Romanian Bund poster, announcing a public meeting with Henryk Ehrlich as guest speaker

The General Jewish Labour Bund in Romania (Yiddish: אלגעמײַנער ײדישער ארבעטער בונד אין רומעניע, Romanian: Uniunea generală a muncitorilor evrei „Bund” în România) was a Jewish socialist party in Romania, adhering to the political line of the General Jewish Labour Bund. Founded in 1922, shortly after the establishment of Greater Romania, it united Jewish socialists in Bukovina, Bessarabia and the Romanian Old Kingdom. Standing for the lay wing of the Jewish representative movement, the Romanian Bund had atheistic leanings and offered an alternative to the mainstream Jewish organization. Like other Bundist groups, but unlike the Marxist-inspired Poale Zion bodies of Bessarabia, it rejected Zionism.

== History ==
In 1922 the Bundists of Bukovina (who had belonged to the Jewish Social Democratic Party in Austria-Hungary) decided to approach the Jewish socialists from the Old Kingdom and Bessarabia and propose a unification. The General Jewish Labour Bund in Romania was founded at a conference in Cernăuţi (now Chernivtsi, Ukraine) on January 6–7, 1923. At the founding conference there were four delegates from the Old Kingdom, three from Bessarabia and from Bukovina there were delegates from Cernăuţi, Rădăuţi, Suceava, Siret and Storojineţ. Soon after the founding of the party, a support organization was founded in the United States, called the Gross Rumänische Arbeiter Liga ("Greater Romanian Workers League").

During the interwar period, the General Jewish Labour Bund stood as one of several small organizations which represented the enlarged Jewish community of Greater Romania, covering the ground between the right-wing representatives of Jewish nationalism and the far left. The party had its main strength in Bessarabia, and to a lesser extent in Bukovina. Well represented at kehilla elections in the Bessarabian city of Chişinău, it lacked political presence in Transylvania. The party had a strong influence in the Yiddish school movement in Bessarabia, but was in competition over political support with the Zionists at Poale Zion and the Agudat Yisrael of Haredi Jews. The Bessarabian branch had also links with the Soviet Communist Party. Bukovina, the Bund was secondary to the Jewish Autonomist movement led by Benno Straucher and his Jewish National People's Party.

At the 1922 Senate election in Czernowitz, the Bundist Leon Gheller, standing for the Romanian Social Democratic Party, was defeated by 1,991 votes to 3,800 for Salo Weisselberger. The seat was beforehand occupied by another Social Democrat, George Grigorovici.

Another (former) Bundist, Litman Ghelerter, led to the creation in July 1928 with Ștefan Voitec of a splinter group from the Romanian Social Democratic Party, the Socialist Workers Party of Romania (PSMR).

The party had limited electoral success. Only in 1932 a Bundist entered the Parliament of Romania: Joseph Kissmann, who was elected in Northern Bessarabia.

Although it survived the disappearance of its Russian mother party (persecuted by the Soviet authorities after 1920), the General Jewish Labour Bund of Romania itself ceased to function at the time of the Second World War.

== See also ==
- Bessarabian Jews
