= Arthur Mahler =

Czech-Austrian archaeologist (1871–1916)

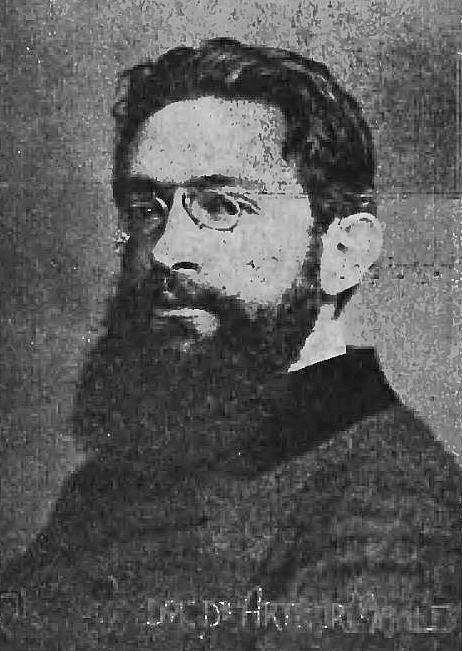
Artur Mahler (before 1907)

Artur Mahler (1 August 1871 – 2 May 1916) was a Czech-Austrian archeologist and politician. He was a cousin of composer Gustav Mahler.

== Biography ==
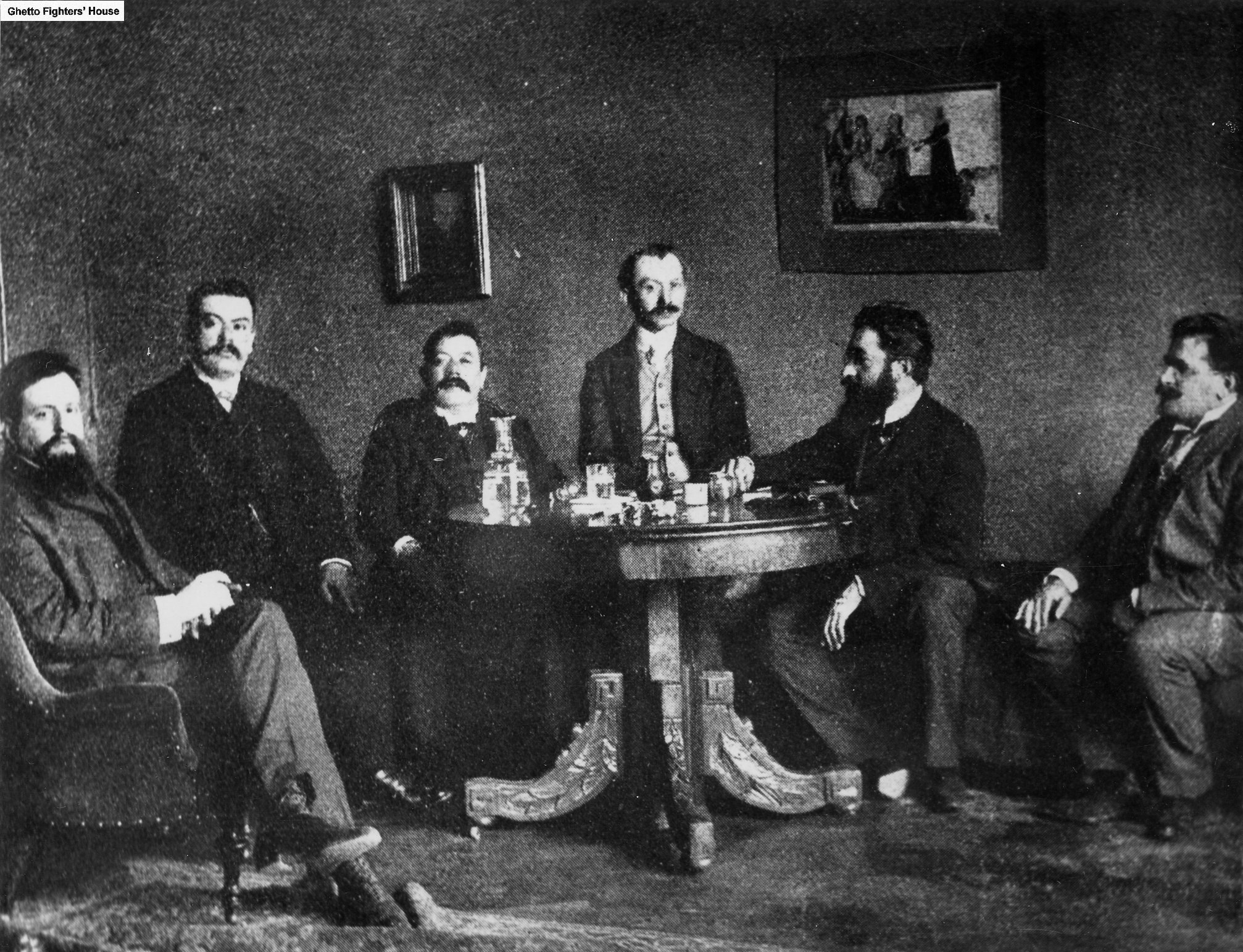
Members of the Jewish National Party in the Austrian Parliament (1907-1911), from left to right: J. Schalit, Adolf Stand, Benno Straucher, Heinrich Gabel, Arthur Mahler, M. Braude

Mahler was born on 1 August 1871 in Prague. After completing his studies at the gymnasium in Prague, he studied the history of art and archeology at the universities of Prague and Vienna (Ph.D.), and in 1902 became privatdozent in archeology at the German university at Prague.

Mahler was a member of the Austrian House of Representatives from 1907 to 1911 for the Jewish National Party. He died on 2 May 1916 in Vienna, at the age of 44.

Artur Mahler was married to Sophie Mahlerová. Their son, Willy Mahler, died in 1945 in Dachau concentration camp.

== Literary works ==
Mahler contributed a number of articles to:

- "Jahreshefte des Österreichischen Archäologischen Institutes"
  (of which institute he is a corresponding member)
- "Revue Archäologique"
- "Journal d'Archäologie Numismatique"

He is the author of Polyklet und Seine Schule: ein Beitrag zur Gesch. der Griechischen Plastik (Leipzig, 1902).

He also delivered a series of lectures at the American School for Archeology at Rome.
