= Salo Weisselberger =

Austro-Hungarian-Romanian Jewish politician, jurist, and judge (1867–1931)

Salo Weisselberger Edler von Weisselberger
- סלו ווייסעלבערגער
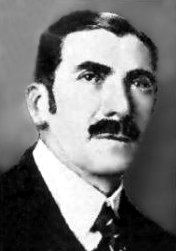

Member of the Chamber of Deputies of Romania
- In office 1927–1928

Member of the Senate of Romania
- In office 1922–1926

Mayor of Chernivtsi
- In office 1913–1918
- Preceded by: Felix Freiherr Brewer von Fürth
- Succeeded by: Yosyp Bezpalko

Personal details
- Born: Salomon Weisselberger; 1867 Drachyntsi, Duchy of Bukovina, Austria-Hungary (now Ukraine)
- Died: March 1931 (aged 63–64) Vienna, First Austrian Republic
- Party: Jewish National People's Party (1911–1914); National Liberal Party (1922–1931)
- Education: University of Czernowitz

Salomon Weisselberger (Note: Ukrainian: Соломон Вайссельберґер, romanized: Solomon Vaisselberger; Yiddish: סלומון ווייסעלבערגער, romanized: Salumun Veyselberger) (1867 – March 1931), also surnamed as von Weisselberger (Note: Ukrainian: фон Вайссельберґер; Yiddish: פון ווייסעלבערגער, romanized: fun Veyselberger) was an Austro-Hungarian and Romanian Jewish politician, jurist and judge who served as a member of Bukovina's Landtag during the Austro-Hungarian Empire, mayor of Czernowitz, a member of the Senate of Romania, and then a member of its Chamber of Deputies.

Salo Weisselberger was born in Dracynetz, near Czernowitz and studied law at the University of Czernowitz. Based on school achievements he was appointed judge at the Court of railroads and county in 1892. Later, he was elected member of the Regional Parliament (Landtag) of Bukovina from 1911 to 1914 for Benno Straucher's Jewish National People's Party. He became the mayor of Czernowitz in 1913, after having served several years as vice-mayor, and in 1914 he was deported by the Russian occupation troops as a hostage to Siberia, whence he returned to Austria in 1916, after a hostage exchange in November 1915 between Russia and Austria-Hungary. He was ennobled by the Austrian Emperor Franz Joseph for his sufferances.

After the dissolution of Austro-Hungarian Empire, Bukovina became a part of the Kingdom of Romania, and Weisselberger was a member of the Romanian Senate from 1922 to 1926 and of the Chamber of Deputies from 1927 to 1928. When elected to the Senate for Czernowitz, he got 3,800 votes against 1,991 for the Social Democrat candidate, the Bundist Leon Gheller. The seat was beforehand occupied by another Social Democrat, George Grigorovici.

He died in March 1931 in a Vienna sanatorium.

== See also ==
- List of mayors of Chernivtsi
