= Strick =

Strick may refer to:

- Stricklin or Strick, a member of hip hop group eMC
- Strick Shofner (1919–1998), American baseball player
- Strick, American rapper from North Carolina
- Strick corp, American truck manufacturer from Fort Washington, Pennsylvania

== Family name ==
- Charles Strick (1858–1933), American baseball player
- Joseph Strick (1923–2010), American director, producer and screenwriter
- Maria Strick (née Becq; 1577–after 1631), Dutch schoolmistress and calligrapher
- Paul Strick van Linschoten (1769–1819), Dutch diplomat
- Wesley Strick (born 1954), American screenwriter

== See also ==
- Stryk
- Stricker
- Strickland (surname)
