= Diana Dumitru =

Moldovan historian who was born in Mereni, Aneni Noi in 1973 03 12

Diana Dumitru is a Moldovan historian, who is the Ion Ratiu Professor in Romanian Studies at Georgetown University in the US. She is considered the leading scholar of the fate of Bessarabia's and Bukovina's Jews during the Holocaust.

== Life ==
Diana Dumitru earned a Bachelor of Arts in history and psychology, and a PhD in history from the Ion Creanga State Pedagogical University of Moldova. She is considered the leading scholar of the fate of Bessarabia's and Bukovina's Jews during the Holocaust.

Dumitru has received a number of fellowships, including a Fulbright Fellowship and the Gerda Henkel Stiftung fellowship. She was the Rosenzweig Family Fellow at the Mandel Centre of the United States Holocaust Museum in 2005/06, where she conducted research on the Holocaust in the areas of Bessarabia and Transnistria. In 2019 Dumitru was a research fellow at the Wiener Wiesenthal Institute for Holocaust Studies in Vienna, where she studied Soviet society and the aftermath of the Holocaust. As of 2025, Dumitru is the Ion Ratiu Professor in Romanian Studies at Georgetown University.

Dumitru has authored two books. She co-wrote a Holocaust survivor memoir, Across the Rivers of Memory, published in 2015, with Felicia Carmelly. Her second book, The State, Antisemitism and the Collaboration in the Holocaust. The Borderlands of Romania and the Soviet Union, was published by Cambridge University Press in 2016. She edited the 2024 book The Russian Invasion of Ukraine: Victims, Perpetrators, Justice, and the Question of Genocide published by Routledge, with A. Dirk Moses.

Dumitru is a member of the advisory board of the EU project European Holocaust Research Infrastructure. She is on several editorial boards, including those of the Journal of Genocide Research, Holocaust and Genocide Studies, and East European Jewish Affairs.

== Works ==
- Dumitru, Diana (2016). The State, Antisemitism, and Collaboration in the Holocaust: The Borderlands of Romania and the Soviet Union. Cambridge University Press. ISBN 978-1-316-55881-2.
- Diana Dumitru (5 March 2011). "Attitudes towards Jews in Odessa: From Soviet rule through Romanian occupation, 1921-1944". Cahiers du monde russe. 52 (1): 133–162. doi:10.4000/MONDERUSSE.9324. ISSN 1777-5388. Wikidata Q129910137.
- Diana Dumitru (19 October 2022). "Five Lives of a Holocaust Survivor: On Shifting Identities, the Search for Belonging, and Building Meaning". East European Politics and Societies. 37 (1): 369–390. doi:10.1177/0888325420958130. ISSN 0888-3254. Wikidata Q133625760.
- Diana Dumitru (2019). "Jewish Social Mobility under Late Stalinism: A View from the Newly Sovietizing Periphery". Slavic Review. 78 (4): 986–1008. doi:10.1017/SLR.2019.257. ISSN 0037-6779. Wikidata Q133625767.
- Diana Dumitru (22 October 2018). "Genocide for "Sanitary Purposes"? The Bogdanovka Murder in Light of Postwar Trial Documents". Journal of Genocide Research. 21 (2): 157–177. doi:10.1080/14623528.2018.1534662. ISSN 1462-3528. Wikidata Q133625778.
- D. Dumitru (1 January 2008). "The Use and Abuse of the Holocaust: Historiography and Politics in Moldova". Holocaust and Genocide Studies. 22 (1): 49–73. doi:10.1093/HGS/DCN002. ISSN 1476-7937. Wikidata Q133625805.
