= Jewish Social Democratic Party in Galicia =

Jewish Social Democratic Party in Galicia יידישער סאציאל-דעמאקראטישער פארטיי אין גאליציען
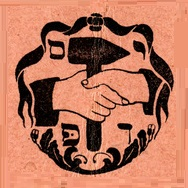
- Founded: 1905
- Split from: Polish Social Democratic Party of Galicia
- Merged into: General Jewish Labour Bund in Poland (Polish section, 1920); General Jewish Labour Bund in Romania (Bukovina section, 1922)
- Membership (1911): 4,500
- Ideology: Social democracy Bundism
- Political position: Left-wing

The Jewish Social Democratic Party in Galicia (Yiddish: יידישער סאציאל-דעמאקראטישער פארטיי אין גאליציען, Yidisher Sotsial-Demokratisher Partey in Galizien, Polish: Żydowska Partia Socjal-Demokratyczna, abbreviated ŻPS) was a political party in Galicia and later also Bukovina, established in a split from the Polish Social Democratic Party of Galicia (PPSD) in 1905. The party made its first public appearance on May 1, 1905, with separate May Day rallies in Kraków, Lemberg, Tarnów and Przemyśl. However, as the new party stressed that it was not a competitor of the existing Social Democratic parties, they later joined the PPSD celebrations.

The Party, often nicknamed the 'Galician Bund', was influenced by the Bund in Russia and was opposed to Zionism.

ŻPS held its founding congress in June 1905. The second congress was held in 1906.

Its founding theoretician and secretary was Henryk Grossman. While the Party sought affiliation to the Social Democratic Workers Party of Austria, this was refused. The ŻPS became the largest organisation of Jewish workers in Galicia.

In the initial period of the existence of the party, it publish a monthly titled Der yudisher sotsial-demokrat. In October 1905 it was replaced by a weekly, Der sotsial-demokrat. As of 1910, Der sotsial-demokrat had a circulation of 2000.

In 1911 the Jewish Social Democracy in Galicia, the Jewish affiliate section of the PPSD, merged into the ŻPS. The Jewish Social Democracy in Galicia had 377 members at the time of the merger. The strength of the party reached its peak when the Bukovina Bundists merged into the party the following year. The united party took the name Jewish Social Democratic Party in Galicia and Bukovina.

In 1913, several prominent leaders of the erstwhile Jewish Social Democracy began returning to the PPSD. More devastating for the ŻPS, though, was the outbreak of the First World War. Galicia and Bukovina became battlefield, and party activities ceased. The branch in Kraków was reconstructed in 1916, and in the fall of 1917 there was a conference of delegates from different local ŻPS branches. On 15, 1918 Der sotsial-demokrat reappeared.

In 1920, its organisation in Poland merged with the Polish Bund. In Bukovina, now part of Romania, the remnants of the party continued to operate under the name 'Bund', and in 1922 they founded (along with Jewish socialists from Old Romania and Bessarabia) the General Jewish Labour Bund in Romania.

== Membership ==
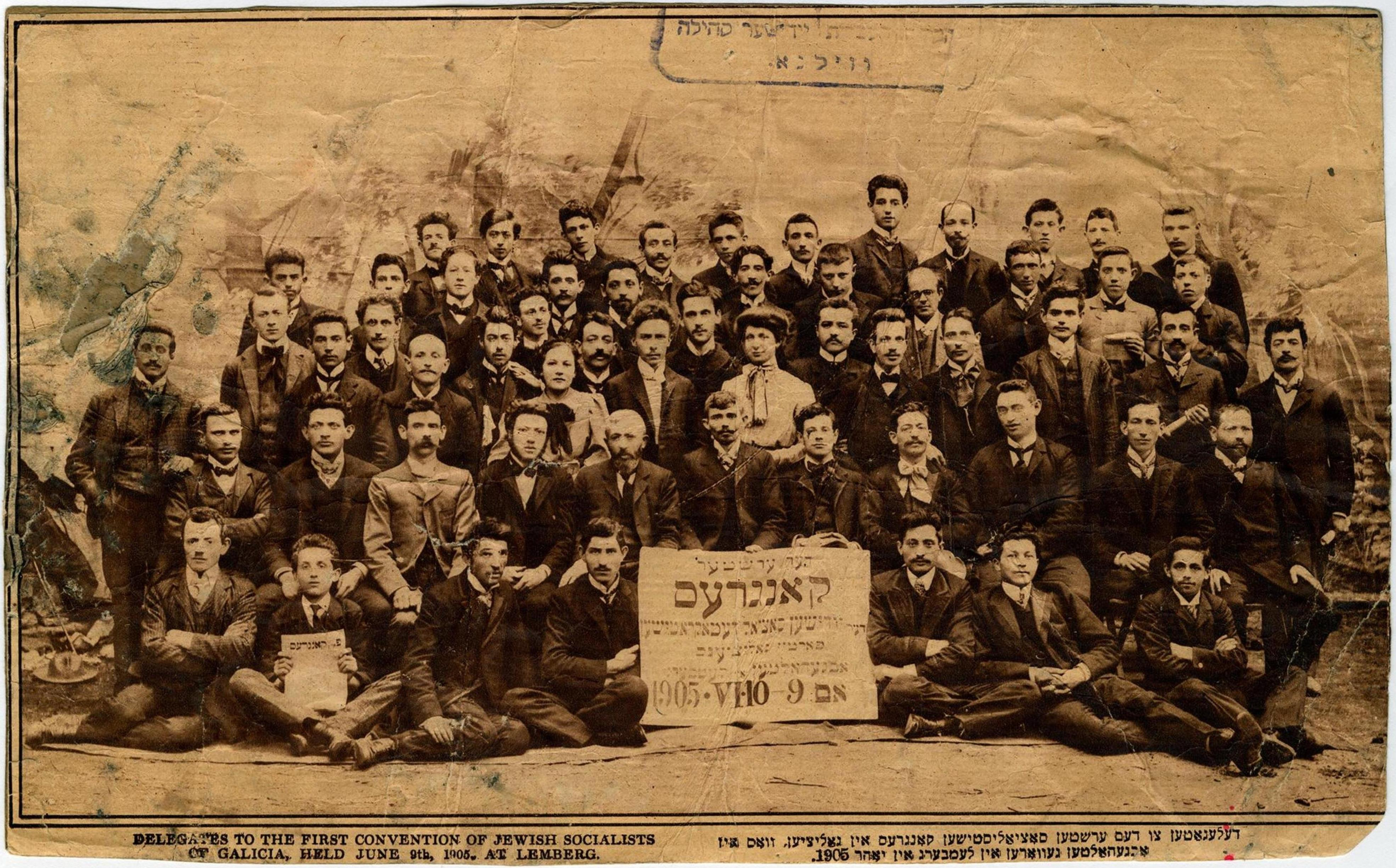
First convention of Jewish Social Democratic Party - Lemberg, 1905

The party had 2,800 members in 1906, by 1908 the figure had risen to 3,600 and by 1910 it claimed a membership of 4,206. At the time, the party had 80 branches in 32 different localities. In 1911, after the merger with the Bukovina Bund, the party had 4,500 members.

Except for its organization in Galicia and Bukovina, the party also had presence (at warying times) in Vienna, New York City, Antwerp and Bielsk.

== See also ==
- Central Rada
