= Strucker =

(von) Strucker may refer to:

- Strucker Family, a fictional Marvel Comics family
  - Baron Strucker, real name Wolfgang von Strucker, a Marvel Comics character
  - Elisbeth von Strucker, Marvel Comics character and wife of Baron Strucker
  - Andreas von Strucker, Marvel Comics character, son of Baron Strucker, and twin of Andrea von Strucker
  - Andrea von Strucker, Marvel Comics character, daughter of Baron Strucker, and twin of Andreas von Strucker
  - Werner von Strucker, Marvel Comics character and son of Baron Strucker
  - Reed Strucker, a character in the Marvel television series The Gifted
  - Caitlin Strucker, a character in the Marvel television series The Gifted
  - Andy Strucker, a character in the Marvel television series The Gifted
  - Lauren Strucker, a character in the Marvel television series The Gifted
