= Jewish National People's Party =

- Founded: 1906

The Jewish National People's Party was a regional Jewish political party of Zionist orentation, founded in 1906 in the Bukovina Austrian crown land by Benno Straucher, elected at the Austrian Parliament's Abgeordnetenhaus for the (Austrian) Jewish National Party since 1897. The party remained active in interwar Romania.

== Under the Austrian-Hungarian Empire ==
=== Elections to the Austrian House of Representatives ===
Benno Straucher was first defeated at the Austrian House of Representatives elections in 1891 against incumbent (since 1879) Heinrich Wagner. He was more successful at the next elections in 1897 against Anton Kochanowski, the mayor of Chernivtsi, and at the following elections in 1900 he was reelected with the support of the Zionists, who chose not to present a candidate from their ranks. He was again reelected in 1911.

=== Elections to the Regional Parliament of Bukovina ===
Following the 1911 Regional Parliament election, 8 out of 10 Jewish legislators were affiliated to the Jewish National People's Party: Josef Blum, Jancu Fischer, Jakob Hecht, Dr. Isidor Katz, Salomon Rudich, Dr. Benno Straucher, Dr. Salo Weisselberger and Dr. Neumann Wender.

=== Elections to the city council of Chernivitsi ===
The “Straucher's list” won 20 of the 50 city council seats in 1905, one of Straucher's fellow party members, Dr. Eduard Reiss became mayor of Chernivtsi from 1905 to 1908.

== Under the Kingdom of Romania ==
Benno Straucher was elected to the Romanian Chamber of Deputies in 1920 and 1922. The Jewish National People's Party allied itself with the Union of Romanian Jews for the 1927 elections and Dr. Straucher was again elected from the list of the National Liberal Party. He was defeated at the 1934 elections by another Jewish candidate from the same party.
