= Jewish Social Democratic Association Bund =

Socialist Organization

The Jewish Social Democratic Association Bund was a Jewish socialist organization in Bukovina, named after the Russian General Jewish Labour Bund.

After the defeat of the 1905 Russian revolution, several members of the Russian Bund fled to Bukovina (part of Austria-Hungary), where they were received by local Jewish socialists. The Bukovina Jewish socialist members of the Social Democratic Workers Party of Austria began orienting themselves towards Bundist ideas and an informal Bundist grouping emerged. In neighbouring Galicia, the Bundist-oriented Jewish Social Democratic Party was founded in 1905. The Bukovina Bundistn ("Bundists") were sympathetic towards the Galician party, but were wary of publicly joining it as this would have resulted in a breach with the Austrian party. The Bukovina Bundistn sent a two-member observer delegation to the 1908 congress of the Galician party. In the fall of 1908 an educational association called Morgenrot, albeit officially apolitical, was founded along Bundist lines. Soon thereafter, the Bukovina Bundistn registered a formal political association named 'Bund'. After its foundation, the Bund association began campaigning for the recognition of a separate Jewish nationality in the Austrian census of 1910.

In order to be able to register themselves as an association with the Austrian authorities, the organization had to adhere to the stringent rules of Austria-Hungary for political associations. Thus formal membership was restricted to male Austrian citizens aged 24 years or above.

The Bukovina Bund merged with the Jewish Social Democratic Party of Galicia in 1912. After the merger, the party adopted the name 'Jewish Social Democratic Party in Galicia and Bukovina'.
