= Eduard Reiss =

Austrian politician (1850–1907)

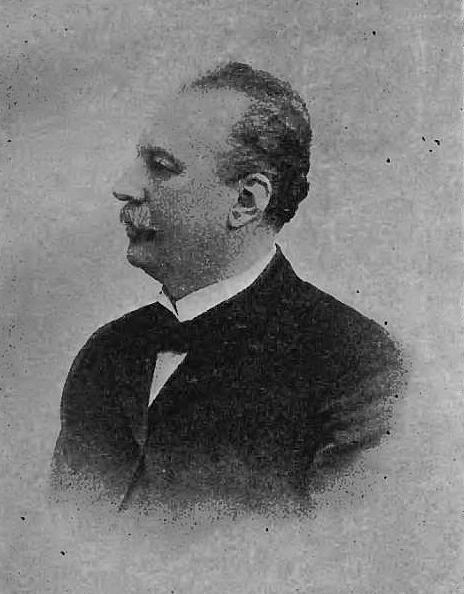

Mayor of Czernowitz
- In office 12 April 1905 – 27 April 1907

Personal details
- Born: May 8, 1850 Saliszi, Kingdom of Galicia and Lodomeria, Austrian Empire
- Died: April 27, 1907 (aged 56) Vienna, Austria-Hungary
- Party: Jewish National People's Party
- Occupation: Jurist, politician
- Known for: First Jewish mayor of Chernivtsi

Eduard Reiss (or Eduard Reiß; 8 May 1850 – 27 April 1907) was an Austrian (Cisleithanian) jurist and politician, Doctor of Law, and the first Jewish mayor of the city of Czernowitz.

== Biography ==
Reiss came from a family of assimilated Jews. His father was a military physician who, in 1856, settled in Czernowitz with his family and opened a medical practice there.

He attended the k.k. I. Staatsgymnasium Czernowitz (Imperial and Royal State Gymnasium No. 1 in Chernivtsi). Among his schoolmates was Mihai Eminescu, later to become Romania’s national poet. Like another schoolmate, Karl Emil Franzos, Reiss firmly supported a Judeo-German cultural symbiosis. After graduating from high school, in 1868 he began studying at the University of Vienna, first completing two semesters of medicine before switching to law. He was a member of the student association Wiener Landsmannschaft Bukowina. After completing his studies, he returned to Chernivtsi in 1872, taking a position at the Regional Court. In 1875 he delivered the ceremonial speech at the banquet marking the inauguration of Franz Joseph University, being among its first doctoral graduates. That same year, he joined a law firm in Czernowitz. In 1879 he became an honorary member of the student association Akademische Burschenschaft Arminia Czernowitz zu Linz. From 1880, he was a member of the Bukovina Bar Association and practiced as an independent lawyer. In the Austro-Hungarian Army’s 65th Hungarian Infantry Regiment “Archduke Ludwig Viktor,” he had already been serving as a reserve lieutenant since 1871, being promoted to the rank of lieutenant major in 1880.

In 1884, Reiss was elected to the municipal council for the first time. Between 16 January 1894 and 12 April 1905 he served as deputy mayor, being re-elected seven times. During this period, numerous urban modernization projects were carried out: the introduction of water and sewage networks, electric lighting, street paving, and the establishment of a tram service.

On 12 April 1905, Reiss was elected mayor of Czernowitz with 48 votes out of 50, becoming the first Jewish mayor of a provincial capital in Austria, affiliated with the Jewish National People's Party. He was not the last in Czernowitz, being succeeded in 1912 by Salo von Weisselberger. Re-elected on 7 February 1907, during his two-year term until his sudden death, the city saw the inauguration of the Municipal Theatre, the new railway station, and the Palace of Justice. He died in Vienna, at a sanatorium where he was being treated after a stroke. His body was brought by train to Chernivtsi, and the funeral procession began at the station. He was buried in the Jewish Cemetery of Czernowitz on 30 April 1907, at 2 p.m. He was survived by his wife, Fanny, and their two children, Alma and Joseph.

== Honours ==
- Order of Franz Joseph (1880)
- Title of k.k. Regierungsrat (Imperial and Royal Government Councillor) (1900)

== Legacy ==
On the day of his funeral, 30 April 1907, the Municipal Council decided to rename Schlangengasse, the street where the Reiss family lived. In the 1908 city plan it already appears under the new name. During the Romanian administration it was renamed Mircea Vodă Street, and in the Soviet period it became vul. Ukrainska (Ukrainian Street).

Reiss’s grave is located at the entrance to the Jewish Cemetery in Chernivtsi. The Jewish community donated an honorary crypt and erected above it a canopy resembling a chapel, decorated with the metal inscription “Dr. Eduard Reiß Bürgermeister.” The monument rusted during the Soviet period but was restored after 1990.

His portrait was displayed in the council chamber of Chernivtsi City Hall. After disappearing for a time, it was returned in 1998 on the occasion of the 150th anniversary of Bukovina’s autonomy, alongside the portraits of all the city’s mayors.
