= Struck =

Struck is a surname. Notable people with the surname include:

- Adolf Struck (1877–1911), German author
- Hermann Struck (1876–1944), German artist
- Karin Struck (1947–2006), German author
- Paul Struck (1776-1820), German composer
- Peter Struck (politician) (1943–2012), German politician (SPD)
- Peter Struck (classicist), professor at the University of Pennsylvania.
- Sille Struck (born 1998), Danish footballer

== See also ==
- Strikebreaker
