= Joseph Kissmann =

Romanian lawyer and journalist (1889–1967)

Member of the Chamber of Deputies of Romania
- In office 1932–1933

President of the Jewish Labor Bund of Romania
- In office 1930–1937
- Preceded by: Iacob Pistiner

Personal details
- Born: July 13, 1889 Paltinossa, Duchy of Bukovina, Austria-Hungary
- Died: December 31, 1967 (aged 78) New York City, United States
- Party: General Jewish Labour Bund in Romania
- Other political affiliations: Romanian Social Democratic Party
- Education: University of Vienna
- Occupation: Lawyer, journalist, political activist, historian

Joseph "Iosif" Kissmann (July 13, 1889 – December 31, 1967) was a Romanian Jewish lawyer, journalist, and socialist leader. He served as president of the Jewish Labor Bund of Romania from 1930 to 1937, representing the party in the Romanian Parliament. He was active in socialist circles in Central and Eastern Europe and worked as a legal representative for Jewish communities in the Austro-Hungarian Empire and then, during the interwar period, Romania. He published works about the history of Romanian Jewry in Romanian, English, German and Yiddish.

== Early life ==
Kissman was born in the village of Păltinoasa, in the Duchy of Bukovina, then part of the eastern Austro-Hungarian Empire. The village was known for its sawmill industry and had a small but vibrant Jewish population. His father, Leiser Kissmann, owned multiple sawmills and was married to Bertha Scharfstein, a member of a prominent local Jewish family. Joseph received early education at home with the help of a private tutor, Max Binderman, a Viennese law student who later introduced socialist ideas to the family.

At the age of 14, Kissmann left home to attend high school in Siret. After graduation, he moved to Vienna to study law at the University of Vienna. However, before completing his first year, he went to Lviv (then known as Lemberg) to work with the Yiddish socialist publication Der Sozialdemokrat.

== Political and legal career ==
Kissman’s involvement with Der Sozialdemokrat brought him into contact with Jewish socialist circles across Galicia and Bukovina. During this period, he began corresponding with Leah Rosenbaum, whom he later married in November 1913. He returned to Vienna to complete his legal studies and passed three years’ worth of examinations in a single year.

In 1914, he began working as a legal intern in Gura Humorului, but the outbreak of World War I forced him and his wife to flee across the Carpathians to Bucharest, in the Kingdom of Romania. There, Kissman worked as a correspondent for the Austrian socialist newspaper Arbeiterzeitung. When Romania entered the war in 1916, he was interned as an enemy alien in a prison camp near Ploiești, and later near Iași. He was released after the Russian Revolution in 1917.

Following the war, he returned to Vienna and became involved in post-imperial socialist politics, participating in demonstrations that led to the fall of the monarchy. His wife Leah worked in emergency relief, helping to bring aid to the city during the food and fuel shortages of the early republic.

In 1920, Kissmann moved to Cernăuți (now Chernivtsi, Ukraine) to serve as legal representative for the American Jewish Joint Distribution Committee. He joined the General Jewish Labour Bund in Romania and later opened his own legal practice, focusing on cases involving labor rights, tenant protections, and political detainees. His work was effectively that of a one-man legal aid bureau for the marginalized.

=== Bundist leadership ===
From 1930 to 1937, Kissmann served as president of the Jewish Labor Bund in Romania, after the death of Iacob Pistiner. During this period, he took an anticommunist stance and he became one of the leading figures in Jewish socialist movements in Romania and in Central Europe. Although his relatives were involved in the lumber industry, Kissman distanced himself from their business and was often critical of labor practices in the sector.

However, the Bund's popularity in Romania was limited. Because of this, it former an alliance with the Social Democratic Party. He was elected to the Chamber of Deputies in 1932, representing several electoral districts in Northern Bessarabia.

After the ascension of fascist parties in Romania, he was arrested, during the premiership of Octavian Goga. After he was released, he went to Bucharest. He and his family left Romania in 1938 and settled in New York City.

=== Later life and death ===
Kissman survived the turmoil of World War II. He remained involved in Jewish and socialist circles, contributing to community discussions and publications. He died on December 31, 1967, at the age of 78. Funeral services were held in New York on January 3, 1968.
