= Stricker =

Stricker (German for "knitter") is a surname. Notable people with the surname include:

- Der Stricker, the pseudonym of a 13th-century Middle High German itinerant poet
- Cub Stricker (1859–1937), American baseball player (second baseman)
- Dominic Stricker (born 2002), Swiss professional tennis player
- Erwin Stricker (1950–2010), Italian skier
- Eva Zeisel (1906–2011), Jewish Hungarian industrial designer
- Johannes Stricker (1816–1886), Dutch theologian and biblical scholar
- John Stricker (1758–1825), Maryland militia officer
- Louis Stricker (1884–1960), South African cricketer
- Robert Stricker (1879–1944), Jewish Czech-Austrian politician
- Salomon Stricker (1834–1898), Jewish Hungarian-Austrian pathologist, histologist
- Steve Stricker (born 1967), American professional golfer
- Tal Stricker (born 1979), Israeli Olympic breaststroke swimmer

== Other ==
- Katy Hamman-Stricker Library
- Stricker's Grove, a small amusement park in Ross, Ohio, USA
- Rock Creek Station and Stricker Homesite
