= Robert Stricker =

Austrian politician (1879–1944)

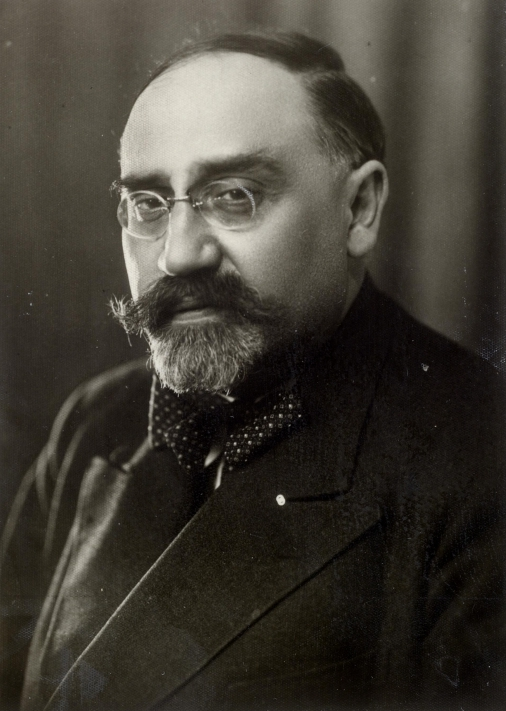
Robert Stricker

Robert Stricker (16 August 1879 – 28 October 1944) was a Jewish Austrian politician.

Born in Brno (present-day Czech Republic), Stricker graduated from high school at the technical college. He entered the service of the Imperial Royal Austrian State Railways, where he was active in management.

He was elected at the 1919 Austrian Constitutional Assembly election as the only representative of the Jewish National Party, founded in 1907 under the Austro-Hungarian Empire, which never again succeeded in sending a representative to the Austrian Parliament.On May 30, 1919, Robert Stricker married the widow Paulina (Paula) Kohn (born 1888) in Vienna and adopted her son Wilhelm (Bill) from her first marriage. In 1920, Robert and Paula Stricker's daughter Judith were born. He was a member of the Radical Zionists faction headed by Yitzhak Gruenbaum and Nahum Goldmann, but left in 1930 to join the Revisionist Zionism faction.

In addition, Stricker was a Zionist activist, and for many years was a board member of the Israelitische Kultusgemeinde Wien. He was the publisher of the Jewish weekly magazine Die Neue Welt, established in 1926 as a replacement for the defunct Zionist journal Die Welt.

After the Anschluss, Robert Stricker was sent to Dachau, but was eventually released. In 1942 he was sent to Theresienstadt, and is reported to have been killed in October 1944 in Auschwitz. with his wife; Wilhelm and Judith fled and survived the war

== Bibliography ==
- Stricker, Robert, Jüdische Politik in Oesterreich : Tätigkeitsbericht und Auszüge aus den im österreichischen Parlamente 1919 und 1920 gehaltenen Reden / Robert Stricker, Wien : Wiener Morgen-Zeitung, [1920?], 39 p. (on microfilm at the Library of Congress)
- Fraenkel, Josef (ed.), Robert Stricker, London, 1950, 94 p., LCCN 54031133
