= History of the Jews in Bukovina =

Jewish community in Bukovina

The Jews in Bukovina have been an integral part of their community. Under Austria-Hungary, there was tolerance of Jews and inter-ethnic cooperation.

== Life under Austria and Romania ==
According to the Romanian-Israeli historian Moshe Idel, Baal Shem Tov, the founder of Hasidic Judaism, was born in the Principality of Moldavia, in the area that would later become Bukovina.

Bukovina was conquered by the Austrian Archduchy in 1774. It developed into one of the most diverse provinces in the Archduchy and later in the Austrian Empire; it was also the province with one of the highest Jewish populations.

The first Austrian census reported a population of 526 Jewish families. As immigration from Galicia, Moldova, and Ukraine grew, the Austrian authorities began to deport the newcomers. Some laws against Jews were revoked in the 1810s. There was a gradual elimination of discrimination of Jews after the 1848 revolution, leading up to all laws against them being removed in 1867. Many of the Jews in Bukovina, along with Germans, immigrated to North America in the late 19th and early 20th century. Despite this, Austria's census reported over 12% Jewish population in Bukovina. When Austria-Hungary collapsed in 1918, Romania took control of Bukovina. In the early 1920s, state posts began to require native Romanian language skills. This law served to legitimize further anti-Semitic legislation. In the late 1930s under Romania, the citizenship of 8.54% of Bukovina's Jews was revoked for alleged fraud by antisemitic governments in 1937–1939, which was the lowest in the territories that became a part of Romania in 1918 (outside the Old Kingdom). Overall, 36.5% of Romania's Jewish population lost its Romanian citizenship in the process, including 61.61% of the Jewish population of Bessarabia, 17.96% in Transylvania and 21.47% in Banat. Like Germany's Jews, they were additionally sent to forced-labor camps.

== Soviet occupation and Axis period ==
The Soviet Union occupied the northern part of Bukovina on 3 July 1940. Some communist and pro-Soviet Jews, as well as other minority inhabitants (e.g., Ukrainians) attacked ethnic Romanians and the retreating Romanian soldiers. As Romanian troops retreated from the area, they carried out a pogrom against the local Jews in Dorohoi. The Romanian authorities saw the pogrom as a revenge for the crimes committed by the communists in the territories annexed by the Soviets.

Many inhabitants were deported to Siberia from that region following the Soviet takeover, including a disproportionate number of Jews. According to the authoritative estimate of Dov Levin, the top expert in the history of the Jews in the territories occupied by the Soviet Union in 1939–1940, from 1995 with which Jean Ancel concurred in 1998, the number of Bukovinian Jews who were deported to Soviet Asia in June 1941 was 5,000, together with 10,000 from Bessarabia; about half of those from Bessarabia survived and returned to Bessarabia according to a source mentioned by Jean Ancel (Matatias Carp), the specialist on the Holocaust in Romania and Transnistria; however, Carp's estimate is not confirmed by other sources. A number of at least 4,000 of the Bukovinian Jews deported to Siberia by the Soviet in 1941 were from Chernivtsi according to Jean Ancel in 1990; hundreds were from the provincial towns. According to Dr. Avigdor Schachan, who wrote a book about the Transnistrian ghettos, and was himself brought up in the Bessarabian part of the present-day Chernivtsi Oblast of Ukraine, about 2,000 northern Bukovinian and 4,000 Bessarabian Jews were deported to the Soviet east. The number of inhabitants of the Chernivtsi Oblast who were deported to Siberia and Kazakhstan was 7,720 (2,279 families). According to some sources, most of the deportees of June 1941 from the Chernivtsi oblast, who were of many ethnicities, did not return from the Soviet east. However, the fragmentary, locality-by-locality, evidence indicates that most of the deportees from 1941 survived. In his 2011 book on the Holocaust in Romania, Ancel noted that "thousands" of Chernivtsi Jews were deported to Siberia. According to some sources, most of the deportees from the Chernivtsi oblast of all ethnicities to the Soviet north and east died. However, the fragmentary, locality-by-locality, evidence indicates that most of the deportees from 1941 survived. Only 1,136 of those deported from the Izmail oblast were still alive in Western Siberia, in the Tomsk region, in 1951.

On June 22, 1941, the Axis invaded the Soviet Union and Northern Bukovina was reoccupied in June–July 1941. At least 5,000 to 10,000 Bukovinian Jews, as well as at least 45,000-50,000 Bessarabian Jews, at least 50,000-60,000 Jews from the ex-Romanian areas overall, escaped into the Soviet interior from the Axis invasion. Perhaps as many as 100,000 to 130,000 Jews from Bessarabia and northern Bukovina left with the Soviets (including the deportees), including 124,000 according to Radu Ioanid.

The Romanian recovery of northern Bukovina, Bessarabia and Hertsa had a disastrous effect on the Jewish population, as the invading German and Romanian soldiers immediately began to massacre Jews. Thousands of Bukovinian Jews (perhaps as many as 10,000) were killed by Romanian and German soldiers, by Einsatzgruppe D (a German SS mobile killing unit specialized in killing Jews and Communists in the territories of the former Soviet Union), as well as ethnic Ukrainian (a majority of the population) and Romanian northern Bukovinian civilians, before the deportations to Transnistria. The number of Jews who were killed in Bukovina was 8,500 according to the Yad Vashem database, with names included. The number of Jews who were killed in the city of Chernivtsi itself was 3,372 according to the Yad Vashem database, with names included. Most of these Jews were killed by the German Einsatzgruppe D. The total number of Chernivtsi Jews killed by the SS (Einsatzgruppe D) in July and August 1941 was 3,106 according to the Einsatzgruppe reports, while the Romanians killed 400, though survivor testimonies suggest that perhaps more people were killed. In a July 18, 1941, memorandum to Romania's military dictator Ion Antonescu, the National Peasants' Party leader Iuliu Maniu protested in two paragraphs against the massacres of Bessarabian and northern Bukovinian Jews as well as the Iasi pogrom.

The survivors were forced into ghettos, awaiting their transfer to work camps in Transnistria; the deportations took place in the fall of 1941. On October 4, 1941, the Romanian Supreme General Staff sent an order to the Cernauti Military Command that indicated that Romania's military dictator Ion Antonescu had ordered the deportation to the east of the Dniester of the Jews of Bukovina, meaning the geographical/historical province, and not the expanded Guvernamantul Bucovinei. At the request of military dictator Ion Antonescu, Bukovina's governor, Corneliu Calotescu announced on October 10, 1941, his decision that all the Jews of Cernăuți must be deported to Transnistria by train. The Jews of Secureni Camp in Hotin County (a Bessarabian county at that time administratively a part of Bukovina) were evacuated in two groups, on October 2 and 5, while those in Edinet Camp in the same county were evacuated on October 10 and 13, both on foot and in carts rather than by train, based on orders that predated Calotescu's order. At his trial in 1945, Calotescu was accused of being responsible for the deportation of 56,000 Jews from Bukovina and of 12,000 Jews from Dorohoi County.

According to some sources, about 57,000 Jews from Bukovina were deported to Transnistria by the Romanian authorities by November 1941. According to a Jewish leadership source, this number included the Jews of town of Hertsa and the Hertsa region, as well as a part of the Edinet camp Jews of Hotin County of northern Bessarabia as well as a part of the Jews of Dorohoi county; only 5,500 of the Jews were listed as having been deported out of Dorohoi County, though the number was much higher (see below). Jean Ancel provides slightly higher figures by county from April 9, 1942, again from a report from General Corneliu Calotescu, the governor of Bukovina, with 33,891 from Cernauty County, 6,118 from Campulung County, 3,919 from Storojinet County, 5,942 from Suceava County, 9,169 from Radauti County, including the part annexed by the Soviet Union (and thus 59,039 from historical Bukovina), 23,439 from Hotin County in northern Bessarabia and 9,367 from Dorohoi County in the Old Kingdom (excluding the Jews of Hertsa, which were already in a camp in Hotin County), all a part of administrative Bukovina, a total of 91,843 Jews deported to Transnistria. As reported by Calotescu himself in September 1942, the total number of Bukovina Jews from the enlarged administrative Bukovina rather than merely historical Bukovina deported to Transnistria amounted to 90,284, however this figure may not include those who died in transit camps. According to the September 1, 1941 census, there were 83,496 Jews in Bukovina and Dorohoi County (including 11,547 from Dorohoi County) and 21,468 in Hotin County, a total of 104,964 people; while after the 1941-1942 deportations, only 19,349 Jews remained in Bukovina and Dorohoi and 126 in Hotin County; the difference was 85,489. If one excludes Hotin County, which is included in the figures for Bessarabia, on November 15, 1943, there were 31,141 Bukovinian Jews and 6,425 Dorohoi Jews in Transnistria, a total of 37,566; this would suggest that only 43.94% of the deportees from historical Bukovina and Dorohoi County alive on September 1, 1941, were survivors of the deportations to Transnistria. However, about 16,794 of the Jews were allowed to stay in Chernivtsi, and 17,159 in Bukovina in its historical borders, after that. If one includes the 2,316 Jews who were allowed to remain in Dorohoi County, the total number was 19,475. According to Jean Ancel, hundreds, probably thousands, of Bessarabian and Transnistrian, and to a lesser extent Bukovinian Jewish children were handed over by their parents to non-Jews in order to guarantee their survival.

The number of Jewish deportees to Transnistria sent there in 1941 who reached the latter province included 110,033 people, including 55,867 from Bessarabia, 43,798 from Bukovina, 10,368 from Dorohoi County (minus the Hertsa area); out of these, 50,741 still survived by September 1, 1943. In November 1943, according to General Constantin Vasiliu, undersecretary of state for police and security in the Ministry of the Interior, if one includes the Jews deported from Dorohoi in 1942, but excluding the Hertsa area, 10,368 Jews were deported from the county, while if one includes the Jews of Hertsa, about 12,000 or more were deported. All the Jews deported from Chernivtsi in 1941 were deported by train; half of the transports went to Atachi, typically middle-class people, many of whom were able to take lei and valuables into Transnistria (just like the southern Bukovinian Jews), directly on the border with Transnistria, from where they crossed the border into Transnistria, and were not beaten and forced to buy food at high prices in a transit camp. The other half, mostly working class individuals, were sent to the transit camp in Marculesti transit camp, where most gave up much of their jewelry and precious metals in exchange for food, and were often beaten and plundered by Romanian gendarmes, and from where they walked to nearby Atachi to be sent across the river to Transnistria. A further 4,290 Chernivtsi Jews were deported to Transnistria in June 1942. The Romanian military dictotor Ion Antonescu's justification for allowing some Jews to remain in Chernivtsi and Bukovina appears in one of his resolutions: "I regret for the decent people. There must be some of these too."

Besides the above-mentioned deportations of Jews to Transnistria in June 1942, Bukovina's governor Corneliu Calotescu reported to Ion Antonescu on August 21, 1942, that 147 Bukovinian Jewish Communists were deported to Transnistria, mainly from the city of Chernivtsi. In 1942, about 150 Jews from Bukovina were brought to the Vapniarka concentration camp; they included some refugees from Poland.

According to the Romanian gendarmerie, on September 1, 1943, 50,741 Jewish deportees survived in Transnistria, including 36,761 from Bukovina, including Dorohoi County (historically a part of the Old Kingdom of Romania, but administratively a part of Bukovina at that time), and 13,980 from Bessarabia. According to the statistics from the office of the Romanian prime minister of November 15, 1943, by province of origin from Romania and of county of residence in Transnistria, in the latter area there were 49,927 Jewish deportees who had survived, including 31,141 from Bukovina (without Dorohoi County, but including Hotin County), 11,683 from Bessarabia (without Hotin County), 6,425 from Dorohoi County, and 678 from the rest of Romania. The same document indicates that there were 706 Jews sent there from the rest of Romania (the Old Kingdom and southern Transylvania) in the camp at Grosulovo, which brings the total number of Jews deported from Romania still alive in Transnistria to 50,633. In October 1943, the administrative regulation forcing Jews to wear the Star of David was revoked, and Jews were allowed to move freely around the capital city of Bukovina. By the time Bukovina was retaken by Soviet forces in February 1944, some sources are suggesting that less than half of the entire Jewish population in the region had survived. According to the Shoah Resource Center of Yad Vashem, about half of the Jews of Bukovina died. About 1,500 Jews from Chernivtsi converted to Christianity to be saved from deportation to Transnistria.

Most of the survivors went to Romania after the war, where the more liberal policies allowed emigration to Israel. The list of the Jewish deportees to Transnistria from Bukovina at a memorial dedicated to them in the city of Siret includes 51,089 names provided by Yad Vashem in 2024. The number of Jews listed by name who died or were killed in the Holocaust or Soviet repression who had lived in (historical) northern and southern Bukovina before the war in the Yad Vashem database as of 2025 was 50,814, whereas 7 died indirectly died because of the Holocaust, and 1,707 were "registered following the evacuation/ in the Interior of the Soviet Union". According to the Yad Vashem database, 27,937 Jews whose names are listed who had lived in Bukovina before the war died in Ukraine (including Transnistria) during the Holocaust. The number of Bukovinian Jews whose death was caused by the Soviet authorities is unknown, but 86 died in Siberia, while others died in Central Asia, etc. According to the Yad Vashem database, 60,732 Jews whose names are listed who had lived in Bessarabia before the war were killed during World War II, while 133 died indirectly in relation to the Holocaust. The number of the Bessarabian Jewish victims of the Holocaust exceeded that of the Bukovinian ones.

There were significant differences in the survival rates in Transnistria depending on the place of origin in Bukovina. About 60% of the Jewish deportees to Transnistria from the city of Chernivtsi died there according to the Jewish Virtual Library. According to Gali Mir-Tibon, most of the Jews deported from the city of Chernivtsi, as well as northern Bukovina in general, to Transnistria did not survive. All the Jews deported from Chernivtsi in 1941 and 1942 were deported by train; half of the 1941 transports and all the 1942 ones went to Otaci (Atachi at that time), typically middle-class people, many of whom were able to take lei and valuables into Transnistria (just like the southern Bukovinian, Dorohoi County and Storozhynets Jews), directly on the border with Transnistria, from where they crossed the border into Transnistria, and were not beaten and forced to buy food at high prices in a transit camp. The other half, mostly working class individuals, were sent to the Marculesti transit camp, where most gave up much of their jewelry and precious metals in exchange for food, and were often beaten and plundered by Romanian gendarmes, and from where they walked to nearby Atachi to be sent across the river to Transnistria. According to the Yad Vashem database, 19,424 Jews who had lived in Chernivtsi before the war whose names are listed died in the Holocaust. In southern Bukovina, the area that was not annexed by the Soviet Union (but excluding Dorohoi County), there were 18,140 Jews according to the April 6, 1941 general population census; on May 20, 1942, on the day of the census of the Jews, after the deportations to Transnistria, there were 179 Jews. According to a Romanian government report of November 20, 1943, more than 12,000 of them had survived; in addition to those, there were some southern Bukovinian orphans, who were treated as a part of a different category. If one includes the Jewish orphans from southern Bukovina, according to a study, 70% of the southern Bukovinian Jews survived the deportation to Transnistria. According to another study, over 70% of the Jews of southern Bukovina deported to Transnistria survived. In the fall of 1941, 6,118 Jews, almost the entire Jewish population of Campulung County/Judet, was deported to Transnistria. A Romanian official document from 1946 suggests that most Jews in Campulung County survived the Holocaust. The number of Jews who died in Transnistria or did not return to their domicile in the county from there was listed as 1,076, which represented roughly 17.6% of the Jews who were deported, which should be seen as the minimum number of Jews who died.

In 1941–1944, Dorohoi County, historically a part of the Old Kingdom of Romania, was officially/administratively a part of Bukovina. Almost all the Jews who lived in the town of Hertsa (1,204) and in the rest of the Hertsa area (14), which were under Soviet rule in 1940-1941 and in 1944–1991, on September 1, 1941, were deported to Transnistria by the Romanian authorities, where most of them died; only 450 were alive in December 1943, when the repatriation of the Jews to Dorohoi County by the Romanian authorities started, while about 800 Jews died. The Romanian army and authorities killed 100 Jews on July 5, 1941, before the deportation to Transnistria. For the entire Dorohoi County ("Judet"), a large majority of which remained in Romania, 6,425 Jews survived the deportations to Transnistria, while 5,131 died between September 6, 1940, and August 23, 1944, during the Antonescu dictatorship, overwhelmingly due to the deportations of 1941 and 1942. After the November 1941 deportations of Jews from Dorohoi County (9,367 Jews) and June 1942 (360 Jews), excluding the Jews from the Herta area that had been under Soviet occupation, 2,316 Jews were not deported. There is a list of about 3,000 Jews deported from Dorohoi. At the end of 1943, 6,053 Jews deported from Dorohoi County (excluding a large majority of the Jews from the Hertsa area) were returned by the Romanian authorities to the county. Jean Ancel has shown that the decision to deport the Jews of Dorohoi county in 1941 "originated form local government officials, such as members of the military, civil servants and lawyers". It was authorized by Governor Calotescu of Bukovina. When Romania's military dictator Ion Antonescu (who had ordered the 1941 deportations of the Bessarabian and Bukovinian Jews to Transnistria) was informed of the deportations, and an intervention by Jewish leader Wilhelm Fillderman and a National Peasant Party politician, he ordered that the Jews who were about to board the train not be deported to Transnistria. The 1942 deportations of Jews from Dorohoi County seem not to have been ordered by Ion Antonescu, who nevertheless ordered the deportations of Chernivtsi and Chisinau Jews in that year. In the book by the great late Holocaust scholar Raul Hilberg, the dean of Holocaust studies, cites Antonescu's statement in the meeting of the Council of Ministers of November 17, 1943; Antonescu stated in reference to the Jews of Dorohoi County, "Those from Old Roumania, who have been removed by mistake, will be brought back to their homes." On March 14, 1944, Romania's military dictator Ion Antonescu allowed the repatriation of all the Jews deported to Transnistria.

An organization of Jews from Bukovina, known as Landsmannschaft, was founded in Tel Aviv in 1944 by Manfred Reifer. Bukovinian Jews living in the United States helped to create the Museum of Bukovinian Jewry in 2008.

=== Traian Popovici and the Jews of Cernăuți, and Other Interventions ===
In 1941, the new governor announced his decision that all the Jews of Cernăuți must be deported to Transnistria. After talks with the governor, the latter agreed that Traian Popovici, the new mayor of Cernăuți under Romanian administration, would be allowed to nominate 200 Jews which were to be exempted. Unsatisfied with the modest concession, Popovici tried reaching Antonescu himself, this time arguing that Jews were of capital importance to Cernăuți's economy and requested a postponement until replacements could be found. As a result, he was allowed to expand the list, which covered 20,000 Jews in its final version.

Traian Popovici is honored by Israel's Yad Vashem memorial as one of the Righteous Among the Nations, an honour given to non-Jews who behaved with heroism in trying to save Jews from the genocide of the Holocaust.

Dorimedont Popovici, the uncle of Traian Popovici, the vice-president of the National Council of Bukovina, member of the Romanian parliament and cabinet minister, originally from the People's Party and then from the National Peasant Party, also intervened with Ion Antonescu for the stopping of the deportations of Jews from Bukovina and other things through a 74-page memorandum; there were also other similar interventions. Another major figure who intervened in favor of the stopping of the deportations of Jews to Transnistria was the Metropolitan of Bukovina, Tit Simedrea, as it was noted in the first major published book on the Holocaust in English, citing the Chief Rabbi of Romania, Alexandru Safran. Iuliu Maniu, the National Peasants' Party leader, condemned the deportations of Jews to Transnistria and he intervened to Ion Antonescu so that the latter would stop the deportations.

== See also ==
- Galician Jews
- Emigration of Jews from Romania
- History of the Jews in Transnistria
- History of the Jews in Chernivtsi
- History of the Jews in Bessarabia
- Dorohoi County
- Hertsa
- Shargorod
- Mohyliv-Podilskyi
- Tulchyn
- Edgar Hilsenrath
- Norman Manea
- Diana Dumitru, Moldovan researcher of the Holocaust in Bukovina
