= Mișu Benvenisti =

Romanian-Israeli Zionist and lawyer (1902–1977)

- מישו בנבנישתי
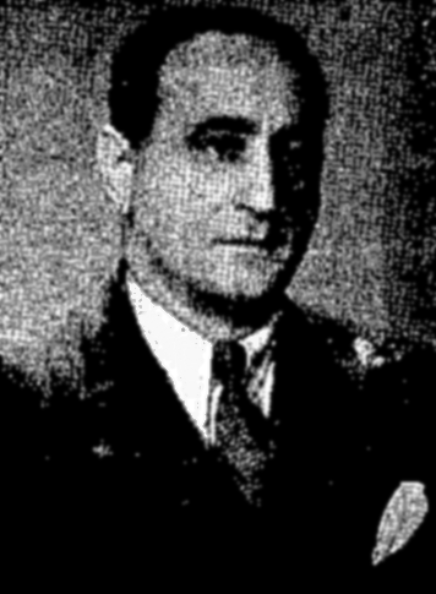
- Benvenisti in 1948

President of the Jewish Party
- In office July 21, 1946 – 1947
- Preceded by: Collective leadership
- Succeeded by: none (party dissolved)

Chairman of the Romanian Zionist Executive
- In office March/April 1941 – January 1944
- Preceded by: Leon Mizrachi
- Succeeded by: A. L. Zissu
- In office May 1, 1946 – May 30, 1948
- Preceded by: Bernard Rohrlich
- Succeeded by: triumvirate: Chaim Kraft, Sami Iakerkaner, Simon "Shmuel" Zalman

Personal details
- Born: July 1, 1902 Craiova, Kingdom of Romania
- Died: 1977 (aged 74–75) Israel
- Other political affiliations: Jewish National Party (1930); Zionist Democratic Group Klal (1944)
- Spouse: Suzana Mărculescu
- Profession: Lawyer, accountant
- Nickname: Moshe

Military service
- Allegiance: Kingdom of Romania
- Branch/service: Romanian Land Forces
- Years of service: 1924, 1939–1940
- Rank: Sublieutenant

Mișu Benvenisti, also known as Mishu or Moshe Benvenisti, sometimes Benveniste (Hebrew: מישו בנבנישתי; July 1, 1902 – 1977), was a Romanian-Israeli lawyer, Zionist militant, and leader of the Romanian Jewish community. Born into a family of printers and publishers, he was one of the few Sephardi Jews to reach prominence in political life during the Romanian Kingdom era. His association with Zionism began in his teenage years, and saw him emerging as leader of the Zionist Youth Organization (part of the HeHalutz, HH) in the early 1920s. Benvenisti was then primarily affiliated with the Renașterea Noastră group in Bucharest, joining the small Jewish National Party by 1930; through these, he participated in the formation of a nation-wide Jewish Party (PER), wherein he was youth organizer and general secretary. After 1936, he was also a member of the Romanian office of the World Jewish Congress (WJC), serving as its lawyer and as a rapporteur on the growth of local antisemitism.

During the late 1930s, Romania drew closer to Nazi Germany and gradually introduced discrimination against Jews; the National Renaissance Front banned the PER, along with all other Romanian political parties, in early 1938. Zionists were allowed to form non-political bodies, which encouraged a wave of emigrations into Mandatory Palestine. As Nazi pressures increased with the arrival in power of Ion Antonescu, Benvenisti considered emigrating, but accepted appointment as chairman of the Zionist Executive. His political line there was one of moderation: he expressed loyalty toward Romania and increased control over the rebellious HH, intervening as a negotiator between the regime and the Jewish community. His stance was criticized by Jews on the right, including A. L. Zissu, as a form of collaborationism, especially due to his contacts with the submissive Central Jewish Office.

Faced with the Holocaust occurring on Romania's borders, Benvenisti also cultivated the Jewish resistance—in particular by helping Hungarian, Slovak and Polish Jews find temporary shelter in Romania, or by assisting survivors of Antonescu's own deportations to Transnistria. Benvenisti and other Jewish leaders persuaded the Antonescu government to relax pressures on the Jews, though the Executive also had to agree to collect large sums as contributions and bribes. The Romanian Zionists' role in sabotaging the Holocaust was documented by the local Judenberater, Gustav Richter. As a result of his investigations, Romanian authorities reluctantly arrested Benvenisti in January 1944. He was released in March, by which time he had lost the confidence of his peers, being replaced at the head of the Executive by his rival Zissu. For the rest of 1944, Benvenisti presided upon his own splinter party, the Zionist Democratic Group Klal.

Antonescu's downfall in August 1944 revived Romania's multi-party regime; consequently, Zissu and Benvenisti returned as factional leaders of the PER, with the former holding the party chairmanship. Benvenisti was moving toward the Jewish left, and embracing cooperation with the Romanian Communist Party and the Jewish Democratic Committee (CDE). In mid-1946, he replaced the anti-communist Zissu as president of both the WJC chapter and the PER, drawing the latter into an alliance with the CDE before the November elections. With the communists' turn to anti-Zionism, Benvenisti shut down the PER, criticized illegal emigration, and took political advice from CDE cadres such as Bercu Feldman. When the Romanian communist regime took over on the last days of 1947, he ended his Zionist involvement, though he and his wife Suzana still applied for emigration to Israel. Benvenisti was arrested in 1950 by the Securitate, tortured into confessing that he was a spy for Israel, and appeared at a show trial, alongside Zissu, in 1954. He was sentenced to life imprisonment, but later freed and allowed to settle in Israel, which became his home for the final two decades of his life.

== Biography ==
=== Early life and career ===
The Benvenistis belonged to the Sephardi minority (Romanian: evrei sefarzi or evrei spanioli) within the larger Jewish community. They were first noted locally for their contribution in publishing: in 1876, two family members, Sandu and David, created Frații Benvenisti—a major Jewish printing press, centered on Craiova city. Memoirist Mariu Theodorian-Carada recalled in 1938 that "Benvenisti the elder was the only Craiova Jew to wear a fur-lined caftan". Mișu was born to Simon Benvenisti and Ernestina Schlanger on July 1, 1902. His maternal grandfather, Adolf Schlanger, was Romania's oldest traveling salesman at the time of his death in December 1906. Mișu's father, who lived between 1870 and 1943, had worked for Frații Benvenisti library and then for Editura Alcalay company, until establishing his own editorial imprint, Editura Ancora. He was highly respected in the Romanian literary community, and noted especially for his role in promoting figures such as Eugen Lovinescu, George Bacovia, and Liviu Rebreanu. In 1922, Simon was sponsoring an annual Benvenisti Prize, awarded by the Romanian Writers' Society to debuting poets. His elder son Felix preserved the family tradition as director of Bicurim publishers; born in Bucharest in 1900, Felix was working as a clerk during the 1950s. Maternal cousins of Felix and Mișu included Dolfi Urseanu, who worked at the State Opera Theater.

By his own account, Mișu was a native Craiovan, and a graduate of Carol I National College. As the second-born son, was primarily interested in the legal profession and politics. In 1918 or 1919, soon after hearing about the Balfour Declaration, and influenced by his colleague Carol Singer, he joined a Zionist youth group called Hatalmid. He served as its president in 1919–1920, during which time he was acquainted with more senior Zionist figures, including activist Leon Mizrachi, Mișu Weissman, and Chief Rabbi Jacob Itzhak Niemirower. In 1920, while studying law at the University of Bucharest, he was recruited by the Jewish students' organization, Hașmonea, and, on Mizrachi's proposal, was elected chairman of the Zionist Youth Organization of Romania (1923–1924). This period saw him involved in at least one scuffle with antisemitic colleagues: on January 31, 1923, they tried to prevent Benvenisti and Samuel Steinberg from hearing a lecture by Mircea Djuvara; "other Jewish students arrived in" to assist, after which the two groups fought each other, leaving three Jews and one Romanian slightly injured. His brother, meanwhile, had embraced anti-Zionism, joining the Association of Romanian Jews in Brăila, which declared itself in favor of complete Jewish assimilation.

In 1925, Mișu Benvenisti joined Cornel Iancu's new Zionist lodge, Renașterea Noastră ("Our Rebirth"), where he remained an active member until the early months of 1944. A hostile A. L. Zissu recalled in 1951: "All that I now when it comes to Benvenisti's political activity in the interwar is that he was a very active member of the Zionist group Renașterea, and very ambitious about rapidly acquiring offices, ahead of those who were older and more committed, that he was extremely conceited about his own political genius, going as far as to imagine himself a predestined leader." Benvenisti graduated in 1924. After completing a one-year mandatory term in the Romanian Land Forces (at Timișoara), he registered with the bar association in Ilfov County. He was also involved in business ventures by 1926, when he joined Grigore Trancu-Iași in founding a paper-distributing company named after Costache Negri. In early 1928, he was providing legal services for Renașterea Noastră, with Moți (Motti) Moscovici as his secretary. Moscovici recounts that, in 1928–1929, Benvenisti also went on a study trip to Paris, where he intended to become a Doctor of Law: "He was absent for about a year, but never graduated."

In July 1929, Benvenisti and I. Schechter were among the 15 delegates of the Romanian Jewry to the Sixteenth Zionist Congress in Zürich. They were also the only two Romanians to have been elected by "radical" Zionist lodges, against a "centrist" mainstream. By August 1929, Benvenisti had returned to Bucharest. The Jewish members of Parliament, who had since established an ethnic club, elected him to represent them at a Tomis Hall meeting protesting the anti-Jewish incidents in Mandatory Palestine; by 1930, he was officially the Jewish club secretary. In November, he challenged a clerk, Ștefan Iacobescu, to duel him on Luterană Street (Iacobescu never showed up). Benvenisti's major client as a lawyer was the firm Frații Buhler, a Swiss–Romanian importer of grinding machines. This job initially provided him with "modest revenue" that, from about 1932, he was forced to share with his gravely ill father. Around 1932, he met and fell in love with the seven-years-younger bank clerk Suzana Mărculescu, but could not live with her full-time, as both had to attend to their ailing parents. According to his recollections, she did not share his Zionist ideals, and maintained "irony and regret for the time and energy I spent on matters such as politics". They were only wed under Jewish law in May 1944—making Benvenisti cousins by marriage with composer Ricu Mălineanu and with singer Mara Ianoli-Mălineanu.

=== PER creation ===
Zionist allegory of youth in uniform, for a Romanian-language pamphlet, Program de Mosava (1933)

By March 1930, Benvenisti and Sami Stern had joined a Bucharest-based Jewish National Party, inspired by the views of Adolphe Stern. In speeches he made at the time, he noted that the group's existence was not directed "against the Romanian parties, but against all organizations which trample upon the Jewish population's needs." In August, shortly after the Sighet Jewish Temple had been set ablaze, the "General Council of Romanian Jews" delegated him to the Ministry of Internal Affairs, where he demanded details on the investigation. The same month, with local elections held in Bucharest, he submitted his candidacy on the "Jewish group" list for Bucharest Sector II (Black), second on that list after Sami Stern.

Benvenisti subsequently affiliated with Tivadar Fischer's nationwide Jewish Party (PER). In the parliamentary election of June 1931, he unsuccessfully contested two seats in the Assembly of Deputies—holding the last place on the PER's Ilfov list, and the first place in Tutova County. He was voted in as leader of the Sector II chapter on September 8, 1932. Benvenisti set up the PER youth branch (Tineretul Partidului Evreiesc) in 1934; the same year, he was also appointed the general secretary of the party at large. He was seconded at the youth section by Sami Iakerkaner, and had Jean Cohen among his subordinates. Moscovici nominates him as the PER's major electoral agent and propagandist. Historian Valeriu-Alexandru Moraru notes that Benvenisti and Cohen were the only two Sephardi men to be active in the PER; according to Moraru, the two, alongside M. Leon of the rival Union of Romanian Jews (UER), were also the only three Sephardim active in Romanian Jewish politics at any level.

Benvenisti was a perennial candidate for parliamentary seats throughout the interwar. During the general elections of December 1933, he ran in two Bessarabian constituencies—Bălți and Orhei. The lists, respectively headlined by Rahmil Ioffe and Michel Landau, only took small percentages of the vote—6% in Bălți, and 1% in Orhei. He also ran second after Mayer Ebner in Suceava County, sharing in the 3.7% result; and third, after Tivadar Fischer and Alexandru Nobel, on the list for Rădăuți County, which took 3.8%. As part of his efforts, Benvenisti also went on national conference tours, and, while in Turnu Severin, met a future Zionist doctrinaire, Theodor Loewenstein-Lavi. Those years brought him into contact with the World Zionist Organization (WZO), allowing him to greet Nahum Goldmann and Nahum Sokolow on their respective visits to Romania. Benvenisti notes that the WZO's Romanian delegate Sami Singer, who was following the Nazi takeover in Weimar Germany, asked him to become a rapporteur on Romania's own "antisemitic currents". On May 7, 1935, he spoke at the Sephardi Community House in Bucharest about the plight of Jews under the Nazi regime.

On January 29, 1936, Benvenisti was one of five party representatives who signed into existence the PER–UER alliance. Called Central Council of Romanian Jews, it existed for the "defence of all rights and liberties of a general character of the Jews who are Roumanian citizens or subjects, within the framework of the Constitution and of the Laws of the Country." In May of that year, Renașterea Noastră's eponymous newspaper carried an article by Benvenisti which made him an official enemy of Germany, for celebrating the boycott of Nazi business and for condemning German rearmament. In late 1936 or early 1937, both Cohen and Benvenisti were recruited by the Romanian Committee of World Jewish Congress (WJC), serving under Sami Singer and Sami Stern. His was a salaried position, and included acting as WJC corporate lawyer.

Benvenisti was elected the PER's vice president in 1936. During the parliamentary election of December 1937, the PER ran as an informal ally of the National Peasants' Party (PNȚ), despite the latter having a non-aggression pact with the fascist Iron Guard. The arrangements were made by Tivadar Fischer but approved by other PER men. They included Benvenisti, who later reflected on his contribution as having been a "great mistake." He and Francisc Jambor headlined the PER list for the Assembly in Roman County, which only took 2% of the vote; Benvenisti also had an eligible second position in Hotin County (3% of the vote) and Soroca County (4%), as well as the third position in Storojineț (5%).

=== War begins ===
The advent of antisemitism after the election marginalized both assimilated and Zionist Jews. On March 30, 1938, a dictatorial regime formed around King Carol II banned the PER, later setting up its single official party, or National Renaissance Front (FRN). Carol still allowed Jews to organize for emigration into Palestine (Aliyah Bet). In 1939, shortly before the start of World War II, Benvenisti was again called under arms, serving to 1940 as a Sublieutenant and regimental paymaster. He was still informed in community affairs, supporting Alexandru Șafran's election as Chief Rabbi of Romania in late 1939. As part of its expansion of antisemitic laws, the government debarred Benvenisti. A review board under Coty Stoicescu found that his claim for a legal exemption was groundless, upholding his debarment in early September 1940; this remained his status until reinstatement in 1944. The emigration effort, meanwhile, was organized through a Zionist Executive, which survived the FRN's downfall. During late September 1940, Romania emerged as an ally of the Axis countries; Ion Antonescu took over government, as Romania's Conducător, and, initially, as a senior partner of the Iron Guard. The latter was expelled from government in January 1941, following a Guardist revolt and anti-Jewish pogrom. According to Moscovici, Benvenisti was in Bucharest shortly after these events, frantically preparing his own escape to Palestine, and upset by the lengthy approval process. In March or April,

Benvenisti was made leader of the Zionist Executive—which coordinated Renașterea Noastră and other organizations. He took over from Mizrachi, who had actually managed to obtain a Palestine visa. This assignment put Benvenisti in direct contact with the Istanbul branch of the Jewish Agency for Israel and its representatives Mayer Segall and Haim Barlas, who successively handled the emigration project in Romania. On May 17, the Executive received its legal recognition from the Siguranța police, allowing it to be formally joined in May by factions such as Tnuat HaMizrahi and Ihud. Allegedly, Romanian recognition was granted only after General Emanoil Leoveanu, as head of the Siguranța, had Litman appointed as Moscovici's second-in-command; the allegation is that Litman was trusted by Leoveanu's clique. According to Zissu, Benvenisti's claim to chairmanship was still questionable: Mizrachi had allegedly delegated his duties by phone. This is contracted by a Siguranța reports, which notes that Mizrachi, "disgusted" by Romanian politics, announced his departure and delegation of powers with an "impressive session" of the Zionist movement. According to Cohen, Mizrachi had recommended his friend as "the most capable of solving what was then a most delicate problem, namely disciplining youth and coordinating its activities."

June 1941 witnessed the onset of Operation Barbarossa, which saw Romania waging war on the Soviet Union as a German ally. According to Cohen, many in the Executive, including Benvenisti, Iancu and himself, as well as M. H. Maxy, Moscovici, Tully Rosenthal and Iosif Ebercohn, supported Romania's war effort. Renașterea Noastră published an article by Leon B. Wexler which celebrated the recovery of Bessarabia as a victory for Romanian nationalism. Despite such displays of loyalism, pressures on Jews were again increased—a Transnistria Governorate, established in former Soviet territory, became a target of deportation and selective killing for Bessarabian Jews, as well as for some groups of Jews in Romania-proper. Benvenisti and fellow Zionist Executive man Cornel Iancu joined the Assistance Committee presided upon by Arnold Schwefelberg, which offered some relief to survivors of Transnistrian marches. He also organized relief for survivors of the Iași pogrom who were stranded at Călărași—alongside fellow Zionists Abraham Feller, Iacov Litman, and Lazăr Wurmbrand, he oversaw a fundraiser for this group.

Benvenisti once explained the Executive as having limited power over adherents: "The independence of groups, be they adult or junior, was strict and absolute, without there being any possibility of intrusion by any of the Executive leaders." He spoke of his main activities at the Executive as including "the preparation of youth for emigration, as well as cultural activity". In line with promises made to Mizrachi, he stepped in to discipline the Zionist youth, or HeHalutz (HH), and, Moscovici notes, was the first-ever Zionist leader to manage this task. Soon after taking over, he had discovered a postcard which showed that the group had convened a national conference "without telling him about it and without the necessary authorization." Benvenisti was infuriated, particularly since this could make him a suspect in Siguranța's eyes. He reformed the HH into a single structure, and set up the first Hebrew-language school, Tarbuth. Poldi Filderman was tasked with overseeing its day-to-day administration, while Iancu and Loewenstein-Lavi directed the education efforts.

=== Against Richter ===
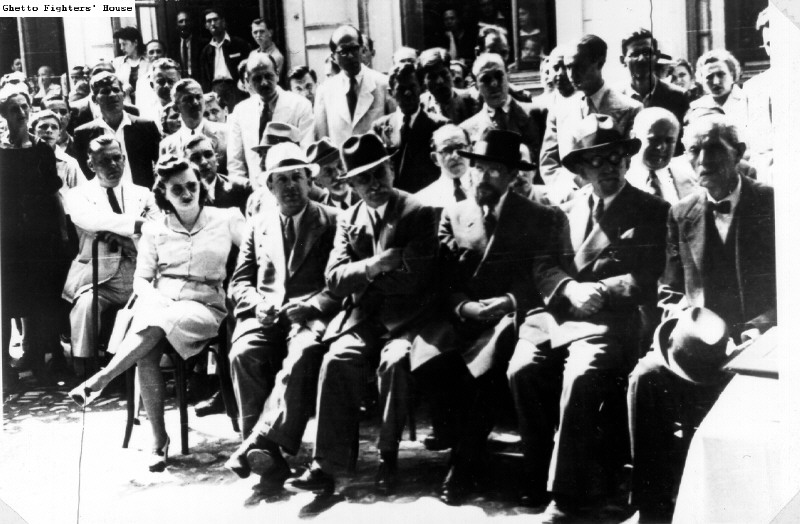
Lag BaOmer celebration at the Jewish community center in Bucharest, May 1942. Central Jewish Office's Henric Streitman is seated in the middle, flanked by the bearded Chief Rabbi Alexandru Șafran and Theodor Loewenstein-Lavi

In January 1942, Antonescu's government formed a state-controlled Central Jewish Office, which nominally supplanted the Zionist Executive; its direct overseer was a non-Jewish Commissioner, Radu Lecca. Bevenisti was immediately inducted as its regional leader in Ilfov. He resigned on the spot, but accepted a parallel appointment to the Office's Transnistrian relief committee on Calea Moșilor (until being sacked later in 1942). He and his colleagues rejected the implicit outlawing of their Zionist organization, and sought remedial action. As he recounts, Romanian authorities were sympathetic to such demands, but noted that the matter was of direct interest to the Nazi agency in Romania; consequently, Benvenisti and Iancu visited with the local Judenberater, Gustav Richter. Richter reportedly informed his guests that Germany was allied with the Palestinian Arabs, and that Jews could only hope for another "area of land outside Europe", allocated to them by Adolf Hitler. In the meantime, they were to "consider Zionist activity in Romania as finished". Benvenisti and Iancu pleaded with Lecca, informing him that a ban would push Zionism into active resistance against Antonescu. Lecca reviewed their arguments and decided to override Richter, renewing the organizational permits. Together with Chief Rabbi Șafran and Zalman Rabinsohn, he also persuaded Romanian authorities to allow Sabbath worship in Jewish schools.

Benvenisti's policy drew immediate criticism in the Jewish community. When, in May 1942, he asked that all Zionist groups adhere to his political line, those left in the minority complained about his "autocratic attitude". Cohen was among the dissenters, angered that Benvenisti had scaled down emigration and was working on it only with a highly corrupt Greek freighter, Yannos Pandelis. Zissu maintained that Benvenisti was guilty of "collaboration", especially by allowing Loewenstein-Lavi to serve on the board of the Central Jewish Office. He resented Benvenisti for cultivating former UER head Wilhelm Filderman, despite Filderman being a Jewish assimilationist: "[his] politics were categorically opposed to the national policy". This notion was rejected by Benvenisti, who argued that, at any point during the war, Filderman spoke in favor of "mass emigration". In various contexts, Benvenisti was also adamant that he never allowed his Zionist group to be either collaborative or usable by the Antonescu regime. Lavi's role, he claimed, was in "sabotaging" Richter's attempts at complete racial segregation (an interpretation which was supported by Moscovici). He admitted to having assisted his own brother in securing unpaid employment at the Central Jewish Office, which helped Felix with fulfilling the requirements to be spared from his forced labor duties.

While reviewing his own activities, Benvenisti described at some length his contribution to rescuing Hungarian, Slovak, and Polish Jews escaping the Holocaust in Europe. He notes that he participated in covering up the details of these operations: though officially presented as "500 families" largely comprising children, the refugees were in fact mostly young men and women. In order to accomplish this task, he contacted General Leoveanu, who permitted that the refugees sail out of Constanța Harbor. Benvenisti made a point of preserving links with Jewish groups in southern Transylvania (the region's northern half having been ceded to Hungary). He visited these constituencies on two occasions, in mid-1942 and mid-1943, and claimed to have blocked Romanian authorities from staging a "judicial farce" that would have resulted in the prosecution of Transylvanian Zionists. Moscovici, who renders an account by Itzhak Herzig "Artzi", suggests that Benvenisti's on Popa Petre Street 42 (in Bucharest's Armenian Quarter) was always "packed full with Zionist eminences and youth leaders", who presented Benvenisti with topical reports.

According to his own reports, Benvenisti once overheard Lecca's conversations, becoming the first person to record his approval for the mass deportation of 40,000 Transylvanian and Banatian Jews to Nazi extermination camps; he also notes his and Carol Reiter's role in stopping "this new monstrosity", by appealing to Antonescu himself. Similarly, Benvenisti and Wilhelm Filderman also persuaded Lecca not to detain Polish Jews who were transiting Romania: "[we showed that] our country's prestige was going to be even more tarnished, given the interest of foreign countries in the plight of these Polish citizens." He recounts his contribution to a concentrated effort by the "informal Jewish leaders", whereby they prevented the authorities of Cernăuți from expelling Jewish refugees back into the General Government. Such activities were angrily reviewed by Richter. On August 8, 1942, Bukarester Tagblatt published Richter's piece exposing Zionist activities, which also alleged that Benvenisti was an English spy. The Zionist Executive had been formally outlawed on August 7 by Romanian authorities answering to Richter's requests, but continued to meet in conspiratorial secrecy.

In autumn 1942, Lecca and the Central Jewish Office informed Zionist leaders that they were expected to cover Romania's wartime expenses with a major loan. According to Benvenisti, he tried to oppose the measure, noting that "its realization would be impossible". He also claimed to have been threatened with deportation to Transnistria for either himself or the Jews as a whole; researchers Teodor Wexler and Mihaela Popov view this version of events as truthful. At the time, Wilhelm Filderman was singled out as a "saboteur" of the war effort by Lecca, for having sought to block the loan. Benvenisti and Rabbi Șafran stood by Filderman, and, as Benvenisti notes, expected to persuade Antonescu himself to rescind the order. Instead, their opposition resulted in Filderman's deportation to a Transnistrian camp, at Moghilău. Benvenisti's name was found on a document which agreed to furnish the loan—however, he claimed to have no recollection of signing it. Moscovici alleged that Benvenisti personally handled collection, and that he coerced the "masses of Jewish laborers" into contributing. Himself a "loan inspector" in that context, Cohen attests that Benvenisti gave directives to postpone payments as much as possible. In April 1943, the Executive leader was included on a list of Jewish hostages who had to account for their whereabouts with the authorities—in his case, those of Bucharest's 2nd Police Precinct, who recorded his residence as still being on Popa Petre.

=== 1944 arrest ===
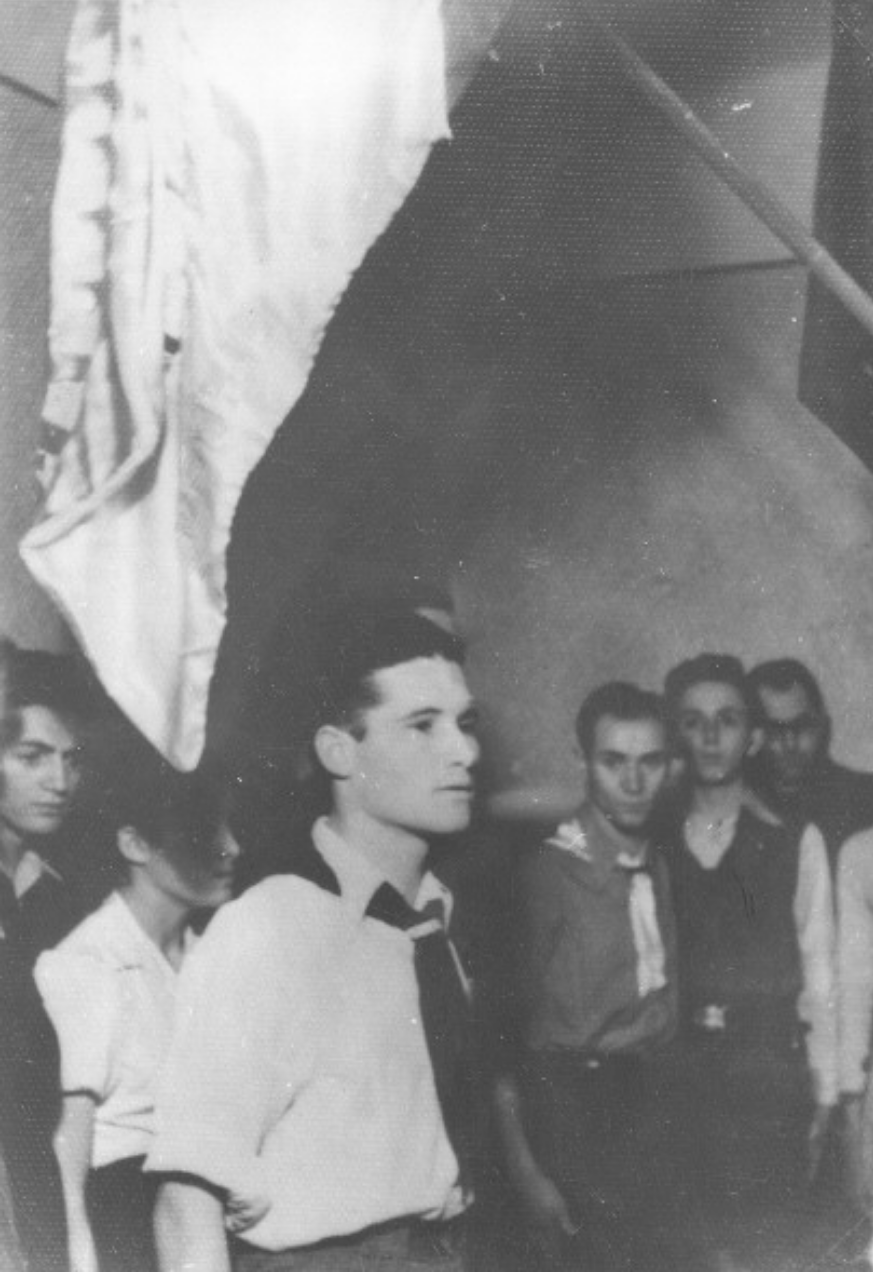
Roll call of the HeHalutz in Bucharest, 1941

The Zionist Executive dissolved itself in summer 1943—according to Zissu, this was a public embarrassment, resulting from corrupt deals made by Shlomo Entzer at the Palestine Office, under Benvenisti's watch. Benvenisti contrarily reports that he was always critical of Entzer's focus on prioritizing "rich children" for places on outbound ships. In mid-1943, after an intercession by Romanian doctor Bazil Teodorescu, Benvenisti and Filderman obtained an audience with Deputy Premier Mihai Antonescu. Upon meeting him, they asked for urgent humanitarian measures to redress the Romanian Jews' precarious situation. Their host promised to curb the Transnistrian experiment, and to repatriate its survivors; he also expressed approval for mass emigration into Palestine, and guaranteed that he would contact the governments of Germany and Bulgaria "so that no obstacles would be posed to an emigration that the Romanian government also supported."

Over the next months, Benvenisti prepared 75 children for "overland emigration" by rail. His effort was curbed by the Bulgarian authorities, who cancelled the group's transit visas. With Filderman and Carol Iancu, he also approached the smuggler Arthur Tester, who informed that that he was the only one capable of bypassing Bulgarian opposition. Tester asked that they pay him 2,500 lei per child rescued. Benvenisti and Filderman also kept contacts with the semi-legal opposition, represented in the main by the PNȚ. They met with PNȚ leaders Iuliu Maniu and Ghiță Popp, who promised to assist them with preventing the deportation of Bukovina Jews, as well as with asking Antonescu's men to improve the living conditions of those already held in Vapniarka and Grosulovo. Accompanied by Iancu's wife Mella, he also visited Dinu Brătianu of the National Liberal Party. Though noting that he could not hope to persuade the Conducător to improve on his antisemitic record, Brătianu put Benvenisti in contact with his party colleague Ion Costinescu, who was presiding over the Romanian Red Cross and who "undertook the most energetic efforts toward [the deportees'] repatriation."

Benvenisti believes that, throughout 1943, Richter had remained on his trail. In mid-1942, the chairman of the Central Jewish Office (namely, Henric Streitman) "though it best to warn me that it would be best for me to leave for Palestine, to save myself, while assuring me that I would get my permit to leave from the Romanian government." As noted by historian Dennis Deletant, his name surface during an investigation of Zionist escape routes by the German Foreign Ministry, which "passed this information on to the Romanian authorities as evidence of 'hostile' activities"; Siguranța and Gestapo agents chanced upon letters and receipts which implicated Benvenisti in illegal acts, resulting in his arrest on January 30, 1944. Together with Fischer and Jacques Rosenzweig, he appeared before the Bucharest Tribunal, specifically charged with aiding and abetting Polish Jews in Cernăuți. He was held at the Police Prefecture, where, he claims, the Gestapo became directly involved in securing his indictment. Likewise, "Lecca and Richter [...] came by once a day [...], asking for new arrests to be made and compiling grounds for accusations against us."

Benvenisti was ultimately released in early March 1944, after Wilhelm Filderman and the Swiss ambassador, René de Weck, had vouched for him. Mella Iancu recounts that she was also involved in bribing Siguranța Commissioner Albert Rădulescu with hundreds of thousands of lei from Zionist Executive coffers, which, she claims, contributed to his leniency on that specific matter. In his official notes, Rădulescu asserted that neither Benvenisti nor his Zionist colleagues posed any danger for Romania's internal order. Benvenisti himself credited his success to his defense team, which comprised Doru Gherson and S. Hart, to Filderman and Zissu, as well as to "the most progressive left-wing circles"—the trial, he maintained, was one of "racial persecution". This account is partly contradicted by Moscovici, who argues that Zissu was entirely opposed to bailing out his adversary. Officially, he and all the other defendants received six-month sentences, but their time in confinement was reduced. Bevenisti complained that his "five-weeks detention" was "succeeded by month upon month of me being tormented with harassment and threats".

=== HeHalutz trial and marginalization ===
Zissu reports that, in the resulting panic following the arrests, Renașterea wanted Benvenisti stripped of any decision-making powers, for which reason Zissu himself was made president of a new, but unrecognized, Zionist Executive. This is partly contradicted by Benvenisti's account, which notes that he willingly resigned "by the end of 1943, or by the start of 1944", or "not long after my liberation". He took this decision when a group of Romanian and Palestinian Zionists (including Zissu, Entzer, Barlas and Moritz Geiger) expressed their wish to defy the British caps on immigration by fitting illegal transports of Jews. From the moment of his release to April 1946, Benvenisti was largely absent from the Zionist Executive—though he accepted invitations to attend meetings chaired by Zissu, and spoke there on several occasions. He was instead elected chairman of a more centrist political party, the Zionist Democratic Group Klal, which had also rejected Zissu's policies.

The period also saw a round-up of the HH by Romanian authorities. As reported by Benvenisti, the Zionist youth had drawn attention to itself in 1942, when members of the Hashomer Hatzair were allegedly caught circulating lei banknotes marked Jos războiul! ("Down with war!") or Afară cu nemții! ("Out with the Kraut!"). They were indicted for "communist activities"; in similar vein, Gordonia youths were prosecuted for assisting in the emigration effort. Before being himself arrested, Benvenisti had been approached by Gherș Tabacinic-Sunea and two other young Zionists, who had allegedly asked him to bribe Romanian policemen handling the case. He also appeared as a defense witness in both trials, which took place in April–May 1944. He argued there that all communist propaganda found with the HH was purely for informative purposes, and that Gordonia had official approval for its actions. The Tribunal asked for him to repeat his plea, which "was unheard of" in judicial annals. This apparent show of clemency was overturned by the final verdict, which passed harsh sentences on all defendants, including the 12-years-old Bianca Calmy; three HH boys were sentenced to death and subsequently executed. All survivors were pardoned in early 1944 by King Michael I.

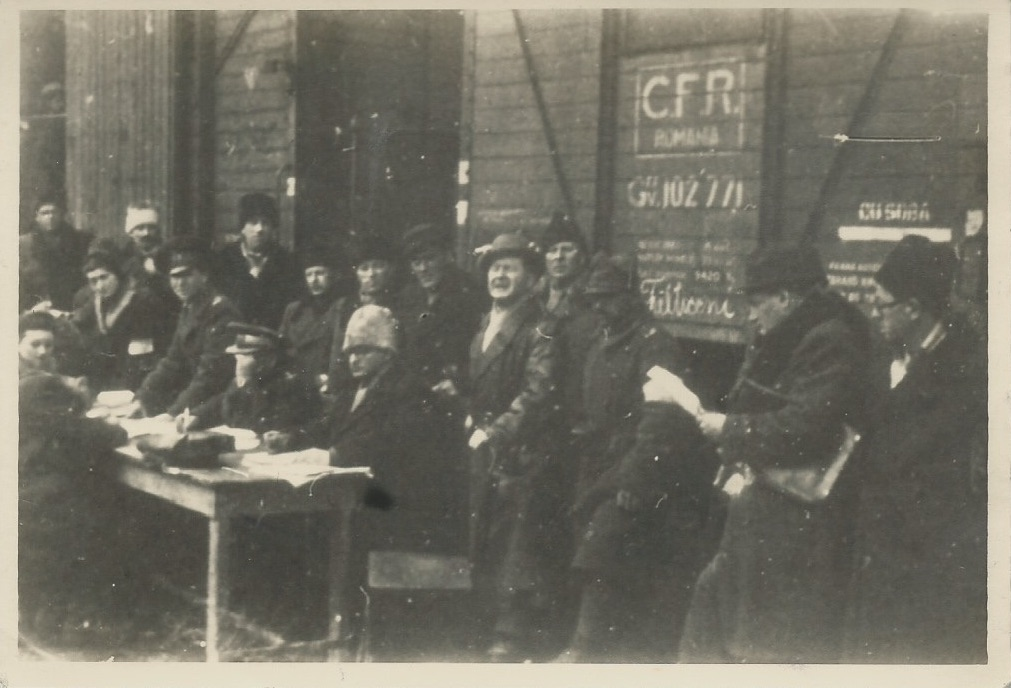
Roundup of Jewish orphans upon their release from Transnistria Governorate, 1944

Together with Wilhelm Fischer, Benvenisti continued to organize the relief effort for Jewish deportees in Transnistria: "I was the one providing exact instructions for the HeHalutz personnel who went on illegal trips into Transnistria to provide aid and to attempt the rescue of people wherever this was feasible." However, "once my persecution by Richter became more acute, I was removed from the assistance commission, on his express order. [...] Thanks to the continuous interventions I made with the Central [Jewish Office], Zionist representatives were finally accepted on the commissions that had left for Transnistria, which were presided upon by Mr Fred Șaraga." By February 1944, Benvenisti, Moscovici and Iancu Scarlat were facing prosecution for an alleged participation in forging papers that exempted Isac Juman and other Jews from their labor duties.

Rabbi Moshe Carmilly-Weinberger, who arrived to Bucharest from Northern Transylvania in early 1944, attested that Benvenisti was among those directly involved in the effort to rescue would-be victims of the Holocaust in Hungary—specifically, they smuggled Hungarian Jews into Romania across the border, and obtained the Antonescus' assurances that the network would be tolerated. Both Zissu and Cohen argue that, in May or June 1944, Benvenisti unwittingly jeopardized a major rescue plan for the Hungarian Jews, when he showed up for direct talks with Lecca and Antonescu, without consulting them and other Jewish leaders. These asked for an "honor jury" of the Zionist Executive to rule on Filderman and Benvenisti's conduct—its members were Șafran, Poldi Filderman, and Leon Ghelerter. He agreed to appear, and testified that he was only present in Antonescu's office to validate Zissu as the person of contact; Zissu himself continued to allege that this was a lie. At the time, however, Zissu also approached Benvenisti during talks to reestablish the PER as an illegal resistance group—negotiations toward this end were held in the Iancus' home.

=== August 1944 coup ===
Throughout the first half of 1944, with Soviet troops on Romania's border, it became apparent that Germany could no longer vouch for Romania's survival as an independent country. After his marriage in May, Benvenisti was preparing to join the Hungarian Jewish exodus by embarking with his family on one of the ships for which Zissu had obtained permission to leave Romania. He informed Mihai Antonescu of this during a second meeting in Teodorescu's home, prompting the latter to ask a favor of him: upon arrival, he was to inform the Western Allies that Romania would surrender, if Britain and the United States agreed to partake in its occupation. The Deputy Premier regarded Soviet occupation as the guarantee of an "exclusively communist regime". Antonescu also wanted the Yishuv to know that the regime had been comparatively lenient toward Jews, and that communism would be detrimental to both communities. Benvenisti gave up on his emigration plan when his mother was diagnosed with a heart condition which made it unlikely that she could survive the journey; he also noted that Suzana was depressed by the thought of leaving Romania.

Benvenisti claims that, on August 22, 1944, government officials rushed him to the Sturdza Palace on Calea Victoriei, asking him to urgently send a message to the "world's Jewish organizations", and, through them, the Churchill war ministry, announcing that Romania was ready to surrender. He reports that he declined, prompting one bureaucrat to comment: "That Mr [Wilhelm] Filderman is more of a patriot than you are." These alleged events were closely followed by the coup of August 23, which deposed the Antonescus and denounced the Axis alliance. From that moment on, Zionists were again allowed to organize in the open. Benvenisti, who had reopened his lawyer's practice in January 1945, from an address on Carol Boulevard, also returned to publishing. He produced an essay detailing his own contribution to Jewish life and Zionist politics during the previous three years. It was published over three issues of Viața Evreească weekly, and then as a booklet. Viața Evreească was a joint venture between Benvenisti and Mendel H. Bady, but did not survive for long.

Like Cohen, Wilhelm Filderman and Zissu, Benvenisti was reassigned a seat on the WJC Romanian Committee. It elected him a local vice president, alongside Schwefelberg, Eduard Manolescu, and Bernard Rohrlich. The PER was soon reestablished; he and Wilhelm Fischer were co-opted by Zissu to serve as its vice presidents. Benvenisti formed a Mixed Judicial Commission, which represented Zionist and non-Zionist parties and organizations, in a common effort to undo the antisemitic legacy and obtain increased rights for Jews. Together with Wilhelm Fischer and Schwefelberg, he presented WJC demands to Gheorghe Vlădescu-Răcoasa, the Romanian Secretary for National Minorities. Cohen places him among the PER group leaders attending a meeting with PNȚ leaders, including Maniu, "around October 1944". The Zionists wanted Maniu's support for overturning all antisemitic legislation; they were largely disappointed, in that Maniu endorsed positive discrimination in favor of the "Romanian element". Also according to Cohen, in May–July 1945 WJC pressed for a merger between the PER and the UER, with Zissu as honorary president, Wilhelm Filderman as active chairman, and Benvenisti as co-chairman.

The 1944–1947 period brought Romania under institutional control by the Romanian Communist Party (PCR), which presented the Zionists with opposition from the left—manifested as the PCR-affiliated Jewish Democratic Committee (CDE). Benvenisti recounts having been approached by the CDE's original cell, formed around M. H. Maxy and Lică (Abramovici) Chiriță, "immediately after August 23". They wanted him to direct "Zionist elements that are thought of as democratic" into an umbrella group. The project stalled until 1945, when he realized that Maxy had established the CDE without consulting him at all. In a report presented by the Committee to the Siguranța on June 22, 1946, both Benvenisti (as "interim president" of the PER) and Zissu (still the WJC branch leader) were described as "centrists". Cohen suspected that Benvenisti embraced the rhetoric of cooperation with "democratic forces" (namely, communism) only for tactical reasons, since he would have known these to be incompatible with the Zionist agenda.

=== Communist turn ===
Benvenisti himself claimed to have embraced a "left-wing orientation [...] from back during the war." This was influenced by his contacts with Mella Iancu, a Labor Zionist, and veered into support for a "people's democracy"; Benvenisti boasted his participation in collecting funds for the International Red Aid. At a March 1945 speech in front of the Zionist group Dor Hadash, he noted that Zionism enjoyed support from the world's "most radically progressive circles", variously including the Communist Party USA and the Soviet trade unions; Zionism, he claimed at the time, would solve the "Jewish Question", leaving "fascist circles" to reveal themselves "for their true, unmasked, self: enemies of democracy, proving that we Jews were but their mere pretext." In February 1946, Benvenisti criticized the Anglo-American Committee of Inquiry, arguing that Palestinian issues could only be solved with Soviet input. He later explained that he viewed the Soviet government as Zionism and Israel's one true ally, since the "Jewish bourgeoisie was never fully committed to creating this state [of Israel]." On May 11, 1946, he was a witness for the prosecution at Mihai Antonescu's trial by the People's Tribunal, where he spoke of deportations in Transnistria as amounting to an "extermination regime", concluding that over 270,000 Jews had been killed under the Antonescus.

On May 1, 1946, Benvenisti had been unanimously elected head of the Zionist Executive, taking over from Rohrlich (who had successfully ousted Zissu in autumn 1945). Under his mandate, the Executive embarked on a conflict with the Revisionist Zionists, whom he declared to be dangerously far-right. On July 23, Benvenisti attended a CDE-coordinated meeting of various groups, which focused on discussing the prospects of "common political action"; he was a representative of the Executive, with the PER represented by Isaia Tumarkin. He was also a delegate at the WJC conferences in Paris (summer 1946), Basel, Karlovy Vary, and Zürich (all 1947). During the first of these, accompanied by the CDE's Maxy, Benvenisti met Mapai's leader David Ben-Gurion and Moshe Sneh of the Haganah. In one account of his meetings, he claims to have only discussed politics with Sneh, telling him of "the gratitude that Jews in Romania feel toward the Soviet Union". As he recalls, he repeated these guidelines at Zürich—when he argued that Romanian Jews had had their problems solved by the new regime, and that mass immigration was no longer desired. According to Benvenisti, his report was heard "with interest" by the likes of Sneh, Eliyahu Dobkin, and Nahum Goldmann. Elsewhere, Benvenisti acknowledges that his contacts with Ben-Gurion and Léon Blum were centered on obtaining help for more emigration to Palestine. Nominally, he was by then a supervisor of the Zionist press department (which consisted largely of wall newspapers and hectographed bulletins), but delegated this business to Moscovici. The latter supported the Jewish revolt in Palestine, which led him to be investigated by the Allied Commission.

On July 7, 1946, the PER had deposed Zissu; a leadership committee took over. It comprised Ebercohn, Wilhelm Fischer, Doctor Harschfeld, Cornel Iancu, Leon Itzacar, Iakerkaner, Edgar Kanner, M. Rapaport, Rohrlich, Leon Rozenberg, Rosenthal, and Tumarkin. After Zissu agreed to relinquish chairmanship on July 21, Benvenisti became interim president, appointing S. Segall as the PER's new secretary. These developments reportedly alarmed Wilhelm Filderman, who asked Cohen to help the Zionist right with resuming control of the PER and curb its infiltration by communism. Zissu discusses Benvenisti's continued Zionism, but views it as entirely in line with the moderate version advanced at the WJC by Chaim Weizmann. He alleges that Cohen and Benvenisti were drawn into an alliance with each other by Zissu's own criticism of Weizmann. He blames them for conspiring to strip him of his editorial position at Mântuirea magazine, which was subsequently assigned to be managed by Cohen. The latter reports that Benvenisti "kept in contact with the CDE and the UER regarding the party's demands [from the Romanian political establishment]". Cohen notes having maintained his own grievances against Benvenisti, which led him to resign from his position as general secretary of WJC Romania in early 1947.

In preparation for the general elections in November 1946, the CDE, UER, and PER established a "Jewish Representation", which ran as a minor ally of the PCR's governing coalition, itself called Bloc of Democratic Parties (BPD). During Benvenisti's visit to Paris, the PER endorsed Rohrlich as its parliamentary candidate—according to Benvenisti's own reading of this event, Rohrlich took the nomination because he was much less friendly toward the CDE than he himself was. Though he resented his colleagues for having upstaged him, he opted to continue as the party chairman. In March 1947, Benvenisti also went public with his critique of BPD Prime Minister Petru Groza, accusing him of tolerating antisemitism and of doing very little towards addressing Jewish grievances. He responded to allegations (denied by Groza) according to which various ministers wanted to make "the solution of the Jewish problem in Rumania conditional upon securing $100,000,000 from American Jews for the relief of non-Jews in the famine area of Rumania". According to Benvenisti: "If there is anybody who must pay a price of reconciliation in Rumania it is not the Jewish people but the Rumanians who partly committed and partly tolerated the crimes against Jews." As the Siguranța reported, his speech saw "participants frantically applauding all points that reflected any grievances of the Jewish population."

=== Zionist ban ===
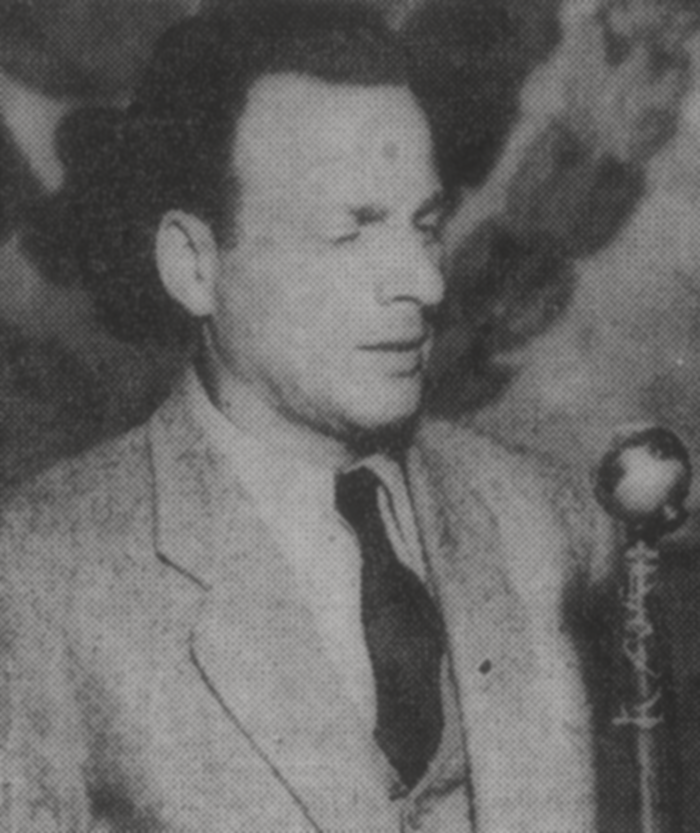
Bercu Feldman in May 1948, at a communist-led rally in support of the Israeli Declaration of Independence

Groza met with Benvenisti on several occasions, when he repeated reassurances that he would not stand in the way of emigration. As reported by Rabbi Șafran, in April Benvenisti intervened to ask Wilhelm Filderman not to speak at a Zionist rally; shortly after, Filderman defected from Romania, having been informed of his pending arrest. Benvenisti and Șafran now met each other daily, with the former showing himself to be a "pragmatic psyche, ready to adapt himself to the new realities." The final days of 1947 saw the PCR and the BPD reestablishing Romania as a communist republic. Benvenisti spoke of the PER as having been voluntarily dissolved at some point in 1947, after talks between himself and CDE man Bercu Feldman. He declared himself opposed to the Zionist Executive's involvement in organizing illegal transports of Jews to Palestine, citing cases in which refugees became victims of human-trafficking cartels and gangs of robbers; he also argued that many Jews could do better in Romanian society than as "pensioners" of The Joint. He recalled that he once denounced Ihud members for tolerating clandestine emigration cells, which the party was then forced to purge out of its ranks. During the legislative election of March 1948, he "supported the election of regime-backed candidates in speeches, articles, and manifestos."

Benvenisti resigned from the Executive on May 30, 1948, leaving it to elect a new leadership. On that occasion, he had attempted to get the Romanian Zionists to express support for collaboration between all Zionist groups and the Maki (Israel's communist party). As Moscovici notes, he was pushed out by the Mishmar faction, who, while espousing a left-wing agenda, was also interested in speeding up mass emigration for Jewish workers. Winning backing from Ihud, they imposed a triumvirate presidency: Iakerkaner, Chaim Kraft, and Simon "Shmuel" Zalman. Benvenisti continued to be engaged with the Zionist circles months after that date, and endorsed the notion that a "small number" of Jews could still leave Romania. He looked forward to joining them to "work for the progressive idea" in Israel, expecting that he would be welcomed into Maki ranks. He had filed a request to emigrate shortly before his resignation.

Benvenisti and Isaia Tumarkin still represented the Romanian Jews at the WJC Congress in Montreux (June–July 1948)—they were given approval to leave after first agreeing to be joined there by nine CDE men, including Feldman. News of this agreement infuriated Zissu; he accused Benvenisti of "national treason". He alleged that the CDE wished to spy on the WJC for his communist patrons, or, alternatively, that it was interested in forcing Montreux delegates to take a pro- or anti-communist position, which would have compromised the Romanian movement. Both Benvenisti and the other WJC Committee members were reportedly in agreement that it was "too late" for the nine delegates to be disinvited. Zissu claims that, upon returning from Montreux, Benvenisti declared his delegation to have been "the most important and most subtle political act I ever undertook." Benvenisti himself recalled that his speech at Montreux was about how "we [the Jews] must stand with the Soviet Union alongside the people's democracies. [...] the Jewish people must reshape its life into a system of productive labor, alongside the Soviet Union." He reportedly directed the WJC's left-wing in boycotting the American delegation, since it included no Jewish communists.

In August 1948, Benvenisti had been removed and, upon appealing, reaccepted into the republican bar association. At some point in late 1948, Romania's Minister of Internal Affairs, Teohari Georgescu, informed Jewish allies, including Benvenisti, of his decision to ban all Zionist groups. In their face-to-face meeting, Georgescu reportedly spoke of Zionists, and especially the HH, as a nuisance which "prevents the people from fitting into society". In subsequent interrogations, Benvenisti claimed have personally engaged the HeHalutz in order to dismantle their provincial networks, receiving some assistance from Feldman. The period saw a first wave of repression by the new secret police, called Securitate. Interrogated by the latter in 1952, Cohen confessed that Benvenisti helped Zionist prisoners by appealing to members of the PNȚ underground, namely Gheorghe Zane and Emil Hațieganu. In similar circumstances, Benvenisti himself noted that he had maintained only "very vague and very infrequent" relations with Zionist activists after their movement had come to be repressed.

Benvenisti took pride in observing that the WJC maintained a presence in Romania until June 1950, despite having been chased almost entirely out of the Eastern Bloc. According to Benvenisti, the decision to maintain it in place was taken between himself and Feldman, much to the chagrin of the Israeli Ambassador, Reuven Rubin. He served as WJC chapter president throughout the interval, with Litman as his second-in-command. Moscovici argues that Benvenisti and Feldman hoped to attract communist Jews into that organization, which, in reality, was "a simple bureau, employing 2 or 3 clerks." Benvenisti recalled making a single visit to the Israeli Embassy in Bucharest, on Independence Day 1949; here, he conversed with Rubin and his counsel Moshe Averbuch Agamy, informing them of his objections "as to how the Israeli government has oriented itself". He also met with Rubin and Averbuch Agamy on another occasion "early in 1949", reportedly to inform them that the Romanian state was right to be fully compensated by the Jewish National Fund. He speculated that achieving this would result in the liberation of Zionist political prisoners, including Leon Itzacar. Zissu similarly confirmed that his rival was not involved in the anti-regime underground, though he passed on messages from Zissu to Rubin's subordinate Eliezer Halevy. Also according to Zissu, Benvenisti was tutoring Halevy's children and his dentist Wrankel in Hebrew.

=== Communist arrest ===
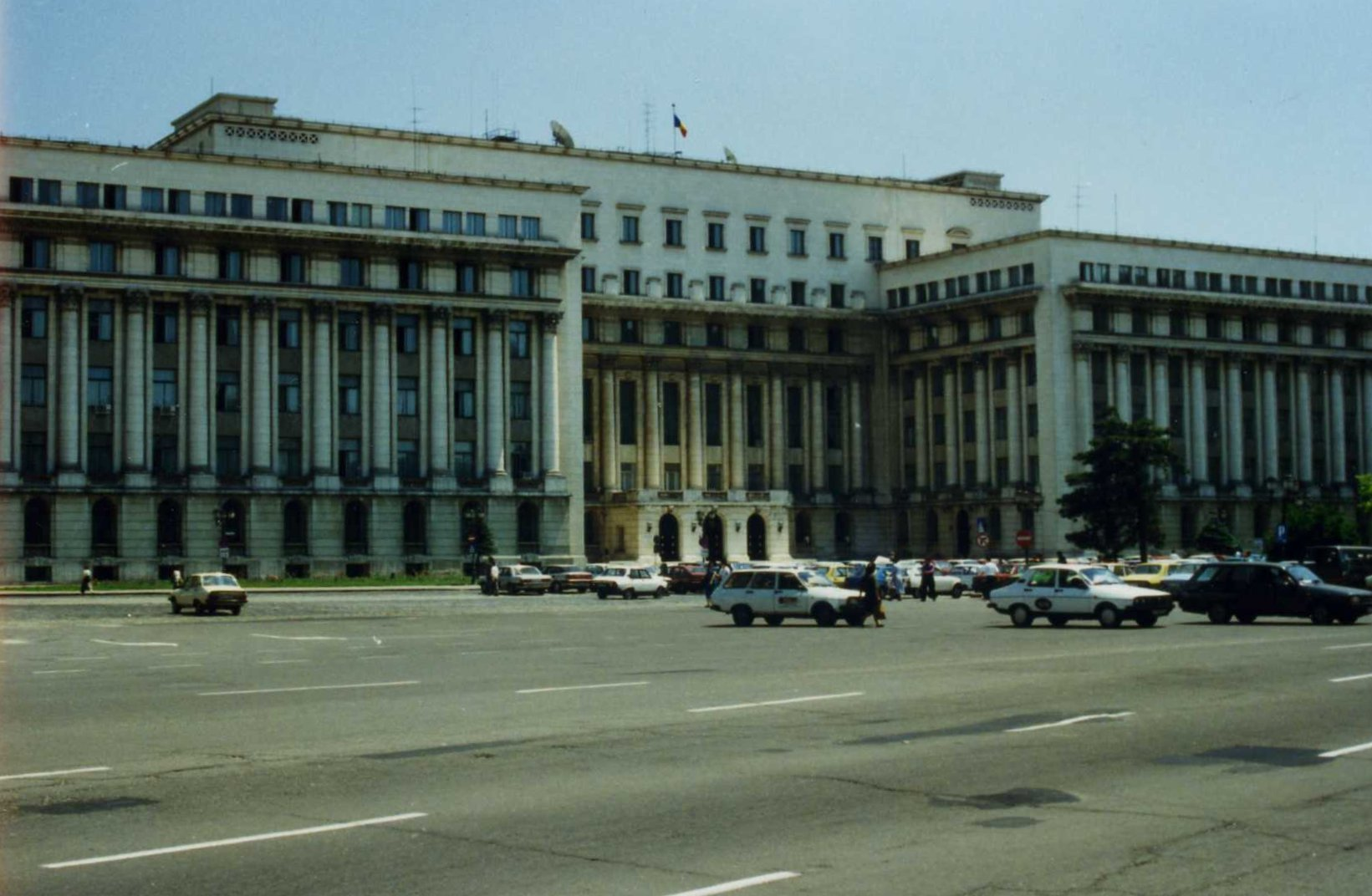
Interior Ministry Palace, where Benvenisti was held as a prisoner; nowadays hosts the Senate of Romania

Benvenisti managed to survive a political purge which took place in 1950 at Ilfov's bar association. In March or April of that year, he applied at the Embassy for an extension of his entry visa to Israel, hoping to receive his Romanian passport, allowing him to leave the country. He admitted to have engaged Halevy in conversation on that and several other occasions. Suzana, unemployed by 1947, found work at the WJC and helped her husband with documentation for Averbuch Agamy (though she reportedly regarded Israeli diplomats as "imperialists"); by 1948, she had switched to a position in the Romanian state bureaucracy, at the Nicolae Bălcescu Cultural Fund, and in February 1949 was working as a typist for the Israeli Embassy. The Securitate was expanding on its actions against the Zionists, with Cohen and Cornel Iancu targeted by June. As the former recalls, they had tried to warn Benvenisti that he could expect the same outcome. Under interrogation, Moscovici alleged that Suzana was passionate about getting Ben-Gurion's government to rescue the Zionist groups, pleading with her superiors at the Embassy to advocate the issue on her behalf.

The Benvenistis were living in an apartment on Republicii Boulevard, 37 when Mișu was arrested on July 10, 1950. He was held at the Interior Ministry Palace to early August, and then moved to "the basement of a large villa" until October, and possibly kept in Malmaison prison in October–December. Benvenisti was first interrogated on August 14 by a Securitate team known to have been led by Lieutenant Major Gheorghe Rujan, but whose other members remained entirely anonymous. Comparing these records with parallel testimonies provided by Zionist Smaya Avny-Steinmetz, Wexler and Popov also argue that Benvenisti was tortured "liberally" after that date, in what was an attempt to extract his confession to have spied for Israel. They believe that such treatment would explain Benvenisti's subsequent health problems. On September 21, 1950, "after 73 days of inquiry", he still maintained that he owed his arrest to "a slanderous or knavish action by some enemy of mine".

Over the following days, Benvenisti recanted his earlier confessions about his 1949 meetings with Averbuch Agamy, agreeing with the Securitate that these were meant for Zionist purposes: Benvenisti and Mella Iancu were asked to handle Israeli aid for the Romanian Jews; he refused, since he believed the aid was tied to the emigration policy. During these early sessions, Benvenisti was asked about his contacts with Foreign Minister (and communist factional leader) Ana Pauker—possibly because her rivals were preparing to implicate her in the scandal. Benvenisti reported no direct encounters, though he notes that Averbuch Agamy was discussing Jewish emigrations with Pauker. On June 18, 1951, Securitate Lieutenant Aurel Manu, who had been introduced as Benvenisti's second case worker, staged a confrontation between Benvenisti and Lecca. The latter presented a version of wartime events in which Benvenisti was "not a defender of the Zionists, not of the Jews [at large], but a defender of his own existence and his very own pocket." This was followed on June 21 by another such confrontation, one between Zissu and Benvenisti. The two men displayed their contempt for each other—though they still presented similarly negative portrayals of Lecca.

During December 1951, Benvenisti was moved back to a cell at the Ministry of the Interior. Again interrogated, he agreed with the charge of wartime collaborationism, noting that his actions had been detrimental to the "working-class people" of Romania. He fully caved in on January 4, 1952, when he gave a false confession to having spied for international Zionism. He claimed to quote from memory a letter once received from Tabacinic-Sunea, who had fled to Istanbul. As Wexler and Popov note, the supposed document integrated terminology that "no Western intelligence service would have been caught using", and contained orders for Benvenisti to send Tabacinic-Sunea newspaper clippings "which is to say publicized material that anyone would have had access to, in a free country." Genuine elements in this confession referred to his having sent abroad fragments from the official newspapers (including Monitorul Oficial, Timpul, Curentul and Universul) and photographs by Fred Șaraga, all of which referred to the Bucharest and Iași pogroms of 1941. Benvenisti also claimed that Averbuch Agamy was blackmailing him into spying, by pretending not to care about Itzacar's ultimate fate. In March, when asked to describe his involvement with military intelligence, Benvenisti spoke of his having witnessed the arrival in Bucharest of Soviet-trained units from the Tudor Vladimirescu and HCC Divisions, and of sending Israel information about them being "very well equipped and highly motivated". Securitate Colonel Mișu Dulgheru sent this confession to be analyzed by the Bucharest Military Tribunal.

=== Final imprisonment and release ===
Wexler and Popov note that the "Kafkaesque" Securitate became invested in presenting Jewish resistance during the Holocaust as in itself evidence of a Zionist spying network. Benvenisti was also able to resist Securitate pressures on at least three counts—he refused to present himself as a paid spy, noting that "I was a lawyer and made enough money as such"; he also would not incriminate Cohen, and did not confirm the Securitate claim that all Jewish aid societies were foreign spy-rings. By mid-1952, his political friends, including Menahem Fermo, were also picked up, and held together with Benvenisti at Jilava Prison; Zissu was also held there, and, as Fermo reports, would still treat each other as rivals—though they also supported each other by walking hand in hand. Benvenisti alternated between enthusiasm about rebuilding Romanian Zionism and moments of deep depression, in which he contemplated suicide (he and Fermo also talked literature, and in particular Marcel Proust).

According to Securitate records, all interrogations ceased from October 1952 to January 1953, which, Wexler notes, was a means of exercising "psychological pressure" on Benvenisti. Suzana Benvenisti was tried on November 13, 1953, alongside Litman; she had been implicated in her husband's affairs by Mella Iancu's testimonies. She was convicted to 10 years in prison, prompting Goldman to issue a formal protest on behalf of the WJC. Suzana's absence reportedly left her mother-in-law destitute; she received a modest sum from the Embassy, which Rohrlich was trying to supplement by December 1951. Mișu himself appeared alongside Zissu, Cohen and ten others at a trial in March 1954. He was sentenced to lifetime imprisonment and hard labor. In July 1954, as part of a selective release of the imprisoned Zionists, it was announced that Suzana Benvenisti would be retried by a civilian court.

In 1955, Mișu Benevenisti was being held at Văcărești Prison, sharing his cell with anti-communist Romanians such as Lieutenant Radu Sturdza and Johnny Rotaru. At Văcărești, the Zionist leader also greeted Radu Ciuceanu, son of his high school teacher. Ciuceanu found him somewhat disagreeable due to his suspiciously "clean smell"; as he later discovered, this was the first sign of an unexpected general improvement in prison conditions, with the regime no longer bent on killing or maiming its opponents. Their clique maintained looser contacts with the other cells, which housed noted antisemites. One was Pavel Krupensky, who made a point of never speaking directly to Benvenisti—though Ghiță Bencu, who was held there for his activities within the Iron Guard, "walk[ed] hand in hand with Mișu Benvenisti, [forming an] antinomic pair". Ciuceanu also observed that the group were wearing new, clean, uniforms, and were inspected by doctors.

On Yom Kippur (September 1955), Benvenisti slipped into a diabetic coma, and was at a high risk of dying. Reportedly, he obtained medical assistance only because of an intervention on his behalf by Groza's Jewish barber, Max Friedman. On April 14, 1956, shortly before a détente in Israel–Romania relations, the Presidium of the Great National Assembly (then under Constantin Pîrvulescu) pardoned Benvenisti and Zissu together. The new Chief Rabbi, Moses Rosen, was among those involved in negotiating emigration waivers for both men. As he himself noted, the two received their Romanian passports during Rosen's meeting with Deputy Premier Emil Bodnăraș, who reportedly exclaimed: "They wish to leave, so Mazal tov!"—"as if speaking out loud his thoughts: 'there is no downside to their leaving, godspeed to them'." The news of this mass pardon was brought to the Romanians of Văcărești by Shlomo Sitnovitzer, held there for his involvement with Irgun. According to Ciuceanu, Sitnovitzer believed that Benvenisti was due for "high office", "perhaps in America".

=== Life in Israel ===
Benvenisti began a new stage in his life, as an Israeli diplomat integrated with the Jewish Agency for Israel. Known as "Moshe Benvenisti", in October 1956 he traveled with Idov Cohen and others to West Germany, where he negotiated compensation rights for Transnistria deportees—based on the claim that "Bucharest had been the Nazi center from which the persecution of Jews in all parts of Romania was controlled." Benvenisti supported this interpretation by adding that "he himself had negotiated with agents of the Nazi regime in Bucharest", and "brought evidence that the Nazis had a direct influence on the persecution of Jews in Romania." Before his death in 1977, he established a fund for research into Romanian Jewish history—as noted in 2014 by Moraru, "nothing is known about what came of [it]." His widow Suzana died at Ramat Aviv in early 1996; she was aged 89. In November of that year, a memorial plaque for both Benvenistis was put up at Beit Ya'akov Yosef (Zvi Gutman) Synagogue in Tel Aviv.
