= Radu Lecca =

Romanian spy, journalist, civil servant and convicted war criminal

Radu D. Lecca
- Courtroom sketch of Radu Lecca, by Eva Munteanu (1946)
- Born: February 15, 1890; Ungureni, Bacău County, Kingdom of Romania
- Died: 1980 (aged 89–90); Aiud, Alba County, Socialist Republic of Romania
- Occupations: Civil servant; journalist
- Status: Sentence reduced; released (1963)
- Convictions: France (1931); Espionage; Romania (1946–48); War crimes; Crimes against the peace; Treason; Illegal income
- Trial: Romanian People's Tribunal
- Penalty: 2-year imprisonment (1931‍–‍1933); Death (1946, commuted to life imprisonment); 2-year imprisonment (1948, nominally)

Radu D. Lecca (February 15, 1890–1980) was a Romanian spy, journalist, civil servant and convicted war criminal. A World War I veteran who served a prison term for espionage in France during the early 1930s, he was a noted supporter of antisemitic concepts and, after 1933, an agent of influence for Nazi Germany. While becoming a double agent for Romania's Special Intelligence Service (SSI), Lecca was involved in fascist politics, gained in importance during World War II and the successive dictatorships, and eventually grew close to Conducător Ion Antonescu.

After 1941, Lecca was Commissioner, later Commissioner General, tasked with solving the "Jewish Question" in Romania, sharing Romania's responsibility for the Holocaust. Advised by the special German envoys Manfred Freiherr von Killinger and Gustav Richter and acting with Antonescu's consent, he established the Central Jewish Office (Centrala Evreiască, CE) through which he persecuted, exploited and extorted the Romanian Jewish community, whose existence was threatened by deportations into Transnistria. The system he supervised was notoriously corrupt, with many of the funds extorted being used for the personal benefit of Lecca or his political associates. Commissioner Lecca was also instrumental in negotiating the Final Solution's application in Romania, a plan which was eventually abandoned, while considering mass emigration to Palestine in exchange for payments.

After the August 1944 Coup removed Antonescu and aligned Romania with the Allies, Lecca was among the high-ranking Romanian politicians arrested and transported to the Soviet Union. Upon his 1946 return, Lecca was Antonescu's co-defendant in a People's Tribunal case, and was condemned to death. His sentence was commuted into life imprisonment and later reduced by the communist regime. After his release, Lecca wrote memoirs which make various controversial claims, and which minimize his and Antonescu's participation in Holocaust-related crimes.

== Biography ==
=== Early life and career ===
Born in Leca village (part of Ungureni, Bacău County), Radu Lecca was the scion of a landowning family. He was educated in Vienna and Paris, and, according to one eyewitness account, was "the perfect polyglot". Lecca's brother, Sergiu, also had a career in politics, before moving into the diplomatic service.

Radu Lecca was drafted into the Romanian Army in 1915, and, after Romania's entry into the war the following year, saw action on the local front. During the early interwar years, he worked as a commercial agent in France. In 1931, French authorities arrested him and a French court convicted him for espionage, based on revelations that he had provided Romanian King Carol II with sensitive information about prominent politicians subsidized by France.

Having served his sentence by 1933, Lecca left for Germany, where a Nazi dictatorship was taking its first steps. He began frequenting senior Nazi Party figures, was a friend of Nazi ideologist Alfred Rosenberg, and soon after became a correspondent of the party newspaper, Völkischer Beobachter. Tasked with promoting German interests in Romania, he transferred clandestine funds from Rosenberg to the country's own fascist and antisemitic force, the National Christian Party. Polish historian Jerzy W. Borejsza describes the "intense contacts" between, on one side, Lecca and National Christian leader Octavian Goga, alongside men from the radically fascist Iron Guard, and, on the other, Rosenberg, concluding that Romania was one of the countries most infiltrated by Rosenberg's agents. Around the same time, Sergiu Lecca was involved with an Iron Guard splinter group, the Crusade of Romanianism.

Although funded by the Nazis, Radu Lecca also contacted the SSI, making himself available as a double agent. He was therefore in permanent contact with the German Embassy in Bucharest. His position there was to prove important in 1940–1941, when the Iron Guard produced a fascist-style National Legionary government. Lecca maneuvered alongside the German-endorsed political leader, General Ion Antonescu, subverting the Iron Guard's ministers. Through his contacts, he gathered information on which Nazi officials supported the Guard, and relayed it to Antonescu. According to his own testimonies, Lecca focused his attention on Kurt Geißler, the Schutzstaffel's liaison with the Guard. Lecca watched on as the Guard made preparations to oust Antonescu. He maintained that, on Geißler's request, the Guard's Legionary Police was armed with some 5,000 Walther PPs (surplus from the Berlin Police), and suggested that the Bucharest regular police chief, Guardist Ștefan Zăvoianu, had influenced Geißler into mistrusting Antonescu. Lecca also claimed that the Jilava Massacre, during which the Guard purged its political enemies, was instigated by Geißler. This account contradicts other reports, according to which the Guard was voluntarily avenging its murdered founder, Captain Corneliu Zelea Codreanu.

These intrigues were a preamble to the Guard's Legionary Rebellion, of January 1941. The attempted coup was crushed by the Conducător, who acted with authorization from Adolf Hitler. The triumphant Antonescu ordered Lecca to contact Manfred Freiherr von Killinger, the new German Ambassador, and inform him about Geißler's dissent. Lecca accomplished his task, but did so with noted reluctance. Killinger was pleasantly impressed by what he saw as Lecca's cooperative stance. The two became friends, and Killinger even helped advance Lecca's career.

In short time, Antonescu turned on the Romanian Jews, expanding the antisemitic policies favored by the Iron Guard. Thus, Radu Lecca became entangled in the antisemitic intrigue which sparked the massive Iași pogrom of June 1941. During his 1950s imprisonment and interrogation by the Securitate secret police, Lecca made some unverifiable claims about the massacre. These indicate a first-hand knowledge of the murders, and an attempt to divert the blame onto German units allegedly present in that area, at that time. Also according to Lecca's reports, Antonescu was unaware of the pogrom as it happened, and that swiftly condemned it as it became news. However, documents of the pogrom show that Iuniu (Iunius, Junius) Lecca, who worked under Eugen Cristescu at the SSI, had a major role to play in plotting the series of murders. Iuniu was probably a relative of Radu Lecca.

=== Central Jewish Office establishment ===
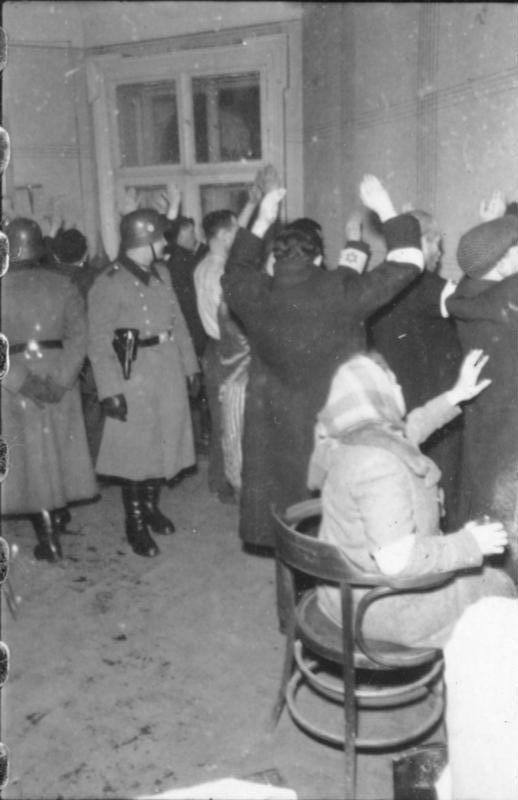
Schutzstaffel men arresting Romanian Jews (December 1941)

In late 1941, Radu Lecca was assigned Jewish Affairs Commissioner and supervisor of the newly created Central Jewish Office. This advancement may have been owed to Killinger's favors. Establishing the CE was a measure suggested to Lecca by special Nazi envoys, who wanted to involve Romania in their pan-European Final Solution project. Gustav Richter, the German official directly involved in the negotiations, hoped the Central Jewish Office would function as a Judenrat, to ensure the compliance of senior Jewish community leaders. Lecca was in close contacts with both Richter and Killinger, establishing communication channels leading from Killinger to Conducător Antonescu and to the Romanian deputy leader, Mihai Antonescu.

It was also Richter who suggested to Lecca that Nandor Gingold, a Jewish physician and lapsed Roman Catholic convert, be made General Secretary of the CE Central Committee. Lecca's personal selection for CE President was Henric Streitman, a prominent and eclectic journalist of the interwar period. Streitman was an unwitting collaborator, who believed that compliance was a path to survival, and whose assignments were mostly ceremonial. Gingold, who managed the CE bureaucracy, justified his appointment in different terms. He believed the Office could serve to postpone other pogroms, and that Hitler simply wanted to evict Jews into Nazi-occupied Poland and then to areas located outside Europe. Gingold did not facilitate the deportations to Transnistria, but, as British historian Dennis Deletant notes, neither did he object. A "staunch anti-communist", he looked on as the Antonescus branded the deportees as "communist" agents.

The CE was originally tasked with mundane chores: producing statistical surveys, organizing special taxation, expropriation, welfare, and the civil conscription of Romanian Jews (as a free labor supply for the Romanian Army on the Eastern Front and behind the lines). The deportation effort itself was still random. In October 1941, Antonescu asked Lecca to look into the matter of deportations from Dorohoi County, and investigate complaints from the deportees' relatives. Lecca looked into the possibility of selective returns, but met resistance from Corneliu Calotescu, the Governor of Bukovina.

Lecca's other proposal was for the CE to replace all Jewish political bodies. As a result, in January 1942, Antonescu outlawed the traditional Jewish Federation, which had been founded by activist Wilhelm Filderman. Antonescu's order also hindered the growing Zionist movement, who had Mișu Benvenisti for its animator. According to Benvenisti's own reports, Richter and the CE were directly interested in destroying Romania's Zionist organizations. In practice, the CE was unable to earn the respect of most Romanian Jews, and Lecca resorted to co-opting Federation activists, and even some committed Zionists, on the CE leadership board. When the Zionists threatened to convert into an anti-German resistance movement, Lecca reluctantly overturned some of Richter's anti-Zionist measures.

Lecca's new missions did not alienate him from the German circles, and he witnessed first-hand the Germans' growing involvement in Romania's antisemitic policies. He was caught in the middle as Horst Böhme, who headed the RSHA branch in Bucharest, began investigating Killinger's bureaucratic work. This was a local facet of the violent conflict opposing the RSHA and the German Foreign Office. Böhme, who wanted to speed up the Final Solution project, was described by Lecca as a person of outstanding cruelty, promoted as kudos for his earlier rule of terror in Bohemia-Moravia. Lecca alleged that both Killinger and the senior Schutzstaffel delegate, Richter, were alarmed by Böhme's scrutiny of their dealings with the CE. He writes that Böhme accused both colleagues for leniency and incompetence, displaying such arrogance as to invite in speculation that he was mentally ill. In one of his own RSHA reports, Böhme worried that Killinger had lost Antonescu's respect, and that, among Romanians, Lecca was the only one still interested in what the German Ambassador had to say. Eventually, Böhme's notes angered the German Foreign Minister, Joachim von Ribbentrop, who obtained his reassignment, freeing Killinger of a nuisance.

=== Extortion mechanisms and extermination proposals ===
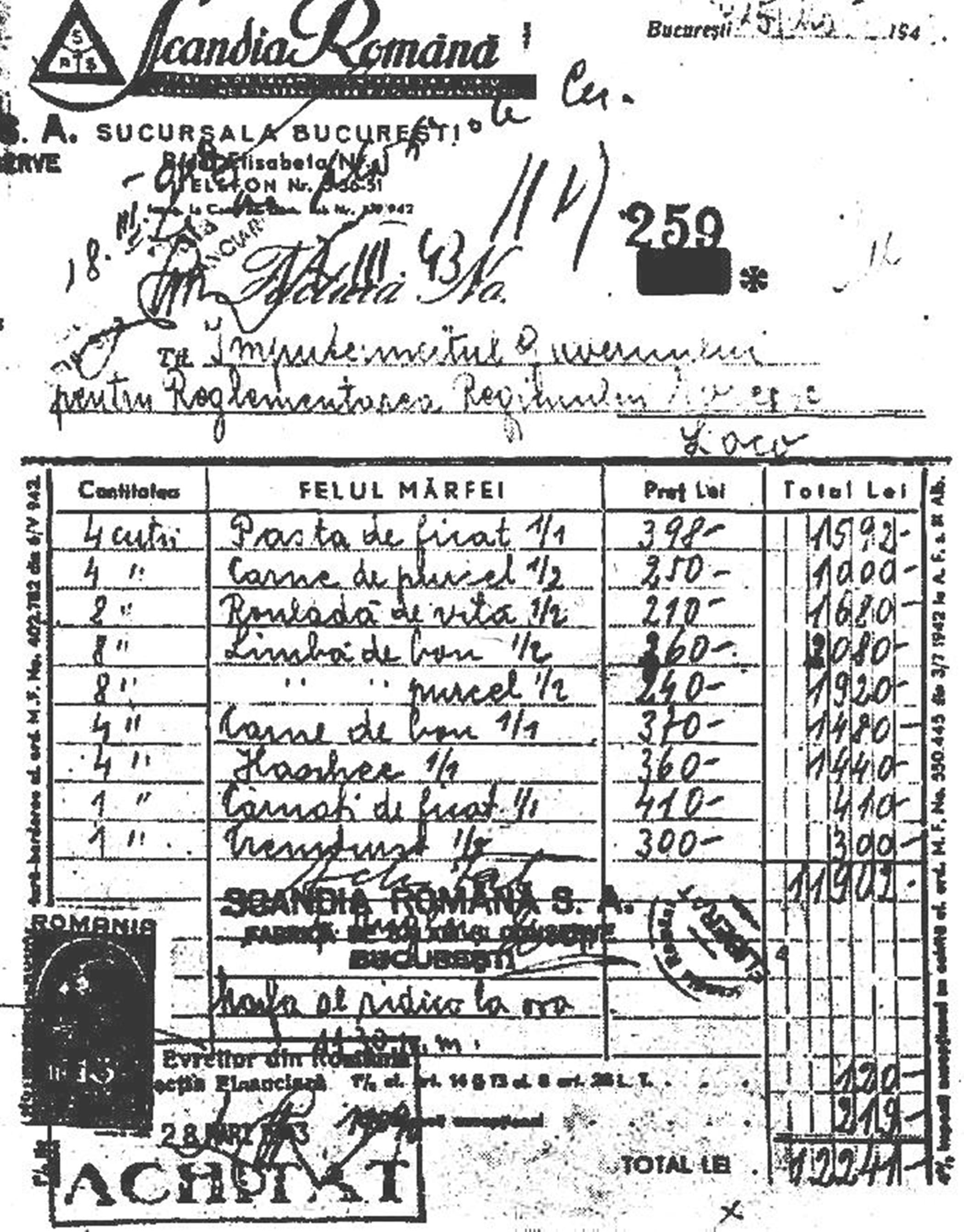
Invoice issued by Scandia Română in March 1943, documenting Lecca's use of extortion money

Beginning in early 1942, Lecca spearheaded extortion initiatives. He produced the special decrees requiring all non-deported Jews to contribute special cash funds for social causes benefiting ethnic Romanians. As early as January, he reported to Ion Antonescu that some 20,000 people targeted by this provision lacked the money and had therefore been prosecuted. Lecca informed that such blind severity defeated the economic purpose. He therefore proposed (successfully so) that a grand total of 100 million lei be collected from more affluent members of the community, and go directly through the Central Jewish Office. In August, he drafted a project to levy 1.2 billion lei from those Jewish business owners who had been spared "Romanianization", on the pretense that it would help their conscripted coreligionists. The project was endorsed by Lecca's superiors, who raised the bar by a further 800 million lei, half of it diverted to a state-endorsed charity headed by Ion Antonescu's spouse, Maria. Lecca was by then also considering the demolition of synagogues left unused in areas subject to Jewish evictions. He countersigned a plan to recycle the resulting debris, as materials for the Romanian Orthodox church in Bucecea.

Before September 1942, Lecca was contacted by German officials in the matter of planned transports from Romania, specifically southern Transylvania and the Banat, to Nazi extermination camps. He confirmed that both Ion and Mihai Antonescu had given approvals, and proceeded to instruct the Romanian Railways administration. The agreement between the two states was announced by a satisfied RSHA in July 1943. RSHA bureaucrats informed that, beginning September 10, Romanian Jews were to be forcefully embarked for Lublin (Majdanek): "those that are fit will be put to work, while the rest undergo special treatment". Preparations were well under way when Ion Antonescu withdrew his approval. In Lecca's own words, the project was left on hold "until the right time."

Researchers note that a paradoxical reason for this abrupt change was the Romanians' nationalist agenda: Romanian politicians felt alienated by the Nazi German micromanagement of Romania's internal affairs. Moreover, according to American historian Monty Noam Penkower, Lecca felt "snubbed" by Ribbentrop's subordinates while visiting Germany. Contrarily, English researcher David Cesarani locates the problem with the RSHA, who "mishandled [Lecca's] stay disastrously". Cesarani republishes angry comments made by Ribbentrop aide Franz Rademacher, accusing the RSHA of presumptuousness and breach of protocol. According to other accounts, Lecca was also a careless guest, who claimed to speak for the Romanian government, but had never obtained proper credentials for his supposed mission.

The extermination project lacked secrecy, and was therefore sabotaged from the outside. Baron Neumann of Végvár, a Banat Jewish industrialist, is credited with having coaxed and bribed some Romanian officials, focusing his effort on postponing all transports to Lublin for as long as was possible. According to historian Victor Neumann, the Baron's intervention was only part of a series of intersecting events. These include a propaganda and passive resistance effort mounted by other Jewish community leaders of the Banat, the discontent of Romanian railway employees, topical criticism coming from Romanian civil society representatives (Bishop Bălan, Iuliu Maniu), and, in some part, Antonescu's own doubts about Germany's ability to win the war. In that context, Romanian Jewish leaders also expressed solidarity with Polish Jews trapped on Romanian soil, persuading Lecca not to hand them over to the Germans.

As the Lublin project was falling apart, Lecca was streamlining the extortion part of his CE activities. In May 1943, he suggested collecting another 4 billion lei from those Jews who, as his report to the government claimed, "enjoy the freedom to trade and live protected from war". Lecca talked about his plan in a face to face meeting with Chief Rabbi Alexandru Șafran, on Hanukkah 1942. Interviewed in 1994, Șafran recalled that Lecca treated him "respectfully". He declared: "I would say that, although corrupt and sometimes inebriated, he sometimes had toward me the attitude of a true to life Romanian boyar." According to Șafran, Lecca pressured the Jews to come up with the sum in full, because "our soldiers are out on the front dying, and they stay at home". The Chief Rabbi protested that his community could never have afforded such expenditures, but Lecca replied that Antonescu was adamant and passionate about the project.

Șafran, Filderman and Benvenisti were then invited to visit the CE, where Lecca again detailed his project. Although speaking with "great gentleness", he threatened all three men with immediate arrest; in extremis, Șafran was able to change Lecca's mind. The extortion measure was still supported by Antonescu, who ruled that non-contributing Jews faced immediate deportation to Transnistria. Filderman issued a vocal protest, and faced the consequences: he was deported into a Transnistrian camp. Benvenisti took over as leader of the protest, confronting Lecca in a "long and violent discussion." After the part-tolerated Romanian opposition parties publicized their own objections and sided with the Jewish community, Antonescu signed off on Filderman's release.

=== Alternatives, corruption, policy reversals ===
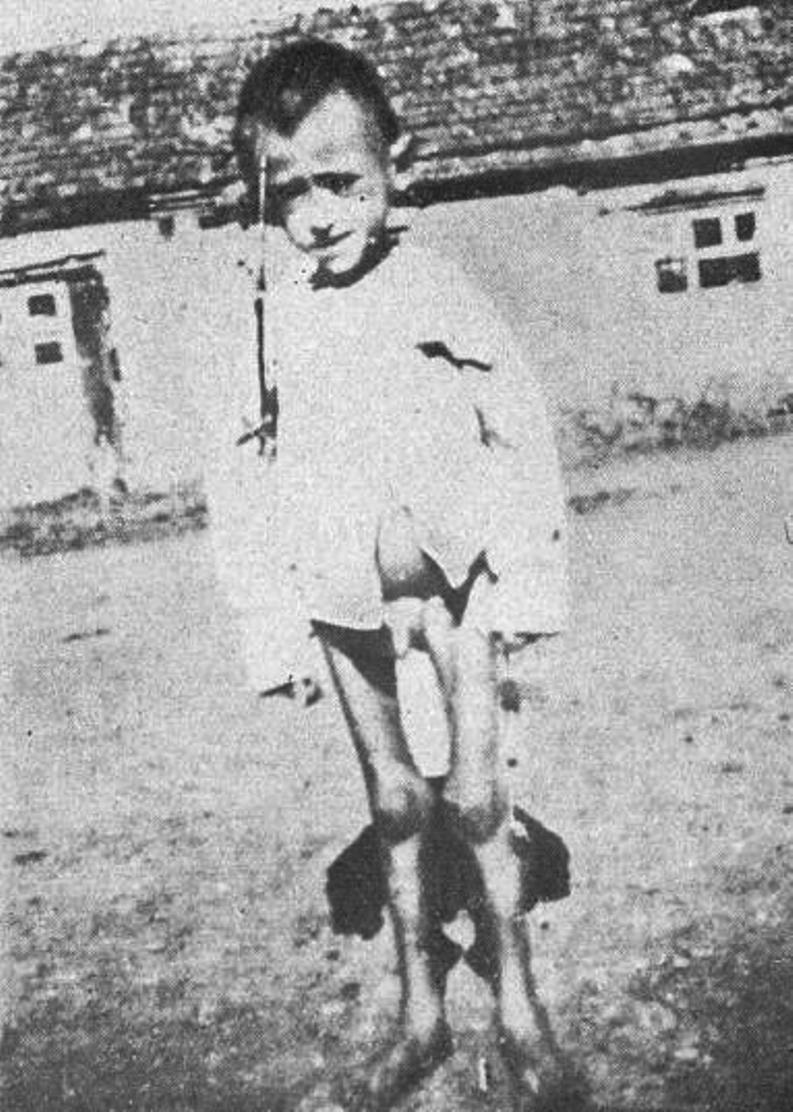
A starving Jewish child in Transnistria, photographed ca. 1943

By then, Radu Lecca was involved in dealings to have Jews from Romanian-controlled territories transferred into Palestine. He was initially approached by Apostolic Nuncio Andrea Cassulo, who asked him to intervene and allow Jewish orphans in Transnistria safe passage. At their first meeting in spring 1941, Lecca reportedly agreed, but no further measure of this kind had been taken by September, when Cassulo decided to intervene directly with the Conducător. Antonescu refused him, claiming that none of the "desired guarantees" were presented to him.

In the context of Nazi pressures to have Romanian Jews exterminated in Poland, Lecca made provisions for some 3,000 Jews to be saved and sent to Palestine in exchange for 2 million lei. In 1943, Richter warned Lecca not to approve of Filderman's plan to transport 4,000 to 5,000 orphans from Transnistria to Palestine, even as the Allies approved of their transfer. Antonescu himself only allowed sporadic transports of orphans in 1944, when it had become clear that the Axis powers were losing the war. In late 1942, Lecca had also begun negotiating with the smugglers and Zionists who organized the Aliyah Bet movement, and with Filderman, Benvenisti, etc. Aliyah Bet from Romania was set to take place once Lecca received 200,000 lei per emigrant. Claiming Antonescu's acquiescence, Lecca even informed Killinger about the deal. His reports generated German alarm, and a warning that those Jews caught in Bulgaria would be arrested on the spot.

Documents and testimonies of the period give evidence as to Lecca's corruption. His supervision helped some influential civilian administrators and soldiers, who made fortunes trafficking their own dispensations from compulsory labor. Lecca stated that he himself collected money not just for Maria Antonescu, but also for Mihai Antonescu and Killinger. Emil Ghilezan, a businessman and member of the semi-clandestine National Peasants' Party, also recounted having periodically paid off the Commissioner in order to protect the livelihoods of his Jewish employees at Ardeleana Bank.

The Commissioner is said to have deposited his extortion funds in neutral Switzerland, with Schweizerische Volksbank (later incorporated into Credit Suisse). According to other accounts, he made efforts to embezzle the money he had extorted from would-be emigrants to Palestine, and received 20 million lei from the Iași survivors, pledging them his leniency. In July 1943, Lecca suggested to postpone the planned confiscation of Iași's Jewish Cemetery. His comments were ignored by the city's antisemitic mayor, Constantin Ifrim, whose only concession on this issue was to leave exhumations in the care of a Judaic congregation. In September of the same year, Lecca was promoted Commissioner General by the Antonescus, his department reintegrated within a Secretariat for Labor. The same month, Ifrim sent Lecca a memorandum, demanding the deportation of Iași Jews to Transnistria or to the German Reichskommissariat Ukraine.

Eventually, in November 1943, following the turn of tides on the Eastern Front, Radu Lecca became party to Antonescu's revised project. This was a last-minute effort to ensure the survival, and a humane detainment at a new camp in Vyzhnytsia, of the Transnistria deportees (excepting those whom Antonescu still called "communist Jews"). At around the same time, Sergiu Lecca was in Lisbon, discussing a possible surrender to the Allies.

Radu Lecca took part in a government meeting presided upon by Antonescu: the Conducător instructed Lecca to collect funds and food for the deported Jews, whom he acknowledged were dying "at a fast rate", worrying about being perceived as the sole perpetrator of Romanian Holocaust crimes. Lecca received orders to collect his items from the Old Kingdom Jews (who, Lecca himself reports, had already contributed 160 million lei to this particular effort), but soon after sent his records of the Antonescu meeting to his Nazi contacts. Their copy, an annotated translation approved by Lecca, would be intercepted by the United States Army, and made public upon the war's end. Lecca's marginalia place the number of Transnistria Jewish survivors at an optimistic 80,000, contrary to the other his colleagues' estimates (50,000 to 60,000).

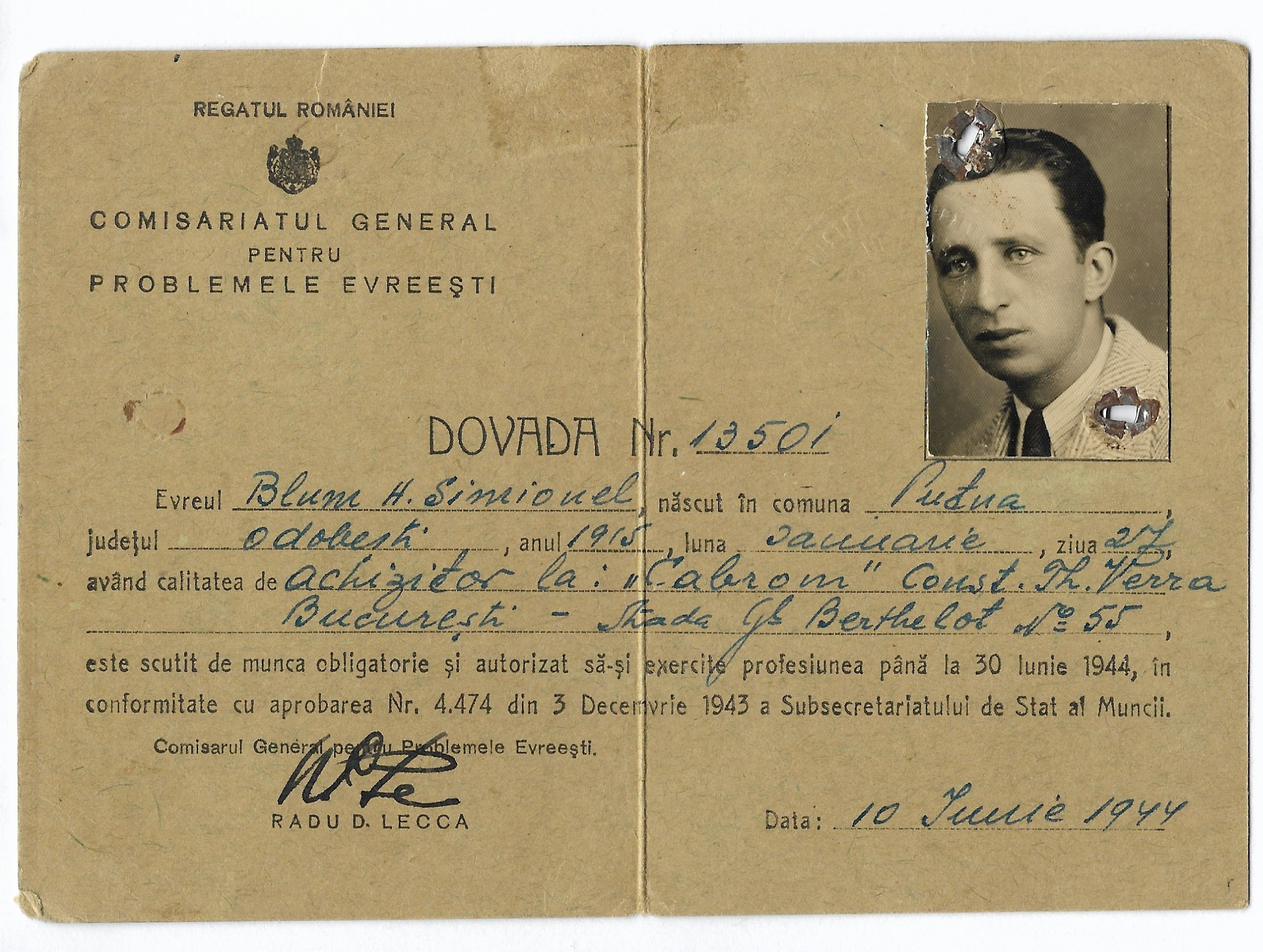
1944 Romanian special ID for Jews, hand initialed by Radu Lecca himself

Also in November 1943, Lecca conceded control over 15% of Jewish tax revenues. That money was returned to the CE, to be sent as humanitarian aid to the Jewish deportees and labor conscripts. Also then, allegedly with Killinger's consent, Lecca managed to obtain the reassignment of Gustav Richter from his post in Jewish affairs to more regular police work, proposing that: "Richter no longer has anything to direct within the Central Jewish Office." Although aware that Richter's network of spies was still at work within Jewish affairs departments, Lecca believed that Richter had since lost his motive for murder: "He was a young man, he had a wife and child, and he knew that if he lost his position in the legation [because of a diplomatic protest] he would have to leave straight for the front." However, both Lecca and SSI director Eugen Cristescu recalled that, in his new capacity, Richter obtained the January 1944 arrest of several Zionist leaders (Filderman, Benvenisti etc.), whom he denounced as conspirators against Germany; all were freed the next month, when the International Red Cross pleaded in their favor.

=== Prison term and final years ===
In late 1944, soon after the August 23 Coup overthrew the Ion Antonescu regime, Radu Lecca was arrested by the new administration. As a participant in the events, the Romanian Communist Party arranged for Antonescu and his key functionaries to be held together at a Communist hiding place in Vatra Luminoasă quarter. Romania's new government pushed the Germans out of Bucharest, and Aurel Aldea, the Interior Minister, agreed to have the "Antonescu Lot" transferred into Soviet custody. Unlike his colleagues, Lecca was able to escape custody before this could take place. According to an article in the Communist Party's Scînteia, "the gangster Radu Lecca" duped his police escort on November 18, and lost himself in the Bucharest crowd. He was apprehended by the Romanian Detective Corps only four days later.

Handed over to the Allied Commission, Lecca was taken into custody by the Soviet occupation forces, and eventually transported into Soviet territory. In June 1945, he and Antonescu were moved into Lubyanka Building cells. Lecca was repeatedly questioned by agents of the SMERSH, informing them about the Nazi network in Romania. The status of the "Antonescu Clique", Lecca included, was still being debated between the Allies. Reportedly, the United States Department of State suggested to present them before the Nuremberg Tribunal. The Soviets vetoed that option in April 1946. Lecca was returned into Romanian custody together with Ion Antonescu, Cristescu, Governor of Transnistria Gheorghe Alexianu, General Constantin Pantazi, and General Constantin Z. Vasiliu.

Lecca was subsequently a co-defendant in Antonescu's 1946 trial by the People's Tribunal, on counts of war crimes, crimes against the peace and treason, and sentenced to death on May 17. During the actual proceedings, Lecca was the target of an especially negative portrayal in Scînteia, which described him as having a "black-bluish face", noting: "A hideous man, with bloated and vice-consumed cheeks, Lecca hides his rapacity under the mask of obduration." Lecca used up his right of appeal, with a laconic address to Michael I, the Romanian King.

On May 31, his sentence, like those of Cristescu and Vasiliu, was commuted to forced labor for life, through a special decree issued by the king. Several sources note that, in issuing the pardon, Michael I answered requests made by the Communist-led Petru Groza cabinet. The government cited "national interest" or, more specifically, "the need of addressing our Country's great interests". However, according to one historian's interpretation, it is yet unclear whether King Michael merely signed off on Groza's proposal, or if he played a more active part in the decision.

In May 1948, some months after Romania had been declared a republic, Lecca faced a new indictment, for violating restrictions on the trade of coinage metals and foreign currency. He was found guilty of illegal income, for having stashed away such items, including 3,477 gold coins and a 12-kilogram gold bar. The goods were confiscated. Lecca was fined a further 4,000 lei, and 2 years were nominally added to his prison sentence. Lecca was by then being held in the Jilava Prison, detained together with lawyer-politician Aurelian Bentoiu and literary critic Nicolae Steinhardt. Steinhardt's Jewish and left-wing background is said to have been a stress factor for Lecca. As Steinhardt noted, Lecca was left paralyzed by negligent surgery on his hemorrhoids. Bedridden, he spent his time verbally abusing Bentoiu, who was similarly immobilized by a prostatectomy.

While in Securitate custody, the former Jewish Commissioner was subjected to several inquiries. His written statements were kept under key, in special files. Romanian-born Israeli historian Jean Ancel presumes that the Securitate had vested interest in allowing Lecca to produce a personal version of Romania's World War II history. The Securitate, Ancel notes, shared Lecca's goal of shifting focus from Romania's Holocaust complicity.

Radu Lecca was eventually transferred to Aiud Prison, c. 1958. According to his physician, at Aiud's "Zarca" hospital, the paralysis had spread to other parts of his body, and eventually affected his speech. Having had his sentence reduced to 18 years and 6 months, Lecca was ultimately released from prison in 1963, and soon after began writing his controversial memoirs. Probably with Securitate instructions, Lecca reportedly sought to repatriate his Swiss wealth; Schweizerische Volksbank is believed to have refused his request, motivating that the record of accounts had since been destroyed.

== Posterity ==
After the 1989 Revolution, which succeeded in toppling communism, Lecca's memoirs saw print with Editura Roza Vânturilor, a newly founded nationalist publishing house, under the title Eu i-am salvat pe evreii din România ("It Is I Who Saved Romania's Jews"). The edition is also based on his Securitate testimonies, and, according to Ancel, the post-communist Social Democratic and nationalist authorities took special care in making the book available. Among the specific unilateral claims found in the book is one according to which racist sociologist Sabin Manuilă was spying in favor of the United States. Lecca also alleged that Yannos Pandelis and Constantin Bursan, who represented the Zionist side in discussions about transfers to Palestine, were double agents of the United Kingdom and Germany. Historian Ottmar Trașcă referred to Lecca's book as "extremely controversial when it comes to scientific truth", but noted that it could prove accurate in describing the hierarchy of Nazi envoys in Romania, their early 1940s contacts with the Iron Guard, and in particular the scope of Kurt Geißler's activity in Bucharest.

Some of Lecca's claims about Antonescu's stance on the Romanian Jewry were passed into Steinhardt's book Jurnalul fericirii ("Happiness Diary"), mainly a recollection of communist imprisonment. Historian and Steinhardt biographer George Ardelean describes this as a problematic aspect, since the liberal, Europeanist and part-Jewish Steinhardt was revising his earlier stance on wartime antisemitism (of which he too had been a victim), and basing his new-found admiration for Antonescu on dubious evidence. Ardeleanu stated: "To only quote Radu Lecca means to emerge with a vulnerable [research] bibliography."

Eu i-am salvat pe evreii din România contributed to the urban legend of Antonescu as a protector of Jewish lives. Historian Laurențiu Constantiniu argues that the book made Romanian officials negate the existence of the Holocaust throughout the 1990s, giving rise to "absurd confabulations" regarding Antonescu. Controversy erupted in 2003, when some of Lecca's judgments were uncritically used as sources for a Romanian manual on Holocaust history (called "disinformation textbook" and "extremely vulgar" by researcher Alexandru Florian).

More controversy surrounds the issue of Lecca's extortion funds and their potential recovery. The Schweizerische Volksbank lead was picked up by the World Jewish Congress. In 1996, it reportedly accused the Swiss Bankers Association of intending to hide data concerning the money that Radu Lecca had extorted from Romania's Jews.
