= Viforeni =

Viforeni may refer to several villages in Romania:

- Viforeni is a village in Ungureni Commune, Bacău County
- Viforeni, a village in Gorbănești Commune, Botoșani County
