= Manfred Freiherr von Killinger =

German Nazi politician (1886–1944)

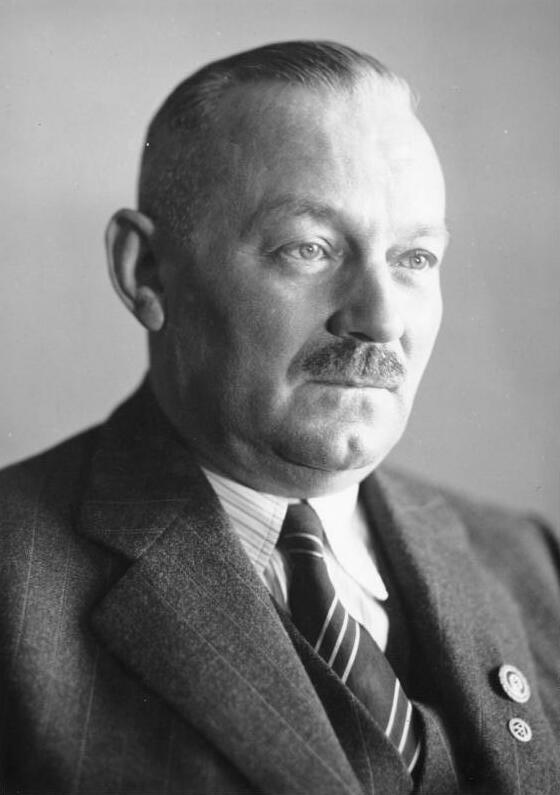

Ambassador to Romania
- In office 1941 – September 2, 1944
- Preceded by: Wilhelm Fabricius
- Succeeded by: Carl August Clodius

Ambassador to the Slovak State
- In office 1940–1941
- Preceded by: Position established
- Succeeded by: Hanns Ludin

Minister-President of the Free State of Saxony
- In office 1933–1935
- Preceded by: Walter Shieck
- Succeeded by: Martin Mutschmann

Personal details
- Born: 14 July 1886 Gut Lindigt, Kingdom of Saxony, German Empire
- Died: 2 September 1944 (aged 58) Bucharest, Kingdom of Romania
- Party: Nazi Party

Manfred Freiherr von Killinger (14 July 1886 – 2 September 1944) was a German naval officer, Freikorps leader, military writer and Nazi politician. A veteran of World War I and member of the Marinebrigade Ehrhardt during the German Revolution, he took part in the military intervention against the Bavarian Soviet Republic. After the Freikorps was disbanded, the antisemitic Killinger was active in the Germanenorden and Organisation Consul, masterminding the murder of Matthias Erzberger. He was subsequently a Nazi Party deputy in the Reichstag and a leader of the Sturmabteilung, before serving as Saxony's Minister-President and playing a part in implementing Nazi policies at a local level.

Purged during the Night of the Long Knives, he was able to recover his status, and served as Nazi Germany's Consul in San Francisco between 1936 and 1939. As Ambassador to the Slovak Republic in 1940, he played a part in enforcing antisemitic legislation in that country. In early 1941, Killinger was appointed to a similar position in Romania, where he first became noted for supporting Ion Antonescu during the Legionary Rebellion. Together with his aide Gustav Richter, he attempted to gain Romania's participation in the German-led Final Solution, thus pressuring Romanian authorities to divert focus from their own mass murder of Jews. Killinger oversaw German presence in Romania until 1944, and was the target of a notorious 1943 pamphlet by writer Tudor Arghezi. He committed suicide in Bucharest, days after King Michael's Coup of 23 August 1944 toppled the Antonescu regime.

== Biography ==
=== Military career and Freikorps leadership ===
Born in Gut Lindigt (now part of Nossen) in the Kingdom of Saxony, and raised an Evangelical-Lutheran, Killinger was from an aristocratic Swabian-Frankish family originally from the "knightly territory" of Kraichgau in Baden-Württemberg. He completed his primary education in Nossen, and gymnasium in Meissen and Freiberg, becoming a cadet of the Ritter-Akademie in Dresden.

After 1904, Killinger was a cadet in the German Empire's Naval Forces, where he trained as a torpedo boat operator. Fighting in World War I, he was commander of the torpedo boat V 3, and took part in the Battle of Jutland (Skagerrakschlacht). Killinger rose to the rank of lieutenant commander.

After the conflict, Killinger became politically oriented towards the far right. He soon became involved with the paramilitary anti-communist organization known as the Freikorps, which was the conservative and nationalist reply to the German Revolution. He joined the Marinebrigade Ehrhardt, a unit of the Freikorps, and was commander of a storm company within the brigade. Killinger was in Munich during the bitter fighting between the Freikorps and the Communist Party-dominated Red Guards of the Bavarian Soviet Republic. He later indicated that, during the conflict, he had disfigured captured Red Guards and had ordered a female Communist sympathizer to be whipped "until no white spot was left on her backside".

Subsequently, Killinger was also involved in the Kapp Putsch against the Weimar Republic, provoked by the authorities' decision to disarm the Freikorps; following that, he organized another paramilitary group under the name Union of Front-Line Veterans, and joined the Munich-based antisemitic secret society known as the Germanenorden, which proclaimed its allegiance to the Aryan race and the Germanic peoples.

=== Organisation Consul and Erzberger's killing ===
Killinger belonged to the antisemitic organization, Deutschvölkischer Schutz- und Trutzbund. By 1920, he also became a leader in the Organisation Consul. As such, he helped to plan the murder of Matthias Erzberger, former Minister of Finance, who had become a target as early as 1918, when he had signed his name to the Armistice of Compiègne. He personally supervised the way in which Heinrich Tillessen and Heinrich Schulz, the people charged with assassinating Erzberger (both members of the Germanenorden), carried out their task. He is also alleged to have masterminded the 1922 murder of Foreign Minister Walther Rathenau.

The murder provoked a series of street rallies called by the Social Democrats and the Independent Social Democrats, who were joined by the Communists. In parallel, the far right press equated Killinger's squad with Wilhelm Tell and Charlotte Corday.

In August, the Joseph Wirth cabinet and President Friedrich Ebert advanced legislation giving Minister of the Interior Georg Gradnauer the power to ban anti-republican organizations. This caused an uproar in Bavaria, which was then ruled by the right-wing People's Party-led coalition of Gustav Ritter von Kahr, who accused Wirth of favoring the Left. The dispute became entangled with that over Bavaria's long-standing state of emergency, which the federal government, unlike the Bavarian officials, wanted to see abolished. The crisis ended in September, when Kahr lost the support of his own party and resigned.

Facing trial over his implication in the murder as Tillessen and Schulz escaped to Hungary, Killinger was acquitted by an Offenburg court in mid-June 1925 (after the end of World War II, Schulz and Tillessen were sentenced to prison terms). He became a high level functionary in the Organization Consul and the Viking League. Around 1924, he was also involved in secret rearmament program, by setting up an enterprise in the Spanish locality of Etxebarria, and secretly experimenting with submarines.

=== Nazi beginnings and leadership of Saxony ===
In 1927, the Viking League was outlawed and, as a result, Killinger joined the Nazi Party, which had been created by Adolf Hitler. In 1928, he was elected to the Landtag in Saxony, and, in the election of July 1932, to the Reichstag from electoral constituency 28, Dresden–Bautzen. He retained a seat in this body until the end of the Nazi regime, switching to constituency 14, Weser-Ems, at the election of March 1936 and to constituency 23, Düsseldorf West, at the election of April 1938. In parallel, Killinger was an SA-Obergruppenführer of the Sturmabteilung (head of the SA Mitteldeutschland, and, after 1932, head of the SA-Obergruppe V in Saxony, Thuringia, and Saxony-Anhalt).

On 10 March 1933, after Hitler established the Nazi regime, Minister of the Interior Wilhelm Frick authorized Killinger to take control of Saxony as Reichskommissar, and to depose the Minister-President Walther Schieck (a member of the German People's Party). As this happened, Sturmabteilung and Schutzstaffel troopers clamped down on leftist organizations throughout the region, and raised the swastika flag on official buildings. Three days later, Killinger banned all non-Nazi paramilitary groups active in Saxony, as thousands of people spontaneously affiliated with the Nazis. He also issued an order creating a special counter-intelligence unit to report on "Bolshevik activities", and, on April 4, ordered a new Landtag and local councils to be formed on the basis of results in the previous Reichstag elections. In this, he arguably profited from the fact that far left parties had already been banned.

As the resulting cabinet was being introduced by Killinger, Nazi Gauleiter Martin Mutschmann was appointed Reich Governor (Reichstatthalter) of Saxony. Social Democrats, the one opposition force inside the Landtag, were subject to and violence persecutions, and many interned in newly created concentration camps. Their local section was officially banned on 23 June 1933, leaving the Nazis in absolute control over Saxony. At the same time, Hitler reportedly called on Killinger not to allow violence to degenerate into disorder, and to confine repression to the left and members of the German Jewish community. Over the following years, Nazi violence in Saxony would specifically target Communists and Jews.

In May, Killinger took over the office of Minister-President; he also became the Saxon Minister of the Interior, which brought him control over local police forces. In his first official acts, Killinger removed the modernist Otto Dix from his positions as professor and rector of the Dresden Academy of Arts, and dismissed the Democratic Party's Mayor of Dresden, Wilhelm Külz (altogether, nine out of twenty mayors in large Saxon cities resigned as a direct result of Nazi pressures). In September, Dix's artworks were mockingly showcased in large exhibit of "degenerate art" held in Dresden.

In June 1934, Hitler, together with Hermann Göring, and Schutzstaffel leader Heinrich Himmler, launched the Night of the Long Knives, during which the Sturmabteilung was purged and many of its leaders, whom Hitler viewed as potential rivals, were killed (Ernst Röhm included). Killinger, a leader in the SA, barely survived the purge, and was deposed from all his offices a few days after Röhm died. Almost a year later, in March 1935, he was replaced as Saxony's Minister-President by Mutschmann. This also constituted the final stage in a prolonged power struggle between the former Reichskommissar and Mutschmann. Later in the year, Killinger was appointed a member of the Volksgerichtshof, or German People's Court, but his career in the Nazi justice system was a brief one.

=== Early diplomatic career and Legionary Rebellion ===
In 1936, Killinger started a new career in Germany's diplomatic service. From 1936 to early 1939, he was sent to the United States as Germany's first Consul General in San Francisco. According to Time, Killinger, who had allegedly grown "unpopular" in the United States, was "recalled to the Reich to report on the bombing of a Nazi freighter in Oakland Estuary [in November 1938]". He was replaced by Fritz Wiedemann, Hitler's personal aide, whose mission, according to Time, was "to smooth ruffled U. S.-German relations and sell the Nazi regime to an unsympathetic U. S."

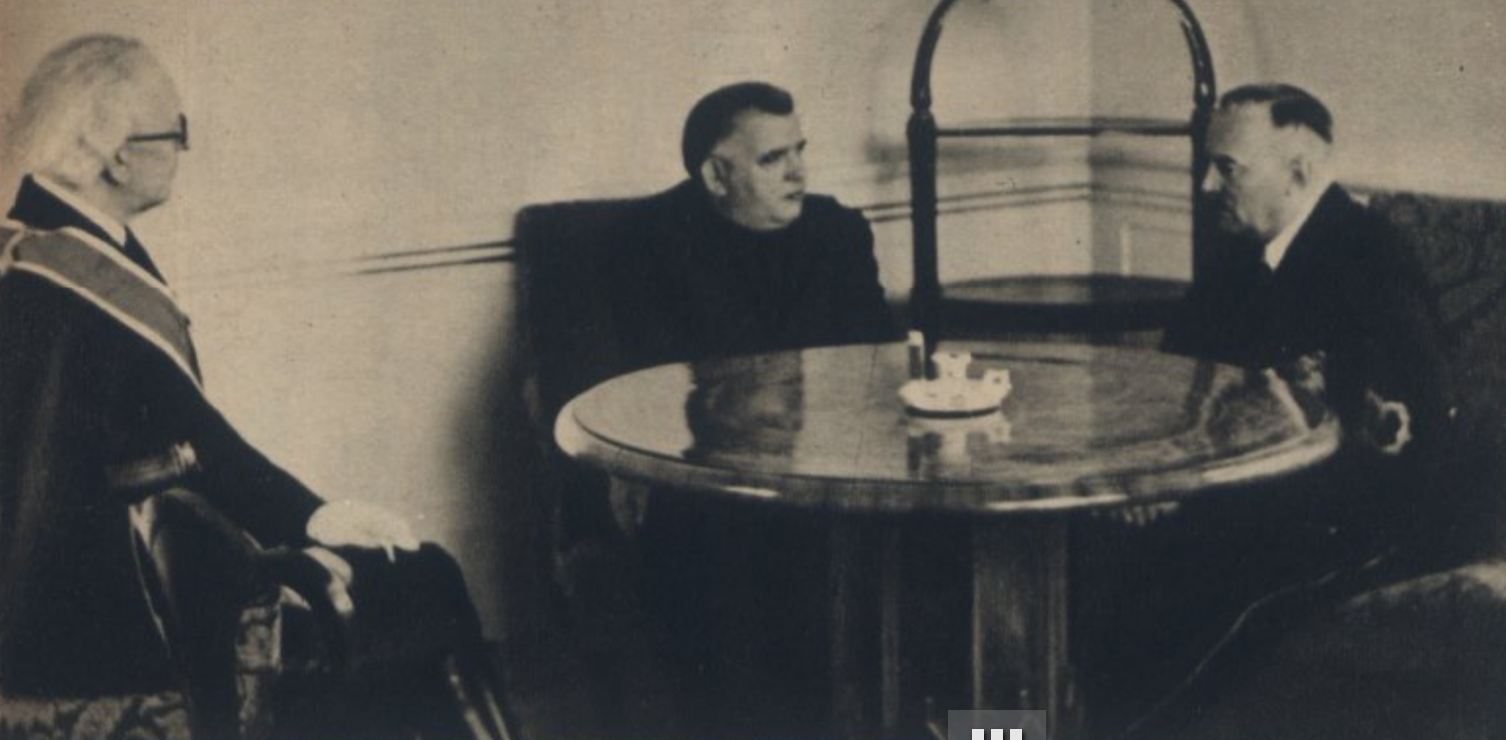
Manfred von Killinger meets Tiso and Tuka, August 1940

In 1940, Killinger was appointed as Germany's Ambassador to the newly created Slovak Republic. In the latter capacity, he intervened in the competition between, on one side, the pragmatic authoritarian Ferdinand Ďurčanský and, on the other, the fascist Jozef Tiso and Vojtech Tuka's Hlinka Guard, asking for Ďurčanský to be dismissed (which occurred in the same month).

Over the following period, Killinger was charged with increasing German control over Slovakia by organizing bodies of Nazi advisers—one of them was Dieter Wisliceny, a collaborator of Adolf Eichmann, who was charged with seeing an end to the "Jewish Question". Starting in September, Wisliceny helped implement a series of racial antisemitic measures, which contrasted with previous religious discrimination policies and culminated in the deportation and murder of a majority of Slovak Jews in 1942. Manfred von Killinger's office as Ambassador was eventually taken on by Hanns Ludin.

He was appointed as Germany's Ambassador to Romania in December 1940, and took office in January, replacing Wilhelm Fabricius and maintaining links with the fascist regime of Conducător Ion Antonescu (see Romania during World War II). This came as Hitler decided to endorse Antonescu in his conflict with the Iron Guard, which had until then formed the National Legionary Government. The importance of his new office was also evidence of Foreign Minister Joachim von Ribbentrop's conflict with Himmler, which had led him to seek support from former Sturmabteilung leaders.

His arrival in Bucharest coincided with the Legionary Rebellion, when the Romanian Army defeated the Guard. By early February, as Wehrmacht troops in Romania gave Antonescu their support, Killinger investigated cases where members of the Gestapo, Schutzstaffel, or Sicherheitsdienst aided the latter, and reported these to his overseers. The latter denunciation centered on Otto Albrecht von Bolschwing, the Gestapo chief in Bucharest, whom Killinger accused of having hidden 13 Iron Guardists in the Embassy building. In March, Antonescu declared Bolschwing a persona non grata; he was recalled to Berlin, and later sent to a concentration camp, and near the end of the war moved to Austria, joining up with the underground resistance and the Allies. In May, Killinger voiced Germany's offer to turn over Iron Guard politicians who had taken refuge in Germany, including their leader Horia Sima, who faced the death penalty; Antonescu declined, saying:

[...] at this moment, I do not intend to benefit from the Führer's goodwill, for it would be awkward for me to execute people who have collaborated with my Government. However, I ask Mr. Hitler that all the Romanian political refugees be kept under close surveillance and in case I or the German Government would note that they do not abide by the obligations contracted, I'll ask for them to be extradited and tried.

=== Killinger and the Romanian Jews ===
Beginning in spring 1941, Killinger played an important part in imposing new antisemitic measures in Romania. In April, Gustav Richter was sent by the RSHA as an "expert on Jewish problems", subordinated to the Ambassador; the following month, he reported to Killinger, giving a positive assessment of Antonescu's moves to curb the Romanian Jewish community's political activities, and the creation of a Jewish Council "as the sole authorized Jewish organization". In this context, Richter also noted that Romanian authorities had decided to institute an obligation to report all Jewish property, and had provided for the "evacuation of the Jews from Romania". In effect, Richter was charged with setting in motion the Final Solution in Romania. Radu Lecca, a Romanian politician who was charged with overseeing the status of Romanian Jews, recounted that, through extortion, the Jewish Council provided material gains to the Romanian leaders and Killinger alike.

Manfred von Killinger maintained his diplomatic post after 22 June, as Romania took part in Operation Barbarossa. As the Romanian Army marched into Bessarabia and Ukraine, Antonescu began planning Romania's own version of the Final Solution, which he intended to carry out locally—defining it as "the cleansing of the land" (see Holocaust in Romania). Early on, military authorities ordered a group of approx. 25,000 Bessarabian Jews to be deported to Mohyliv-Podilskyi, but the Wehrmacht killed some 12,000 of them and sent the survivors back into Romanian territory. This was one of several such episodes—German decisions to shoot or turn back the Jews expelled over the Dniester became widespread after the Wehrmacht began reporting that they were dying of hunger and alleged that they spread disease. Consequently, Antonescu asked Killinger not to allow deportees to return, stressing that it contradicted his personal agreement with Hitler.

Killinger continued to report on the way Romania had decided to carry out its own program of extermination, and, in August 1941, alarmed the authorities in Berlin with evidence that Antonescu had ordered 60,000 Jewish men from the Old Kingdom to be deported in Transnistria. During September, he engaged Transnistrian Governor Gheorghe Alexianu in talks over the situation of ethnic Germans (Volksdeutsche) in the area, who were by then coming under the leadership of a Volksdeutsche Mittelstelle. Not answering to Romanian administration, the latter body was by then carrying out its own extermination policy, being responsible for the shootings of Jews in various areas between the Dniester and the Southern Bug, before being joined in this by Romanian troops and their subordinate Ukrainian militias.

After further discussions with Antonescu in July 1942, Killinger was able to obtain a decision that all Romanian Jews living in Nazi-occupied Europe were to be treated the same as German Jews, and were thus exposed to Nazi extermination policies. In November of the same year, as the Germans put pressures on Romania to join in its application of the Final Solution, Killinger and Richter formally asked Ion Antonescu and his Foreign Minister Mihai Antonescu why they had not implemented the deportation of Romanian Jews to the General Government in occupied Poland. They replied that Romania had considered applying such a measure for Jews living in southern Transylvania, but had decided to postpone it. This was a sign of the dissatisfaction of Romania after the Battle of Stalingrad, and Antonescu indicated that he only considered emigration as a solution to the Jewish Question, an argument which saved Jews in the Old Kingdom and southern Transylvania from deportation. In a December 1942 report to his superiors, Killinger commented that the Conducător based his decision on the discovery that "the Jews were not all Bolsheviks" (see Jewish Bolshevism).

=== Final years ===
On 30 September 1943 the writer Tudor Arghezi used the Informaţia Zilei newspaper to publish a pamphlet strongly critical of Killinger and the Romanian-German alliance. Titled Baroane ("Baron!" or "Thou Baron"), it accused Killinger of having supervised political and economic domination:

A flower blossomed in my garden, one like a plumped-up red bird, with a golden kernel. You blemished it. You set your paws on it and now it has dried up. My corn has shot into ears as big as Barbary doves and you tore them away. You took the fruits out of my orchard by the cartload and gone you were with them. You placed your nib with its tens of thousands of nostrils on the cliffs of my water sources and you quaffed them from their depths and you drained them. Morass and slobber is what you leave behind in the mountains and yellow drought in the flatlands—and out of all the birds with singing tongues you leave me with bevies of rooks.

The authorities confiscated all issues, and Arghezi was imprisoned without trial at the Târgu Jiu internment camp. Baroane contrasted with the prevalent mood in Romanian media, which offered open support to Nazism, Italian fascism, and other far right ideologies of the time, while publishing praises of German envoys such as Killinger.

According to the Argentinian-born memoirist Elsa Moravek Perou De Wagner, an incident involving Killinger and Hermann Göring took place at a Bucharest social event in 1944, when Göring's brother Albert, a businessman and rescuer of Jews, refused to sit himself at the same table as the Ambassador, whom he held personally responsible for the murder of Walther Rathenau. Albert Göring was arrested, and his brother's intervention was required to free him.

Ambassador Killinger was replaced in July 1944 by Carl August Clodius. As the Soviet Union fought its first battles on Romanian territory, Killinger signed some of his last reports, in which he claimed to have exposed a pro-Allied spy ring formed around writer Marthe Bibesco and other members of the upper class. Soon after, Fritz Kolbe passed this information to the United States, alongside details of the panic having gripped German troops on the Moldavian front.

As Antonescu was overthrown by opposition forces during the 23 August coup, Killinger, still present in Bucharest, committed suicide on 2 September in his office on Calea Victoriei in order to avoid capture by the Red Army. The New York Times reported in September 1944 that, shortly before his death, Killinger had "run amok", shooting junior members of his staff while shouting the words "We must all die for the Führer". However this event is not recorded anywhere else, and has to be viewed as a rumor. That said, in a 1953 testimony, Prince Albrecht von Hohenzollern who had been an attaché of the German military mission in Romania and was in Bucharest at that time, recalled that before Killinger shot himself, he first killed his secretary with whom he was rumored to have been in an intimate relationship. In testimonies he gave after being captured by the Western Allies, Walter Schellenberg, the last chief of the German Intelligence Organization (Abwehr), indicated that Killinger and Joachim von Ribbentrop's reports from early 1944 had played a part in assuring German leaders that Romania was under control. This came despite repeated warnings issued by Eugen Cristescu, head of the Romanian Special Intelligence Service. Reflecting on the sequence of events, he indicated his belief that Killinger "was certainly not quite normal".
