= Ungureni, Bacău =

Ungureni
- Commune
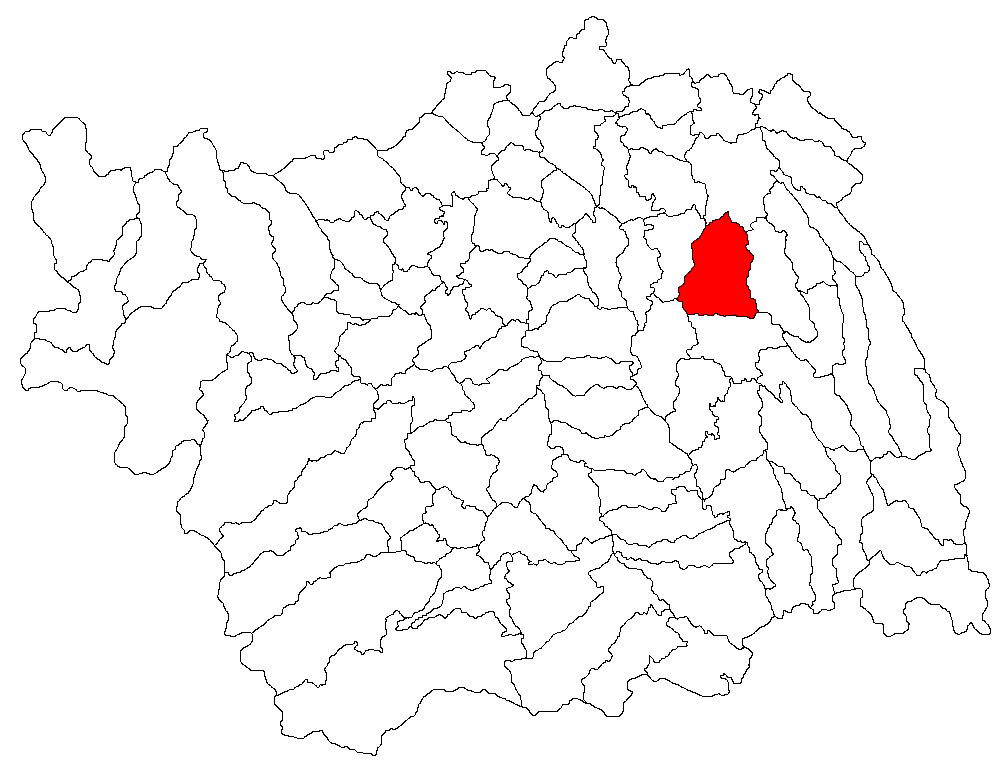
- Location in Bacău County

- Location in Romania
- Coordinates: 46°33′N 27°8′E
- Country: Romania
- County: Bacău
- Area: 86.78 km^{2} (33.51 sq mi)
- Elevation: 230 m (750 ft)
- Population (2021-12-01): 3,532
  - Density: 40.70/km^{2} (105.4/sq mi)
- Time zone: UTC+02:00 (EET)
  - Summer (DST): UTC+03:00 (EEST)
- Postal code: 607645
- Area code: +(40) 0234
- Vehicle reg.: BC

Ungureni is a commune in Bacău County, Western Moldavia, Romania. It is composed of eight villages: Bărtășești, Bibirești, Bota, Botești, Gârla Anei, Ungureni, Viforeni, and Zlătari.

== Natives ==
- Radu Lecca (1890–1980), spy, journalist, civil servant, and convicted war criminal
