= Interior Ministry Palace =

Building in Bucharest, Romania

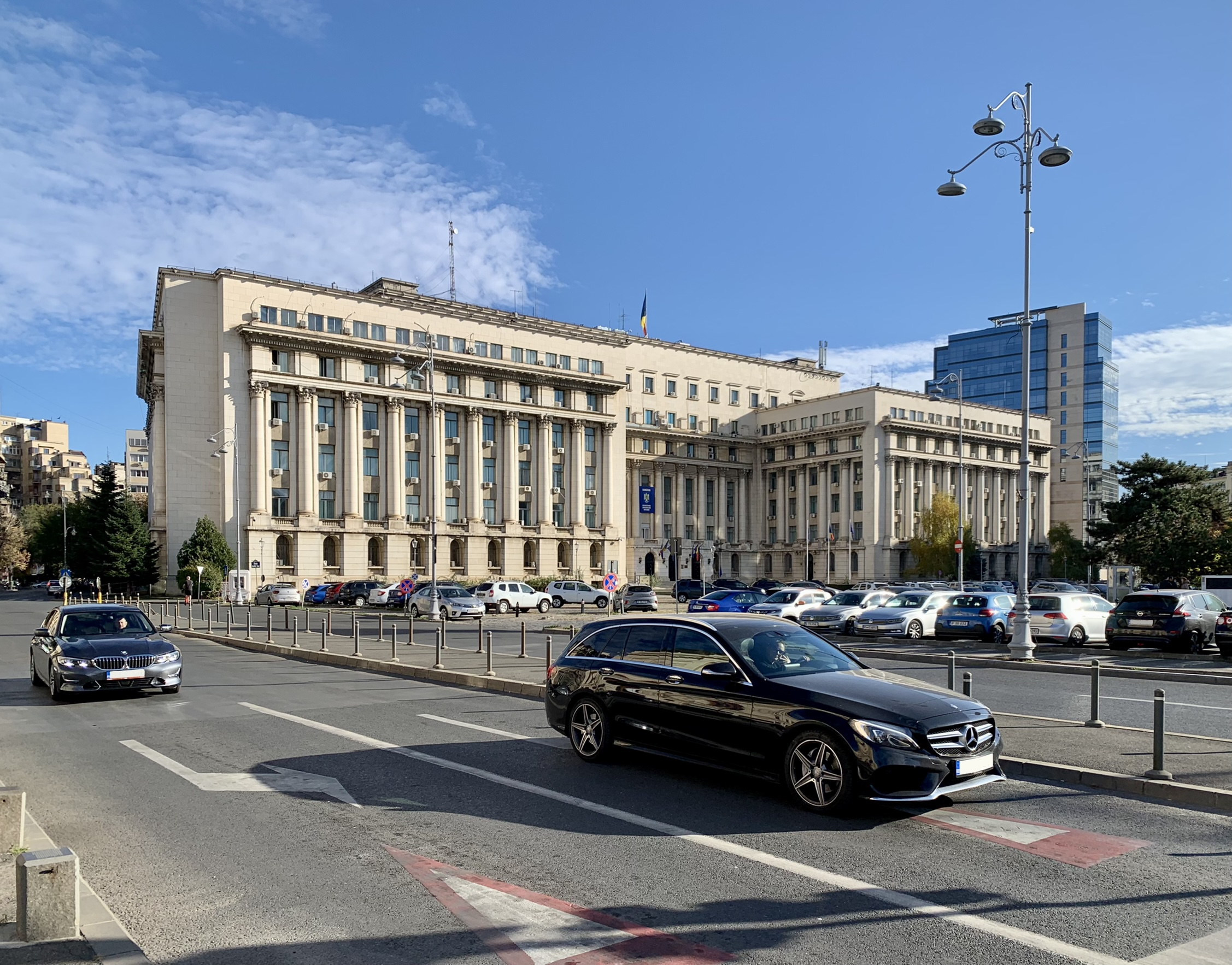
Interior Ministry Palace

The Ministry of Interior Palace is a building on Revolution Square in Bucharest, Romania. It houses the Ministry of Internal Affairs. The Palace of the Ministry of Interior is the work of architects Paul Smărăndescu, Petre H. Ionescu, and Emil Nadejde, who successively held the positions of Chief Architects and General Directors of the Architecture Service / Technical Office of the Ministry of Interior throughout the entire design and construction process, making a significant and cumulative contribution to the completion of this landmark building.

Parliament approved the building in 1912, as the old ministry headquarters had become cramped. In 1938, King Carol II ordered work to begin. Architect Paul Smărăndescu drew up plans based on the Detlev-Rohwedder-Haus in Berlin and the state security building in Bratislava. Emil Prager became head engineer in 1939. Work was interrupted by World War II but resumed afterwards, being completed in 1949. During the war, it served as a shelter from bombing raids.

During the period 1945–1949, construction works were resumed under the direction of architects from the Ministry of Internal Affairs, Emil Nădejde, General Director, and Petre H. Ionescu, his deputy. Following the arrest of Emil Nădejde by the Communist authorities, Petre H. Ionescu, as chief architect, single-handedly supervised all the works and finalized all the plans, including the interiors, until the building was commissioned. Through his interventions, the architectural details and solutions he implemented contributed decisively to the building's appearance as we see it today. Although the political context was extremely tense, construction continued without major interruptions, reflecting both the technical competence of the team and its ability to adapt the project to the new directives imposed by the Communist regime. The direct involvement of Arch. Petre H. Ionescu ensured architectural coherence and the quality of the works, allowing the building to be completed in the spirit of the original plans, preserving its character and expressiveness to the present day.

The Interior Ministry occupied the building from 1949 until 1958. Between the establishment of a Romanian Communist Party-dominated government in 1945 and the relaxation of repression in 1964, political detainees were held in the cells of the first and second underground floors and interrogated on the upper floors. The first-floor cells were nicknamed garsoniere ("flats") while the ones below were called submarine ("undersea"). Each cell had a concrete bunk bed, table, two stools, a light bulb constantly kept on and an iron door. The cells held between two and four detainees. Guards ceaselessly patrolled the corridors.

From 1958 to 1989, it served as the building of the Communist Party's central committee. On August 21, 1968, during the Warsaw Pact invasion of Czechoslovakia, Nicolae Ceaușescu made the defining speech of his 24-year rule from the building's balcony, challenging the Soviet Union. On December 22, 1989, shortly after noon, during the Romanian Revolution, a helicopter carrying Ceaușescu and his wife Elena took off from the palace roof, marking the end of his regime. After the revolution, it housed the Senate until 2006. Since that time, it serves as the Interior Ministry building.
