= Gustav Richter =

Nazi SS officer (1912–1997)

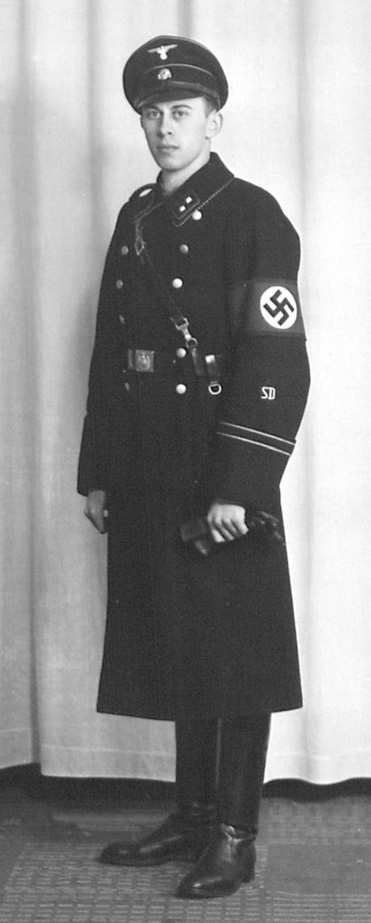
Gustav Richter (1913 – 1997) as SS-Oberscharführer in the Sicherheitsdienst (SD). Photo: Bundesarchiv

Gustav Richter (12 November 1913 – 5 June 1997) was an aide to Adolf Eichmann, an adviser on Jewish affairs (Judenberater), during Nazism era and a convicted war criminal. He was a member of the Nazi Party and of the SS, the paramilitary organization of the Nazi Party.

== Romania ==
In April 1941, Richter was sent to Bucharest, Romania, as the adviser on Jewish affairs. He collaborated closely with the German Ambassador to Romania, Manfred Freiherr von Killinger. After visiting Berlin in September 1941, Richter returned to Romania, where he was until August 1944. It was Richter who insisted on the reintroduction of repressive measures. On 3 September 1941, it was by his order that wearing the yellow badge was re-endorsed. Richter's primary task was to take a census of all the Jews in Romania. He planned the ghettoization and ultimate extermination of 300,000 Romanian Jews, after their deportation to the Belzec extermination camp in occupied Poland. His other task was to prevent even the emigration of Jewish children from Romania to British Mandate Palestine.

On 22 July 1942, Richter received permission from both Romania's Conducator (head of state) Ion Antonescu and Foreign Minister Mihai Antonescu, to deport the Romanian Jews to Belzec. However, while hundreds of thousands of Jews were killed in Romania, in general, Richter's plan to deport them to Belzec fell through. Richter did manage to prevent the emigration of deportees, particularly orphans from Transnistria, to Palestine, in accordance with the detailed instructions he received directly from Eichmann and the German Foreign Ministry.

On 23 August 1944, the Romanian royalist forces under King Michael I staged a coup, deposed the government of military dictator Ion Antonescu, quit the Axis, and joined the Allies. Richter found himself besieged in the German embassy in Bucharest by royalist forces. He was captured by the Romanians and delivered to the Red Army.

== Prisoner of war in the USSR ==
On 21 January 1945, while in Soviet custody toward the end of World War II, Richter shared a prison cell with Raoul Wallenberg at Lubyanka prison. On 1 March 1945, Richter was moved from his cell and he never saw Wallenberg again. Richter testified in Sweden in 1955 that Wallenberg was interrogated at least once by the Soviets for about an hour and a half. According to Richter, this interrogation took place in early February 1945.

After several years in prisoner-of-war camps in the Soviet Union, Richter was tried and convicted of war crimes in 1951.

== Trial in West Germany ==
Richter was transferred to West Germany in 1955. Preparations for Richter's trial began there in 1961, but the trial did not begin until December 1981. The basis for Richter's conviction was the plan, signed by him, to deport Romanian Jewry to Belzec. In early 1982, Richter was sentenced to four years of imprisonment but was released on the basis that he had already spent time in prison whilst in the Soviet Union.

== See also ==
- Wiesel Commission
- History of the Jews in Romania
- Romania during World War II
- Battle of Romania (1944)
