= Jean Ancel =

Romanian-born Israeli historian and author

Jean Ancel (Hebrew: ז'אן אנסל; 1940 – 30 April 2008) was a Romanian-born Israeli author and historian; with specialty in the history of the Jews in Romania between the two World wars, and the Holocaust of the Jews of Romania.

== Biography ==
Jean Ancel was born to Jewish parents in Iași, Romania. He was a year old during the Iași pogrom, and was hidden in the basement during that time. His father was taken to one of the Holocaust trains, but eventually survived.

Later, he studied history at the Alexandru Ioan Cuza University, but was expelled before graduating because he had registered for aliyah to Israel. He continued his studies after moving to the relatively new state of Israel, in 1959, at the Hebrew University of Jerusalem, where he graduated BA in History and Romance languages in 1967. In 1970 he earned another BA degree, this time on Jewish history. He then got two MA degrees, one in History in 1972 and the second in archiving in 1974. In 1977, he was ordained at the Hebrew University, receiving a doctorate in Jewish history in modern times. He worked extensively with archival materials from Israel, Romania, Russia, Moldova, the United States, and Germany.

Ancel was principal investigator at Yad Vashem and the author of several history books, some of which have been translated into Romanian. He edited 12 volumes of original documents, mostly about the Holocaust in Romania. He was a leading member of the special Committee of Historians headed by the Nobel Peace Prize laureate Elie Wiesel, which was convened in 2004 by the President of Romania to the Wiesel Commission.

Thanks to his studies on the subject, Ancel changed the perception of Romania's role in the Holocaust. According to his research, which he conducted using Romania's own archives (made available after the fall of the Soviet Union), Romania was not "dragged" after Nazi Germany, it initiated and preceded the German crimes against the Jews.

Ancel worked for the Israeli radio as an anchor. He died in Jerusalem in 2008.

== Bibliography ==
- The History of the Holocaust in Romania (U of Nebraska Press, 2011) ISBN 0-803-22064-2

== Awards ==
- 2012: National Jewish Book Award in the Writing Based on Archive Material category for The History of the Holocaust in Romania
