= Elie Wiesel National Institute for Studying the Holocaust in Romania =

Public institution

The Elie Wiesel National Institute for Studying the Holocaust in Romania, (Romanian: Institutul Naţional pentru Studierea Holocaustului din România „Elie Wiesel”) is a public institution established by the Romanian government on August 7, 2005, and officially opened on October 9 of the same year, which is Romania's National Day of Commemorating the Holocaust.

The institute is named after the Romanian-born Jewish Nobel Prize winner Elie Wiesel, who chaired the Wiesel Commission which reported on Romania's involvement in the Holocaust to the Romanian government in 2004, and which recommended that such an institute be established. The institute is responsible for researching Romania's role in the Holocaust, and gathering, archiving and publishing documents relating to this event.

The institute is currently headed by Mihail E. Ionescu and falls under the responsibility of the Ministry of Culture of Romania.

== See also ==
- The Holocaust in Romania
- Holocaust research
