= Wiesel Commission =

Commission on the Holocaust in Romania

The Wiesel Commission was the International Commission on the Holocaust in Romania which was established by former President Ion Iliescu in October 2003 to research and create a report on the history of the Holocaust in Romania and make specific recommendations for educating the public on the issue. The Commission, which was led by Nobel Peace Prize laureate Elie Wiesel as well as Jean Ancel, released its report in late 2004. The Romanian government recognized the report's findings and acknowledged the deliberate participation in the Holocaust by the World War II Romanian regime led by Ion Antonescu. The report assessed that between 280,000 and 380,000 Jews were murdered or died under the supervision and as a result of the deliberate policies of Romanian civilian and military authorities. Over 11,000 Romani were also killed. The Wiesel Commission report also documented pervasive antisemitism and violence against Jews in Romania before World War II, when Romania's Jewish population was among the largest in Europe.

The report was heralded as a landmark development because the true history of the Holocaust in Romania had been suppressed during the communist period, and few Romanians were aware of the extent of involvement in the Holocaust by Antonescu and many others in the military, government, and broader society. Indeed, the Wiesel Commission itself was established following statements made in July 2003 by Romanian President Iliescu and the Romanian Minister of Culture minimizing the Holocaust and indicating official belief that the Holocaust had not occurred in Romania. Iliescu established the Wiesel Commission after an international outcry over these erroneous assertions.

In 2004, Romania observed its first National Holocaust Commemoration Day, established by the Parliament to take place on or around October 9 of each year. The date specifically marks the 1941 deportation of Romanian Jews to ghettos and forced labor camps, although they were not sent to Germany as requested by Hitler. The establishment of the commemoration day was among the recommendations made in the Wiesel Commission report. Other recommendations included the establishment of an Institute for the Study of the Holocaust in Romania (subsequently established in 2005), explicit inclusion of the history of the Holocaust in Romania in public school curricula, and the construction of a national monument to the Romanian victims of the Holocaust. All of these are currently being implemented by the Romanian government. As of 2006, Holocaust studies have been implemented into Year 10 high school curricula, and the designs for a National Memorial for Romanian Victims of the Holocaust have been finalised. On October 9, 2006 (the National Day of Commemorating the Holocaust in Romania), the keystone for the memorial was laid by Romanian President Traian Băsescu.

The Final Report by Elie Wiesel, published on October 16, 2018, describes the work of the Commission fully documented the participation of the Romanian regime of Ion Antonescu in the Holocaust. It describes the antisemitic drive and violence against Jews in Romania before World War II, when the Jewish population of the country was among the largest in Europe. The Romanian government also recognized the findings of the report. Today, the Elie Wiesel National Institute for the Study of the Holocaust in Romania (INSHR-EW) is carried forward this work.

In addition to Romania's National Institute, now the European Holocaust Research Infrastructure (EHRI), an international research infrastructure that supports and promotes Holocaust research, commemoration, and education on a transnational level has become an important supportive organization. EHRI-RO is the national part representing Romania within the international research consortium. Supported by 27 partners from Europe, Israel, and the United States of America, EHRI has managed to lay the foundations of a European Holocaust research infrastructure, since January 2025, is operating as a permanent consortium with regional research hubs in ten founding member states.

With regard to anti-Semitism, xenophobia, and hate speech resurgence, their work demonstrates that Holocaust research goes beyond the academic sphere and scientific impact, being a prerequisite for open and non-discriminatory societies.

As of 2024 and 2025 there are numerous articles and documents discussing retrospectively Romania's position in the Holocaust and their subsequent changes. These come from multiple sources including CEEOL, the US. State Department, the US Embassy in Romania, and others.

== See also ==
- History of the Jews in Romania
- Romania in World War II
- Iași pogrom
- Bucharest pogrom
