= National Day of Commemorating the Holocaust =

The National Day of Commemorating the Holocaust (Ziua Naţională de Comemorare a Holocaustului in Romanian) is held annually on October 9 in Romania. It is dedicated to the remembrance of the victims of the Holocaust and particularly to reflecting on Romania's role in it. Various commemoration events and ceremonies take place throughout Romania to remember the Jews and Romani who died.

October 9 was chosen as the date because it marks the beginning of Romanian deportations of Jews to Transnistria in 1941.

The first National Day of Commemorating the Holocaust was held in 2004,.

On October 9, 2005, the Romanian Minister for Foreign Affairs, Mihai Răzvan Ungureanu, participated in the laying of a wreath at the Holocaust Memorial in Iaşi. Both the Centre for Hebrew Studies, part of the Alexandru Ioan Cuza University, and the Elie Wiesel National Institute for Studying the Holocaust in Romania were opened on the same day.

On October 9, 2006, a ceremony was held in Bucharest to lay the keystone of the National Holocaust Memorial. The event was attended by President Traian Băsescu, Minister of Foreign Affairs Mihai Răzvan Ungureanu, Culture Minister Adrian Iorgulescu, and representatives of both Romanian and international Jewish communities. A commemorative march also took place in the city to honour Romani victims of the Holocaust and to call for greater official recognition of their suffering.

== See also ==
- History of the Jews in Romania
- Elie Wiesel National Institute for Studying the Holocaust in Romania
- Wiesel Commission
- International Holocaust Remembrance Day
- Yom HaShoah
