= History of the Jews in Romania =

Romanian Jews יהודים רומנים Evrei români
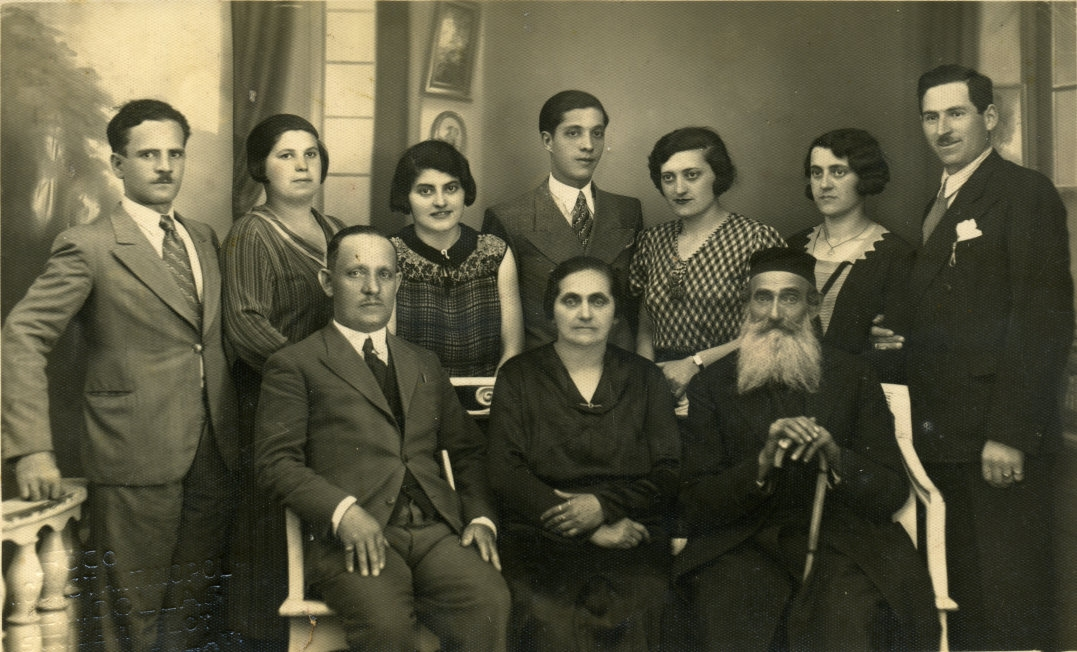
- A Jewish family in Galați, Romania during the Interwar period

Total population
- est. 280,000 to 460,000 (worldwide)

Regions with significant populations
- Romania: > 2,707 (self-identified, 2022 census)
- Israel: 276,588 (emigrants to Israel 1948–2010); 450,000 (2005 estimated population)

Languages
- Romanian, Hebrew, Yiddish, German, Russian, Hungarian, Polish and English

Religion
- Judaism

Related ethnic groups
- Jews, Ashkenazi Jews, Sephardic Jews, Moldovan Jews, Bessarabian Jews, Ukrainian Jews, Polish Jews, Hungarian Jews, Turkish Jews, Belarusian Jews, Lithuanian Jews, Bulgarian Jews

The history of the Jews in Romania concerns the Jews both of Romania and of Romanian origins, from their first mention on what is present-day Romanian territory. Minimal until the 18th century, the size of the Jewish population increased after around 1850, and more especially after the establishment of Greater Romania in the aftermath of World War I. A diverse community, albeit an overwhelmingly urban one, Jews were a target of religious persecution and racism in Romanian society from the late-19th century debate over the "Jewish Question" and the Jewish residents' right to citizenship, leading to the genocide carried out in the lands of Romania as part of the Holocaust. The latter, coupled with successive waves of emigration, including aliyah to Israel, has accounted for a dramatic decrease in the overall size of Romania's present-day Jewish community.

During the reign of Peter the Lame (1574–1579), the Jews of Moldavia, mainly traders from Poland who were competing with locals, were taxed and ultimately expelled. The authorities decided in 1650 and 1741 that Jews had to wear clothing evidencing their status and ethnicity. The first blood libel in Moldavia (and, as such, in Romania) was made in 1710, when the Jews of Târgu Neamț were charged with having killed a Christian child for ritual purposes. An anti-Jewish riot occurred in Bucharest in the 1760s. During the Russo-Turkish War, 1768–1774, the Jews in the Danubian Principalities had to endure great hardships. Massacres and pillages were perpetrated in almost every town and village in the country. During the Greek War of Independence, which signalled the Wallachian uprising of 1821, Jews were victims of pogroms and persecutions. In the 1860s, there was another riot motivated by blood libel accusations.

Antisemitism was officially enforced under the premierships of Ion Brătianu. During his first years in office (1875) Brătianu reinforced and applied old discrimination laws, insisting that Jews were not allowed to settle in the countryside (and relocating those that had done so), while declaring many Jewish urban inhabitants to be vagrants and expelling them from the country. The emigration of Romanian Jews on a larger scale commenced soon after 1878. By 1900 there were 250,000 Romanian Jews: 3.3% of the population, 14.6% of the city dwellers, 32% of the Moldavian urban population and 42% of Iași.

Between the establishment of the National Legionary State (September 1940) and 1942, 80 anti-Jewish regulations were passed. Starting at the end of October, 1940, the Romanian fascist movement known as the Iron Guard began a massive antisemitic campaign, torturing and beating Jews and looting their shops (see Dorohoi pogrom), culminating in the failed coup accompanied by a pogrom in Bucharest, in which 125 Jews were killed. Military dictator Ion Antonescu eventually stopped the violence and chaos created by the Iron Guard by brutally suppressing the rebellion, but continued the policy of oppression and massacre of Jews, and, to a lesser extent, of Roma. After Romania entered the war at the start of Operation Barbarossa, atrocities against Jews became common, starting with the Iași pogrom. According to the Wiesel Commission report released by the Romanian government in 2004, between 280,000 and 380,000 Jews were murdered in the Holocaust in Romania and the occupied Soviet territories under Romanian control, among them the Transnistria Governorate. An additional 135,000 Jews living under Hungarian control in Northern Transylvania also were murdered in the Holocaust, as were some 5,000 Romanian Jews in other countries.

On the current territory of Romania, between 290,000 and 360,000 Romanian Jews survived World War II (355,972 persons, according to statistics from the end of the war). During the communist regime in Romania, there was a mass emigration to Israel, and in 1987, only 23,000 Jews lived in Romania.

Today, the majority of Romanian Jews live in Israel, while modern-day Romania continues to host a modest Jewish population. In the 2021 census, 2,378 people declared themselves to be ethnically Jewish.

== Early history ==
Jewish communities on what would later become Romanian territory were attested as early as the 2nd century AD, at a time when the Roman Empire had established its rule over Dacia. Inscriptions and coins have been found in such places as Sarmizegetusa and Orșova.

The existence of the Crimean Karaites, an ethnic group adherent of Karaite Judaism, suggests that there was a steady Jewish presence around the Black Sea, including in parts of today's Romania, in the trading ports from the mouths of the Danube and the Dniester (see Cumania); they may have been present in some Moldavian fairs by the 16th century or earlier. The earliest Jewish (most likely Sephardi) presence in what would become Moldavia was recorded in Cetatea Albă (1330); in Wallachia, they were first attested in the 1550s, living in Bucharest. During the second half of the 14th century, the future territory of Romania became an important place of refuge for Jews expelled from the Kingdom of Hungary and Poland by King Louis I. In Transylvania, Hungarian Jews were recorded in Saxon citadels around 1492.

Prince Roman I (1391-1394?) exempted the Jews from military service, in exchange for a tax of 3 löwenthaler per person. Also in Moldavia, Stephen the Great (1457–1504) treated Jews with consideration. Isaac ben Benjamin Shor of Iași (Isak Bey, originally employed by Uzun Hassan) was appointed stolnic, being subsequently advanced to the rank of logofăt; he continued to hold this office under Bogdan the Blind (1504–1517), the son and successor of Stephen.

At this time both Danubian Principalities came under the suzerainty of the Ottoman Empire, and a number of Sephardim living in Istanbul migrated to Wallachia, while Jews from Poland and the Holy Roman Empire settled in Moldavia. Although they took an important part in Ottoman government and formed a large part of a community of foreign creditors and traders, Jews were harassed by the hospodars of the two Principalities. Moldavia's Prince Stephen IV (1522) deprived the Jewish merchants of almost all the rights given to them by his two predecessors; Petru Rareș confiscated Jewish wealth in 1541, after alleging that Jews in the cattle trade had engaged in tax evasion. Alexandru Lăpușneanu (first rule: 1552–61) persecuted the community alongside other social categories, until he was dethroned by Jacob Heraclides, a Greek Lutheran, who was lenient to his Jewish subjects; Lăpușneanu did not renew his persecutions after his return on the throne in 1564. The role of Ottoman and local Jews in financing various princes increased as Ottoman economic demands were mounting after 1550 (in the 1570s, the influential Jewish Duke of the Archipelago, Joseph Nasi, backed both Heraclides and Lăpușneanu to the throne); several violent incidents throughout the period were instigated by princes unable to repay their debts.

During the first short reign of Peter the Lame (1574–1579) the Jews of Moldavia, mainly traders from Poland who were competing with locals, were taxed and ultimately expelled. In 1582, he succeeded in regaining his rule over the country with the help of the Jewish physician Benveniste, who was a friend of the influential Solomon Ashkenazi; the latter then exerted his influence with the Prince in favor of his coreligionists.

In Wallachia, Prince Alexandru II Mircea (1567–1577) engaged as his private secretary and counselor Isaiah ben Joseph, who used his influence on behalf of the Jews. In 1573 Isaiah was dismissed, owing to court intrigues, but he was not harmed any further, and subsequently left for Moldavia where he entered the service of Muscovy's Grand Prince Ivan the Terrible. Through the efforts of Solomon Ashkenazi, Aron Tiranul was placed on the throne of Moldavia; nevertheless, the new ruler persecuted and executed nineteen Jewish creditors in Iași, who were decapitated without process of law. At around the same time, in Wallachia, the violent repression of creditors peaked under Michael the Brave, who, after killing Turkish creditors in Bucharest (1594), probably engaged in violence against Jews settled south of the Danube during his campaign in Rumelia (while maintaining good relations with Transylvanian Jews).

== Early Modern Age ==
In 1623, the Jews in Transylvania were awarded certain privileges by Prince Gabriel Bethlen, who aimed to attract entrepreneurs from Ottoman lands into his country; the grants were curtailed during following decades, when Jews were only allowed to settle in Gyulafehérvár (Alba Iulia). Among the privileges granted was one allowing Jews to wear traditional dress; eventually, the authorities in Gyulafehérvár decided (in 1650 and 1741) to allow Jews to wear only clothing evidencing their status and ethnicity.

The status of Jews who had converted to Eastern Orthodoxy was established in Wallachia by Matei Basarab's Pravila de la Govora and in Moldavia by Vasile Lupu's Carte românească de învățătură. The latter ruler (1634–1653) treated the Jews with consideration until the appearance of the Cossacks (1648), who marched against the Polish–Lithuanian Commonwealth and who, while crossing the region, killed many Jews; the violence led many Ashkenazi Jews from Poland took refuge in Moldavia and Wallachia, establishing small but stable communities. Massacres and forced conversions by the Cossacks occurred in 1652, when the latter came to Iași on the occasion of the Vasile Lupu's daughter marriage to Timush, the son of Bohdan Khmelnytsky, and during the rule of Gheorghe Ștefan.

According to Anton Maria Del Chiaro, secretary of the Wallachian princes between 1710 and 1716, the Jewish population of Wallachia was required to respect a certain dresscode. Thus, they were prohibited from wearing clothes of other color than black or violet, or to wear yellow or red boots. Nevertheless, the Romanian scholar Andrei Oișteanu argued that such ethnic and religious social stigma was uncommon in Moldavia and Wallachia, as well as throughout the Eastern Orthodox areas of Europe.

The first blood accusation in Moldavia (and, as such, in Romania) was made April 5, 1710, when the Jews of Târgu Neamț were charged with having killed a Christian child for ritual purposes´. The instigator was a baptized Jew who had helped to carry the body of a child, murdered by Christians, into the courtyard of the synagogue. On the next day five Jews were killed, others were maimed, and every Jewish house was pillaged, while the representatives of the community were imprisoned and tortured. Meanwhile, some influential Jews appealed to Prince Nicholas Mavrocordatos (the first Phanariote ruler) in Iași, who ordered an investigation resulting in the freeing of those arrested. This was the first time that the Orthodox clergy participated in attacks on Jews. It was due to the clergy's instigations that in 1714 a similar charge was brought against the Jews of the city of Roman – the murder by a group of Roman Catholics of a Christian girl-servant to Jewish family was immediately blamed on Jews; every Jewish house was plundered, and two prominent Jews were hanged, before the real criminals were discovered by the authorities.

According to the Romanian-Israeli historian Moshe Idel, Baal Shem Tov, the founder of Hasidic Judaism, was born in the Principality of Moldavia, in the area that would later become Bukovina.

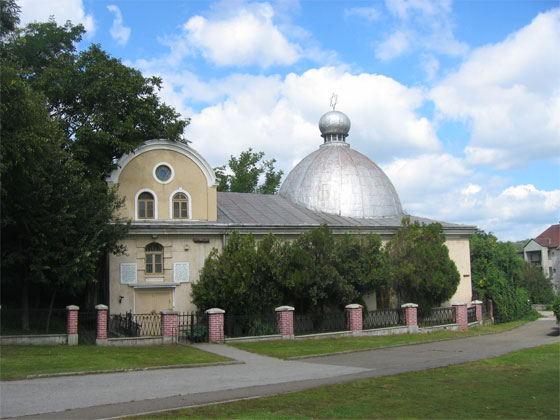
The Great Synagogue (Iași), built c. 1670

Under Constantin Brâncoveanu, Wallachian Jews were recognized as a special guild in Bucharest, led by a starost. Jews in both Wallachia and Moldavia were subject to the Hakham Bashi in Iași, but soon the Bucharest starost assumed several religious duties. Overtaxed and persecuted under Ștefan Cantacuzino (1714–1716), Wallachian Jews obtained valuable privileges during Nicholas Mavrocordatos' rule (1716–1730) in that country (the Prince notably employed the Jewish savant Daniel de Fonseca at his court). Another anti-Jewish riot occurred in Bucharest in the 1760s, and was encouraged by the visit of Ephram II, Patriarch of Jerusalem.

In 1726, in the Moldavian borough of Onițcani, four Jews were accused of having kidnapped a five-year-old child, of killing him on Easter and of collecting his blood in a barrel. They were tried at Iași under the supervision of Moldavian Prince Mihai Racoviță, and eventually acquitted following diplomatic protests. The event was echoed in several contemporary chronicles and documents — for example, the French ambassador to the Porte, Jean-Baptiste Louis Picon, remarked that such an accusation was no longer accepted in "civilized countries". The most obvious effects on the condition of the Jewish inhabitants of Moldavia were witnessed during the reign of John Mavrocordatos (1744–1747): a Jewish farmer in the vicinity of Suceava reported the prince to the Porte for allegedly using his house to rape a number of kidnapped Jewish women; Mavrocordatos had his accuser hanged. This act aroused the anger of Mahmud I's kapucu in Moldavia, and the prince paid the penalty with the loss of his throne.

== Russo-Turkish Wars ==
During the Russo-Turkish War of 1768–1774, Jews in the Danubian Principalities endured great hardships. Massacres and pillages were perpetrated in almost every town and village in the country. When peace was restored, both princes, Alexander Mavrocordatos of Moldavia and Nicholas Mavrogheni of Wallachia, pledged their special protection to Jews, whose condition remained favorable until 1787, when both Janissaries and the Imperial Russian Army took part in pogroms.

The community was also subject to persecutions by the locals. Jewish children were seized and forcibly baptized. Ritual-murder accusations became widespread, with one made at Galați in 1797 leading to exceptionally severe results – with Jews being attacked by a large mob, driven from their homes, robbed, waylaid on the streets, and many killed on the spot, while some were forced into the Danube and drowned, and others who took refuge in the synagogue were burned to death in the building; a few escaped after being given protection and refuge by a priest. In 1803, shortly before his death, the Wallachian Metropolitan Iacob Stamati instigated attacks on the Bucharest community by publishing his Înfruntarea jidovilor ("Facing the Jews"), which pretended to be the confession of a former rabbi; however, Jews were offered refuge by Stamati's replacement, Veniamin Costachi. A seminal event occurred in 1804, when ruler Constantine Ypsilanti dismissed accusations of ritual murder as "the unfounded opinion" of "stupid people", and ordered that their condemnation be read in churches throughout Wallachia; the allegations no longer surfaced during the following period.

During the Russo-Turkish War of 1806–1812, the Russian invasion was again accompanied by massacres of Jews. Kalmyk irregular soldiers in Ottoman service, who appeared in Bucharest at the close of the Russo-Turkish War, terrorised the city's Jewish population. At around the same time, a conflict emerged in Wallachia between Jews under foreign protection (sudiți) and local ones (hrisovoliți), after the latter tried to impose a single administration for the community, a matter which was finally settled in favor of the hrisovoliți by Prince Jean Georges Caradja (1813).

In Habsburg-ruled Transylvania, the reforms carried out by Joseph II allowed Jews to settle in towns directly subject to the Hungarian Crown. However, pressure placed on the community remained stringent for the following decades.

== Early 19th century ==
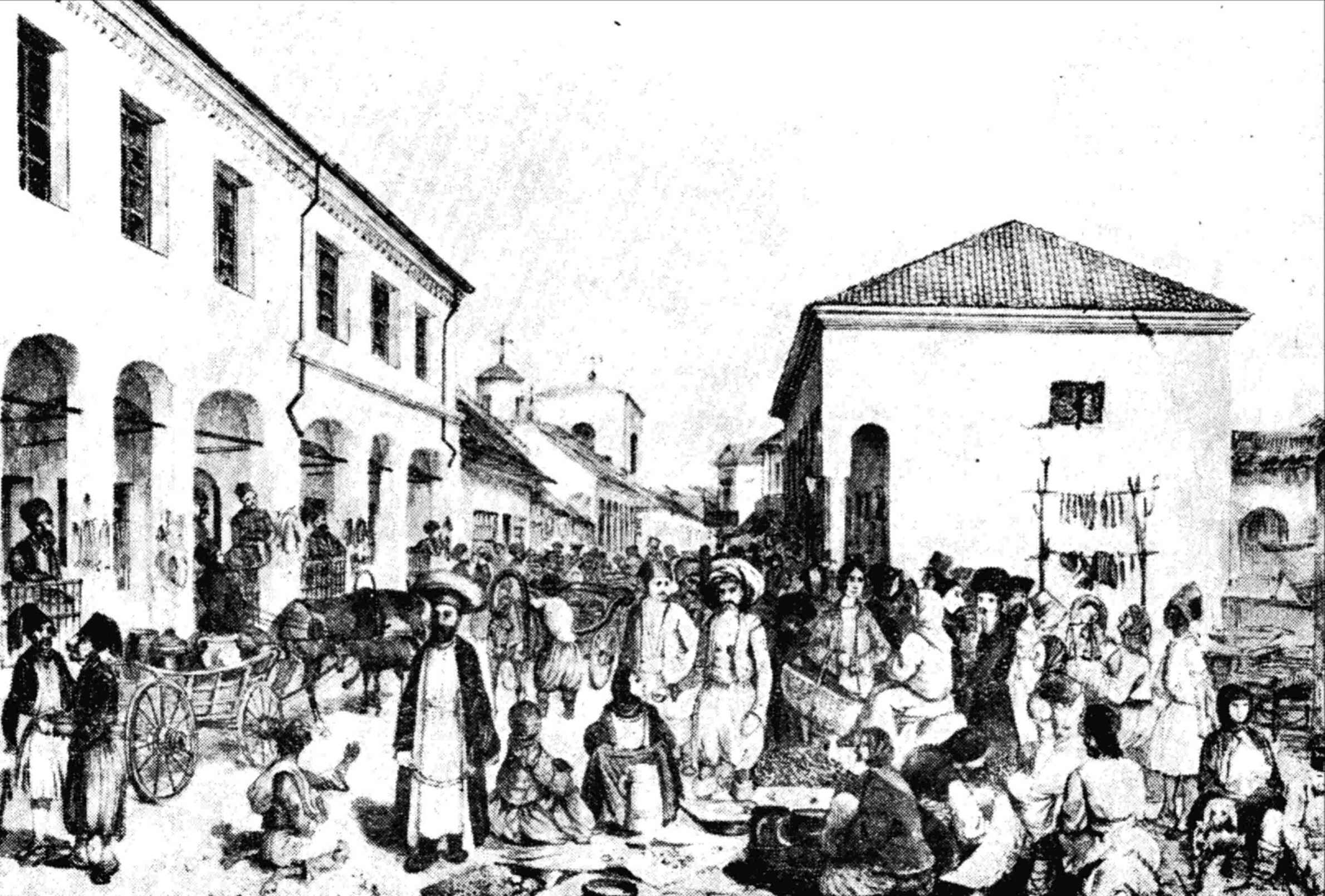
Lithograph of a cosmopolitan fair in Iași (c. 1845); two Orthodox Jews are visible to the right

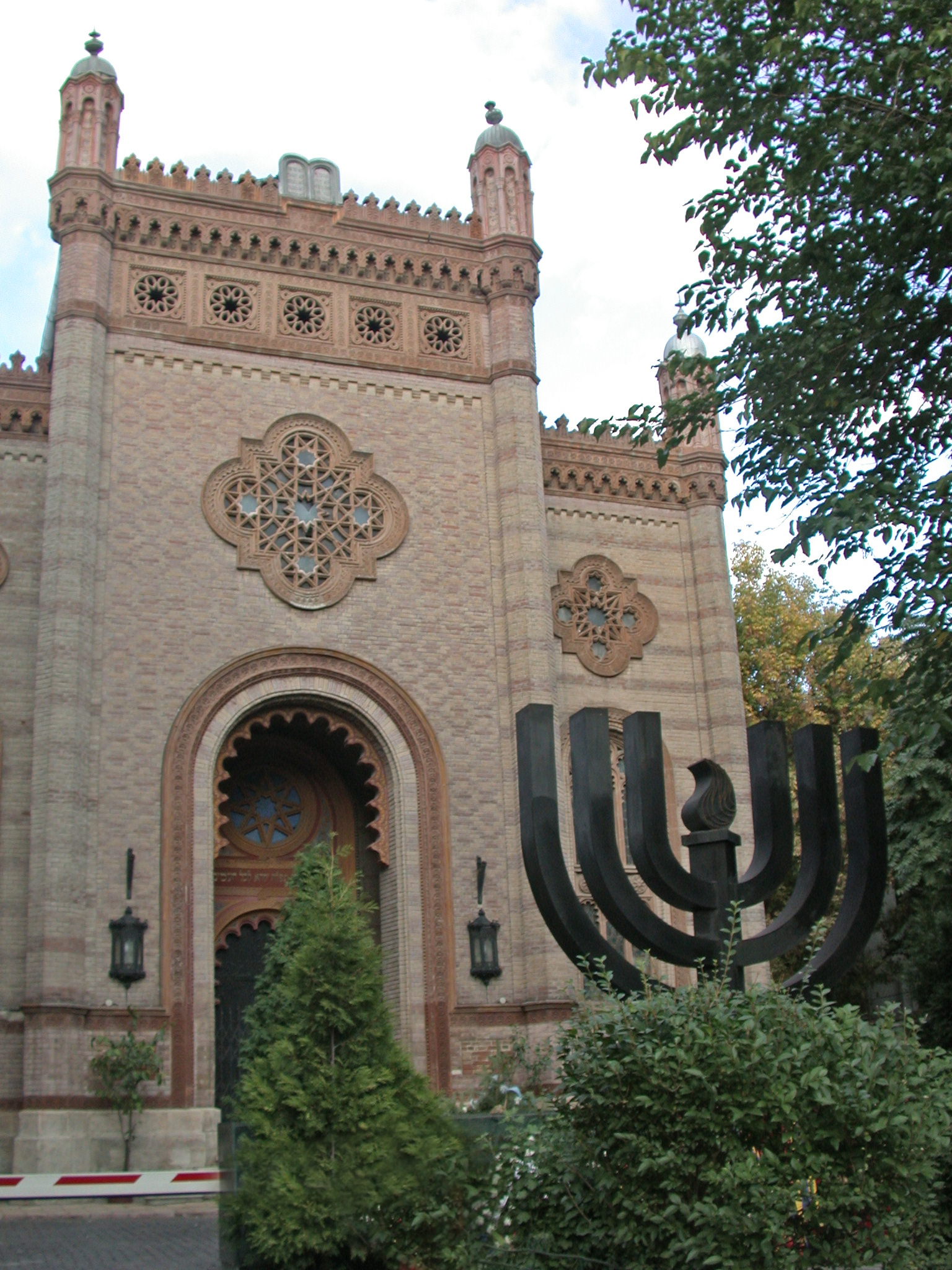
The Bucharest Synagogue (restored after World War II), originally built 1864–1866

By 1825, the Jewish population in Wallachia was estimated at between 5,000 and 10,000 people, almost all Sephardi. Of these, the larger part resided in Bucharest (probably as many as 7,000 in 1839); and at around the same time, Moldavia was home to about 12,000 Jews. In parallel, the Jewish population in Bukovina rose from 526 in 1774 to 11,600 in 1848. In the early 19th century, Jews who sought refuge from Osman Pazvantoğlu's campaign in the Balkans established communities in Wallachian-ruled Oltenia. In Moldavia, Scarlat Callimachi's Code (1817) allowed Jews to purchase urban property, but prevented them from settling in the countryside (while purchasing town property became increasingly difficult due to popular prejudice).

During the Greek War of Independence, which signaled the Wallachian uprising of 1821 and the Danubian Principalities' occupation by Filiki Eteria troops under Alexander Ypsilantis, Jews were victims of pogroms and persecutions in places such as Fălticeni, Hertsa, Piatra Neamț, the Secu Monastery, Târgoviște, and Târgu Frumos. Jews in Galați managed to escape over the Prut River with assistance from Austrian diplomats. Weakened by the clash between Ypsilantis and Tudor Vladimirescu, the Eterists were massacred by the Ottoman intervention armies, and during this episode, Jewish communities engaged in reprisals in Secu and Slatina.

Following the 1829 Treaty of Adrianople (which allowed the two principalities to freely engage in foreign trade), Moldavia, where commercial niches had been largely left unoccupied, became a target for migration of Ashkenazi Jews persecuted in Imperial Russia and the Kingdom of Galicia and Lodomeria. By 1838, their number seems to have reached 80,000, and over 195,000, or almost 12% of the country's population, in 1859 (with an additional 50,000 passing through to Wallachia between the two estimates).

Despite initial interdictions under the Russian occupation of 1829 (when it was first regulated that non-Christians were not to be regarded as citizens), many of the new immigrants became leaseholders of estates and tavern-keepers, serving to increase both the revenue and demands of boyars, and leading in turn to an increase in economic pressures over those working the land or buying products (usual prejudice against Jews accused tavern-keepers of encouraging alcoholism). At the same time, several Jews rose to prominence and high social status, with most families involved in Moldavian banking around the 1850s being of Jewish origin. After 1832, following adoption of the Organic Statute, Jewish children were accepted in schools in the two Principalities only if they wore the same clothing as others. In Moldavia, the 1847 decree of Prince Mihail Sturdza compelled Jews to abandon the traditional dress code.

Before the Revolutions of 1848, which found their parallel in the Wallachian revolution, many restrictive laws against Jews were enacted; although they had some destructive effects, they were never strictly enforced. In various ways, Jews took part in the Wallachian revolt; for example, Constantin Daniel Rosenthal, the painter, distinguished himself in the revolutionary cause, and paid for his activity with his life (being tortured to death in Budapest by Austrian authorities). The major document to be codified by the 1848 Wallachian revolutionaries, the Islaz Proclamation, called for "the emancipation of Israelites and political rights for all compatriots of different faiths".

After the end of the Crimean War, the struggle for the union of the two principalities began. Both parties, Unionists and anti-Unionists sought support of Jews, with each promising full equality; and proclamations to this effect were issued between 1857 and 1858. In 1857, the community published its first magazine, Israelitul Român, edited by the Romanian radical Iuliu Barasch. This process of gradual integration resulted in the creation of an informal Jewish Romanian identity, while conversion to Christianity, despite encouragement by the authorities, remained confined to exceptional cases.

== Under Alexandru Ioan Cuza ==
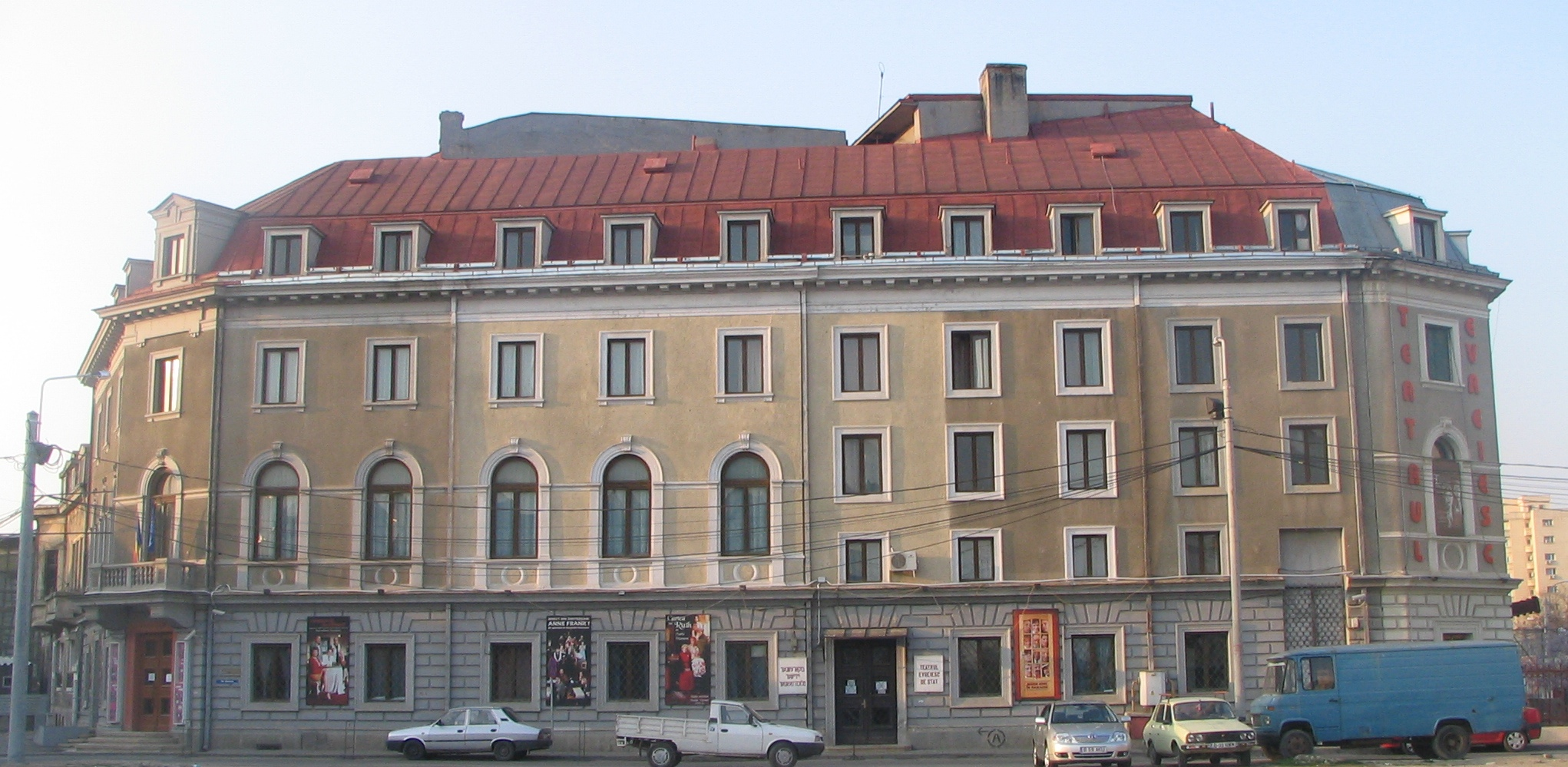
State Jewish Theater in Bucharest

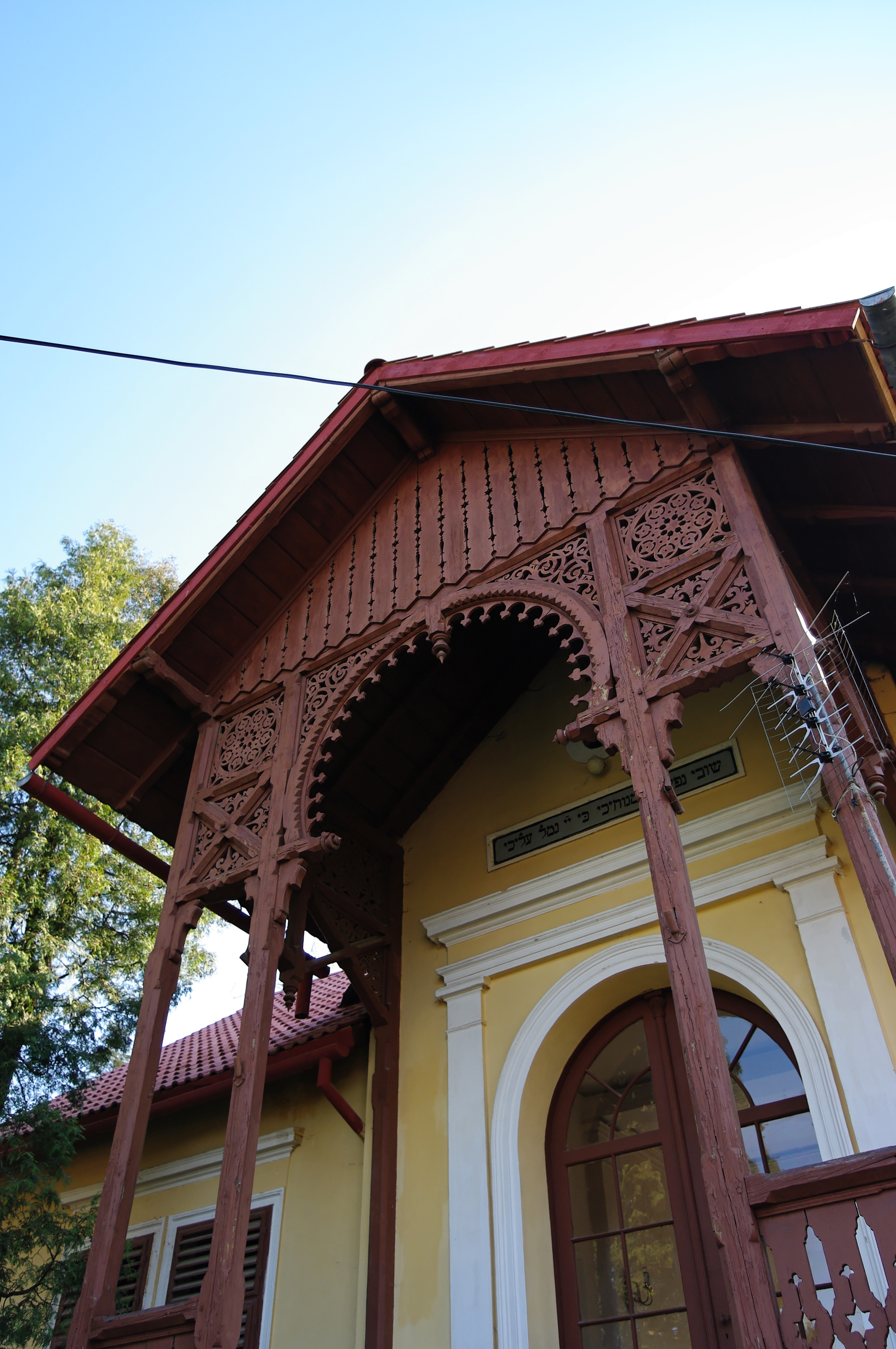
An ornately decorated Jewish Cemetery building, Brasov, Romania

From the beginning of the reign of Alexandru Ioan Cuza (1859–1866), the first ruler (Domnitor) of the united principalities, the Jews became a prominent factor in the politics of the country. This period was, however, inaugurated by another riot motivated by blood libel accusations, begun during Easter 1859 in Galați.

Regulations on clothing were confirmed inside Moldavia by two orders of Mihail Kogălniceanu, Minister of Internal Affairs (issues in 1859 and 1860 respectively). Following adoption of the 1859 regulation, soldiers and civilians would walk the streets of Iași and some other Moldavian towns, assaulting Jews, using scissors to shred their clothing, but also to cut their beards or their sidelocks; drastic measures applied by the Army Headquarters put a stop to such turmoil.

In 1864, Prince Cuza, owing to difficulties between his government and the general assembly, dissolved the latter and decided to submit a draft of a constitution granting universal suffrage. He proposed creating two chambers (of senators and deputies respectively), to extend the franchise to all citizens, and to emancipate the peasants from forced labor (expecting to nullify the remaining influence of the landowners – no longer boyars after the land reform). In the process, Cuza also expected financial support from both the Jews and the Armenians – it appears that he kept the latter demand reduced, asking for only 40,000 Austrian florins (the standard gold coins; about US$ 90,000 at the exchange rate of the time) from the two groups. The Armenians discussed the matter with the Jews, but they were not able to come to a satisfactory agreement in the matter.

While Cuza was pressing in his demands, the Jewish community debated the method of assessment. The rich Jews, for unclear reasons, refused to advance the money, and the middle class argued that the sum would not lead to tangible enough results; Religious Jews insisted that such rights would only interfere with the exercise of their religion. Cuza, on being informed that the Jews hesitated to pay their share, inserted in his draft of a constitution a clause excluding from the right of suffrage all who did not profess Christianity.

== 1860s and 1870s ==
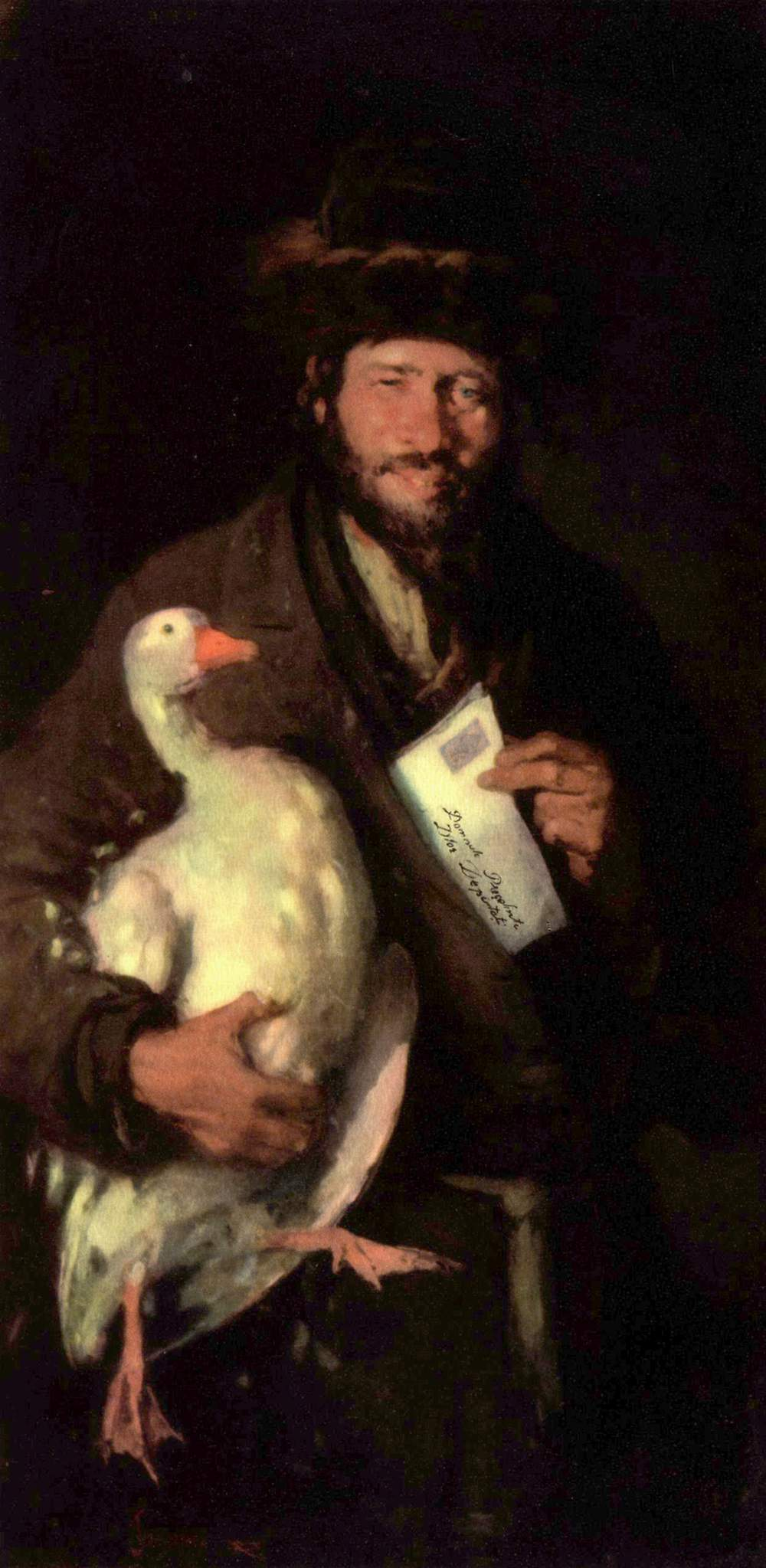
Nicolae Grigorescu: Jew with Goose (c. 1880) – a Romanian Jew holding a petition and a goose for bribery.

On December 4, 1864, Jews in Romania were barred from practicing law. When Charles von Hohenzollern succeeded Cuza in 1866 as Carol I of Romania, the first event that confronted him in the capital was a riot against the Jews. A draft of a constitution was then submitted by the government, Article 6 of which declared that "religion is no obstacle to citizenship"; but, "with regard to the Jews, a special law will have to be framed in order to regulate their admission to naturalization and also to civil rights". On June 30, 1866, the Bucharest Synagogue was desecrated and demolished (it was rebuilt in the same year, then restored in 1932 and 1945). Many Jews were beaten, maimed, and robbed. As a result, Article 6 was withdrawn and Article 7 was added to the 1866 Constitution; it read that "only such aliens as are of the Christian faith may obtain citizenship". The French Jewish lawyer Adolphe Crémieux offered to grant a loan of 25 million of gold francs in exchange for Romania to give citizenship to the Jewish, but the Romanian politicians rejected the proposal.

For the following decades, the issue of Jewish rights occupied the forefront of the Regat's political scene. With few notable exceptions (including some of Junimea affiliates – Petre P. Carp, George Panu, and I.L. Caragiale), most Romanian intellectuals began professing antisemitism; its most virulent form was the one present with advocates of Liberalism (in contradiction to their 1848 political roots), especially Moldavians, who argued that Jewish immigration had prevented the rise of an ethnic Romanian middle class. The first examples of modern prejudice were the Moldavian Fracțiunea liberă și independentă (later blended into the National Liberal Party, PNL) and the Bucharest group formed around Cezar Bolliac. Their discourse saw Jews as non-assimilated and perpetually foreign – this claim was, however, challenged by some contemporary sources, and by the eventual acceptance of all immigrants other than Jews.

Antisemitism was carried into the PNL's mainstream, and was officially enforced under the premierships of Ion Brătianu. During his first years in office, Brătianu reinforced and applied old discrimination laws, insisting that Jews were not allowed to settle in the countryside (and relocating those that had done so), while declaring many Jewish urban inhabitants to be vagrants and expelling them from the country. According to the 1905 Jewish Encyclopedia: "A number of such Jews who proved their Romanian birth were forced across the Danube, and when [the Ottoman Empire] refused to receive them, were thrown into the river and drowned. Almost every country in Europe was shocked at these barbarities. The Romanian government was warned by the powers; and Brătianu was subsequently dismissed from office". Cabinets formed by the Conservative Party, although including Junimea's leaders, did not do much to improve the Jews' condition – mainly due to PNL opposition.

Nonetheless, during this same era, Romania was the cradle of Yiddish theatre. The Russian-born Abraham Goldfaden started the first professional Yiddish theatre company in Iași in 1876 and for several years, especially during the Russo-Turkish War of 1877–1878 Romania was the home of Yiddish theatre. While its center of gravity would move first to Russia, then London, then New York City, both Bucharest and Iași would continue to figure prominently in its history over the next century.

Antisemitism was not, however, unanimous among the Romanian political elite. Various leading politicians from Romanian condemned antisemitism and advocated for different forms of emancipation of the Romanian Jews (gradual or total), such as Prime Ministers Petre P. Carp, Titu Maiorescu or Manolache Costache Epureanu.

== Treaty of Berlin and aftermath ==
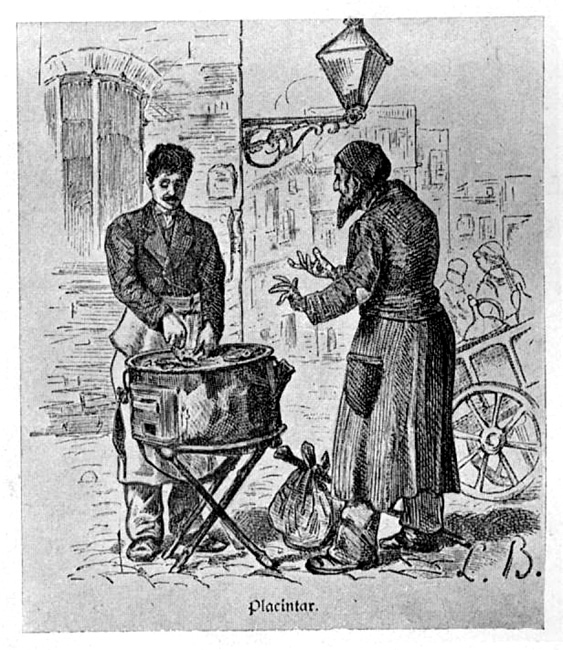
A Greek pie-maker and his Jewish client in Bucharest, c. 1880

When Brătianu resumed leadership, Romania faced the emerging conflict in the Balkans, and saw its chance to declare independence from Ottoman suzerainty by dispatching its troops on the Russian side in the Russo-Turkish War of 1877–1878. The war was concluded by the Treaty of Berlin (1878), which stipulated (Article 44) that the non-Christians in Romania (including both Jews and Muslims in the newly acquired region of Northern Dobruja) should receive full citizenship. After a prolonged debate at home and diplomatic negotiations abroad, the Romanian government ultimately agreed (1879) to abrogate Article 7 of its constitution. This was, however, reformulated to make procedures very difficult: "the naturalization of aliens not under foreign protection should in every individual case be decided by Parliament" (the action involved, among others, a ten-year term before the applicant was given an evaluation). The gesture was doubled by a show of compliance – 883 Jews, participants in the war, were naturalized in a body by a vote of both chambers. German banker Gerson von Bleichröder proposed international recognition of Romania's independence only if it granted citizenship to Jews.

Fifty-seven persons voted upon as individuals were naturalized in 1880; 6, in 1881; 2, in 1882; 2, in 1883; and 18, from 1886 to 1900; in all, 85 Jews in twenty-one years, 27 of whom in the meantime died; c. 4,000 people had obtained citizenship by 1912. Various laws were passed until the pursuit of virtually all careers was made dependent on the possession of political rights, which only Romanians could exercise; more than 40% of Jewish working men, including manual labourers, were forced into unemployment by such legislation. Similar laws were passed in regard to Jews exercising liberal professions.

In 1893, a piece of legislation was voted to deprive Jewish children of the right to be educated in the public schools – they were to be received only if and where children of citizens had been provided for, and their parents were required to pay preferential tuition fees. In 1898, it was passed into law that Jews were to be excluded from secondary schools and the universities. Another notable measure was the expulsion of vocal Jewish activists as "objectionable aliens" (under the provisions of an 1881 law), including those of Moses Gaster and Elias Schwarzfeld.

The courts exacted the oath more judaico in its most offensive form – it was only abolished in 1904, following criticism in the French press. In 1892, when the United States addressed a note to the signatory powers of the Berlin treaty on the matter, it was attacked by the Romanian press. The Lascăr Catargiu government was, however, concerned – the issue was debated among ministers, and, as a result, the Romanian government issued pamphlets in French, reiterating its accusations against the Jews and maintaining that persecutions were deserved and came as retribution for the community's alleged exploitation of the rural population.

== 20th century–present ==
=== Before and after World War I ===
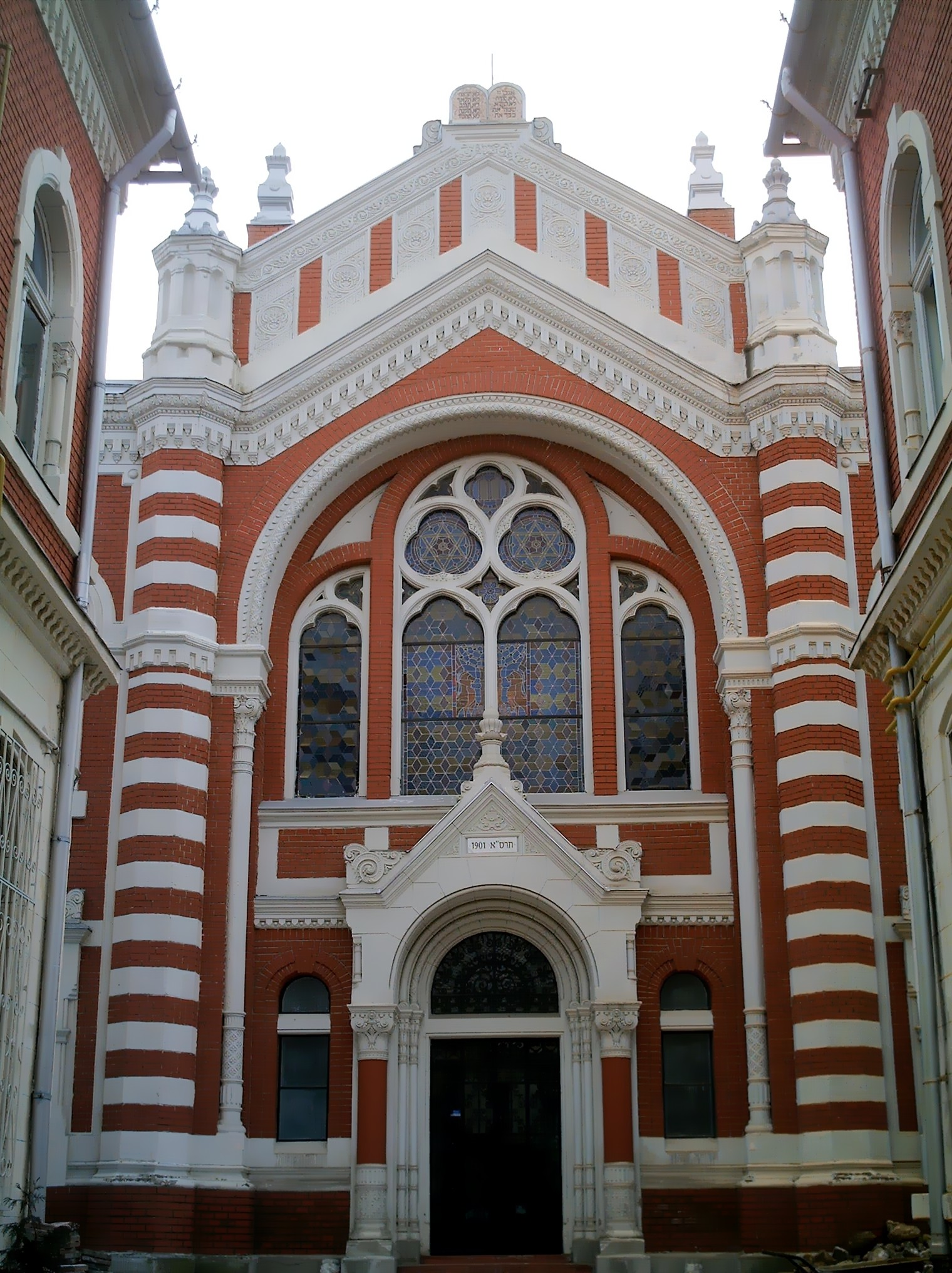
The Synagogue of Brașov (built 1901)

The emigration of Romanian Jews on a larger scale commenced soon after 1878; numbers rose and fell, with a major wave of Bessarabian Jews after the Kishinev pogrom in Imperial Russia (1905). The Jewish Encyclopedia wrote in 1905, shortly before the pogrom, "It is admitted that at least 70 per cent would leave the country at any time if the necessary traveling expenses were furnished". There are no official statistics of emigration; but it is safe to place the minimum number of Jewish emigrants from 1898 to 1904 at 70,000. By 1900 there were 250,000 Romanian Jews: 3.3% of the population, 14.6% of the city dwellers, 32% of the Moldavian urban population and 42% of Iași.

Jacob Itzhak Niemirower and Yehuda Leib Tsirelson at the 1922 Coronation of King Ferdinand and Queen Maria of Romania

Land issues and Jewish presence among estate leaseholders accounted for the 1907 Romanian Peasants' Revolt, partly antisemitic in message. During the same period, the anti-Jewish message first expanded beyond its National Liberal base (where it was soon an insignificant attitude), to cover the succession of more radical and Moldavian-based organizations founded by A.C. Cuza (his Democratic Nationalist Party, created in 1910, had the first antisemitic program in Romanian political history). No longer present in the PNL's ideology by the 1920s, antisemitism also tended to surface in on the left-wing of the political spectrum, in currents originating in Poporanism – which favoured the claim that peasants were being systematically exploited by Jews.

World War I, during which 882 Jewish soldiers died defending Romania (825 were decorated), brought about the creation of Greater Romania after the 1919 Paris Peace Conference and subsequent treaties. The enlarged state had an increased Jewish population, corresponding with the addition of communities in Bessarabia, Bukovina, and Transylvania. On signing the treaties, Romania agreed to change its policy towards the Jews, promising to award them both citizenship and minority rights, the effective emancipation of Jews. The 1923 Constitution of Romania sanctioned these requirements, meeting opposition from Cuza's National-Christian Defense League and rioting by far right students in Iași; the land reform carried out by the Ion I. C. Brătianu cabinet also settled problems connected with land tenancy.

During the interwar period, thousands of Jewish refugees from the USSR migrated to Romania.

Political representation for the Jewish community in the inter-war period was divided between the Jewish Party and the Federation of Jewish Communities of Romania (the latter was re-established after 1989). During the same period, a division in ritual became apparent between Reform Jews in Transylvania and usually Orthodox ones in the rest of the country (while Bessarabia was the most open to Zionism and especially the socialist Labor Zionism).

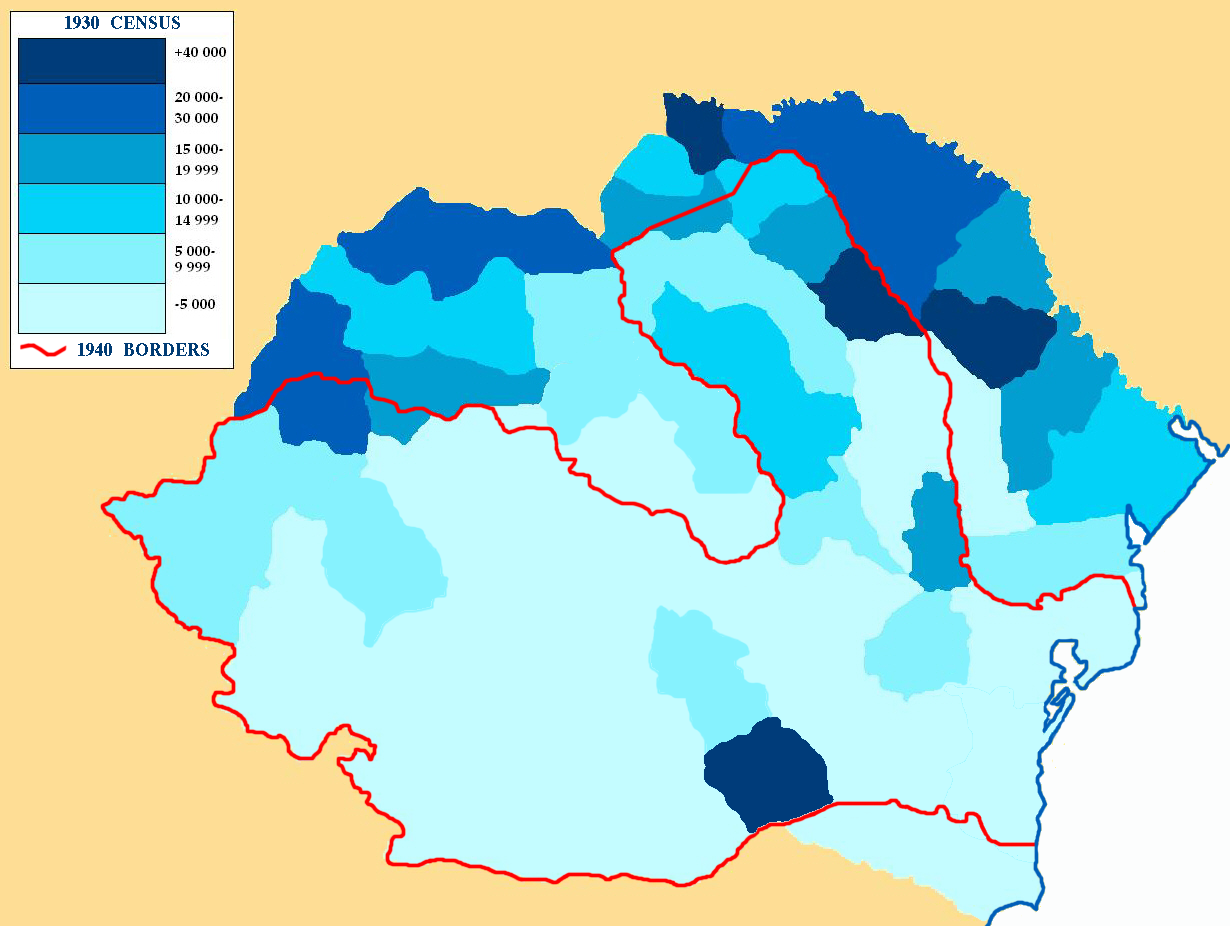
Jewish population per county in Greater Romania, according to the Wiesel Commission report, pp. 81, which counted 728,115 Jews by ethnicity and 756,930 Jews by religion

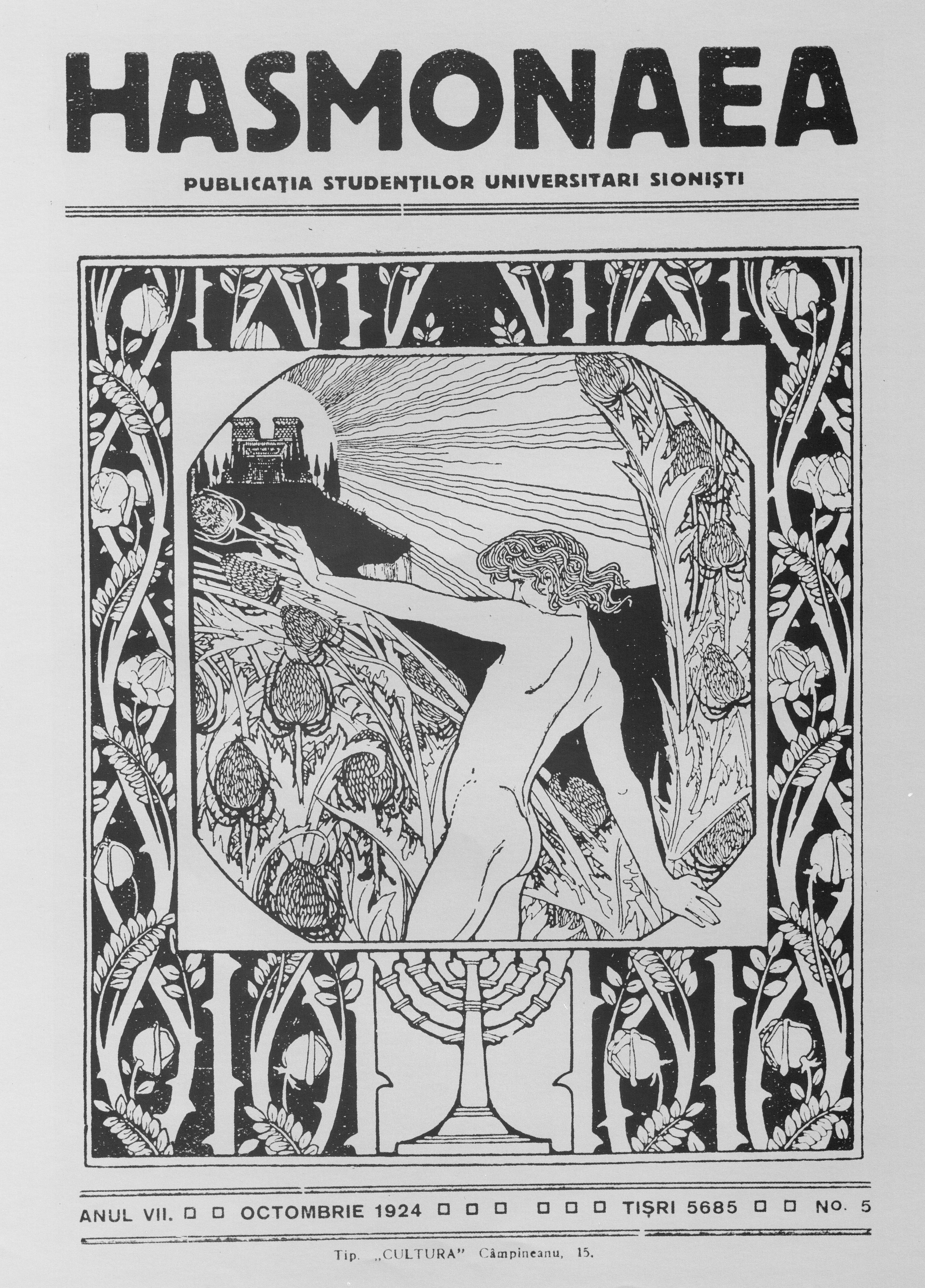
Cover of Hasmonaea, magazine of Zionist university students of Romania, by A. L. Zissu, in 1924

The popularity of anti-Jewish messages was, nevertheless, on the rise, and merged itself with the appeal of fascism in the late 1920s – both contributed to the creation and success of Corneliu Zelea Codreanu's Iron Guard and the appearance of new types of antisemitic discourses (Trăirism and Gândirism). The idea of a Jewish quota in higher education became highly popular among Romanian students and teachers. According to Andrei Oișteanu's analysis, a relevant number of right-wing intellectuals refused to adopt overt antisemitism, which was ill-reputed through its association with A. C. Cuza's violent discourse; nevertheless, a few years later, such cautions were cast aside, and antisemitism became displayed as "spiritual health".

The first motion to exclude Jews from professional associations came on May 16, 1937, when the Confederation of the Associations of Professional Intellectuals (Confederația Asociațiilor de Profesioniști Intelectuali din România) voted to exclude all Jewish members from its affiliated bodies, calling for the state to withdraw their licenses and reassess their citizenship. Although illegal, the measure was popular and it was commented that, in its case, legality had been supplanted by a "heroic decision". According to Oișteanu, the initiative had a direct influence on antisemitic regulations passed during the following year.

1928: Prime Minister Vintilă Brătianu meeting with the Jewish leaders Jacob Itzhak Niemirower (left) and Yehuda Leib Tsirelson (right)

The threat posed by the Iron Guard, the emergence of Nazi Germany as a European power, and his own fascist sympathies, made King Carol II, who was still largely identified as a philo-Semite, adopt racial discrimination as the norm. In the recent election, over 25% of the electorate had voted for explicitly antisemitic groups (either the Goga-Cuza alliance (9%) or the Iron Guard's political mouthpiece, TPT(16.5%)), and as a result, Carol was forced to let one of the two into his cabinet- he instantly chose the Goga-Cuza alliance over the rabid fascism of the Iron Guard (according to modern historian of the Balkans, Misha Glenny, he also thought that this would "take the sting out of the Guard's tail"). On January 21, 1938, Carol's executive (led by Cuza and Octavian Goga) passed a law aimed at reviewing criteria for citizenship (after it cast allegations that previous cabinets had allowed Ukrainian Jews to obtain it illegally), and requiring all Jews who had received citizenship in 1918–1919 to reapply for it (while providing a very short term in which this could be achieved – 20 days);

However, Carol II himself was highly hostile to antisemitism. His lover, Elena Lupescu, was Jewish, as were a number of his friends in government, and he soon reverted to his original policies (that is, fiercely opposing the antisemites and fascists), but with a newly violent sting. On February 12, 1938, he used the rising violence between political groups as context to seize absolute power (a move which was tacitly supported by the liberals who had come to view him as a lesser evil in comparison to Codreanu's fascist movement). As an authentic Romanian nationalist (albeit, one who had a view of a Westernized, forcefully industrialized Romania at the expense of the peasants whom he viewed with disdain; making him completely the antithesis of the views of Codreanu), Carol was determined that Romania should not fall into the near-absolute economic and political control that many of its neighbors already had, and moved to theatrical resistance against Nazi ideology.

The King then arrested the entire leadership of the Iron Guard, on the grounds that they were in the pay of the Nazis, and began using the same accusation against various political opponents, both to solidify his absolute control of the country as well as negatively stigmatize Germany. In November, the fourteen most important fascist leaders (the first of which being Codreanu) were "rinsed" in acid.

However, Carol's policy was doomed by the reluctance of France and Britain to fight wars with the totalitarian powers of Germany, Italy and the Soviet Union. The Soviet Union attacked Romania and declared the annexation of Bukovina and Bessarabia (which was to be renamed Moldova), and when Carol turned to the only possible hope – that is, assistance from the former "eternal foe", Nazi Germany – he was angrily rejected by Hitler personally, who did not have to try hard to remember how Carol had previously humiliated the cause of his ideology. Carol was forced to acknowledge the annexation, leading directly to his overthrow in a coup led by Ion Antonescu.

In 1940, the Ion Gigurtu cabinet adopted Romania's equivalent to the Nuremberg Laws, forbidding Jewish-Christian intermarriage, and defining Jews after racial criteria (a person was Jewish if he or she had a Jewish grandparent on one side of the family).

=== Politics ===
- Union of Romanian Jews
- Jewish Party of Romania
- Jewish National People's Party
- General Jewish Labour Bund in Romania

=== The Holocaust ===
Romania allied itself with Nazi Germany from 1940 to 1944. Under the dictatorship of Ion Antonescu, 380,000–400,000 Jews were murdered in the Holocaust in Romanian-controlled areas such as Bessarabia, Bukovina and Transnistria.

==== The Iron Guard ====
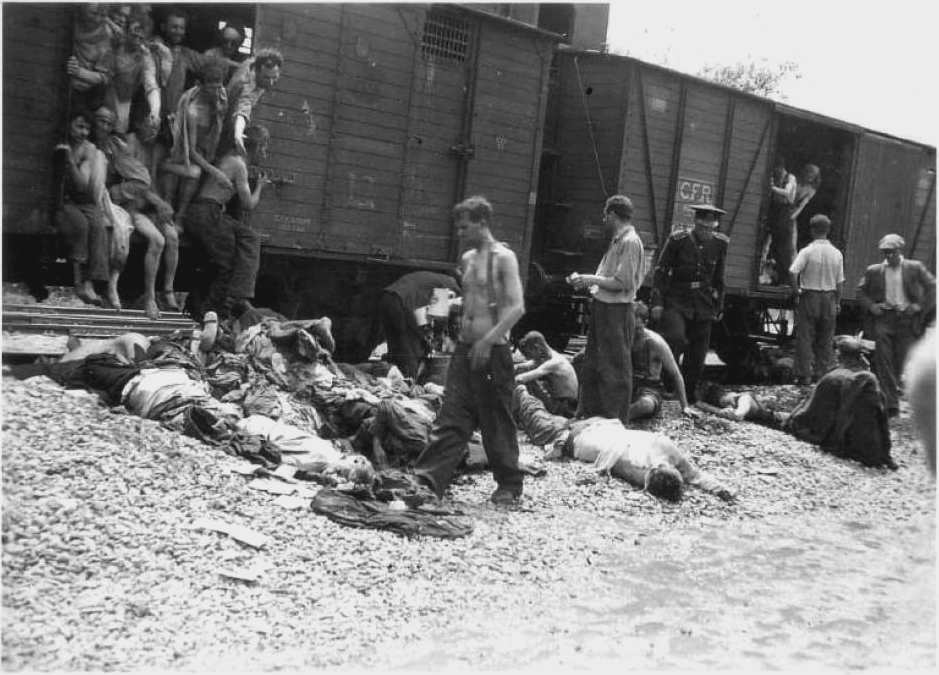
Victims of the Iași pogrom

Between the establishment of the National Legionary State and 1942, 80 anti-Jewish regulations were passed. Starting at the end of October, 1940, the Iron Guard began a massive antisemitic campaign, culminating in the failed coup and a pogrom in Bucharest, during which Jews were tortured and beaten, their shops looted, and 120 Jews were killed. Antonescu eventually stopped the violence and chaos created by the Iron Guard by brutally suppressing the rebellion.

==== Antonescu's régime ====
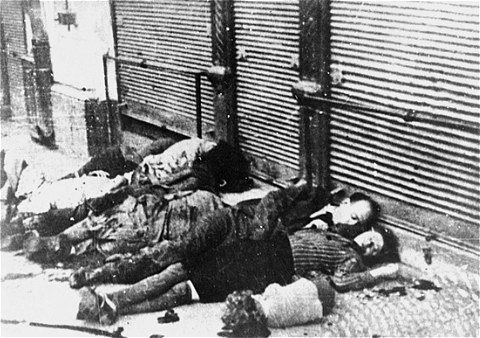
Murdered Jews, adults and children, on a Iași street

After Romania entered the war at the start of Operation Barbarossa atrocities against the Jews became common, starting with the Iași pogrom – on June 27, 1941, Romanian dictator Ion Antonescu telephoned Col. Constantin Lupu, commander of the Iași garrison, telling him formally to "cleanse Iași of its Jewish population", though plans for the pogrom had been laid even earlier – 13,266 Jews, according to Romanian authorities, were killed in July 1941.

In July–August 1941, the yellow badge was imposed by local initiatives in several cities (Iași, Bacău, Cernăuți). A similar measure imposed by the national government lasted only five days (between September 3 and September 8, 1941), before being annulled on Antonescu's order. However, on local initiative, the badge was still worn especially in the towns of Moldavia, Bessarabia and Bukovina (Bacău, Iași, Câmpulung, Botoșani, Cernăuți, etc.).

In 1941, following the advancing Romanian Army during Operation Barbarossa, and, according to Antonescu propaganda, alleged attacks by Jews, who were considered en masse "Communist agents" by the official propaganda, Antonescu ordered the deportation to Transnistria, of all Jews of Bessarabia and Bukovina. "Deportation" however was a euphemism, as part of the process involved mass killing of Jews before deporting the rest in the "trains of death" (in reality long exhausting marches on foot) to the East. It is estimated that from July–September 1941, the Romanian Army and Gendarmerie, in cooperation with the Wehrmacht and the Einsatzgruppen, murdered between 45,000 and 60,000 Jewish civilians in Bukovina and Bessarabia alone. Of those who escaped the initial ethnic cleansing in Bukovina and Bessarabia, few managed to survive "trains" and the concentration camps set up in the Transnistria Governorate. In 1941–1942, the total number of deportees from Bessarabia, Bukovina, Dorohoi and the Regat totaled between 154,449 and 170,737 people.

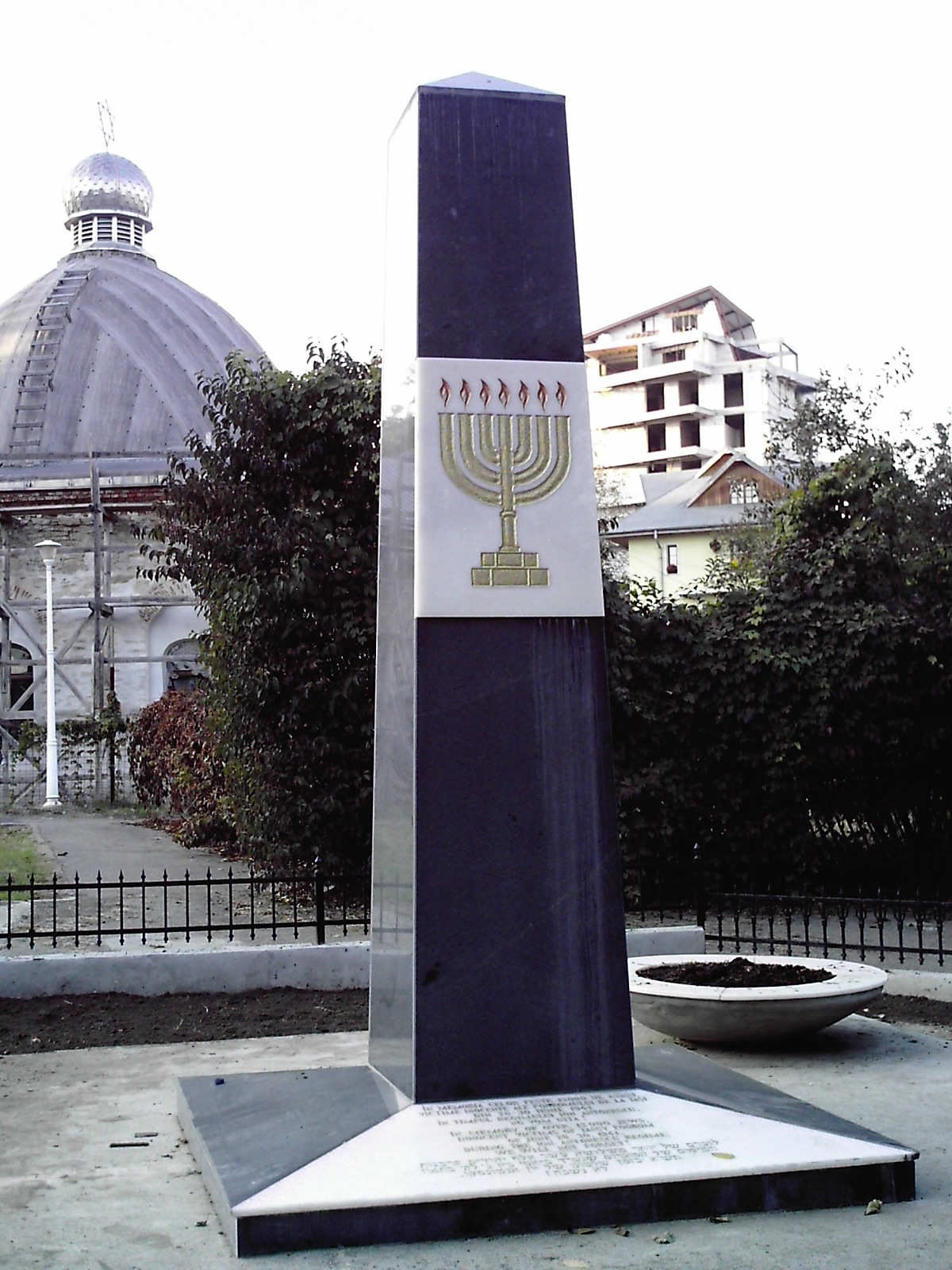
Victims of Iași Pogrom Monument

Further killings perpetrated by Antonescu's death squads (documents prove his direct orders) in collaboration with the German Einsatzkommando, the SS squads of local Ukrainian Germans (Sonderkommando Russland and Selbstschutz), and the Ukrainian militia targeted the local Jewish population that the Romanian Army managed to round up when occupying Transnistria. Over one hundred thousand of these were killed in massacres staged in such places as Odessa (see Odessa massacre), Bogdanovka, Akmechetka, Pechora in 1941 and 1942.

Antonescu's government also made plans for mass deportations of Romanian Jews from the rest of the country (the Regat and southern Transylvania), numbering 292,149 people (according to a May 1942 census), to Transnistria region, or, in collaboration with the German government, to the Belzec extermination camp, but these had never been carried out.

The change in policy toward the Jews began in October 1942, and by March–April 1943, Antonescu permanently stopped all deportations despite German pressure, as he began to seek peace with the Allies, although at the same time he levied heavy taxes and forced labor on the remaining Jewish communities. Also, sometimes with the encouragement of Antonescu's regime, thirteen boats left Romania for the British Mandate of Palestine during the war, carrying 13,000 Jews (two of these ships were sunk by the Soviets (see Struma disaster), and the effort was discontinued after German pressure was applied).

Discussions regarding the repatriation of deported Jews followed, and in January 1943, the leader of the Romanian-Jewish community Wilhelm Filderman began talks with the Romanian government in order to start repatriating Romanian Jews deported to Transnistria. On November 15, 1943, an official report of the Romanian government indicated that 49,927 Romanian Jews were alive in Transnistria (of which 6,425 were originally from the Regat). In December 1943, partial repatriation began, and in March 1944, Antonescu government ordered general repatriation for all Romanian Jews deportees from Transnistria. Between December 20, 1943, and March 30, 1944, almost 11,000 people (including orphans) were repatriated from different camps and ghettos in Transnistria. However, the decision came too late to organize the repatriation of the last large number of deportees, and the fate of tens of thousands of deportees remaining in Transnistria became unknown.

Site	Romanian-era classification / function	Present-day location	Notes	English Wikipedia article
Akhmechetka / Acmecetca	Camp / extermination site	Prybuzhzhya, Mykolaiv Oblast, Ukraine	One of the principal killing camps in Golta County, where thousands of Jews were murdered.	Akhmechetka concentration camp
Ananiev	Ghetto	Ananiv, Odesa Oblast, Ukraine	A ghetto was established after Ananiev became part of Romanian-administered Transnistria in September 1941. About 300 remaining Jews were confined there and were subsequently murdered near Mostovoye while being marched toward Dubăsari.	—
Balanivka / Balanovca	Ghetto / transit site	Balanivka, Vinnytsia Oblast, Ukraine	Established in October 1941 as a ghetto and transit site for Jewish deportees from Bessarabia and Bukovina. About 3,500 Jews were initially confined in roofless cowsheds, and thousands died from cold, malnutrition, disease and poor sanitary conditions.	—
Balta	Ghetto	Balta, Odesa Oblast, Ukraine	A ghetto was established in October 1941 and held local Jews, Jews from elsewhere in Ukraine, and deportees from Bessarabia and Bukovina. About 4,000 Jews were initially confined there.	—
Bershad	Ghetto	Bershad, Vinnytsia Oblast, Ukraine	One of the major ghettos of Romanian-administered Transnistria; it held local Jews and large numbers of deportees from Bessarabia and Bukovina, many of whom suffered from overcrowding, hunger and disease.	—
Bobryk / Bobric	Camp / ghetto	Bobryk, Odesa Oblast, Ukraine	One of the sites used by Romanian authorities to concentrate Jewish deportees in Transnistria before intended expulsion across the Bug River into German-controlled territory.	—
Bogdanovka	Colony / concentration camp	Bohdanivka, Mykolaiv Oblast, Ukraine	Major site of mass murder in Golta County. Tens of thousands of Jews were murdered there between December 1941 and January 1942.	Bogdanovka concentration camp
Bratslav	Ghetto	Bratslav, Vinnytsia Oblast, Ukraine	Ghetto established in September 1941 for local Jews, Jews from the surrounding district and deportees from Bessarabia and Bukovina. Most inmates were transferred to the Pechora concentration camp around the beginning of January 1942.	—
Camenca	Ghetto	Camenca, present-day Moldova	Ghetto in Romanian-administered Transnistria that held local Jews and deportees; as elsewhere in Transnistria, Jews confined in ghettos were subjected to forced labour and severe shortages of food and other necessities.	—
Cicelnic / Chechelnik	Ghetto	Chechelnyk, Vinnytsia Oblast, Ukraine	A barbed-wire-enclosed ghetto held about 1,000 local Jews and survivors from neighbouring communities, followed by more than 1,000 deportees from Bukovina and Bessarabia. Inmates were subjected to forced labour, and about one-third died during a typhus epidemic in the winter of 1941–1942.	—
Domanovka / Domanevca	Camp	Domanivka, Mykolaiv Oblast, Ukraine	Major detention and killing site in Golta County, where Romanian authorities carried out mass murder of Jews.	Domanovka concentration camp
Dubăsari	Ghetto / mass killing site	Dubăsari, present-day Moldova	Romanian authorities established a ghetto consisting of two streets and confined about 2,500 Jews from Dubăsari district there. In September 1941, members of Einsatzkommando 12 began murdering the ghetto's inmates in mass shootings outside the town.	—
Dzhurin	Ghetto	Dzhuryn, Vinnytsia Oblast, Ukraine	Ghetto under Romanian occupation that held local Jews and deportees from Romania, including Jews from Bessarabia and Bukovina.	—
Dzyhivka	Ghetto	Dzygivka, Vinnytsia Oblast, Ukraine	Jews were concentrated in a ghetto shortly after the German occupation in July 1941. After the town became part of Romanian-administered Transnistria, about 100 deportees from Bukovina and Bessarabia were brought there, and inmates were subjected to forced labour.	—
Grosulovo	Internment camp	Velyka Mykhailivka, Odesa Oblast, Ukraine	A camp established in a dilapidated tobacco depot in autumn 1941 initially held local Ukrainian Jews and Jews deported from Bessarabia and Bukovina. In October 1943 hundreds of Jewish and non-Jewish political prisoners were transferred there from Vapniarka.	Grosulovo internment camp
Iampol	Ghetto / deportation transit point	Yampil, Vinnytsia Oblast, Ukraine	One of the crossing points through which Jews deported from Bessarabia and Bukovina entered Transnistria; deportees were subsequently distributed among camps and ghettos in the governorate.	—
Mohyliv-Podilskyi / Mogilev	Ghetto / transit centre	Mohyliv-Podilskyi, Vinnytsia Oblast, Ukraine	One of the principal entry points for Jews deported from Bessarabia and Bukovina and the site of one of the largest ghettos in Transnistria. About 25,000 Bessarabian Jews passed through a transit camp there in 1941.	—
Murafa	Ghetto	Murafa, Vinnytsia Oblast, Ukraine	Ghetto in Romanian-administered Transnistria that became a destination for Jewish deportees, including Jews from Bukovina.	—
Mytky	Camp / ghetto	Vinnytsia Oblast, Ukraine	One of the northern Transnistrian sites designated by Romanian authorities for concentrating Jews before their intended expulsion across the Bug River.	—
Obodivka / Obodovka / Obodovca	Ghetto / transit camp	Obodivka, Vinnytsia Oblast, Ukraine	One of the principal concentration and transit sites used for Jews deported into Transnistria; deportees were confined under extremely poor conditions.	Obodivka internment camp
Olgopol	Ghetto	Olhopil, Vinnytsia Oblast, Ukraine	A ghetto was established for the remaining local Jews and several hundred deportees from Bessarabia and Bukovina. Inmates were subjected to forced labour, hunger and a typhus epidemic.	—
Pechora / Pecioara	Concentration camp	Pechera, Vinnytsia Oblast, Ukraine	One of two sites described by the United States Holocaust Memorial Museum as concentration camps established by Romanian authorities in Transnistria; prisoners died in large numbers from starvation, exposure and disease.	Pechora concentration camp
Golta	Ghetto / forced-labour and internment sites	Pervomaisk, Mykolaiv Oblast, Ukraine	Administrative centre of Golta County, a district containing several major Romanian detention and killing sites, including Bogdanovka, Domanovka and Akhmechetka.	—
Rohizka / Rogozna	Camp / ghetto	Vinnytsia Oblast, Ukraine	One of the northern Transnistrian sites designated by Romanian authorities for concentrating Jews before their intended expulsion across the Bug River.	—
Șargorod	Ghetto	Sharhorod, Vinnytsia Oblast, Ukraine	A major ghetto that held local Jews and thousands of deportees. About 5,000 Jews from Bessarabia and Bukovina were deported to Sharhorod in late 1941, joining approximately 2,000 local Jews.	—
Slobidka	Ghetto / transit camp	Odesa, Odesa Oblast, Ukraine	Romanian authorities confined thousands of Jews in the Slobidka ghetto. In January 1942 it became the principal assembly and transit point for the deportation of Odesa's remaining Jews to other parts of Transnistria.	—
Slivina	Forced-labour camp	Slyvyne, Mykolaiv Oblast, Ukraine	Forced-labour camp established in spring 1943 during German bridge and road construction operations near the Southern Bug. Jews from ghettos elsewhere in Transnistria were transferred there for forced labour.	—
Șpikov	Ghetto	Shpykiv, Vinnytsia Oblast, Ukraine	Ghetto in Romanian-administered Transnistria that held local Jews and deportees; Jews from Shpykiv were among those transferred to the Pechora concentration camp.	—
Tiraspol	Ghetto / transit and forced-labour centre	Tiraspol, present-day Moldova	An important transit point for Jews deported into Transnistria. A small ghetto developed around Jewish craftsmen retained in the city, and several forced-labour centres subsequently operated there.	—
Tomashpil	Ghetto	Tomashpil, Vinnytsia Oblast, Ukraine	Romanian authorities confined the town's Jews in a barbed-wire-enclosed ghetto in December 1941. Inmates lived in severe overcrowding and were used for forced labour, while hunger and infectious disease were widespread.	—
Tulcin	Ghetto	Tulchyn, Vinnytsia Oblast, Ukraine	A ghetto was established in October 1941. On 13 December about 3,000 Jews were deported from Tulcin to the Pechora concentration camp, while a smaller number of skilled workers were initially retained in the town.	—
Vapniarka	Concentration camp	Vapniarka, Vinnytsia Oblast, Ukraine	Concentration camp used primarily for Jewish political prisoners deported from Romania. Hundreds developed lathyrism after prisoners were fed toxic Lathyrus sativus peas.	Vapniarka concentration camp

==== Results ====
Historical and political situations have determined the destinies of the Romanian Jews in different ways, depending on the regions in which they were living, and proximity to the front being the most important variable. The total number of deaths is not certain, but even the lowest respectable estimates run to about 250,000 Jews (plus 25,000 deported Romani, of which approximately 11,000 were murdered).

According to the Wiesel Commission report released by the Romanian government in 2004, between 280,000 and 380,000 Jews were murdered or died in various forms on Romanian soil, in the regions of Bessarabia, Bukovina, and in the occupied Soviet territories under Romanian's control (Transnistria Governorate).

At least 15,000 Jews from the Regat were murdered in the Iași pogrom and as a result of other anti-Jewish measures. Half of the estimated 270,000 to 320,000 Jews living in Bessarabia, Bukovina, and the former Dorohoi County in Romania were murdered or died between June 1941 and November 1943. Between 45,000 and 60,000 Jews were killed in Bessarabia and Bukovina by Romanian and German troops in 1941. Between 104,522 and 120,810 deported Romanian Jews died as a result of the expulsions to Transnistria. After a wave of random initial killings, Jews in Moldavia were subject to pogroms, while those in Bessarabia, Bukovina and Dorohoi were concentrated into ghettos from which they were deported to concentration camps in the Transnistria Governorate, including camps built and run by Romanians. Romanian soldiers and gendarmes also worked with the German Einsatzkommando, the Ukrainian militia, and the SS squads of local Ukrainian Germans to massacre Jews in conquered territories east of the Romania's 1940 border. In Transnistria, between 115,000 and 180,000 indigenous Ukrainian Jews were murdered, especially in Odessa and the counties of Golta and Berezovka.

At the same time, 135,000 Jews living under Hungarian control in Northern Transylvania were deported to and died in concentration and extermination camps. In addition, 5,000 Romanian Jews were murdered in the Holocaust in other countries.

A majority of the Romanian Jews living within the 1940 borders did survive the war, although they were subject to a wide range of harsh conditions, including forced labor, financial penalties, and discriminatory law. Also, thousands of Romanian Jews living abroad were able to survive thanks to renewed Romanian diplomatic protection. However, the total number of victims makes Romania count as first, according to the Wiesel Commission, "Of all the allies of Nazi Germany, [responsible] for the deaths of more Jews than any country other than Germany itself".

During the postwar period, the history of the Holocaust was distorted or simply ignored by East European communist regimes. The trials of war criminals began in 1945 and continued until the early 1950s, but they received public attention only for a short period of time. In postcommunist Romania, Holocaust denial has been a diffuse phenomenon, and until 2004, when researchers made numerous documents publicly available, many in Romania denied knowledge that their country participated in the Holocaust. The Romanian government has recognized that a Holocaust took place on its territory and held its first Holocaust Day in 2004. In memory of the victims of the Holocaust and particularly to reflecting on Romania's role in the Holocaust, the Romanian government decided to make October 9 the National Day of Commemorating the Holocaust.

=== Holocaust denial in Romania ===
Decades after the Holocaust, especially during the Communist era in Romania, educating and learning about the Holocaust was considered taboo. Textbooks did mention the Holocaust in passing, but it failed to acknowledge the role of the Romanian government in the systematic murder of the Jewish and Romani people. Holocaust denial is still prevalent in Romanian society.

During the Communist era from 1945 to 1989, the government influenced every part of society, including history education. When World War Two was mentioned, textbooks said that Romania was fighting against Hitler, and when the textbooks mentioned that Romania collaborated with the Nazis, it says that Romania actually lost their national independence and was occupied by Germany not that they willingly helped the Nazis and supported them. When the textbooks mentioned the killings of the Jewish people, which was not common during the time since any mention of the Holocaust was ignored and omitted, they were glossed, diminished, or distorted. When the Holocaust was mentioned, it was painted as just another broader casualty of the War in short passing and hid any responsibility of the nation while mentioning Romania's exceptional standing in Europe. Instead, the textbooks painted the Communists as the main victim of the Nazis.

Holocaust education took a long time to be implemented in post-Communist Romania. Democratization in Romania started in December 1989, but it took 10 years, until 1999, for Holocaust education to be raised as an issue and for a law to pass. Although Holocaust education was accepted in 1999, it took months for the government to solidify their curriculum to show the atrocities of the Holocaust and their role in it.

As of 2021, Romania has made strides to rid itself from the past of Holocaust denial. It has joined the International Holocaust Remembrance alliance in 2004, and took over chairmanship in 2016, as well as constantly organizing and sponsoring events surrounding Holocaust education. In 2021, the first sentence over Holocaust denial was made in the country. The accused was Vasile Zărnescu, a former Romanian Intelligence Service (SRI) member who published several articles and a book against the veracity of the Holocaust.

=== Post-War ===
According to the Wiesel Commission, "... at least 290,000 Romanian Jews survived". Howard M. Sachar estimated that 360,000 Romanian Jews were still alive at the end of World War II. According to statistics from the end of the war, 355,972 Romanian Jews lived on the territory of Romania.

Mass emigration to Israel ensued (see Bricha and Aliyah). According to Sachar, for the first two post-war years, tens of thousands of Romanian Jews left for Mandatory Palestine; the Romanian government did not try to stop them, especially due to its desire to reduce its historically suspect and now impoverished Jewish minority. Afterwards, Jewish emigration began to encounter obstacles. In 1948, the year of Israeli independence, Zionism came under renewed suspicion, and the government began a campaign of liquidation against Zionist funds and training farms. However, emigration was not completely banned; Romanian Foreign Minister Ana Pauker, herself a Jew with a father and brother in Israel, negotiated an agreement with Israeli ambassador Reuven Rubin, who himself was a Romanian Jewish immigrant to Israel, under which the Romanian government would allow 4,000 Jews a month to emigrate to Israel; this decision was at least partially influenced by a large Jewish Agency bribe to the Romanian government. This agreement applied mainly to ruined businessmen and other economically "redundant" Jews. Around this time, Israel also secured another agreement with the Romanian government, under which Romania issued 100,000 exit visas for Jews and Israel supplied Romania with oil drills and pipes to aid the struggling Romanian oil industry. By December 1951, about 115,000 Romanian Jews had emigrated to Israel.

During the period of transition towards a communist regime in Romania, following Soviet occupation (see Soviet occupation of Romania), Jewish society and culture were subject to the same increasingly tight control by the authorities. The community leader Wilhelm Filderman had been arrested already in 1945 and had to flee the country in 1948. Antonescu, after a brief detention in the Soviet Union, was shot in June 1946 for war crimes. On April 22, 1946, Gheorghe Gheorghiu-Dej attended a meeting of Jewish organizations and called for the creation of a new body, the Jewish Democratic Committee, which was in reality a section of the Romanian Communist Party PCR.

After the proclamation of the People's Republic of Romania on December 30, 1947, the government formed by the PCR outlawed all Jewish organizations at a meeting on June 10–June 11, 1948, stating that "the party must take a stand on every question concerning the Jews of Romania and fight vigorously against reactionary nationalist Jewish currents (that is, Zionism)". Between 1952 and 1953 the Stalinist antisemitic charges of "rootless cosmopolitanism" brought about the purging of the party's own leadership (including Jewish ex-premier and foreign minister Ana Pauker); the charges were then inflicted upon the larger part of the Jewish community, beginning with a trial engineered by Iosif Chișinevschi. Jews who were perceived as Zionists were given harsh labour sentences in communist prisons such as Pitești (where they were subject to torture and brainwashing experiments; a few of them died in detention). The 1952 trial of the engineers made responsible for the failure of the Danube-Black Sea Canal project also involved allegations of Zionism (notably aimed at Aurel Rozei-Rozenberg, who was eventually executed).

During the Cold War, Romania was the only communist country not to break its diplomatic relations with Israel. Throughout the period of Communist rule, Romania allowed limited numbers of Jews to emigrate to Israel, in exchange for much-needed Israeli economic aid. By 1965, Israel was funding agricultural and industrial projects throughout Romania, and in exchange, Romania allowed a trickle of Jewish emigration to Israel.

When Nicolae Ceaușescu came to power in 1965, he initially ended the trade in deference to the Eastern bloc's Arab allies. However, Romania was the only Warsaw Pact nation not to break diplomatic relations with Israel after the Six-Day War of 1967, and by 1969, Ceaușescu decided to exchange Jews for cash from Israel. He wanted economic independence from the Soviet Union, which was content to keep Romania a backwater and as nothing more than a supplier of raw materials, but to fund economic projects, he needed hard cash. As a result, from then until the Ceaușescu regime fell in 1989, about 1,500 Jews a year were granted exit visas to Israel in exchange for a payment of cash for every Jew allowed to leave, in addition to other Israeli aid. The exact payments were determined by the age, education, profession, employment, and family status of the emigrant. Israel paid a minimum of $2,000 per head for every emigrant, and paid prices in the range of $25,000 for doctors or scientists. In addition to these payments, Israel also secured loans for Romania and paid off the interest itself, and supplied the Romanian Army with military equipment.

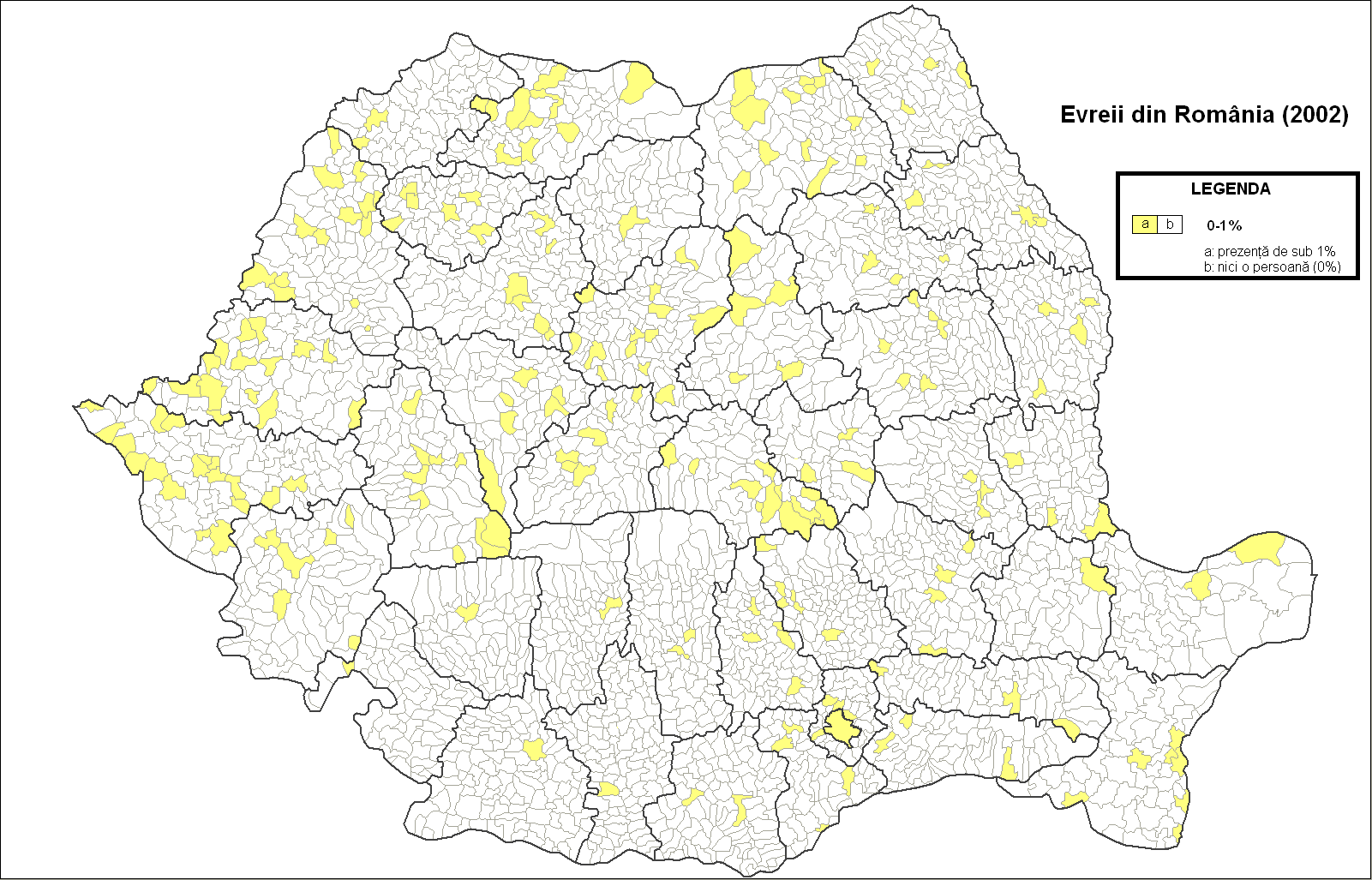
Jews in Romania (2002 census)

As a result of aliyah, the Romanian-Jewish community was gradually depleted. By 1987, just 23,000 Jews were left in Romania, half of whom were over 65 years old. Romanian Jews became in the 1980s Israel's second largest ethnic community, outnumbered only by the Moroccans.

Nevertheless, Romania still has a small Jewish community with some active synagogues, and the oldest uninterrupted Yiddish-language theater in the world. With the fall of communism in Romania, Jewish cultural, social, and religious life has been undergoing a revival. Acts of antisemitism, such destruction of cemetery gravestones, continue to take place, but they are very rare. In 2016, the Romanian Jewish population was estimated as ranging between 9,300 and 17,000. There are also 3,000 Israeli-born people living in Romania. In Romania there is also a small number of Jewish immigrants from the other parts of the world. Every year, tens of Romanian Jewish families from Israel return to their native country.

Hasidic Judaism and Haredi Judaism are also present in the country. Chabad has the Yeshua Tova Synagogue, a kosher restaurant, a Jewish kindergarten, a Jewish school and a youth organization, all of them located in Bucharest. The group also has 2 community centers: one in Voluntari and one in Cluj. Satmar also has plans to build a community in Romania. In 2021, a synagogue was inaugurated in Sighetu Marmației; a hotel, a kosher restaurant and a Jewish school are under construction in Sighetu Marmației, all of them under Aaron Teitelbaum's organization.

As of 2021, there is also a project to build a rabbinical seminary in Oradea.

The Federation of the Jewish Communities in Romania Party has one seat in the Chamber of Deputies, the lower house of the Romanian Parliament.

After the 2022 Russian invasion of Ukraine, 140 Jewish orphans have fled from Ukraine to Romania and Republic of Moldova.

On January 29, 2024, two women who converted to Islam vandalized the fence of the Satmar synagogue in Sighetu Marmației, writing "free Palestine" in English and Romanian.

== Historical population ==
The historical Jewish population in Romania can be seen below.

The 1930 census was the only one to cover Greater Romania. Censuses in 1948, 1956, 1966, 1977, 1992, 2002 and 2011 covered Romania's present-day territory. All but the 1948 census, which asked about mother tongue, had a question on ethnicity. Moldavia and Wallachia each held a census in 1859. The Romanian Old Kingdom (Regat) conducted statistical estimates in 1884, 1889 and 1894, and held censuses in 1899 and 1912. Ion Antonescu's regime also held two: a general one in April 1941, and one for those with "Jewish blood" in May 1942.

Year	Population	Territory (Historical regions)
1866	134,168	Romanian United Principalities (Moldavia, Wallachia, Southern Bessarabia)
1887	300,000	Romanian Old Kingdom (Regat) (Moldavia, Wallachia, Northern Dobruja)
1899	256,588	Romanian Old Kingdom
1930	728,115	Kingdom of Romania (Greater Romania) (Moldavia, Wallachia, Dobruja, Transylvania, Bukovina, Bessarabia)
1941	356,237	Kingdom of Romania (Moldavia, Wallachia, Northern Dobruja, Southern Transylvania, Southern Bukovina)
1956	146,264	Socialist Republic of Romania (Moldavia, Wallachia, Northern Dobruja, Transylvania, Southern Bukovina)
1966	42,888	Socialist Republic of Romania
1977	24,667	Socialist Republic of Romania
1992	8,955	Romania
2002	5,785	Romania
2011	3,271	Romania
2021	2,378	Romania

Notes: Census in 1930 with the regions acquired in 1918–1920; census in 1941 without the territories lost in 1940; censuses in 1956, 1966, 1977, 1992, 2002 and 2011 covered Romania's present-day territory
Source: Demographic history of Romania

YIVO provides somewhat different population figures for Romania's Jewish population, specifically 400,000 in 1945, 280,000 in 1951, 200,000 in 1960, 70,000 in 1970, 33,000 in 1980, 17,000 in 1990, and 11,000 in 2000.

== Hasidic dynasties originating in today's Romania ==
=== Major groups ===
- Satmar, originating from Satu Mare, one of the world's largest groups
- Klausenburg, originating from Cluj-Napoca, the world's 9th largest group
- Spinks, originating from Săpânța – 10th
- Temishvar originating from Timișoara 3rd largest in the world

=== Other groups ===
- Bohush, from Buhuși
- Botoshan, from Botoșani
- Bucharest, from Bucharest
- Deyzh, from Dej
- Faltichan, from Fălticeni
- Margareten, from Marghita
- Nasod, from Năsăud
- Pashkan, from Pașcani
- Roman, from Roman
- Sasregen, from Reghin
- Seret, from Siret
- Shotz, from Suceava
- Shtefanesht, from Ștefănești
- Siget, from Sighetu-Marmației
- Temishvar, originating from Timișoara
- Vasloi, originating from Vaslui

== See also ==
- Antisemitism in Romania
- History of the Jews in Bessarabia
- History of the Jews in Bucharest
- History of the Jews in Bukovina
- History of the Jews in Carpathian Ruthenia
- History of the Jews in Hungary (details on Jewish history in Transylvania and Northern Transylvania)
- History of the Jews in Moldova
- History of the Jews in Transnistria
- Sephardic Jews in Romania
- Klezmer, a Jewish musical tradition in which Romanian influence is possibly the most important
- List of Romanian Jews
- List of synagogues in Romania
- Morărescu Affair
- National Day of Commemorating the Holocaust
- Patria disaster
- Romanian Jews in Israel
- Struma disaster
- Văcărești, Bucharest
