= Antisemitism in Romania =

Antisemitism in Romania manifested in the country's legislation during its early times following Romania's foundation as a modern state in the mid-19th century. Antisemitism increased considerably in Romania in the late-1930s and the 1940s, culminating with The Holocaust in Romania.

== The Danubian Principalities ==
Sporadic antisemitic legislation existed in Wallachia and Moldavia, the predecessors of the Romanian state, since the settlement of Jews in the area. As a non-Christian people coming mostly from the Ottoman Empire (almost all Jews in Wallachia were Sephardi at the time), their allegiance was considered dubious. Nevertheless, their community was usually given a large amount of autonomy.

The Russian-imposed quasi-constitutional document Regulamentul Organic demanded Jews to register with the local authority, specifying their occupation, so that the Jews who "cannot demonstrate their usefulness" could be identified and expelled.

During the Wallachian Revolution of 1848, the Proclamation of Islaz demanded the emancipation of the Jews, but the eventual defeat of the revolution meant that its clauses were not applied.

== Pre-WWI Kingdom of Romania ==
=== Citizenship ===
When Romania was formed by the unification of Moldavia and Wallachia, Jewish residents did not become citizens of the new state. Prince Alexandru Ioan Cuza announced in 1865 a project which would lead to the "gradual emancipation of the people of Mosaic faith", however, all the plans were canceled as Cuza was deposed the following year. After Cuza was deposed, Article 7 of the 1866 Constitution of Romania did not allow non-Christians to become citizens of the United Principalities of Romania, so Jews could not become citizens unless they converted to Christianity. The change in outlook can be explained by the weakening of the liberalism which led to the 1848 Revolution and its replacement with nationalism.

As a result of the Russo-Turkish War (1877–1878), Romania gained its independence and at the Congress of Berlin of 1878, the nations of Europe recognized it, with the condition of making all citizens, regardless of ethnic origin or religious beliefs, equal under law. In 1879, the Parliament of Romania grudgingly removed the constitution article which barred Jews from becoming citizens. However naturalization was still a cumbersome process requiring a personal petition and the approval of the Parliament on individual cases.

The result was that very few Jews were naturalized: between 1866 and 1904, only 2000 people of Jewish faith were naturalized, of which 888 were granted citizenship for their participation in the Russo-Turkish War.

=== Economic discrimination ===
The Prince and later King of Romania, Carol I was an antisemite and the Liberal Interior Minister Ion Brătianu began some tightening of policies against Jews. In 1867 he demanded the prefects to enforce the regulations about the "Jewish vagabonds" and therefore stop the Jewish immigration into Romania and prevent their settlement into villages. One year later, the Chamber of Deputies received a draft law project that would attempt to eliminate the Jews from economic activity in the villages.

The policies of the other major party, the Conservative Party, regarding the Jews were similar to those of the Liberals. For instance, in 1873, the Lascăr Catargiu government introduced a law regarding the sale of alcoholic beverages which tried to remove the near-monopoly Jews had on these products.

The Jews of Romania protested against the economic and political discrimination they faced and gained support from Western European Jewish organizations such as the Paris-based Alliance Israélite Universelle, which attempted to put pressure on Romania with the help of sympathetic politicians.

Romanian legislation generally discriminated against the people who were not citizens of Romania (such as were most Jews) and as such, Jews were not allowed to hold certain offices.

== Interwar Romania ==
=== Citizenship ===
Several laws from 1919 to 1924 granted Jews in Romania Romanian citizenship, although the restrictive conditions excluded some from citizen rights. The effects of these laws were cancelled from 1936. In early 1938, the far-right Goga cabinet started a systematic "revision" of citizenship rights, which was continued by King Carol II after his coup of February 10, 1938. It left about 36% of the "revised" Jews without citizenship and, due to heavy taxes imposed on them, without access to work. The antisemitic laws of August 1940 did not distinguish any more between Jews with or without citizenship.

=== The laws of August 1940 ===
Already in June 1940, Jews had been banned from Carol II's single party. After the cession of Bessarabia and Northern Bukovina to the USSR later that month, antisemitism was used to divert from this disaster. In July 1940, Carol II's regime issued a first definition of "Jew". On August 9, 1940, two antisemitic laws were published, which were based on the Hungarian and Italian law. The people whom the laws defined as "Jews" were divided into three categories. Most Jews lost their right to work in a series of professions. Jews were banned from non Jewish schools. Marriages between ethnic Romanians and Jews were forbidden.

== See also ==
- History of the Jews in Romania
- Morărescu Affair
