= Morărescu Affair =

- Location: Romanian-Soviet Border
- Date: 1925
- Attack type: Massacre
- Victims: 200 Jews killed More Christians "terribly maltreated"
- Perpetrators: Lieutenant Morărescu; Romanian Border Police
- Motive: Antisemitism
- Accused: 20
- Convicted: 0

The Morărescu Affair was a massacre in 1925, of 200 Soviet Jewish refugees along the Romanian-Soviet Border as they were first detained and then executed on the orders of the far-right, antisemitic, corrupt Romanian Border Police soldier, Lieutenant Morărescu. The trial and subsequent acquittal in 1925 of Morărescu and his unit caused a large controversy in Romania and abroad.

== Massacre ==
According to testimony from Morărescu's trial, he first sent several of the soldiers under his command across the river to lure the refugees into Romania by promising them that when they would be allowed into Romania if they each bribed Morărescu with 100 Chervonets. After they crossed the river, Morărescu had them robbed of all their possessions before forcing them all to drink and dance with him until the early hours of the morning. Once morning arrived all the refugees were brought to the frontier station and all the Jews were killed while the Christian refugees were "terribly mistreated" but eventually let go. Morărescu himself killed at least 1 victim, though he later boasted of killing up to 135 personally, while the soldiers under his command killed the rest of the victims.

== Aftermath ==
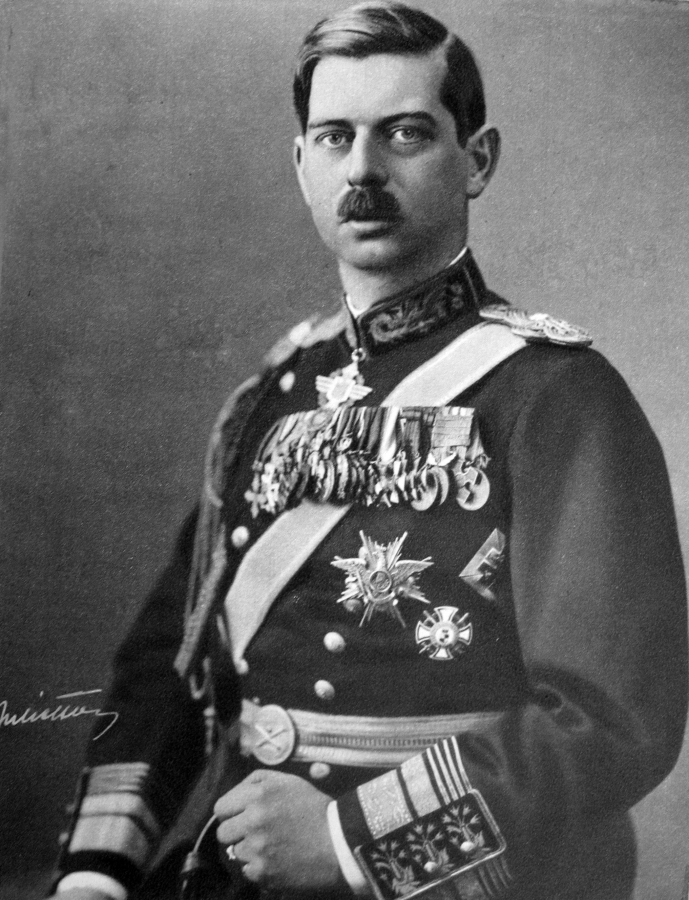
Carol II, King of Romania

Morărescu and 19 of those under his command were put on trial for various charges relating to the massacre. Morărescu defended himself by saying that he was acting on orders from Commanding Officers of the 3rd Army Corps to shoot those attempted to cross the border on sight, despite not shooting the victims on sight and letting some of them go. They were tried in a military court and despite the overwhelming nature of the evidence, all the defendants were found not guilty on all counts. During the trial there was an obvious rift between the civil and military authorities, with King Carol II having the Royal Commission investigating the military for bias in favor of the defendants, who responded by having an investigation against the Royal Commission launched. Soon his acquittal, Morărescu went on a tour of Bukovina with fascist politician and terrorist Zelea Codreanu inciting murder against Jews, boasting "I have killed 135 Jews myself, and I am going to kill a lot more".

The acquittal caused an immense amount of controversy inside of Romania with semi-official government newspapers praising Morărescu as a martyr while others such as the left-wing newspaper Averudul lambasting the ruling as "[standing] alone in the criminal history of civilized nations". The acquittal also received condemnation from the Council of the International Union for the Defense of Human Rights, which responded by drafting a law for the League of Nations guaranteeing the rights of emigrants, which was never adopted. When they heard about the decision, large parts of the international public were outraged with Romania.

Morărescu went on to join the Iron Guard, encountering difficulties due to his embezzlement and insulting of the Romanian Border Police.
