= List of settlements in Ialomița County =

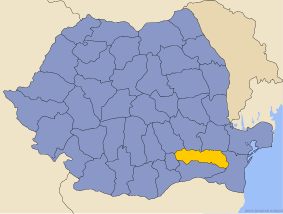
Ialomița County in Romania

This is a list of settlements in Ialomița County, Romania.

The following are the county's cities and towns, along with their attached villages:

City/Town	Villages
Slobozia	
Fetești	Buliga, Fetești-Gară, Vlașca
Urziceni	
Amara	
Căzănești	
Fierbinți-Târg	Fierbinții de Jos, Fierbinții de Sus, Grecii de Jos
Țăndărei	

The following are the county's communes, with component villages:

Commune	Villages
Adâncata	Adâncata, Patru Frați
Albești	Albești, Bataluri, Marsilieni
Alexeni	Alexeni
Andrășești	Andrășești, Orboești
Armășești	Armășești, Malu Roșu, Nenișori
Axintele	Axintele, Bărbătescu, Horia
Balaciu	Balaciu, Copuzu, Crăsanii de Jos, Crăsanii de Sus
Bărbulești	Bărbulești
Bărcănești	Bărcănești, Condeești
Borănești	Borănești, Sintești
Bordușani	Bordușani, Cegani
Bucu	Bucu
Buești	Buești
Ciocârlia	Ciocârlia, Cotorca
Ciochina	Bordușelu, Ciochina, Orezu, Piersica
Ciulnița	Ciulnița, Ion Ghica, Ivănești, Poiana
Cocora	Cocora
Colelia	Colelia
Cosâmbești	Cosâmbești, Gimbășani
Coșereni	Coșereni
Drăgoești	Chiroiu-Pământeni, Chiroiu-Satu Nou, Chiroiu-Ungureni, Drăgoești, Valea Bisericii
Dridu	Dridu, Dridu-Snagov
Făcăeni	Făcăeni, Progresu
Gârbovi	Gârbovi
Gheorghe Doja	Gheorghe Doja
Gheorghe Lazăr	Gheorghe Lazăr
Giurgeni	Giurgeni
Grindu	Grindu
Grivița	Smirna
Gura Ialomiței	Gura Ialomiței, Luciu
Ion Roată	Broșteni, Ion Roată
Jilavele	Jilavele, Slătioarele
Maia	Maia
Manasia	Manasia
Mărculești	Mărculești
Mihail Kogălniceanu	Hagieni, Mihail Kogălniceanu
Miloșești	Miloșești, Nicolești, Tovărășia
Moldoveni	Moldoveni
Movila	Movila
Movilița	Bițina-Pământeni, Bițina-Ungureni, Movilița
Munteni-Buzău	Munteni-Buzău
Ograda	Ograda
Perieți	Perieți, Fundata, Misleanu, Păltinișu, Stejaru
Platonești	Lăcusteni, Platonești
Rădulești	Movileanca, Rădulești, Răsimnicea
Reviga	Crunți, Mircea cel Bătrân, Reviga, Rovine
Roșiori	Roșiori
Sălcioara	Rași, Sălcioara
Sărățeni	Sărățeni
Săveni	Frățilești, Săveni
Scânteia	Iazu, Scânteia
Sfântu Gheorghe	Butoiu, Malu, Sfântu Gheorghe
Sinești	Boteni, Cătrunești, Hagiești, Lilieci, Livedea, Sinești
Stelnica	Maltezi, Retezatu, Stelnica
Sudiți	Gura Văii, Sudiți
Traian	Traian
Valea Ciorii	Bucșa, Dumitrești, Murgeanca, Valea Ciorii
Valea Măcrișului	Grindași, Valea Măcrișului
Vlădeni	Vlădeni
