= Sfântu Gheorghe minibus accident =

2019 road incident in Romania

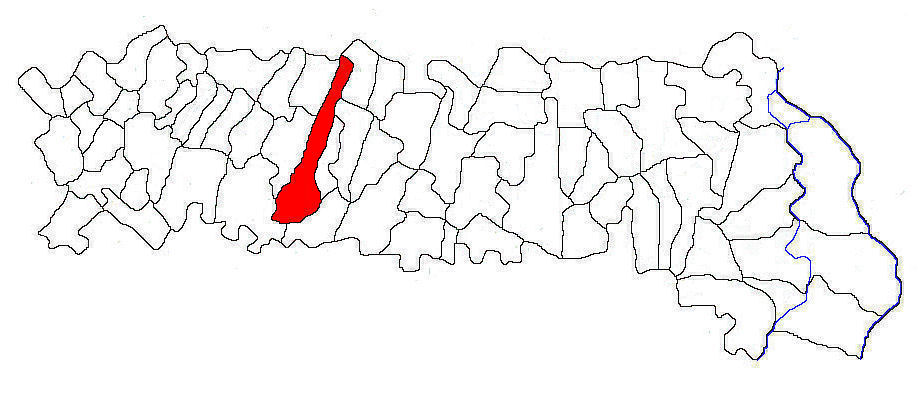
- Location within the county

Details
- Date: October 5, 2019
- Location: Sfântu Gheorghe, Ialomița County, Romania

Statistics
- Deaths: 10
- Injured: 8

The Sfântu Gheorghe minibus accident took place on October 5, 2019 near Sfântu Gheorghe village in Ialomița County, in south-eastern Romania. It was the worst accident in Romania in recent years.

== Incident ==
The minibus had departed shortly before from the village of Munteni-Buzău, in Ialomița County, heading toward Bucharest. Around 5:00 a.m., the minibus, operated by CDI Transport Company, was struck by a truck traveling in the opposite direction. The truck driver is believed to have fallen asleep at the wheel, causing the vehicle to veer out of its lane. The victims were transported to Bagdasar Arseni and Floreasca hospitals in Bucharest.

== Reactions ==
The company Mega Image stated in a Facebook post: “According to the initial information provided by the spokesperson of IPJ Ialomița, the accident was caused by the driver of the truck, who entered the opposite lane and collided head-on with the minibus carrying our colleagues. We stand with the grieving families and will support them in all necessary steps.”

The Transport Minister, Răzvan Cuc, stated in a Facebook post: “As Romanians expect solutions from those responsible, especially in such situations, I have decided to convene an operational committee at 4:00 p.m., bringing together all relevant decision-makers to take the necessary measures to prevent such tragedies from happening again. There will be a period of intensified traffic checks aimed at identifying transport companies and drivers who do not comply with the law, and strict new measures will be enforced in this sector. My condolences to the families going through this difficult ordeal.”

The President of Romania, Klaus Iohannis, said during a campaign event for his re-election: “Today, I received terrible news. There was a tragic accident between Urziceni and Slobozia, resulting in ten deaths and nearly ten people seriously injured. It saddened me deeply. My condolences, I am truly sorry. We must understand that the lack of infrastructure can be just as deadly as corruption. This criminal negligence by the PSD is costing Romanian lives.”

== See also ==
- Scânteia train accident (2009)
- Huțani bus accident (1980)
- 2013 Podgorica bus crash
