= Valea Lată Sărată =

Valea Lată Sărată Strachina
- Location within Romania

Location
- Country: Romania
- Counties: Ialomița County
- Villages: Grivița, Iazu, Scânteia, Valea Ciorii

Physical characteristics
- Mouth: Ialomița
  - location: Țăndărei
  - coordinates: 44.6309°N 27.6290°E
- Length: 40 km (25 mi)
- Basin size: 806 km^{2} (311 sq mi)

Basin features
- Progression: Ialomița→ Danube→ Black Sea

The Valea Lată Sărată is a left tributary of the river Ialomița in Romania. It discharges into the Ialomița in Țăndărei. It flows through Lake Strachina. Its length is 40 km (25 mi) and its basin size is 806 km^{2} (311 sq mi).
