= Progresu =

Progresu may refer to several villages in Romania:

- Progresu, a village in Sohatu Commune, Călărași County
- Progresu, a village in Făcăeni Commune, Ialomița County
