= Ion Roată, Ialomița =

Ion Roată
- Commune
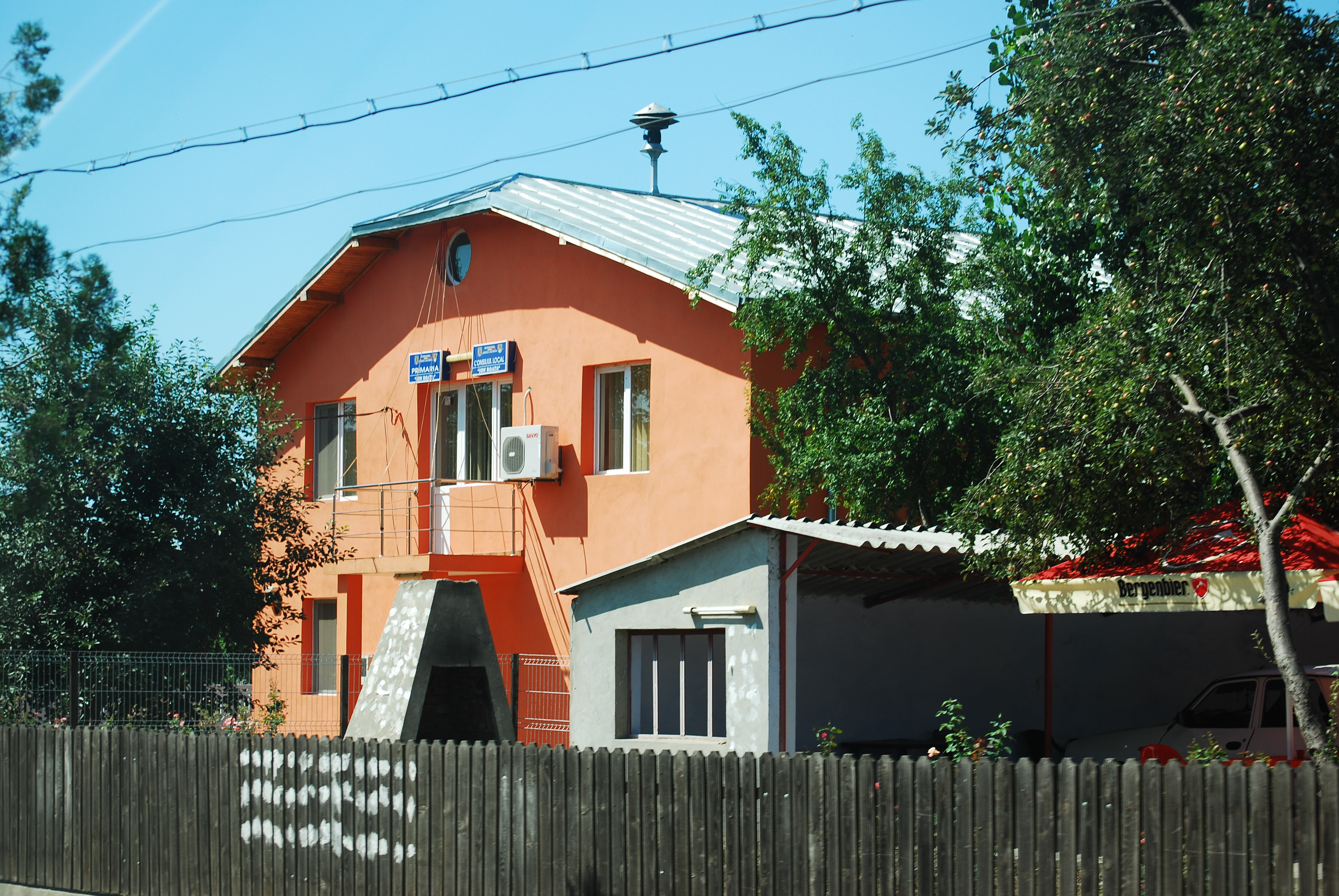
- Town Hall

- Location in Ialomița County

- Location in Romania
- Coordinates: 44°40′N 26°46′E
- Country: Romania
- County: Ialomița

Government
  - Mayor (2021–2024): Marinică Cazacu (Ind.)
- Area: 43.41 km^{2} (16.76 sq mi)
- Elevation: 45 m (148 ft)
- Population (2021-12-01): 3,476
  - Density: 80.07/km^{2} (207.4/sq mi)
- Time zone: UTC+02:00 (EET)
  - Summer (DST): UTC+03:00 (EEST)
- Postal code: 927150
- Area code: +(40) 243
- Vehicle reg.: IL
- Website: primariaionroata.ro

Ion Roată is a commune in Ialomița County, Muntenia, Romania. It is composed of two villages, Broșteni and Ion Roată.

The commune stretches for some 5 km (3 mi) along the Ialomița River valley; Ion Roată village is to the east and Broșteni to the west. It lies in the center of the Bărăgan Plain, and the terrain is largely flat and arid. About 86.5% of the surface area is arable land, 6.5% forests, 3% waters, 2% buildings, 1.5% roads, and 0.5% unproductive terrain. Valea Măcrișului is to the north; to the south, the river forms the border with Axintele; Sfântu Gheorghe is to the east and Alexeni to the west. There is a Căile Ferate Române rail station in the commune center; Urziceni is 12 km (7.5 mi) distant and the county seat Slobozia 50 km (31 mi).

The oldest mention of part of the commune dates to 1582, when a Cioara village appears in a document of Mihnea Turcitul. As of 1778, the area belonged to the Grindu plasă. Between 1864 and 1882, the commune passed through various administrative changes, but from the latter date until after World War I, its villages were Principesa Maria (named after Princess Maria), Broștenii Noi, Slujitori, and Malu. During the interwar period, they were Broștenii Vechi, Principesa Maria and Cioara (formerly Slujitori). In 1948, with the advent of the communist regime, the villages were Ion Roată (formerly Principesa Maria), Broștenii Noi (earlier a commune), Broștenii Vechi, and Cioara. By 1968, when a new administrative law was passed, Cioara had become Colinele; that village plus Broștenii Vechi was merged into Ion Roată, leaving the commune with its present two villages.

Historical population
Year	Pop.	±%
1899	1,092	—
1925	3,039	+178.3%
2002	3,726	+22.6%
2011	3,752	+0.7%
2021	3,476	−7.4%
Source: Census data

At the 2011 census, the commune had 3,752 inhabitants; of those for whom data were available, 87.4% were Romanians and 12.5% Roma. 99.9% of inhabitants were Romanian Orthodox. At the 2021 census, Ion Roată had a population of 3,476; of those, 82.91% were Romanians and 11.68% Roma.
