= Sintești =

Sintești may refer to several villages in Romania:

- Sintești, a village in Borănești Commune, Ialomița County
- Sintești, a village in Vidra Commune, Ilfov County
- Sintești, a village in Margina Commune, Timiș County
