= Drăgoești =

Drăgoești may refer to several places in Romania:

- Drăgoești, Ialomița, a commune in Ialomița County
- Drăgoești, Vâlcea, a commune in Vâlcea County
