= Hagieni =

Hagieni may refer to several villages in Romania:

- Hagieni, a village in Limanu Commune, Constanţa County
- Hagieni, a village in Mihail Kogălniceanu, Ialomița
