= Colelia =

- Commune
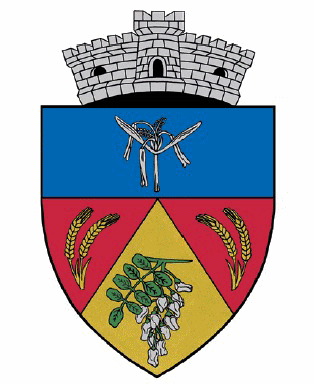
- Coat of arms

- Location in Ialomița County

- Location in Romania
- Coordinates: 44°45′40″N 27°00′24″E
- Country: Romania
- County: Ialomița

Government
  - Mayor (2020–2024): Nichita Niță (PSD)
- Area: 34.59 km^{2} (13.36 sq mi)
- Elevation: 59 m (194 ft)
- Population (2021-12-01): 989
  - Density: 28.6/km^{2} (74.1/sq mi)
- Time zone: UTC+02:00 (EET)
  - Summer (DST): UTC+03:00 (EEST)
- Postal code: 927086
- Area code: +(40) 243
- Vehicle reg.: IL
- Website: colelia.judetulialomita.ro

Colelia is a commune located in Ialomița County, Muntenia, Romania. It is composed of a single village, Colelia, part of Cocora Commune until 2005.

Historical population
Year	Pop.	±%
1899	1,044	—
1925	1,280	+22.6%
2002	1,414	+10.5%
2011	1,212	−14.3%
2021	989	−18.4%
Source: Census data
