= Făcăeni =

- Commune
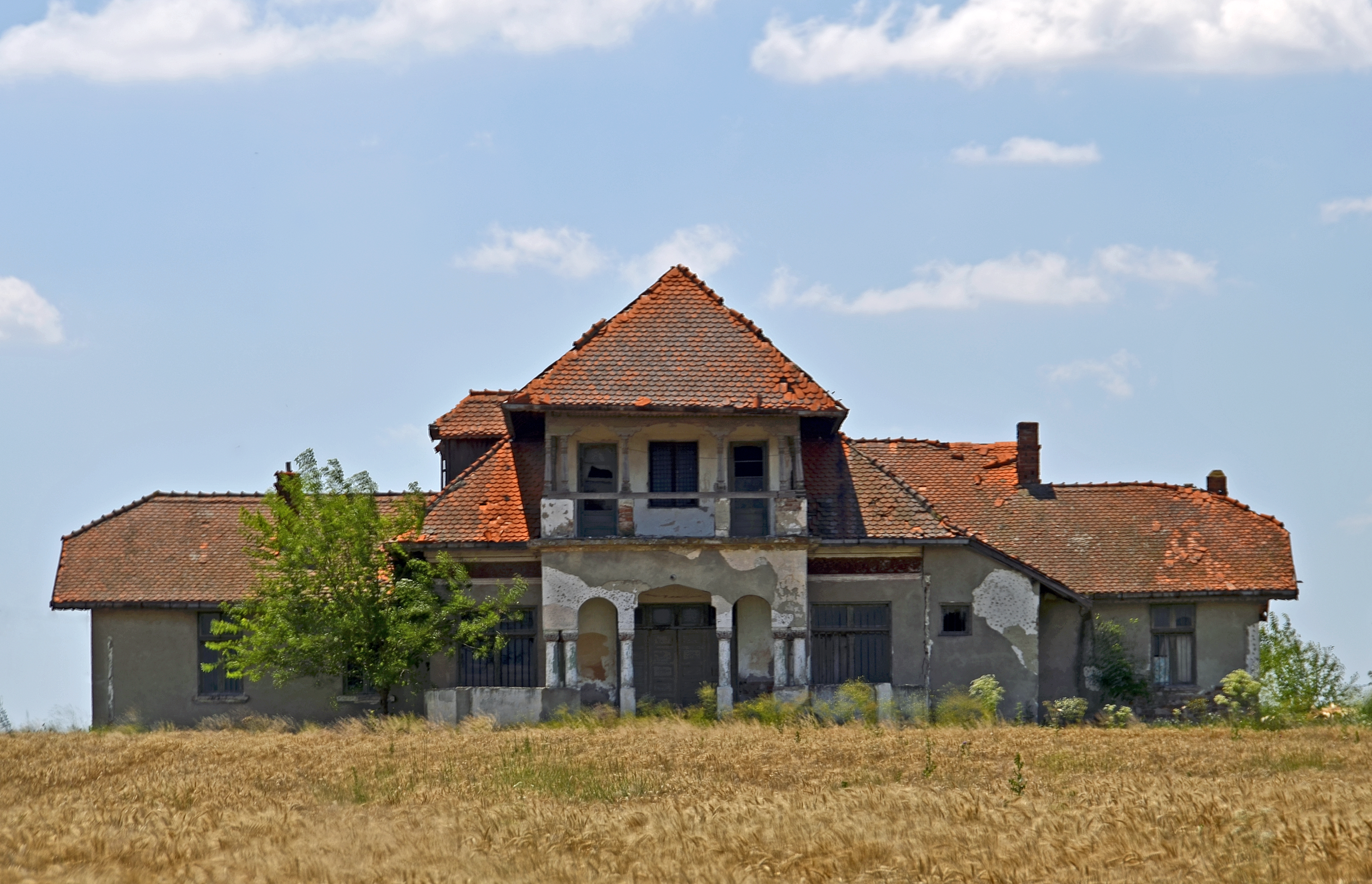
- Aurelian Bentoiu mansion

- Location in Ialomița County

- Location in Romania
- Coordinates: 44°34′12″N 27°54′00″E
- Country: Romania
- County: Ialomița

Government
  - Mayor (2024–2028): Daniel Marian Alexandrescu (AUR)
- Area: 238.32 km^{2} (92.02 sq mi)
- Elevation: 19 m (62 ft)
- Population (2021-12-01): 4,899
  - Density: 20.56/km^{2} (53.24/sq mi)
- Time zone: UTC+02:00 (EET)
  - Summer (DST): UTC+03:00 (EEST)
- Postal code: 927110
- Area code: +(40) 243
- Vehicle reg.: IL
- Website: comunafacaeni.ro

Făcăeni is a commune in Ialomița County, Muntenia, Romania. Its population was 4,899 at the 2021 census. The commune is composed of two villages, Făcăeni and Progresu.

== Geography ==
Făcăeni is located near the Borcea branch of the river Danube and the National Road DN3B. It's neighbored by Vlădeni to the north, Bordușani to the south, Movila to the west, and Topalu to the east. It has a ferryboat used by farmers and workers to get from the village to the Balta Ialomiței (the island situated between the Old Danube and the Borcea section, used exclusively for agriculture). On the bank of the Borcea there is also a small beach where locals come to play football and swim.

== History ==
The village's existence has been documented for more than 500 years, but archaeological discoveries prove that the area has been inhabited since at least the Iron Age. Its name is supposed to come from either the Romanian "făcău", archaism for "mill", or the word "flăcău" meaning young man.

== Economy ==
Făcăeni had and still has a mostly agrarian economy, even though fishing is still an important occupation. Many inhabitants now seek employment in larger cities or even in other countries.

A wind farm was built in 2017, taking advantage of the wind strength that is sometimes damaging to crops.

The village has one school, General School grades I–X, one kindergarten, three Orthodox churches and two Adventist churches.

Făcăeni is known for having been hit by a tornado on 12 August 2002, a phenomenon highly unusual for this geographical area, which destroyed more than 30 households and part of the forest east of the village.

Historical population
Year	Pop.	±%
1899	995	—
1925	3,803	+282.2%
2002	5,953	+56.5%
2011	5,438	−8.7%
2021	4,899	−9.9%
Source: Census data

== Natives ==
- Ștefan Bănulescu (1926–1998), author
- Aurelian Bentoiu (1892–1962), lawyer and politician
- Vasilica Ghiță Ene (1954–), journalist and poet
- Gheorghe Zgură (1935–2008), engineer and academic
