= Ciochina =

- Commune
- Location in Ialomița County

- Location in Romania
- Coordinates: 44°35′N 27°4′E
- Country: Romania
- County: Ialomița

Government
  - Mayor (2024–2028): Vasile Câmpulungeanu (PNL)
- Area: 74.46 km^{2} (28.75 sq mi)
- Elevation: 41 m (135 ft)
- Population (2021-12-01): 2,766
  - Density: 37.15/km^{2} (96.21/sq mi)
- Time zone: UTC+02:00 (EET)
  - Summer (DST): UTC+03:00 (EEST)
- Postal code: 927075
- Area code: +(40) 243
- Vehicle reg.: IL
- Website: www.primariaciochina.ro

Ciochina is a commune located in Ialomița County, Muntenia, Romania. It is composed of four villages: Bordușelu, Ciochina, Orezu, and Piersica.

Historical population
| Year | Pop. | ±% |
|---|---|---|
| 1899 | 979 | — |
| 1925 | 1,201 | +22.7% |
| 2002 | 3,601 | +199.8% |
| 2011 | 3,217 | −10.7% |
| 2021 | 2,766 | −14.0% |
Source: Census data
