= Bărcănești, Ialomița =

Bărcănești
- Commune
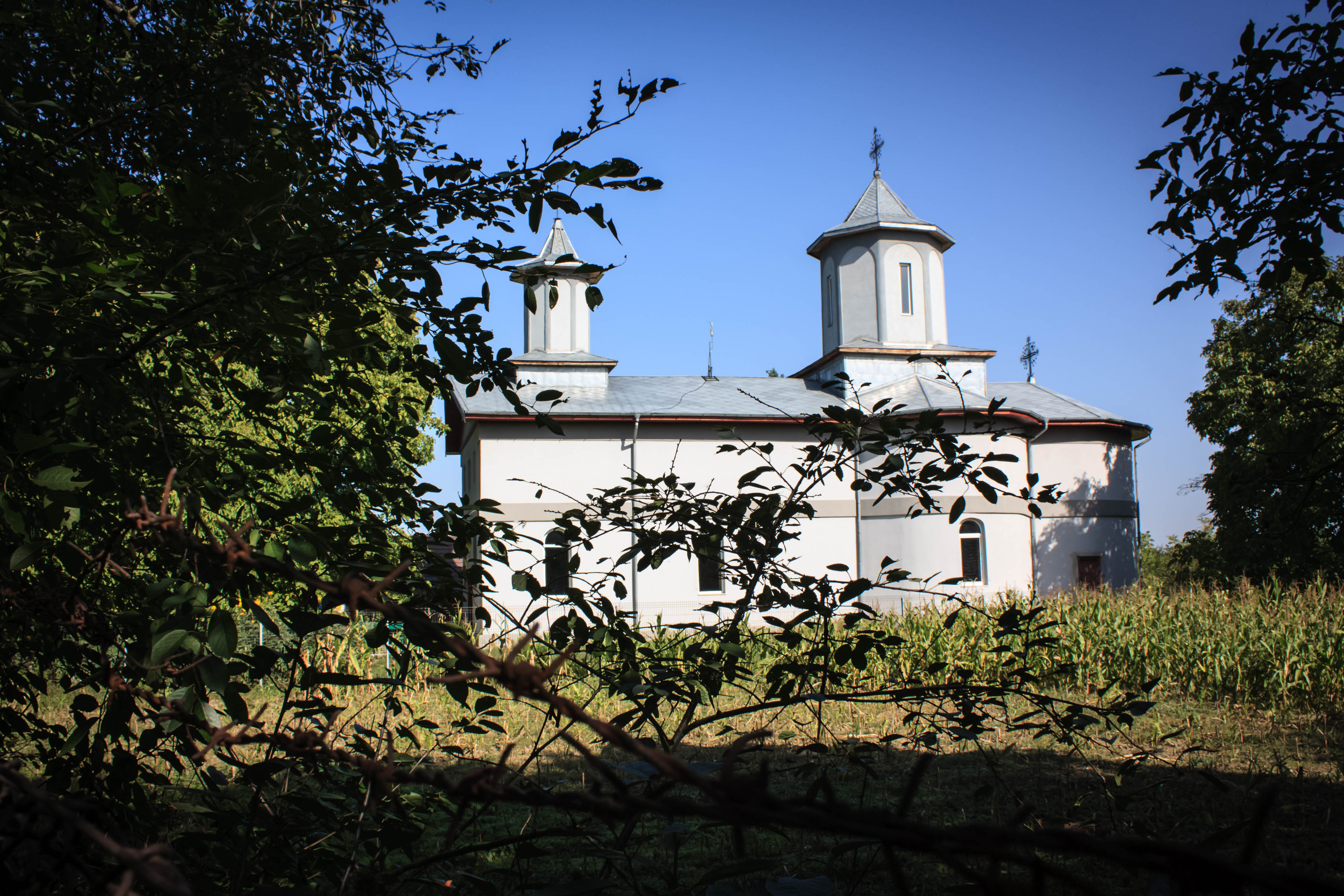
- Saints Constantine and Helena Church in Bărcănești

- Location in Ialomița County

- Location in Romania
- Coordinates: 44°38′N 26°39′E
- Country: Romania
- County: Ialomița

Government
  - Mayor (2020–2024): Nicolae Radu (PSD)
- Area: 92.43 km^{2} (35.69 sq mi)
- Elevation: 58 m (190 ft)
- Highest elevation: 73 m (240 ft)
- Lowest elevation: 47 m (154 ft)
- Population (2021-12-01): 3,536
  - Density: 38.26/km^{2} (99.08/sq mi)
- Time zone: UTC+02:00 (EET)
  - Summer (DST): UTC+03:00 (EEST)
- Postal code: 927045
- Area code: +(40) 243
- Vehicle reg.: IL
- Website: www.primariabarcanesti.ro

Bărcănești is a commune located in Ialomița County, Muntenia, Romania. It is composed of two villages, Bărcănești and Condeești.

Historical population
Year	Pop.	±%
1899	1,727	—
1925	3,635	+110.5%
2002	3,978	+9.4%
2011	3,895	−2.1%
2021	3,536	−9.2%
Source: Census data
