= Andrășești =

- Commune
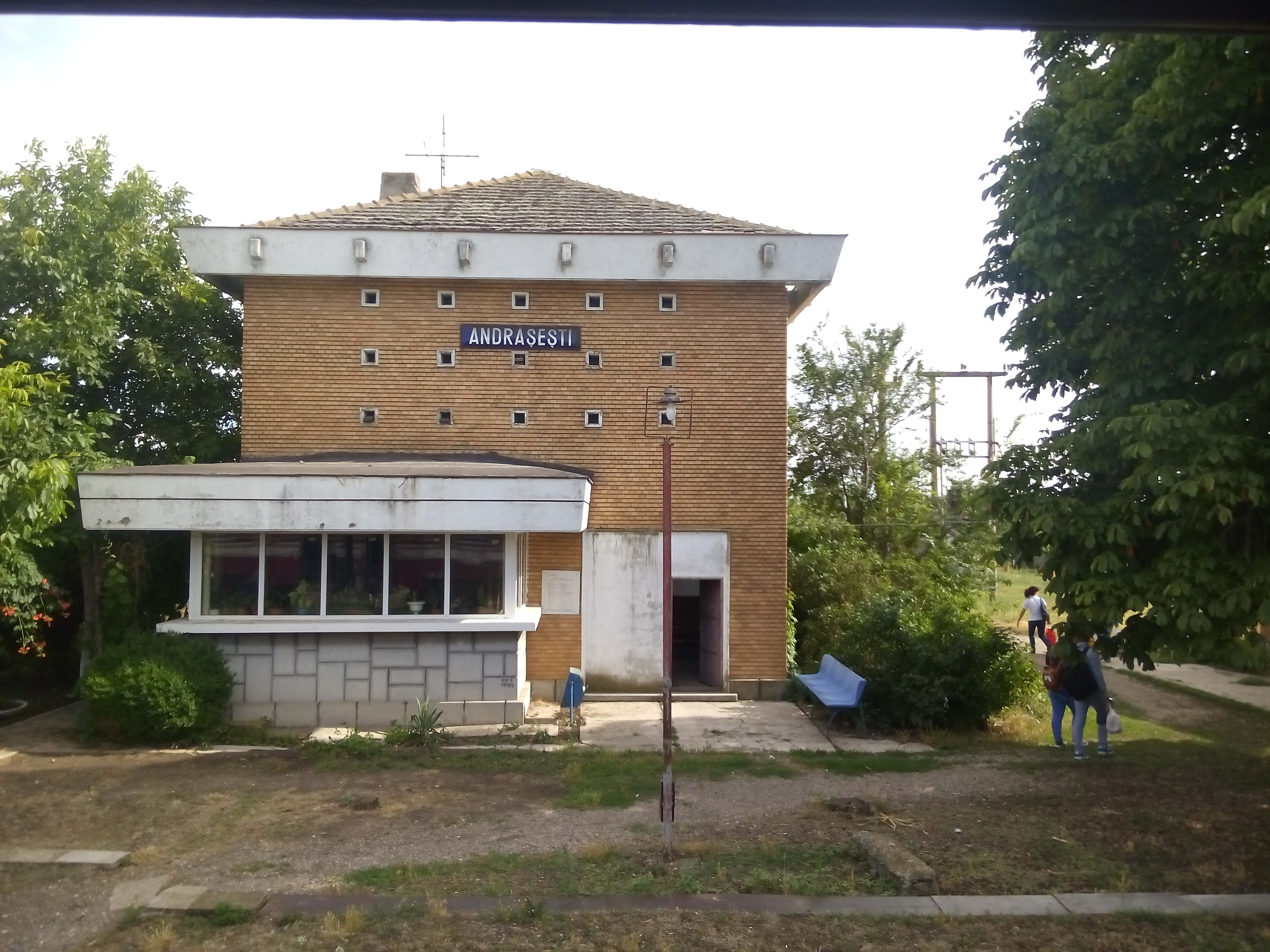
- The Andrășești train station

- Location in Ialomița County

- Location in Romania
- Coordinates: 44°34′N 27°8′E
- Country: Romania
- County: Ialomița

Government
  - Mayor (2020–2024): Adrian Vasile (PNL)
- Area: 46.28 km^{2} (17.87 sq mi)
- Elevation: 36 m (118 ft)
- Population (2021-12-01): 1,801
  - Density: 38.92/km^{2} (100.8/sq mi)
- Time zone: UTC+02:00 (EET)
  - Summer (DST): UTC+03:00 (EEST)
- Postal code: 927025
- Area code: +(40) 243
- Vehicle reg.: IL
- Website: primaria-andrasesti.ro

Andrășești is a commune located in Ialomița County, Muntenia, Romania. It is composed of two villages, Andrășești and Orboești.

The commune lies in the Bărăgan Plain, at an altitude of 36 m (118 ft), on the banks of the Ialomița River. It is located in the central part of Ialomița County, 18 km (11 mi) west of the county seat, Slobozia.

Andrășești is crossed by the national road DN2A, which starts in Urziceni, 44 km (27 mi) to the east, continues to Slobozia, and ends in the port city of Constanța, on the Black Sea coast. The Andrășești train station serves the CFR Line 701, which connects Slobozia to Ploiești.

Historical population
Year	Pop.	±%
1899	938	—
1925	1,293	+37.8%
2002	2,311	+78.7%
2011	2,212	−4.3%
2021	1,801	−18.6%
Source: Census data
