= Traian, Ialomița =

Traian
- Commune
- Location in Ialomița County

- Location in Romania
- Coordinates: 44°46′N 27°20′E
- Country: Romania
- County: Ialomița

Government
  - Mayor (2024–2028): Georgian Corbu (PNL)
- Area: 40.04 km^{2} (15.46 sq mi)
- Elevation: 39 m (128 ft)
- Population (2021-12-01): 3,007
  - Density: 75.10/km^{2} (194.5/sq mi)
- Time zone: UTC+02:00 (EET)
  - Summer (DST): UTC+03:00 (EEST)
- Postal code: 927147
- Area code: +(40) 243
- Vehicle reg.: IL
- Website: www.primariatraian.ro

Traian is a commune located in Ialomița County, Muntenia, Romania. It is composed of a single village, Traian.

Historical population
Year	Pop.	±%
2002	3,311	—
2011	3,168	−4.3%
2021	3,007	−5.1%
Source: Census data
