= Gârbovi =

- Commune
- Location in Ialomița County

- Location in Romania
- Coordinates: 44°47′N 26°46′E
- Country: Romania
- County: Ialomița

Government
  - Mayor (2024–2028): Vasile Popa (USR)
- Area: 89.03 km^{2} (34.37 sq mi)
- Elevation: 69 m (226 ft)
- Population (2021-12-01): 3,434
  - Density: 38.57/km^{2} (99.90/sq mi)
- Time zone: UTC+02:00 (EET)
  - Summer (DST): UTC+03:00 (EEST)
- Postal code: 927120
- Area code: +(40) 243
- Vehicle reg.: IL
- Website: www.garbovi.ro

Gârbovi is a commune located in Ialomița County, Muntenia, Romania. It is composed of a single village, Gârbovi.

Historical population
Year	Pop.	±%
1899	2,659	—
1925	3,885	+46.1%
2002	4,457	+14.7%
2011	3,958	−11.2%
2021	3,434	−13.2%
Source: Census data
