= Munteni-Buzău =

- Commune
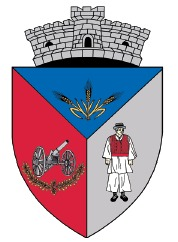
- Coat of arms

- Location in Ialomița County

- Location in Romania
- Coordinates: 44.639°N 26.973°E
- Country: Romania
- County: Ialomița

Government
  - Mayor (2020–2024): Florin Stan (PSD)
- Area: 51 km^{2} (20 sq mi)
- Elevation: 41 m (135 ft)
- Population (2021-12-01): 2,936
  - Density: 58/km^{2} (150/sq mi)
- Time zone: UTC+02:00 (EET)
  - Summer (DST): UTC+03:00 (EEST)
- Postal code: 927185
- Area code: +(40) 243
- Vehicle reg.: IL
- Website: www.primariamuntenibuzau.ro

Munteni-Buzău is a commune in Ialomița County, Muntenia, Romania, composed of a single village, Munteni-Buzău. It is situated at 89 km (55 mi) from Bucharest on the European highway E60. In 2021, it had a population of 2,936 people and its neighbors are the town Căzănești and the Sărățeni commune.

Historical population
Year	Pop.	±%
1925	1,745	—
2002	3,867	+121.6%
2011	3,428	−11.4%
2021	2,936	−14.4%
Source: Census data
