= Stelnica =

- Commune
- Location in Ialomița County

- Location in Romania
- Coordinates: 44°25′N 27°53′E
- Country: Romania
- County: Ialomița

Government
  - Mayor (2024–2028): Costel Brateș (PSD)
- Area: 134.83 km^{2} (52.06 sq mi)
- Elevation: 57 m (187 ft)
- Population (2021-12-01): 1,649
  - Density: 12.23/km^{2} (31.68/sq mi)
- Time zone: UTC+02:00 (EET)
  - Summer (DST): UTC+03:00 (EEST)
- Postal code: 927230
- Area code: +(40) 243
- Vehicle reg.: IL
- Website: www.stelnica.ro

Stelnica is a commune located in Ialomița County, Muntenia, Romania. It is composed of three villages: Maltezi, Retezatu, and Stelnica.

Historical population
Year	Pop.	±%
1899	1,700	—
1925	2,098	+23.4%
2002	1,855	−11.6%
2011	1,774	−4.4%
2021	1,649	−7.0%
Source: Census data
