= Balta Ialomiței =

Coordinates: 44.502872°N 27.995224°E

Balta Ialomiței is an island on the Danube, located in Ialomița County and Călărași County, Romania. It is surrounded by two branches of the Danube, Borcea and Dunărea Veche (Romanian for "the Old Danube"). The island has an area of 831.3 km^{2} (321.0 sq mi), with a length of 94 km (58 mi) and a width of 5 to 12.5 kilometres (3.1 to 7.8 mi). The average height is 10 to 17 metres (33 to 56 ft).

Originally a wetland, the island was covered with marshes, woods, lakes, and ponds, but some of the land was reclaimed for agriculture. Occasionally, some of these regions are still flooded. The A2 freeway passes through it.

== Gallery ==
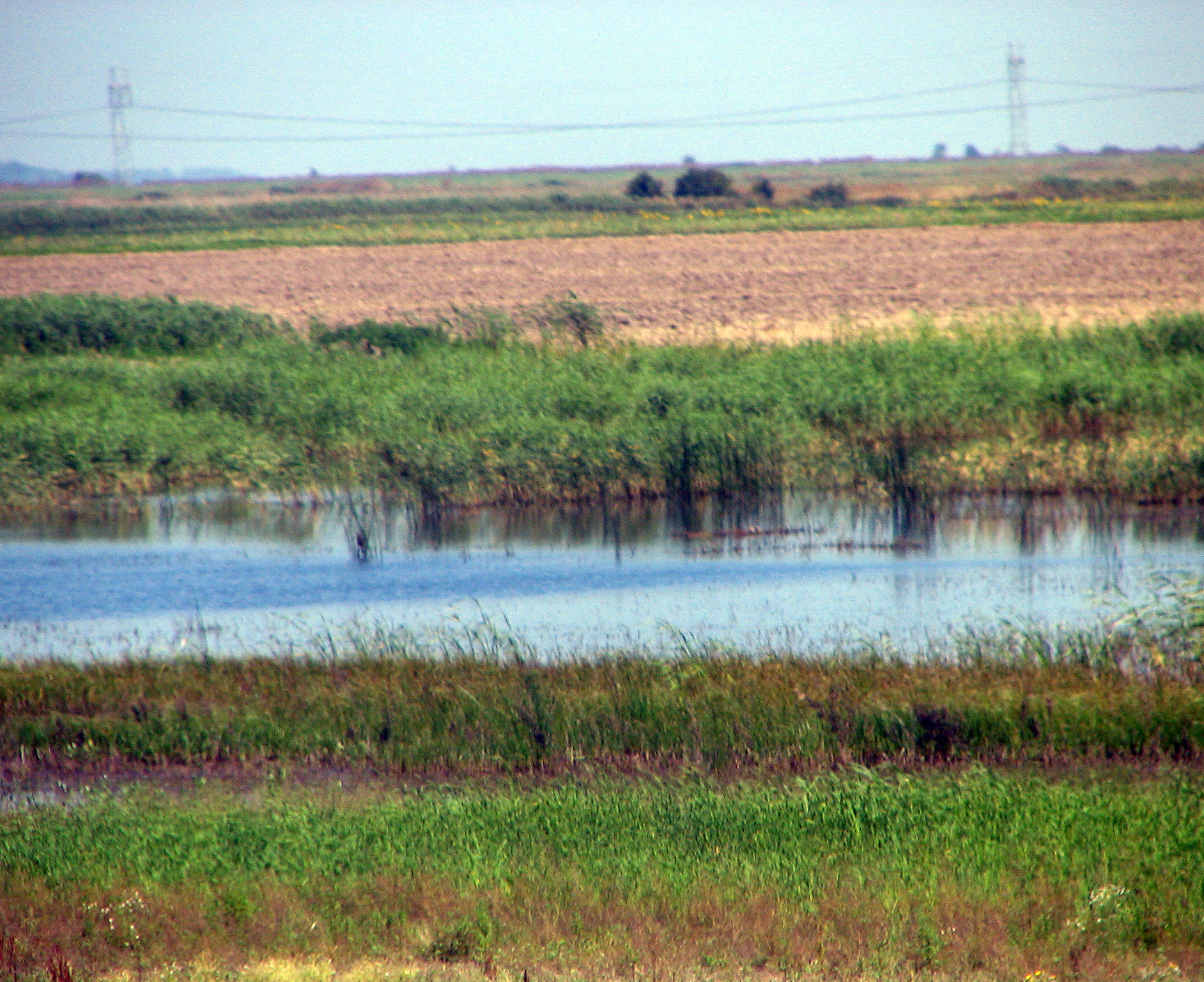
A pond in Balta Ialomiței

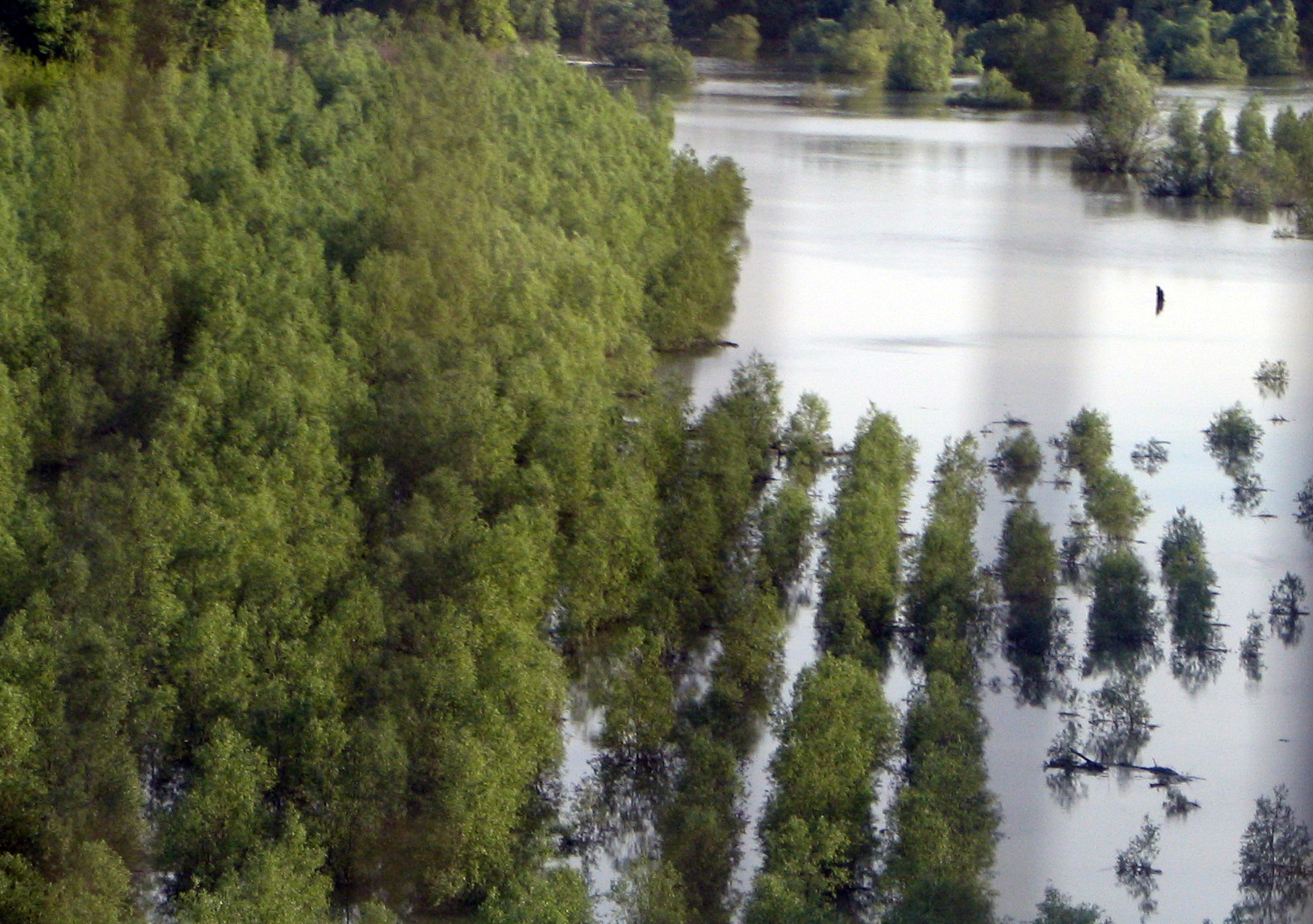
Balta Ialomiței, being flooded in April/May 2006

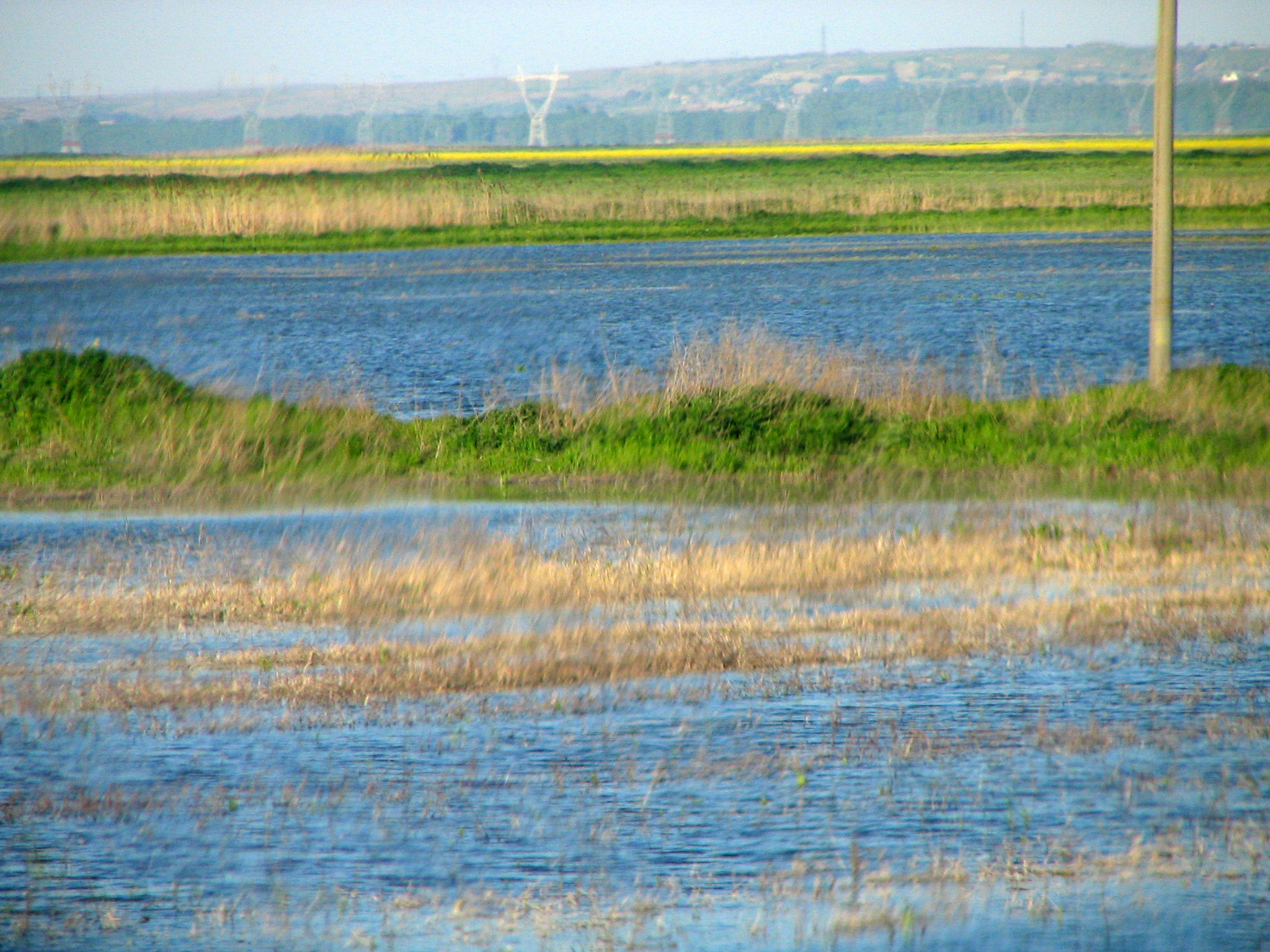
An agricultural field being flooded
