= Sălcioara, Ialomița =

Sălcioara
- Commune
- Location in Ialomița County

- Location in Romania
- Coordinates: 44°32′N 26°53′E
- Country: Romania
- County: Ialomița

Government
  - Mayor (2024–2028): Gabriel Stoica (PSD)
- Area: 50.02 km^{2} (19.31 sq mi)
- Elevation: 64 m (210 ft)
- Population (2021-12-01): 2,050
  - Density: 41.0/km^{2} (106/sq mi)
- Time zone: UTC+02:00 (EET)
  - Summer (DST): UTC+03:00 (EEST)
- Postal code: 927200
- Area code: +(40) 243
- Vehicle reg.: IL
- Website: primariasalcioara.ro

Sălcioara is a commune located in Ialomița County, Muntenia, Romania. It is composed of two villages, Rași and Sălcioara.

Historical population
Year	Pop.	±%
2002	2,613	—
2011	2,336	−10.6%
2021	2,050	−12.2%
Source: Census data
