= Bucu, Ialomița =

Bucu
- Commune
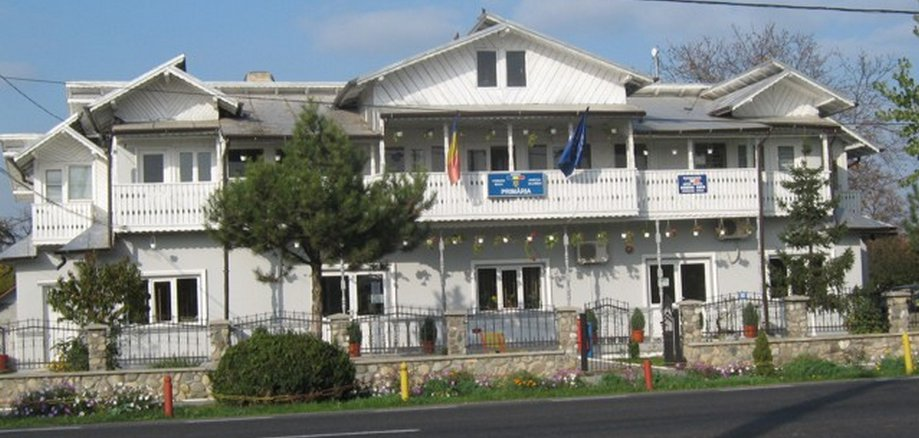
- Bucu town hall

- Location in Ialomița County

- Location in Romania
- Coordinates: 44°36′N 27°30′E
- Country: Romania
- County: Ialomița

Government
  - Mayor (2024–2028): Ion Drăgușin (PSD)
- Area: 43.01 km^{2} (16.61 sq mi)
- Elevation: 23 m (75 ft)
- Population (2021-12-01): 2,305
  - Density: 53.59/km^{2} (138.8/sq mi)
- Time zone: UTC+02:00 (EET)
  - Summer (DST): UTC+03:00 (EEST)
- Postal code: 927060
- Area code: +(40) 243
- Vehicle reg.: IL
- Website: www.primariabucu.ro

Bucu is a commune in Ialomița County, Muntenia, Romania. It is situated on the Ialomița River, between Bucharest and Constanța. It is composed of a single village, Bucu.

Historical population
Year	Pop.	±%
1899	2,285	—
1925	3,011	+31.8%
2002	2,418	−19.7%
2011	2,323	−3.9%
2021	2,305	−0.8%
Source: Census data

At the 2021 census, the commune had a population of 2,305; of those, 93.15% were Romanians.
