= Maia, Ialomița =

Maia
- Commune
- Location in Ialomița County

- Location in Romania
- Coordinates: 44°44′N 26°24′E
- Country: Romania
- County: Ialomița

Government
  - Mayor (2020–2024): Sorin Niculae (PRO)
- Area: 25.74 km^{2} (9.94 sq mi)
- Elevation: 75 m (246 ft)
- Population (2021-12-01): 1,651
  - Density: 64.14/km^{2} (166.1/sq mi)
- Time zone: UTC+02:00 (EET)
  - Summer (DST): UTC+03:00 (EEST)
- Postal code: 927056
- Area code: +(40) 243
- Vehicle reg.: IL
- Website: www.primariamaia.ro

Maia is a commune located in Ialomița County, Muntenia, Romania. It is composed of a single village, Maia.

The commune is situated in the Wallachian Plain, at an altitude of 75 m (246 ft). It lies on the right bank of the Prahova River; its right tributary, the river Maia, forms a reservoir in the middle of the commune.

Maia is located in the western part of Ialomița County, bordering on Ilfov County. It is 26 km (16 mi) from Urziceni and 89 km (55 mi) from the county seat, Slobozia. The national capital, Bucharest, is 48 km (30 mi) to the southwest, while the city of Ploiești is 44 km (27 mi) to the northwest.

Historical population
Year	Pop.	±%
1899	1,175	—
1925	1,500	+27.7%
2002	1,994	+32.9%
2011	1,847	−7.4%
2021	1,651	−10.6%
Source: Census data
