= Gheorghe Doja, Ialomița =

Gheorghe Doja
- Commune
- Location in Ialomița County

- Location in Romania
- Coordinates: 44°37′0″N 27°11′7″E
- Country: Romania
- County: Ialomița

Government
  - Mayor (2020–2024): Ion Curelea (PSD)
- Elevation: 28 m (92 ft)
- Population (2021-12-01): 2,230
- Time zone: UTC+02:00 (EET)
  - Summer (DST): UTC+03:00 (EEST)
- Postal code: 927125
- Area code: +(40) 243
- Vehicle reg.: IL
- Website: www.gheorghedojail.ro

Gheorghe Doja (colloquially known as Doja) is a commune in Ialomița County, Muntenia, Romania, 20 km (12 mi) away from Slobozia and 110 km (68 mi) from Bucharest. It is composed of a single village, Gheorghe Doja.

The village is located in the Bărăgan, in the Siman Valley (Valea lui Siman). Initially, the settlement was named Valea lui Siman, and, later, Principesa Elena (after Princess Elena of Romania). In 1948, after the onset of the Communist regime, the village was renamed to Gheorghe Doja, after György Dózsa.

There are two natural sites nearby: the Fundata Lake, and the Ialomița River.

The main occupation of the villagers is agriculture. In this village, the people cultivate watermelons which they sell throughout the country.

The village is near the European route E60 and 50 km (31 mi) away from A2 Romania highway.

Historical population
Year	Pop.	±%
2002	2,854	—
2011	2,555	−10.5%
2021	2,230	−12.7%
Source: Census data

== Image gallery ==
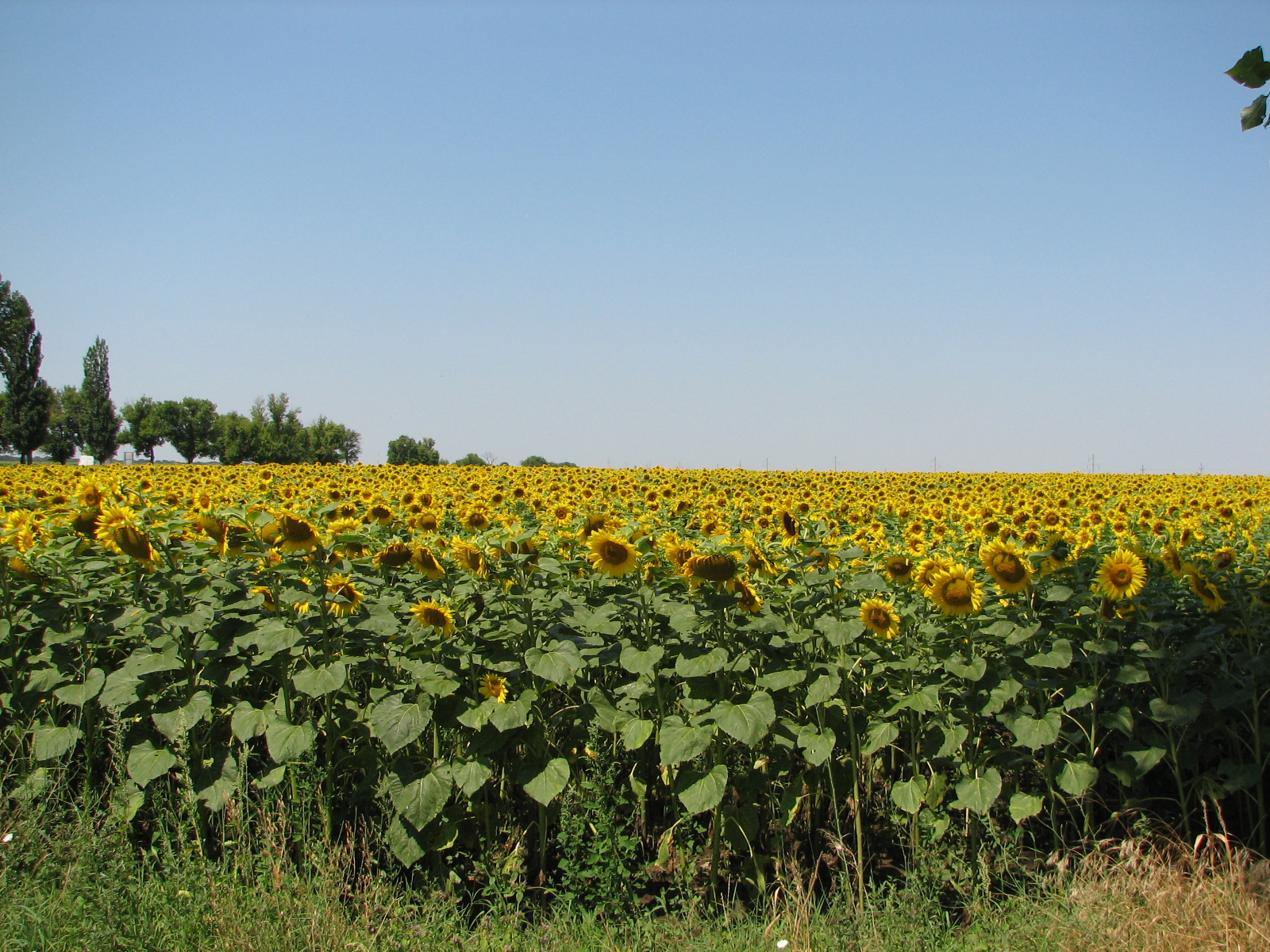
Sunflower crop

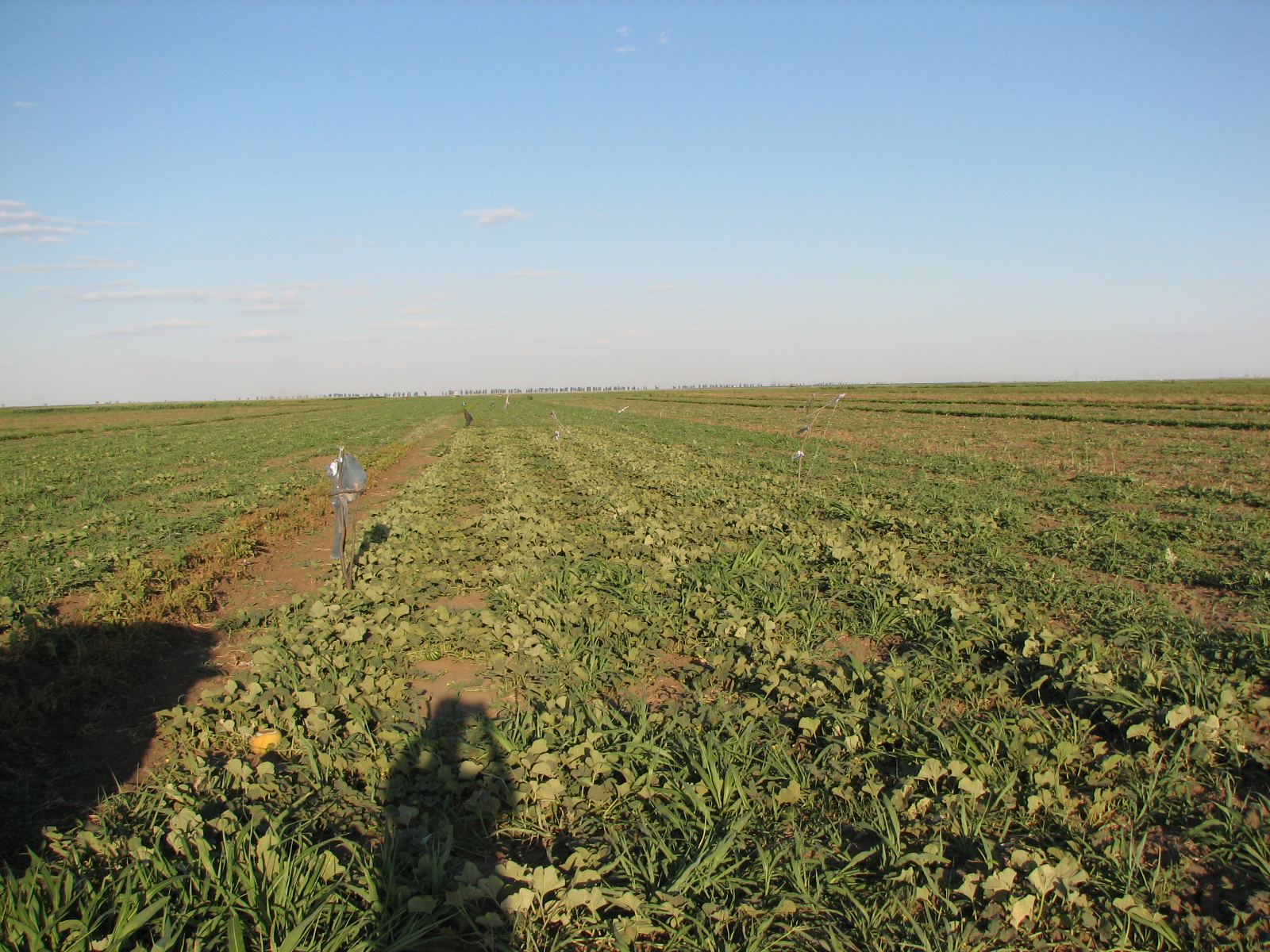
Watermelon culture

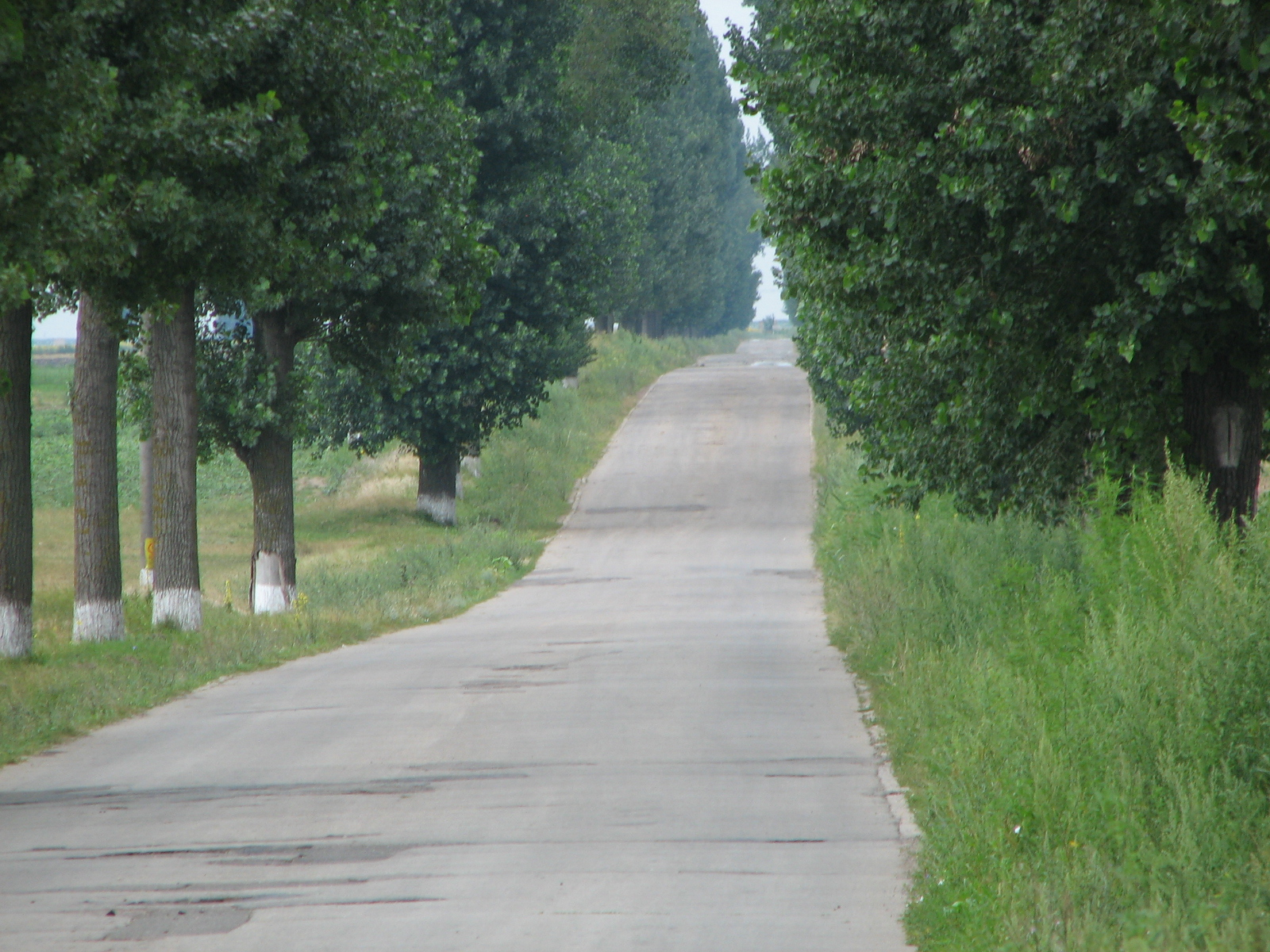
Along the road

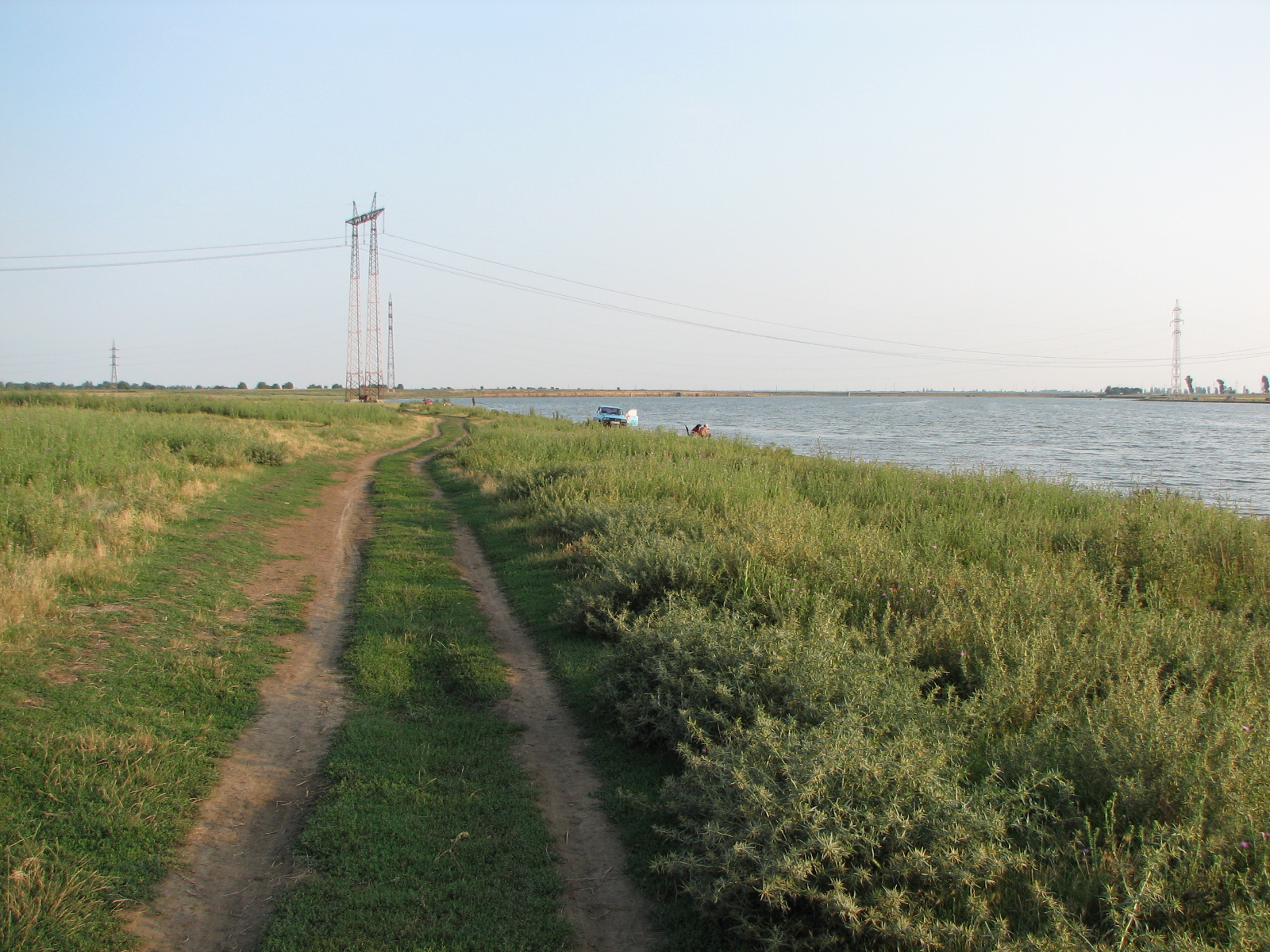
Dirt road toward the lake

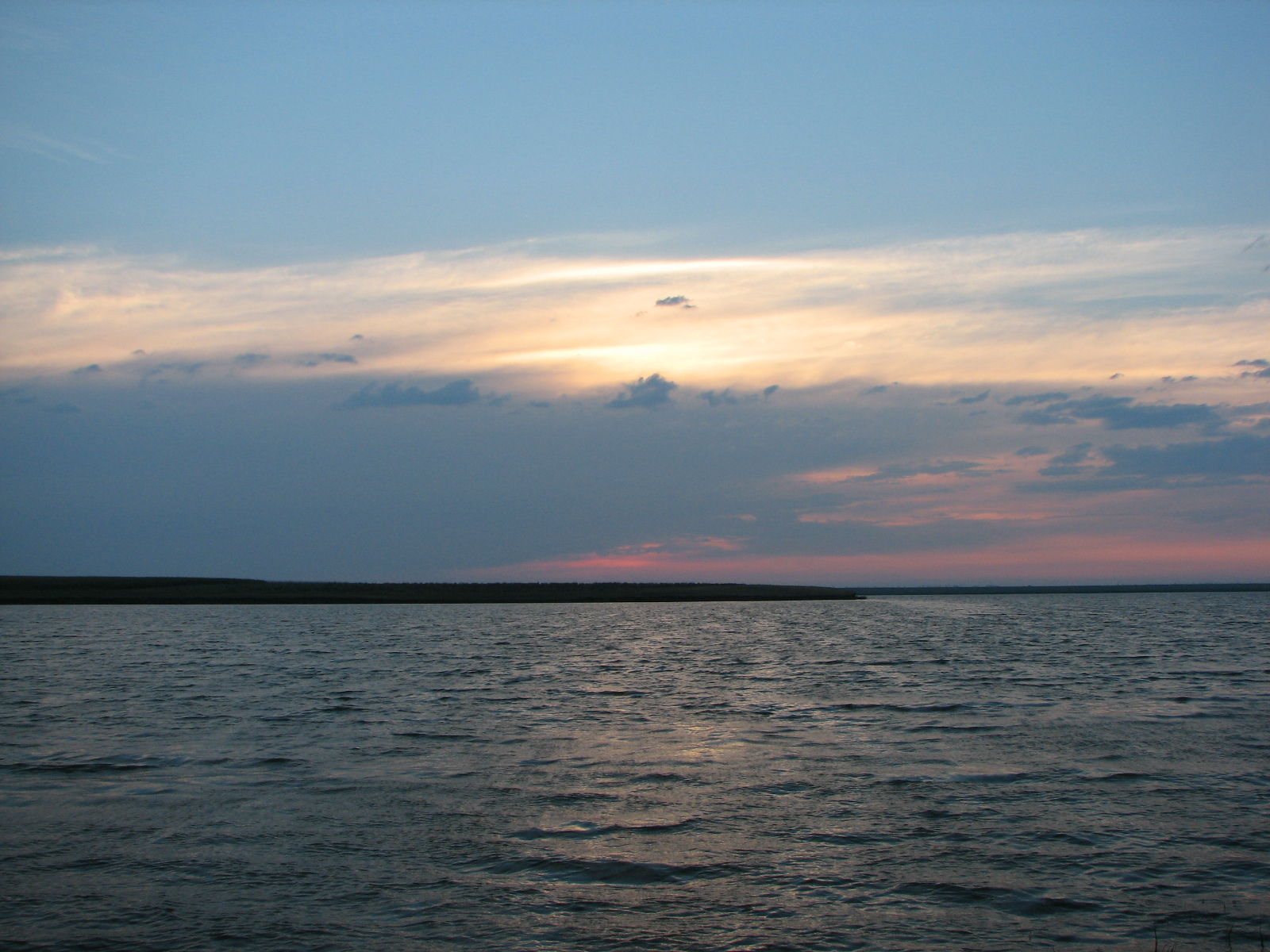
Sunset over the lake

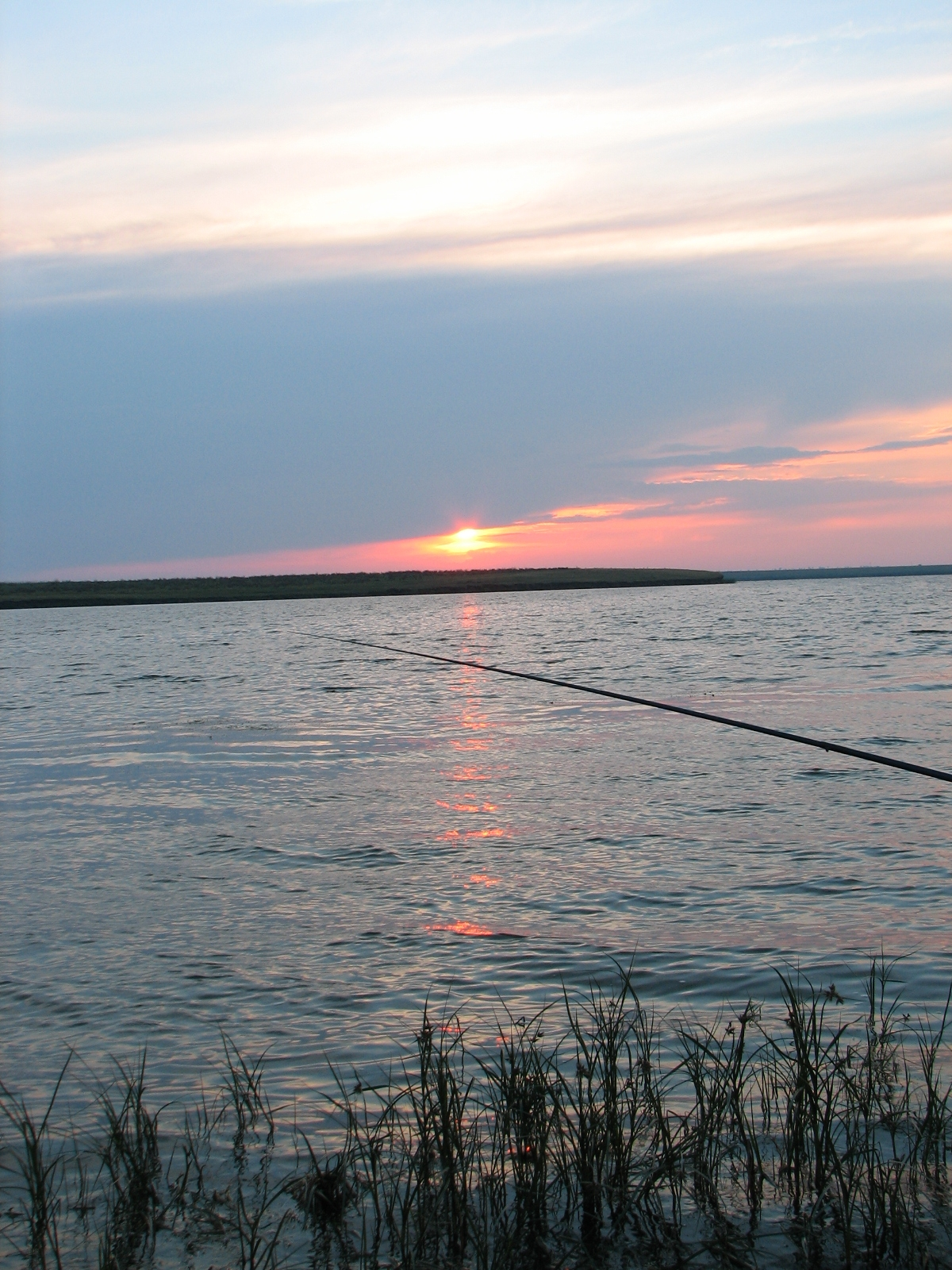
Fishing in sunset
