= Gheorghe Lazăr, Ialomița =

Gheorghe Lazăr
- Commune
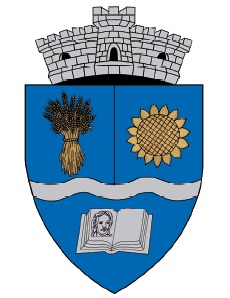
- Coat of arms

- Location in Ialomița County

- Location in Romania
- Coordinates: 44.633°N 27.456°E
- Country: Romania
- County: Ialomița

Government
  - Mayor (2024–2028): Elena Gabriela Zaharia (PSD)
- Area: 50.92 km^{2} (19.66 sq mi)
- Elevation: 27 m (89 ft)
- Population (2021-12-01): 2,092
  - Density: 41.08/km^{2} (106.4/sq mi)
- Time zone: UTC+02:00 (EET)
  - Summer (DST): UTC+03:00 (EEST)
- Postal code: 927130
- Area code: +(40) 243
- Vehicle reg.: IL
- Website: www.primariagheorghelazar.ro

Gheorghe Lazăr is a commune in Ialomița County, Muntenia, Romania. It is composed of a single village, Gheorghe Lazăr.

Historical population
Year	Pop.	±%
2002	2,497	—
2011	2,319	−7.1%
2021	2,092	−9.8%
Source: Census data
