= Roșiori, Ialomița =

Roșiori
- Commune
- Location in Ialomița County

- Location in Romania
- Coordinates: 44°37′N 26°32′E
- Country: Romania
- County: Ialomița

Government
  - Mayor (2024–2028): Ion Anghel (PSD)
- Area: 22.95 km^{2} (8.86 sq mi)
- Elevation: 67 m (220 ft)
- Population (2021-12-01): 1,942
  - Density: 84.62/km^{2} (219.2/sq mi)
- Time zone: UTC+02:00 (EET)
  - Summer (DST): UTC+03:00 (EEST)
- Postal code: 927183
- Area code: +(40) 243
- Vehicle reg.: IL
- Website: primariarosiori-il.ro

Roșiori is a commune located in Ialomița County, Muntenia, Romania. It is composed of a single village, Roșiori.

Historical population
Year	Pop.	±%
2002	2,202	—
2011	2,174	−1.3%
2021	1,942	−10.7%
Source: Census data
