= Grivița, Ialomița =

Grivița
- Commune
- Location in Ialomița County

- Location in Romania
- Coordinates: 44°44′N 27°17′E
- Country: Romania
- County: Ialomița

Government
  - Mayor (2024–2028): Vasile Stroe (PNL)
- Area: 74.64 km^{2} (28.82 sq mi)
- Elevation: 45 m (148 ft)
- Population (2021-12-01): 2,863
  - Density: 38.36/km^{2} (99.35/sq mi)
- Time zone: UTC+02:00 (EET)
  - Summer (DST): UTC+03:00 (EEST)
- Postal code: 927145
- Area code: +(40) 243
- Vehicle reg.: IL
- Website: www.primariagrivita.ro

Grivița is a commune located in Ialomița County, Muntenia, Romania. It is composed of two villages, Grivița and Smirna.

Historical population
Year	Pop.	±%
1899	2,531	—
1925	3,654	+44.4%
2002	3,796	+3.9%
2011	3,379	−11.0%
2021	2,863	−15.3%
Source: Census data
