= Cocora, Ialomița =

Cocora
- Commune
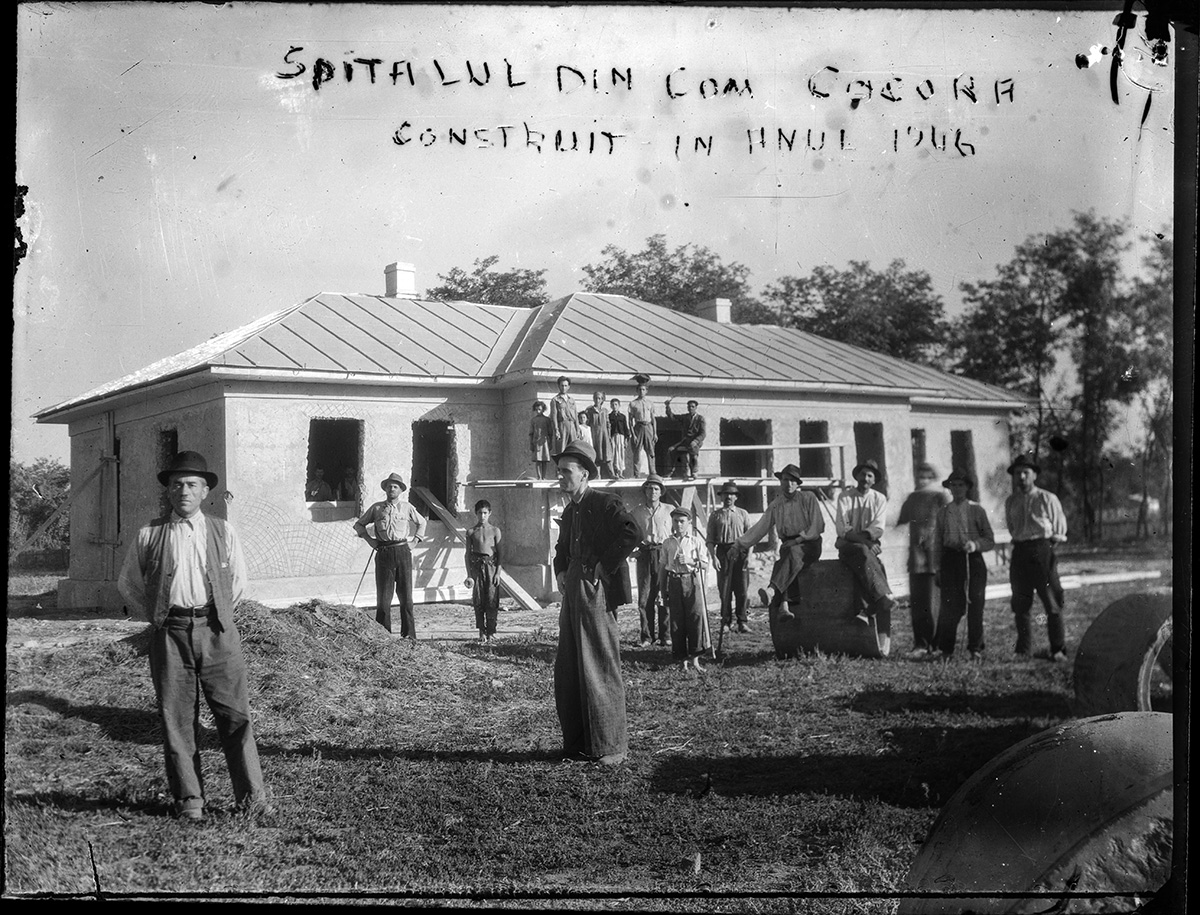
- Hospital in Cocora (1966)

- Location in Ialomița County

- Location in Romania
- Coordinates: 44°44′N 27°3′E
- Country: Romania
- County: Ialomița

Government
  - Mayor (2024–2028): Sorin Dănuț Lefter (PSD)
- Area: 50.08 km^{2} (19.34 sq mi)
- Elevation: 55 m (180 ft)
- Population (2021-12-01): 1,899
  - Density: 37.92/km^{2} (98.21/sq mi)
- Time zone: UTC+02:00 (EET)
  - Summer (DST): UTC+03:00 (EEST)
- Postal code: 927085
- Area code: +(40) 243
- Vehicle reg.: IL
- Website: www.comunacocora.ro

Cocora is a commune located in Ialomița County, Muntenia, Romania. The commune formerly included the village of Colelia, which was established as a separate commune in 2005.

Historical population
Year	Pop.	±%
2002	2,350	—
2011	2,058	−12.4%
2021	1,899	−7.7%
Source: Census data
