= Borănești =

- Commune
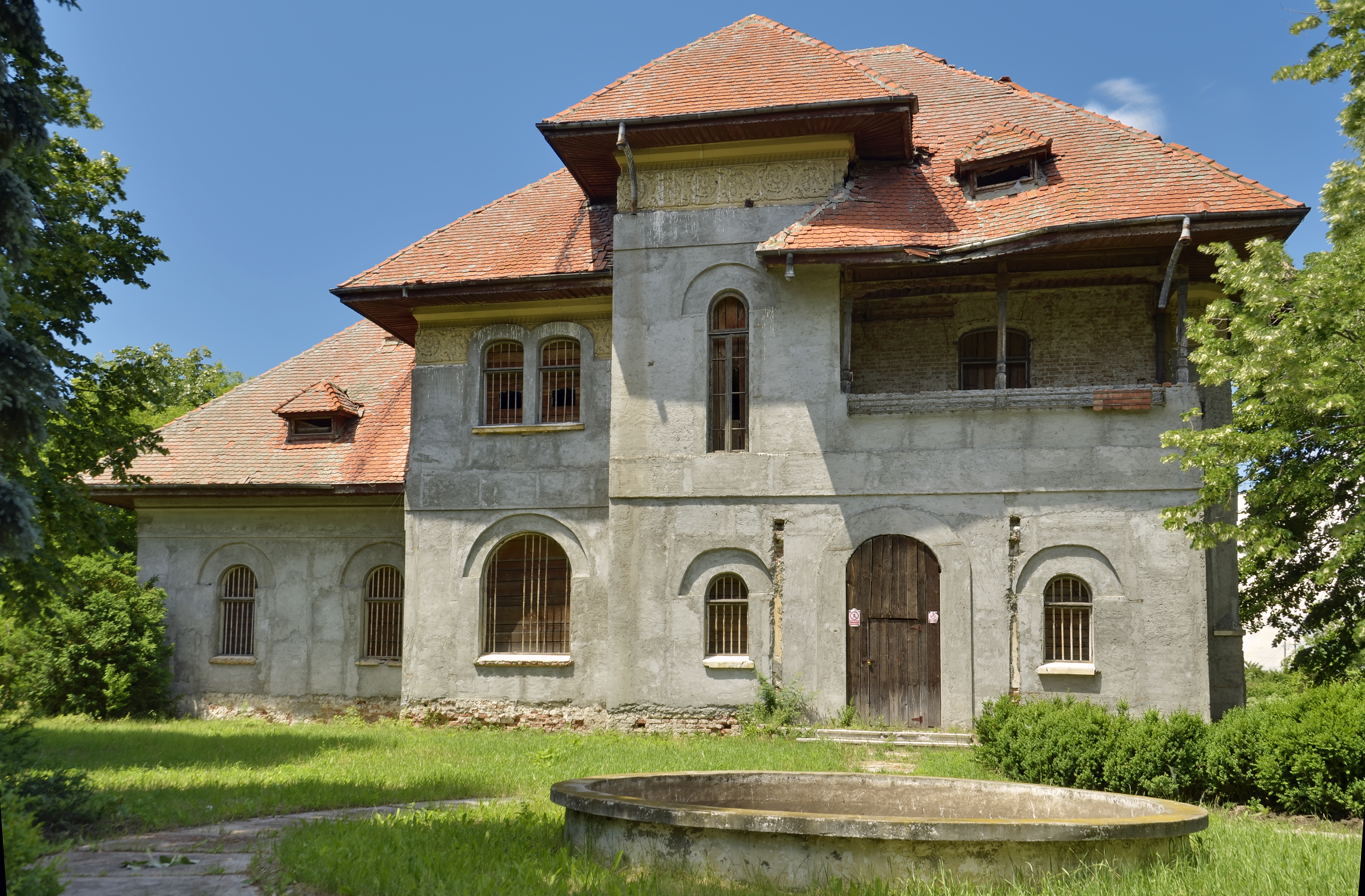
- Nicu Chiroiu mansion

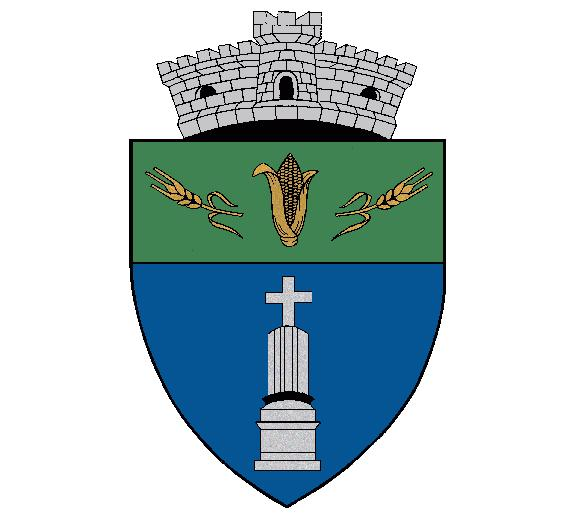
- Coat of arms

- Location in Ialomița County

- Location in Romania
- Coordinates: 44°40′N 26°36′E
- Country: Romania
- County: Ialomița

Government
  - Mayor (2020–2024): Ionuț Grecea (PNL)
- Area: 32.82 km^{2} (12.67 sq mi)
- Elevation: 53 m (174 ft)
- Population (2021-12-01): 2,397
  - Density: 73.03/km^{2} (189.2/sq mi)
- Time zone: UTC+02:00 (EET)
  - Summer (DST): UTC+03:00 (EEST)
- Postal code: 927045
- Area code: +(40) 243
- Vehicle reg.: IL
- Website: www.primariaboranesti.ro

Borănești is a commune located in Ialomița County, Muntenia, Romania. It is composed of two villages, Borănești and Sintești.

Historical population
Year	Pop.	±%
1899	1,384	—
1925	1,509	+9.0%
2002	2,360	+56.4%
2011	2,454	+4.0%
2021	2,397	−2.3%
Source: Census data
