= Valea Ciorii =

- Commune
- Location in Ialomița County

- Location in Romania
- Coordinates: 44°43′N 27°34′E
- Country: Romania
- County: Ialomița

Government
  - Mayor (2024–2028): Mihaela Roșu (PSD)
- Area: 52.45 km^{2} (20.25 sq mi)
- Elevation: 19 m (62 ft)
- Population (2021-12-01): 1,575
  - Density: 30.03/km^{2} (77.77/sq mi)
- Time zone: UTC+02:00 (EET)
  - Summer (DST): UTC+03:00 (EEST)
- Postal code: 927240
- Area code: +(40) 243
- Vehicle reg.: IL
- Website: primariavaleaciorii.ro

Valea Ciorii is a commune located in Ialomița County, Muntenia, Romania. It is composed of four villages: Bucșa, Dumitrești, Murgeanca, and Valea Ciorii.

Historical population
Year	Pop.	±%
1899	1,249	—
1925	1,821	+45.8%
2002	2,017	+10.8%
2011	1,855	−8.0%
2021	1,575	−15.1%
Source: Census data
