= Ialomița County =

County of Romania

Ialomița County Județul Ialomița
- County
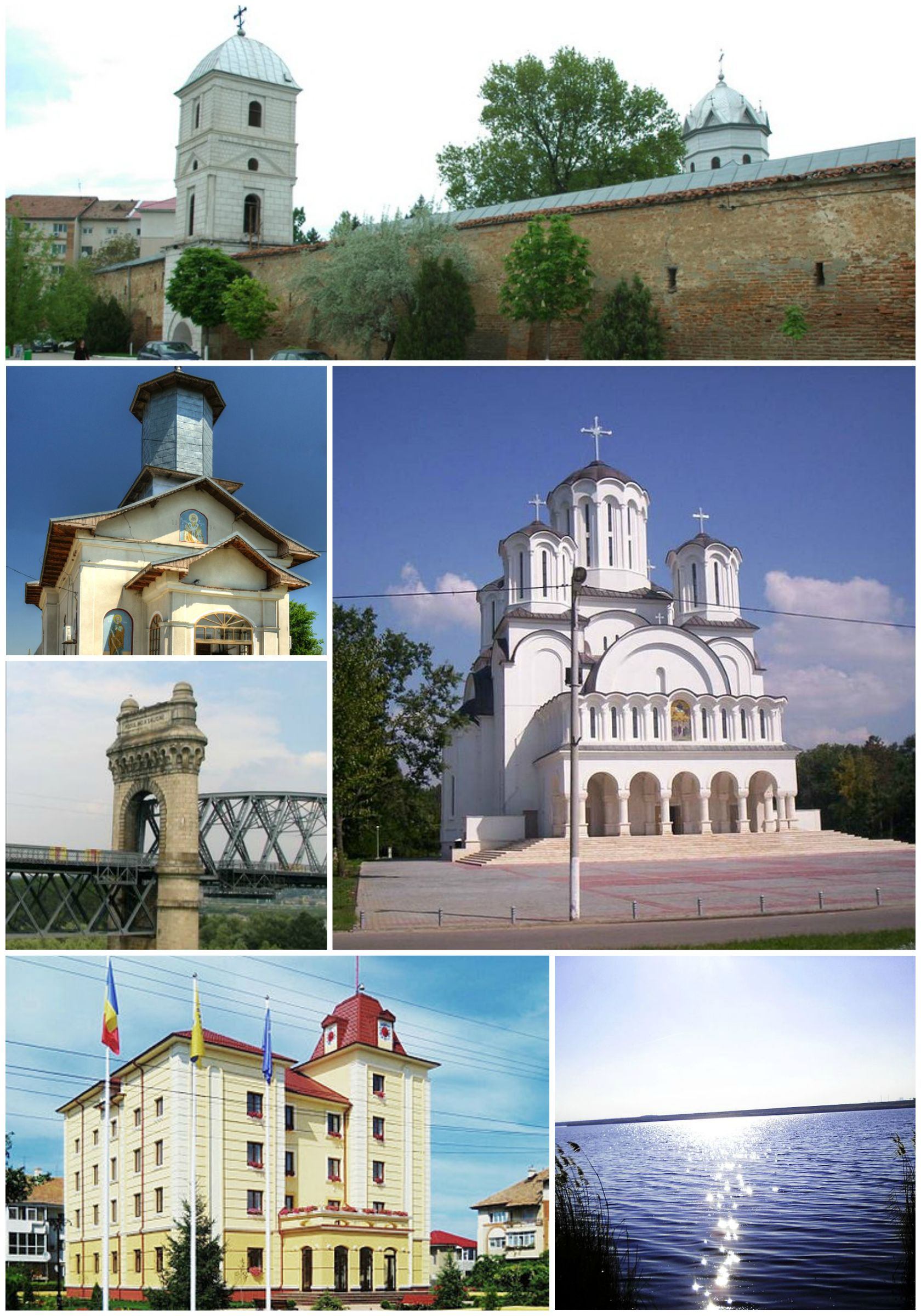

- Flag Coat of arms

- Coordinates: 44.64°N 27.3°E
- Country: Romania
- Development region: Sud
- Historical region: Muntenia
- Capital: Slobozia

Government
  - President of the County Board: Marian Pavel (PSD)
  - Prefect: Constantin Marin

Area
  - Total: 4,453 km^{2} (1,719 sq mi)
  - Rank: 35th

Population (2021-12-01)
  - Total: 250,816
  - Rank: 39th
  - Density: 56.33/km^{2} (145.9/sq mi)
- Telephone code: (+40) 243 or (+40) 343
- ISO 3166 code: RO-IL
- GDP (nominal): US$ 1.652 billion (2015)
- GDP/capita: US$ 6,384 (2015)
- Website: County Council; Prefecture

Ialomița County (Romanian pronunciation: [ˈjalomitsa]) is a county (județ) of Romania, in Muntenia, with the capital city at Slobozia.

== Demographics ==
In 2011, the county had a population of 258,669 and the population density was 58.08/km^{2}.

Romanians make up 95.6% of the population, the largest minority being the Romani people (4.1%).

Year	County population
1948	244,750
1956	274,655 ▲
1966	291,373 ▲
1977	295,965 ▲
1992	304,008 ▲
2002	296,572 ▼
2011	258,669 ▼
2021	250,816 ▼

== Geography ==
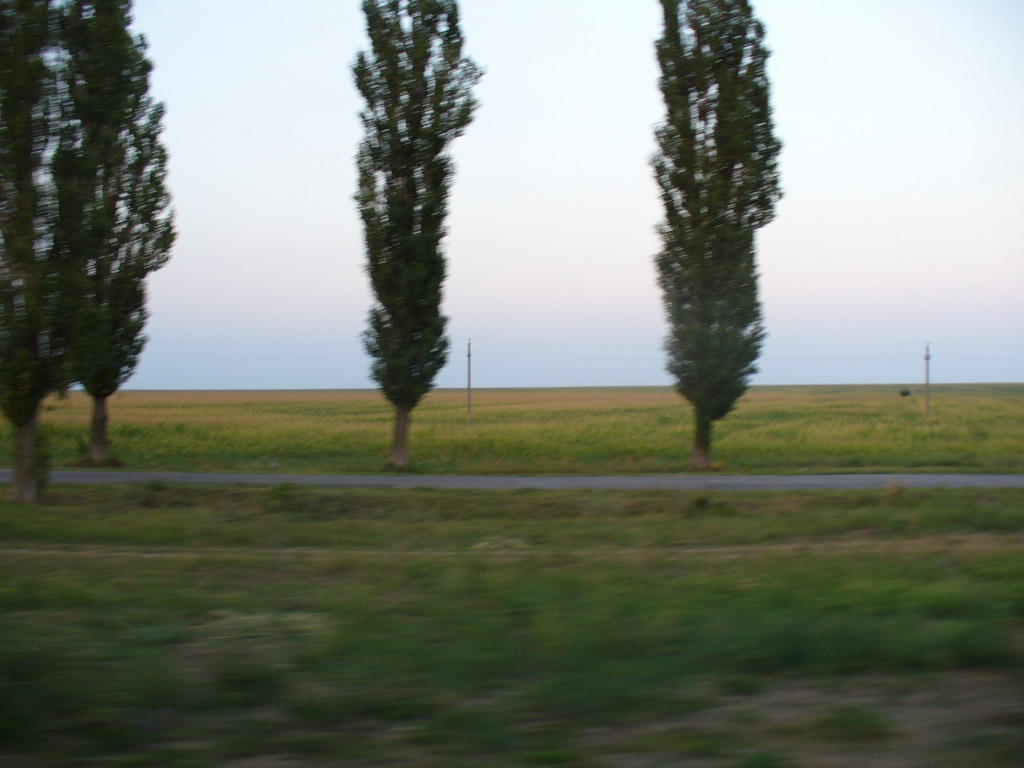
Scenery near Țăndărei

Ialomița County has a total area of 4,453 km^{2} (1,719 sq mi). The county is situated in the Bărăgan Plain. The area is flat crossed by small rivers with small but deep valleys.

Its eastern border is on the Danube. The Ialomița River crosses the county from West to East about the middle. The Danube is split around the Ialomița Pond into the Old Danube branch and the Borcea branch.

Until 1940 (in the western part) and 1967 (in the eastern part) the county/plain was home of the great bustard (dropie in Romanian), with large populations of this bird. The birds disappeared because of the massive village buildout and hunting them for food.

=== Climate ===
The climate of Ialomița County is temperate-continental, relatively homogeneous throughout its territory as a result of the accentuated uniformity of the relief, but with a pronounced degree of continentality, which causes great contrasts between summer and winter (the average annual thermal amplitude is 25.1°C, and the maximum amplitude has exceeded 70°C). The climate regime is characterized by very hot, sometimes drought-prone summers and cold winters, often marked by strong blizzards.

The multi-annual average values of air temperature record a slight differentiation between the northwestern part of Ialomița County (10.3°C, at Armăşeşti) and the southeastern part (11.1°C, at Feteşti), where a specific topoclimate of the Danube Floodplain is individualized (warmer summers and milder winters than in the rest of the plain). The absolute maximum temperature (44.0°C) was recorded at Amara (August 10, 1951), and the absolute minimum (–32.5°C) at Armăşeşti (January 25, 1942). The average annual amount of precipitation totals 550 mm in the western part of Ialomița County and 450 mm in the east, in the Danube Floodplain.

The territory of Ialomița County is under the influence of eastern (continental), western (oceanic), and southern (Mediterranean) air masses, which materialize through harsh winds from the northeast (the Crivăț), which cause blizzards in winter and drought in summer; dry winds from the southwest (the Austru), which often cause long periods of drought; and somewhat more humid winds from the southeast (the Băltăreţul), which blow mainly in the spring. The recorded average annual frequencies indicate a predominance of winds from the north and northeast (31.5%), followed by those from the southwest (17.8%), blowing at average annual speeds ranging between 2.0 and 5.4 m/s. The maximum speeds are recorded for winds blowing from the north and northeast, which reach 125 km/h during winter, being driven by the Siberian anticyclone.

=== Hydrography ===
The major (allochthonous) hydrographic network is represented by the lower course of the Ialomiţa River, which crosses the county medially from West to East over a distance of 212 km, and by the lower course of the Danube, which delimits Ialomiţa County to the East. Within the territory of Ialomiţa, the Danube flows through its two branches (Borcea to the West and the Danube to the East), which enclose the Balta Ialomiţei (Ialomiţa Pond/Marsh) between them, reuniting into a single course in the area of Giurgeni. The allochthonous network also includes several small sectors of the lower courses of the Prahova and Sărata rivers (left-bank tributaries of the Ialomiţa) and the upper course of the Mostiştea. The minor (autochthonous) hydrographic network is almost nonexistent, represented only by the Strachina and Fundata rivers. This results in a very low drainage density (0,1 km/km²) and a strong endorheic character (internal drainage) of the Ialomiţa territory. This endorheic character of the Romanian Plain within the county is mitigated by the Ialomiţa River – which could be nicknamed the "Nile of the Bărăgan" – whose average multi-annual discharge increases from 35,4 m³/s at Coşereni (in the west) to 40 m³/s at its mouth.

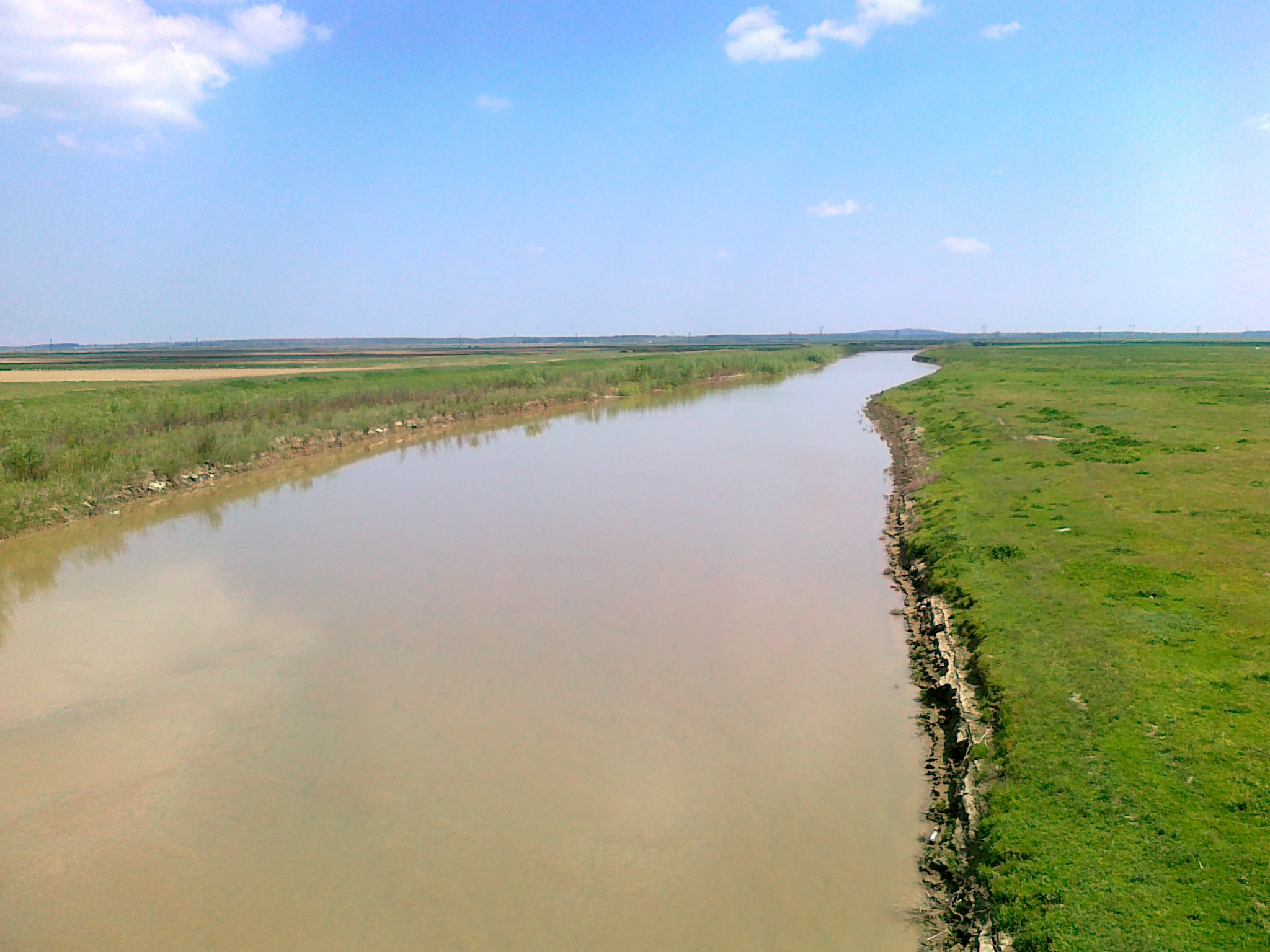
Ialomița River crossing the DN2A

==== Lakes and reservoirs ====
- Natural Lakes: These include fluvial limans (Strachina, Fundata, Perieţi/Şchiauca, Rogoz, Sărăţuica, Munteni-Buzău, Iezeru, Ograda, Amara, etc.) located on the left bank of the Ialomiţa; floodplain lakes (Coşcovata in the Danube floodplain; Bentu, Piersica, Batalu, Marsilieni, etc., in the Ialomiţa floodplain); and oxbow/riverbed lakes (Bentu-Lăteni, Bentul Stânii, etc., located in Balta Ialomiţei).
- Artificial Lakes: Created along valleys for fish farming, irrigation, and other purposes (Dridu, Reviga, Sineşti, Moviliţa, Valea Lată, etc.).

The waters of the Ialomiţa, Borcea, and the freshwater lakes have facilitated the creation of vast networks of main canals (Movila–Ştefan cel Mare–Borcea; Sudiţi–Perişoru–Jegălia; Ciulniţa–Dragalina–Călăraşi; Cosâmbeşti–Sudiţi–Săveni, etc.). These extend into Călăraşi County and assist in the irrigation of extensive agricultural areas, transforming the Bărăgan into the most fertile plain in the country.

=== Vegetation ===
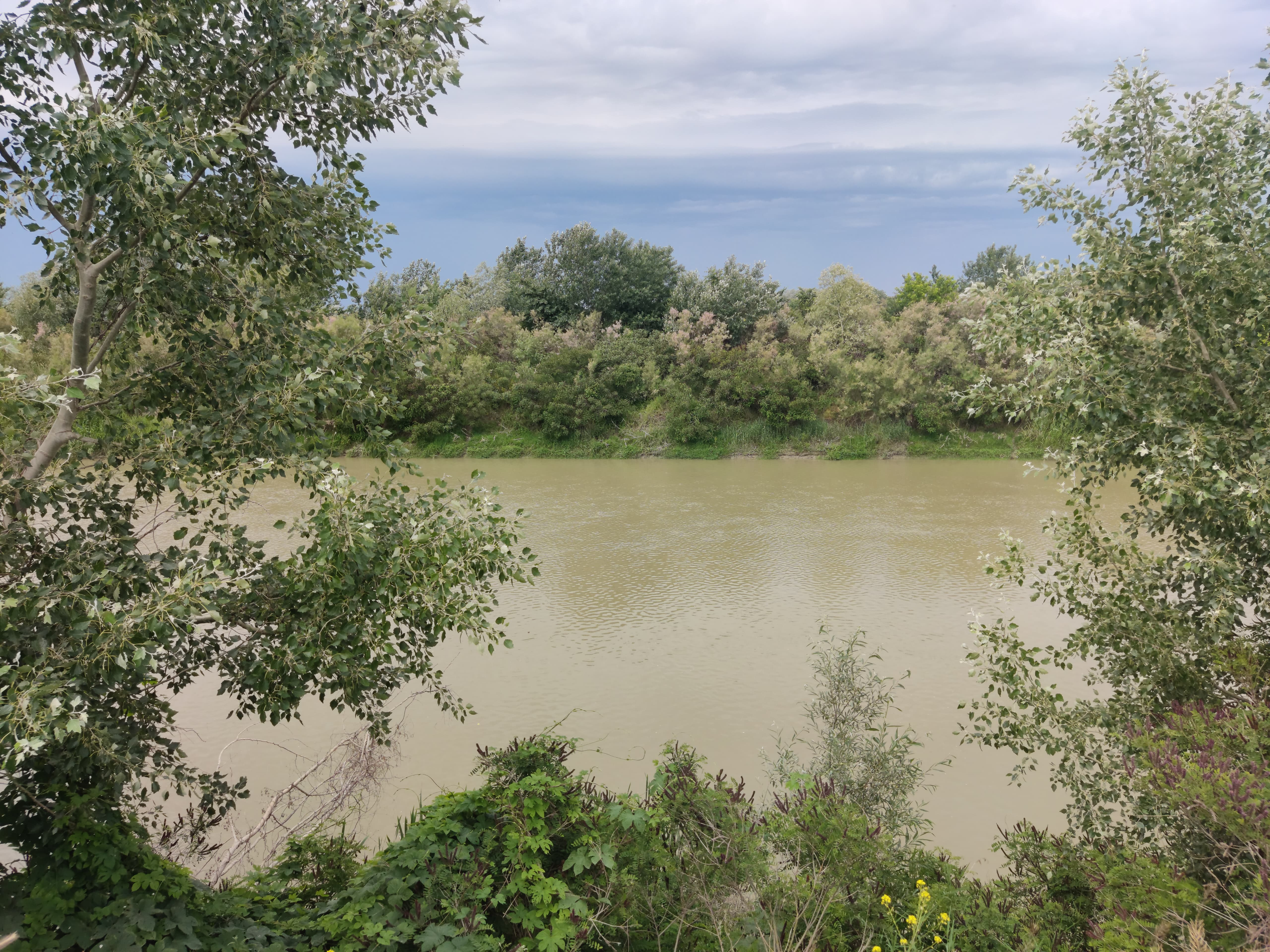
Vegetation in Orboești

The natural vegetation belongs, for the most part, to the steppe and forest-steppe zones. The steppe zone, which occupies 2/3 of the territory and within which the natural vegetation has been almost entirely replaced by agricultural crops, is characterized by patches of secondary, steppe meadows, made up of fescue (Festuca valesiaca), bulbous bluegrass (Poa bulbosa), crested wheatgrass (Agropyron cristatum), yellow bluestem (Andropogon ischaemum), common knotgrass (Polygonum aviculare), wild amaranth (Amaranthus retroflexus), nodding thistle (Carduus nutans) etc. The typical forest-steppe landscape, in which groves alternate with meadows, has diminished greatly, being replaced by the agricultural one. In isolation, a few clusters of forest have remained in which the grey oak (Quercus pedunculiflora) predominates. In some forests, alongside the grey oak, elements of southern origin develop, including the downy oak (Quercus pubescens), manna ash (Fraxinus ornus) and bushes of common privet (Ligustrum vulgare), Mahaleb cherry (Prunus mahaleb) etc. The azonal, floodplain vegetation includes, in most cases, groves of poplar and willow, and in places mixed broadleaf forests in which the oak (Quercus robur), Tatar maple (Acer tataricum), field elm (Ulmus campestre), ash (Fraxinus excelsior) etc., predominate. The intrazonal vegetation has a great extension, developing on consolidated sands – typical psammophilic vegetation, made up of puncture vine (Tribulus terrestris), bur grass (Tragus racemosus), stork's bill (Erodium neilreichi), dwarf everlast (Helichrysum arenarium) etc., and on salt-affected lands, common glasswort (Salicornia herbacea), sea lavender (Statice gmelini), sea wormwood (Artemisia maritima) etc. The aquatic and marsh vegetation includes the white and yellow water lily (Nymphaea alba and Nuphar luteum), water chestnut (Trapa natans), greater pond sedge (Carex riparia), arrowhead (Sagittaria sagittifolia) etc.

=== Fauna ===
The fauna is characteristic of the steppe and forest-steppe zones, with typical elements adapted to agrobiocenoses, among which stand out the hare, the ground squirrel, the steppe polecat, the hamster, the field mouse, the field rat, the blind mole-rat, the large whip snake, the quail, the partridge, the lark, the fox, the wolf, the badger, the meadow lizard, the European green lizard, the little bustard (Ottis tetrax orientalis), the pallid harrier (Circus macrourus), the long-legged buzzard (Buteo rufinis), the steppe owl, as well as numerous insects (crickets, bush-crickets, locusts, praying mantises, dragonflies, butterflies, etc.). The fauna of the floodplain areas and lakes is also rich and varied, being represented by the otter (Lutra lutra), the raccoon dog (Nyctereutes procynoides), the muskrat (Ondatra zibethica), grebes, herons, swans, storks, coots, wild ducks and geese, woodcocks, sandpipers, rails, ospreys, griffon vultures, the European pond turtle (Emys orbicularis), the dice snake (Natrix tessellata), frogs, etc. The ichthyofauna is represented by carp, sterlet, stellate sturgeon, pike, roach, common rudd, common nase, barbel, common bleak, Prussian carp, bream, Vimba bream, zander, etc. In many forests of Ialomiţa, pheasants and roe deer have been colonized, which are of great hunting interest.

=== Neighbours ===
- Constanța County in the east.
- Ilfov County in the west.
- Brăila County, Buzău County, and Prahova County in the north.
- Călărași County in the south.

== Economy ==
Agriculture is the main occupation in the county. Industry is almost entirely concentrated in the city of Slobozia.

The predominant industries in the county are:

- Food industry;
- Textile industry;
- Mechanical components industry.

== Tourism ==
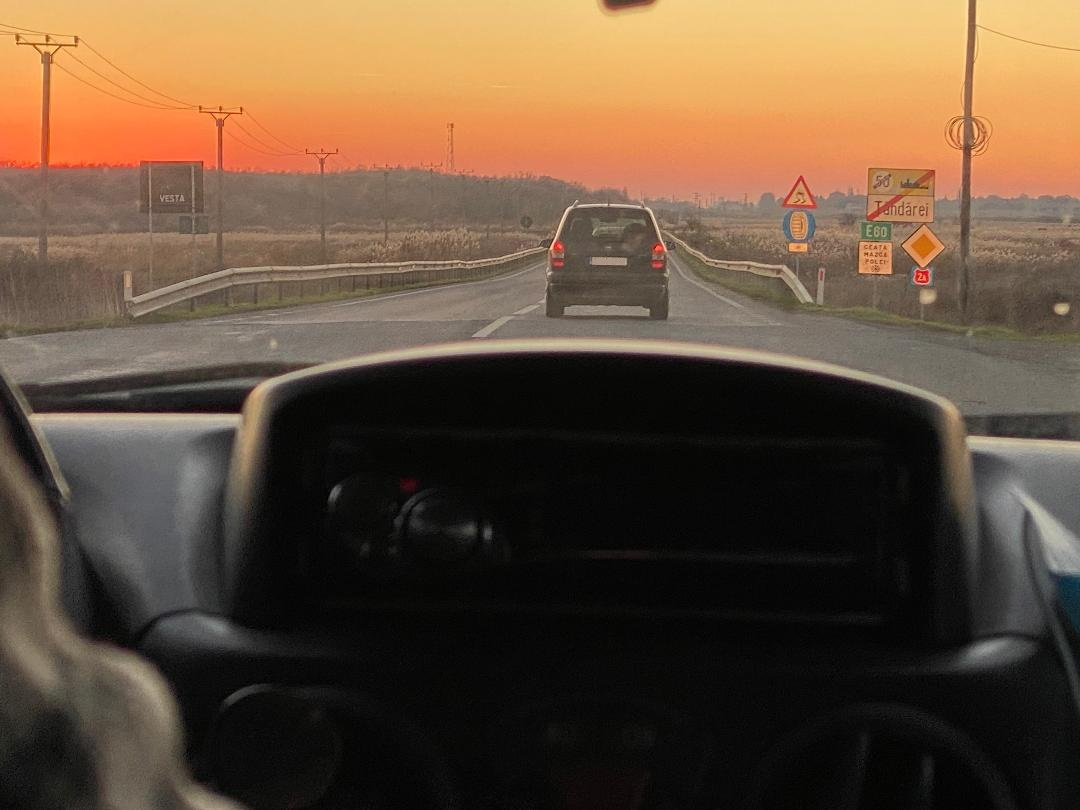
Sunset in Țăndărei

The main tourist destinations are:

- The city of Slobozia.

== Politics ==
The Ialomița County Council, renewed at the 2024 local elections, consists of 30 councilors, with the following party composition:

Party	Seats	Current County Council
Social Democratic Party (PSD)	17	
National Liberal Party (PNL)	8	
Alliance for the Union of Romanians (AUR)	5	

== Administrative divisions ==
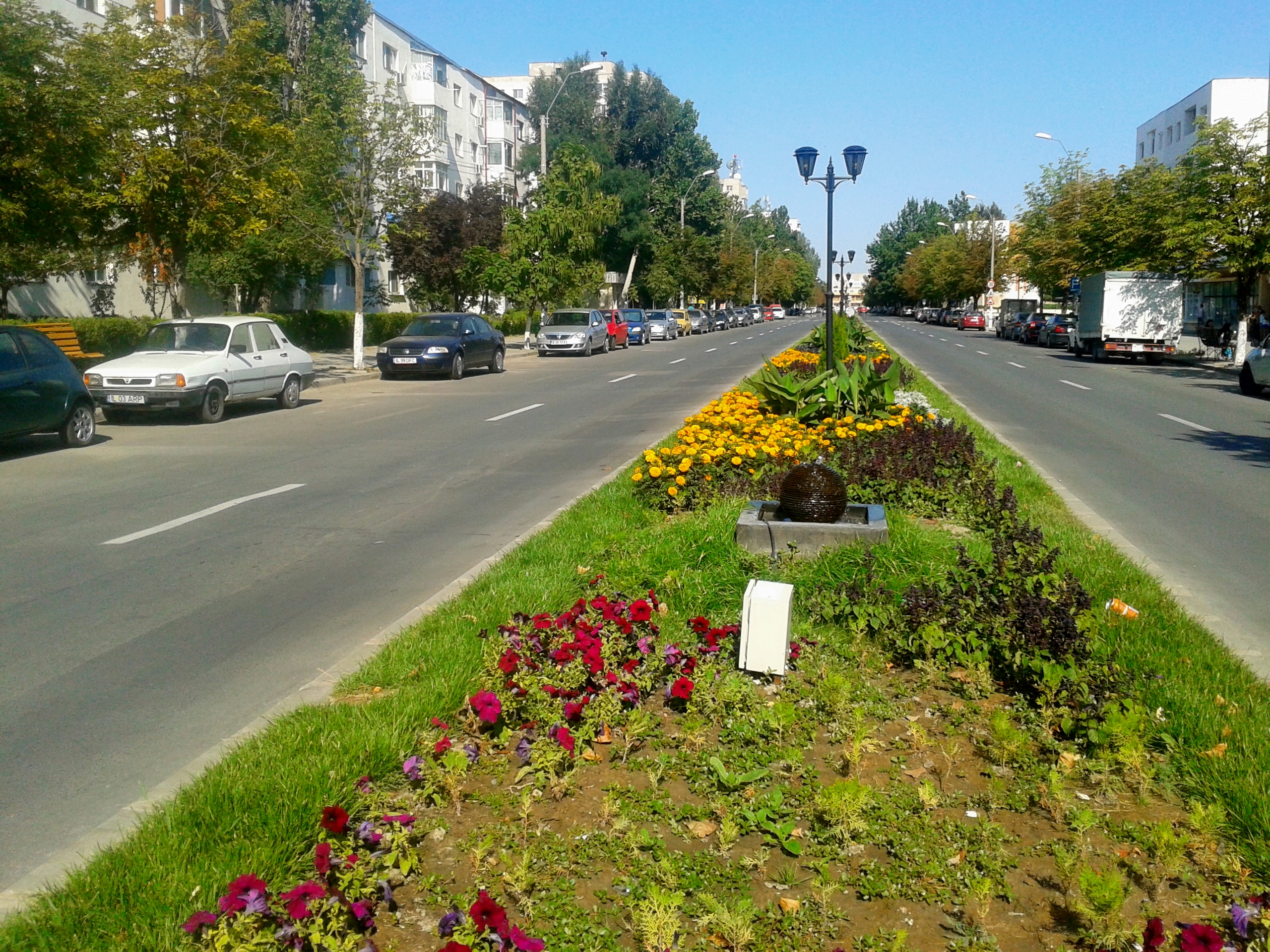
Slobozia

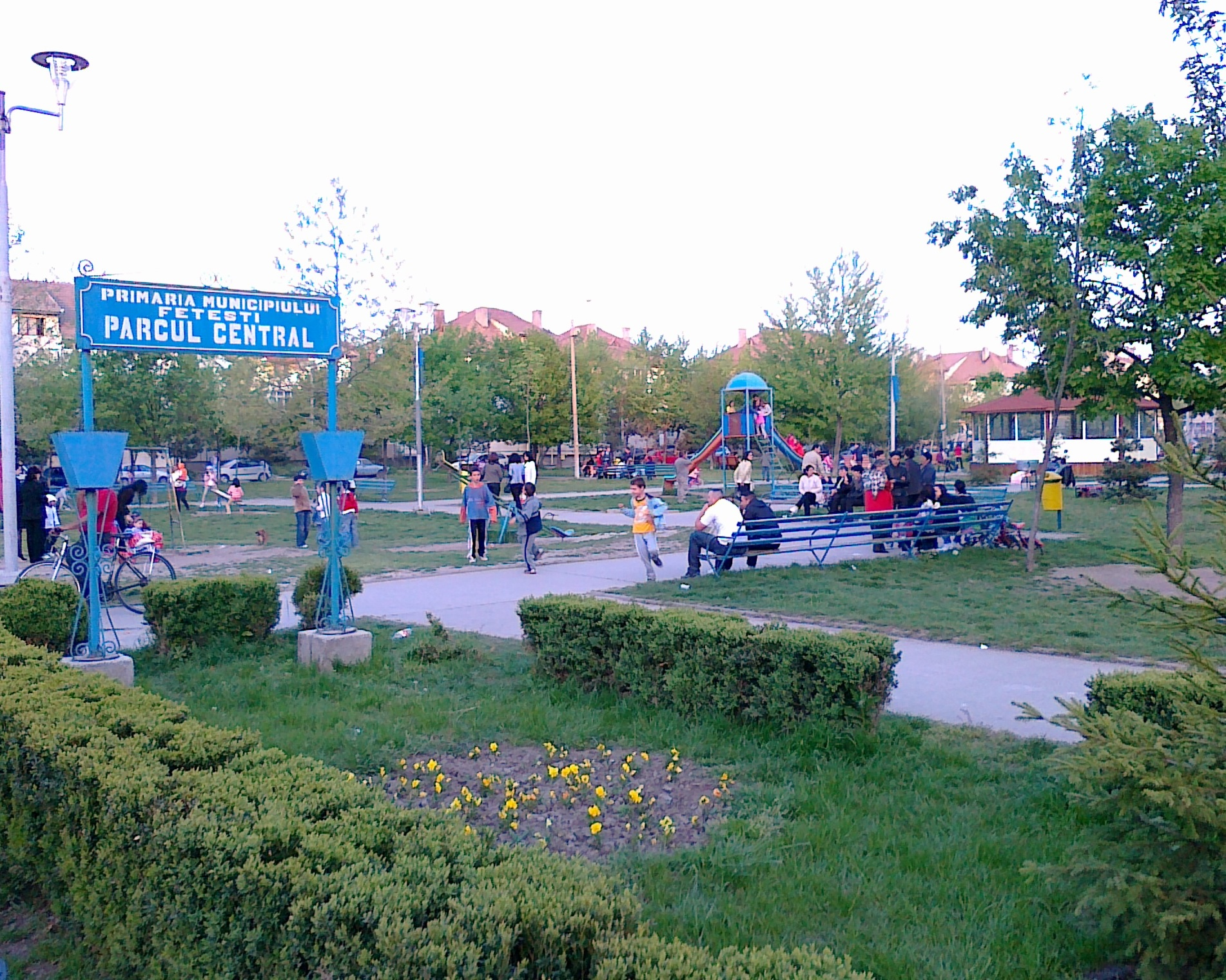
The central park of Fetești

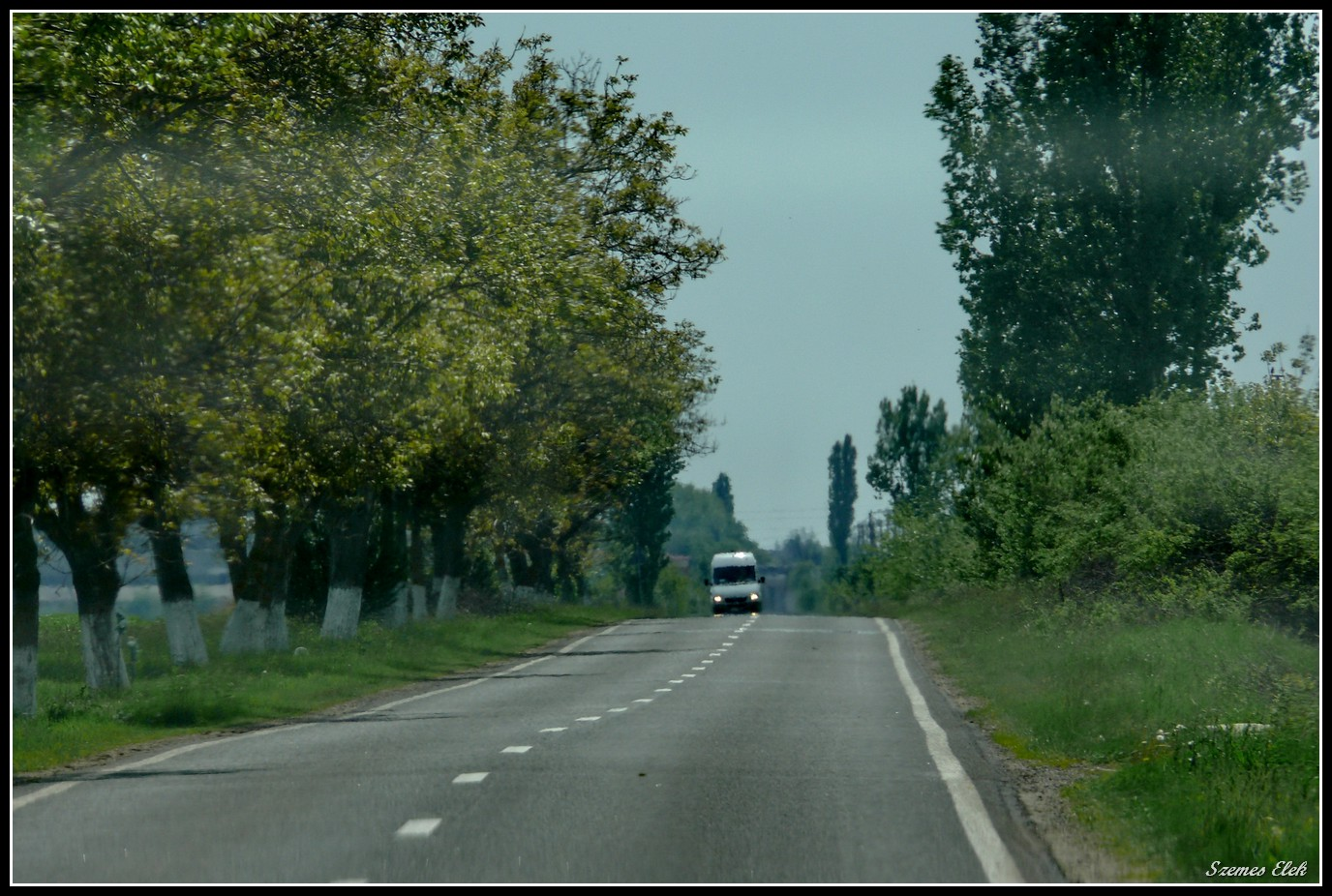
Road near Urziceni

Ialomița County has 3 municipalities, 4 towns and 59 communes.

- Municipalities
  - Fetești - population: 27,122 (as of 2011)
  - Slobozia - capital city; population: 43,061 (as of 2011)
  - Urziceni - population: 14,053 (as of 2011)
- Towns
  - Amara
  - Căzănești
  - Fierbinți-Târg
  - Țăndărei
- Communes
  - Adâncata
  - Albești
  - Alexeni
  - Andrășești
  - Armășești
  - Axintele
  - Balaciu
  - Bărcănești
  - Bărbulești
  - Borănești
  - Bordușani
  - Bucu
  - Buești
  - Ciocârlia
  - Ciochina
  - Ciulnița
  - Cocora
  - Colelia
  - Cosâmbești
  - Coșereni
  - Drăgoești
  - Dridu
  - Făcăeni
  - Gârbovi
  - Gheorghe Doja
  - Gheorghe Lazăr
  - Giurgeni
  - Grindu
  - Grivița
  - Gura Ialomiței
  - Ion Roată
  - Jilavele
  - Maia
  - Manasia
  - Mărculești
  - Mihail Kogălniceanu
  - Miloșești
  - Moldoveni
  - Movila
  - Movilița
  - Munteni-Buzău
  - Ograda
  - Perieți
  - Platonești
  - Rădulești
  - Reviga
  - Roșiori
  - Sălcioara
  - Sărățeni
  - Săveni
  - Scânteia
  - Sfântu Gheorghe
  - Sinești
  - Stelnica
  - Sudiți
  - Traian
  - Valea Ciorii
  - Valea Măcrișului
  - Vlădeni

== Historical county ==
Județul Ialomița
- County (Județ)
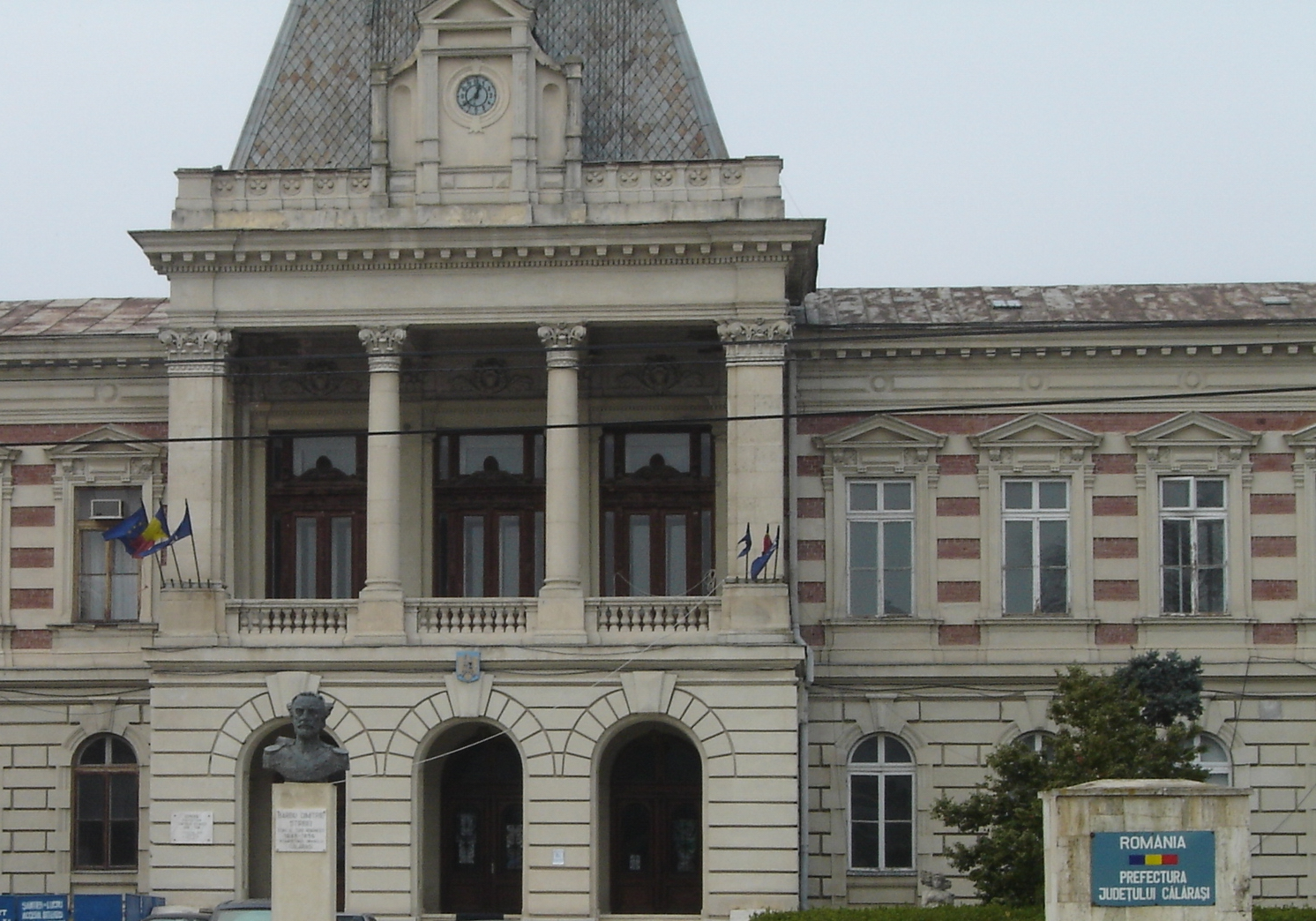
- The Ialomița County prefecture building from the interwar period, now the prefecture building of Călărași County.

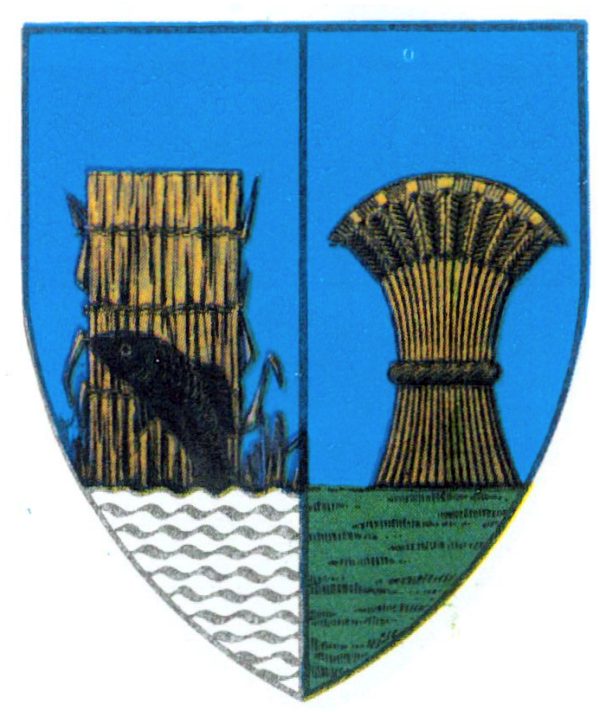
- Coat of arms

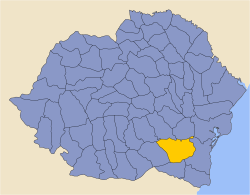
- Country: Romania
- Historic region: Muntenia
- Capital city (Reședință de județ): Călărași

Area
  - Total: 7,095 km^{2} (2,739 sq mi)

Population (1930)
  - Total: 293,352
  - Density: 41.35/km^{2} (107.1/sq mi)
- Time zone: UTC+2 (EET)
  - Summer (DST): UTC+3 (EEST)

Historically, the county was located in the southeastern part of Greater Romania, in the southeastern part of the historical region of Muntenia. The county comprised a large part of the current Ialomița County and of today's Călărași County. It was bordered to the west by Ilfov County, to the north by the counties of Prahova, Buzău and Brăila, to the east by Constanța County, and in the south by Durostor County.

With an area of 7,095 square kilometres (2,739 sq mi), Ialomița County was one of the largest counties of Greater Romania.

=== Administration ===
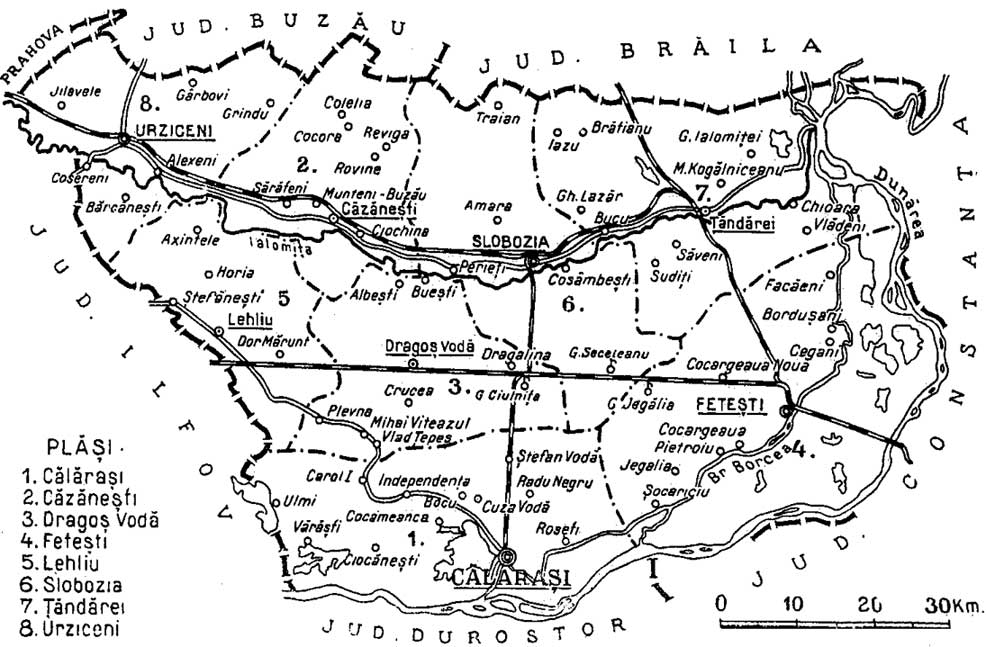
Map of Ialomița County as constituted in 1938.

The county was originally divided administratively into five districts (plăși):

1. Plasa Călărași, headquartered at Călărași
2. Plasa Lehliu, headquartered at Lehliu
3. Plasa Slobozia, headquartered at Slobozia
4. Plasa Țăndărei, headquartered at Țăndărei
5. Plasa Urziceni, headquartered at Urziceni

Subsequently, three new districts were added:

6. Plasa Căzănești, headquartered at Căzănești
7. Plasa Dragoș Vodă, headquartered at Dragoș Vodă
8. Plasa Fetești, headquartered at Fetești

=== Population ===
According to the 1930 census data, the county population was 293,352 inhabitants, ethnically divided as follows: 96.6% Romanians, 2.5% Romanies, 0.2% Jews, as well as other minorities. From the religious point of view, the population was 99.3% Eastern Orthodox, 0.2% Jewish, 0.1% Roman Catholic, as well as other minorities.

==== Urban population ====
In 1930, the county's urban population was 34,260 inhabitants, comprising 90.2% Romanians, 6.0% Romnanies, 1.3% Jews, as well as other minorities. From the religious point of view, the urban population was composed of 97.4% Eastern Orthodox, 1.4% Jewish, 0.5% Roman Catholic, as well as other minorities.
