= Mihail Kogălniceanu, Ialomița =

Mihail Kogălniceanu
- Commune
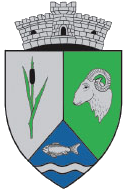
- Coat of arms

- Location in Ialomița County

- Location in Romania
- Coordinates: 44°41′N 27°42′E
- Country: Romania
- County: Ialomița

Government
  - Mayor (2024–2028): Mihăiță Barbu (PSD)
- Area: 86.27 km^{2} (33.31 sq mi)
- Elevation: 20 m (66 ft)
- Population (2021-12-01): 2,755
  - Density: 31.93/km^{2} (82.71/sq mi)
- Time zone: UTC+02:00 (EET)
  - Summer (DST): UTC+03:00 (EEST)
- Postal code: 927165
- Area code: +(40) 243
- Vehicle reg.: IL
- Website: www.primariamihailkogalniceanu.ro

Mihail Kogălniceanu (Romanian pronunciation: [mihaˈil koɡəlniˈtʃe̯anu]) is a commune located in Ialomița County, Muntenia, Romania. It is composed of two villages, Hagieni and Mihail Kogălniceanu. The village was named after 19th century Romanian politician Mihail Kogălniceanu.

Historical population
Year	Pop.	±%
2002	3,389	—
2011	3,000	−11.5%
2021	2,755	−8.2%
Source: Census data
