= Căzănești =

- Town
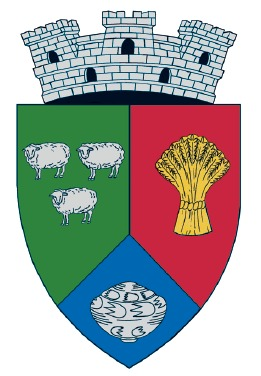
- Coat of arms

- Location in Ialomița County

- Location in Romania
- Coordinates: 44.6192°N 27.01°E
- Country: Romania
- County: Ialomița

Government
  - Mayor (2024–2028): Rodica-Viorica Andronache (PSD)
- Area: 54.29 km^{2} (20.96 sq mi)
- Elevation: 40 m (130 ft)
- Population (2021-12-01): 2,938
  - Density: 54.12/km^{2} (140.2/sq mi)
- Time zone: UTC+02:00 (EET)
  - Summer (DST): UTC+03:00 (EEST)
- Postal code: 927065
- Area code: (+40) 02 43
- Vehicle reg.: IL
- Website: www.primariacazanestiil.ro

Căzănești is a town in Ialomița County, Muntenia, Romania. It is situated on the left bank of the river Ialomița, 30 km (19 mi) west of the county seat, Slobozia. The town is crossed by the national road DN2A (part of European route E60), which connects Urziceni with Constanța.

Historical population
Year	Pop.	±%
2002	3,641	—
2011	3,206	−11.9%
2021	2,938	−8.4%
Source: Census data

== Natives ==
- Cornel Cernea (born 1976), coach and footballer
