= Drăgoești, Ialomița =

Drăgoești
- Commune
- Location in Ialomița County

- Location in Romania
- Coordinates: 44°34′N 26°33′E
- Country: Romania
- County: Ialomița

Government
  - Mayor (2024–2028): Mihail Gheorghe (PSD)
- Area: 47.47 km^{2} (18.33 sq mi)
- Elevation: 66 m (217 ft)
- Population (2021-12-01): 1,069
  - Density: 22.52/km^{2} (58.33/sq mi)
- Time zone: UTC+02:00 (EET)
  - Summer (DST): UTC+03:00 (EEST)
- Postal code: 927100
- Area code: +(40) 243
- Vehicle reg.: IL
- Website: primariadragoesti-ialomita.ro

Drăgoești is a commune located in Ialomița County, Muntenia, Romania. It is composed of five villages: Chiroiu-Pământeni, Chiroiu-Satu Nou, Chiroiu-Ungureni, Drăgoești, and Valea Bisericii.

Historical population
Year	Pop.	±%
1899	1,996	—
1925	1,875	−6.1%
2002	1,161	−38.1%
2011	1,082	−6.8%
2021	1,069	−1.2%
Source: Census data
