= Movila, Ialomița =

Movila
- Commune
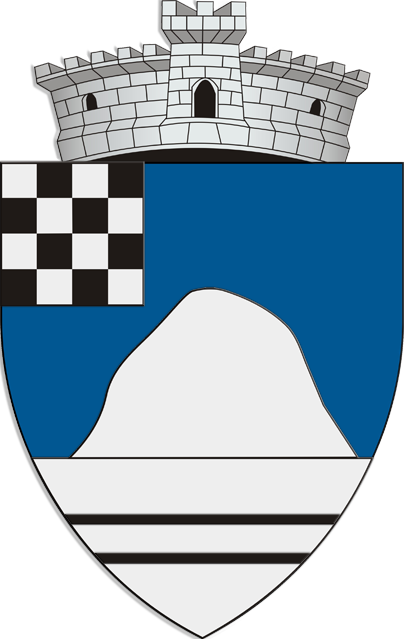
- Coat of arms

- Location in Ialomița County

- Location in Romania
- Coordinates: 44.55°N 27.7°E
- Country: Romania
- County: Ialomița

Government
  - Mayor (2020–2024): Valeriu Mihai (PSD)
- Area: 75.39 km^{2} (29.11 sq mi)
- Elevation: 68 m (223 ft)
- Population (2021-12-01): 1,605
  - Density: 21.29/km^{2} (55.14/sq mi)
- Time zone: UTC+02:00 (EET)
  - Summer (DST): UTC+03:00 (EEST)
- Postal code: 927175
- Area code: +(40) 243
- Vehicle reg.: IL
- Website: www.primariamovila.ro

Movila is a commune located in Ialomița County, Muntenia, Romania. It is composed of a single village, Movila.

== Location ==
The commune lies in the Bărăgan Plain, at an altitude of 68 m (223 ft). It is located in the southeastern part of Ialomița County, 30 km (19 mi) east of the county seat, Slobozia, on the border with Călărași County.

Movila is crossed by county road DJ212, which connects it with Fetești-Gară, 16 kilometres (10 mi) to the south, and to Țăndărei, about the same distance to the north.

Historical population
Year	Pop.	±%
2002	2,221	—
2011	1,842	−17.1%
2021	1,605	−12.9%
Source: Census data
