= Sfântu Gheorghe, Ialomița =

Sfântu Gheorghe
- Commune
- Location in Ialomița County

- Location in Romania
- Coordinates: 44°39′N 26°52′E
- Country: Romania
- County: Ialomița

Government
  - Mayor (2024–2028): Petru-Mădălin Teculescu (PNL)
- Area: 71.27 km^{2} (27.52 sq mi)
- Elevation: 43 m (141 ft)
- Population (2021-12-01): 1,841
  - Density: 25.83/km^{2} (66.90/sq mi)
- Time zone: UTC+02:00 (EET)
  - Summer (DST): UTC+03:00 (EEST)
- Postal code: 927215
- Area code: +(40) 243
- Vehicle reg.: IL
- Website: www.sfintugheorghe.ro

Sfântu Gheorghe is a commune located in Ialomița County, Muntenia, Romania. It is composed of three villages: Butoiu, Malu, and Sfântu Gheorghe.

Historical population
Year	Pop.	±%
1899	1,092	—
1925	3,156	+189.0%
2002	2,180	−30.9%
2011	2,038	−6.5%
2021	1,841	−9.7%
Source: Census data
