= Valea Măcrișului =

- Commune
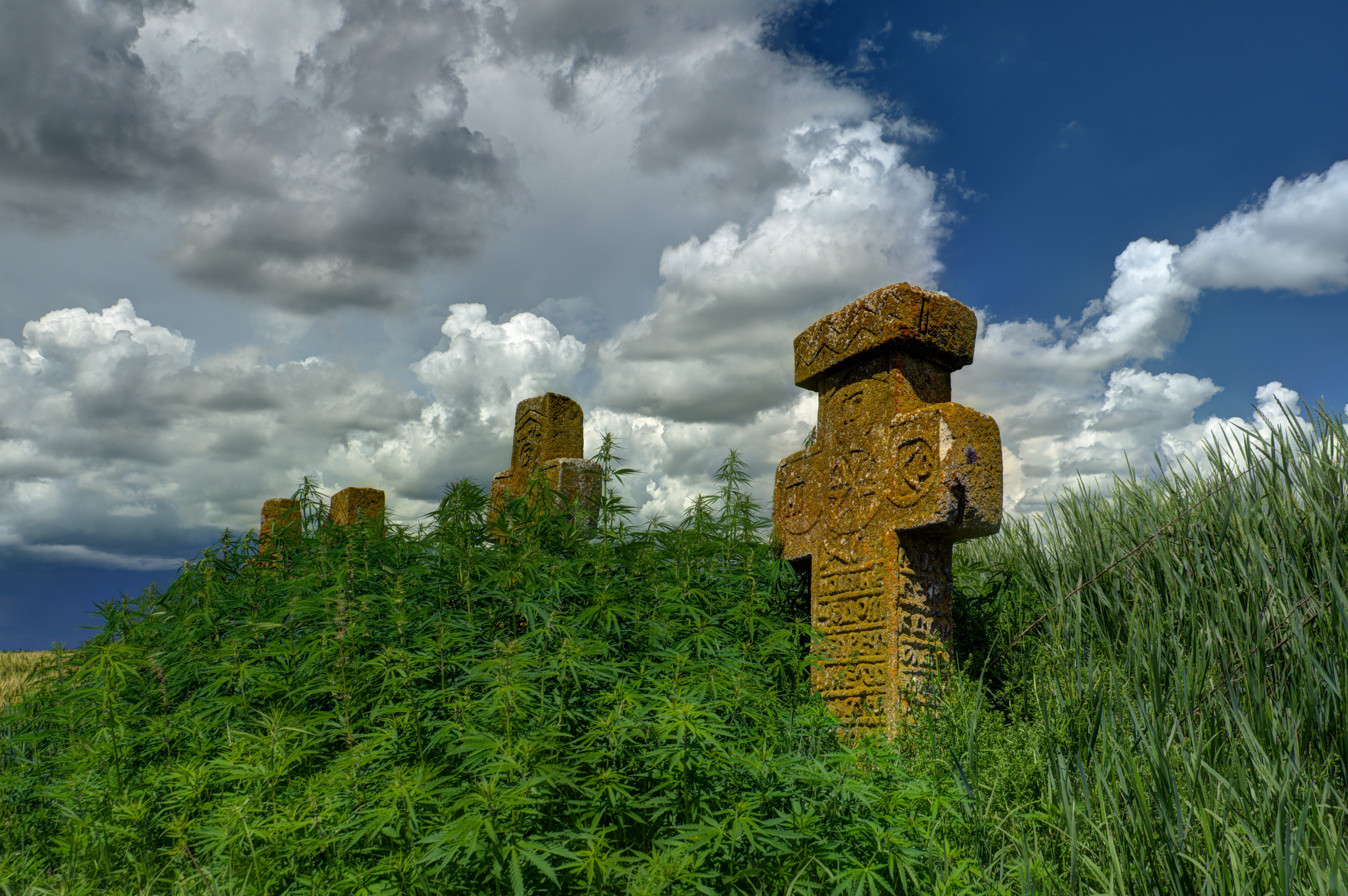
- "Four Brothers" stone crosses

- Location in Ialomița County

- Location in Romania
- Coordinates: 44°45′N 26°50′E
- Country: Romania
- County: Ialomița

Government
  - Mayor (2024–2028): Mihail Bobeș (PSD)
- Area: 50 km^{2} (19 sq mi)
- Elevation: 60 m (200 ft)
- Population (2021-12-01): 1,554
  - Density: 31/km^{2} (80/sq mi)
- Time zone: UTC+02:00 (EET)
  - Summer (DST): UTC+03:00 (EEST)
- Postal code: 927240
- Area code: +(40) 243
- Vehicle reg.: IL
- Website: www.valeamacrisului.ro

Valea Măcrișului is a commune located in Ialomița County, Muntenia, Romania. It is composed of two villages, Grindași and Valea Măcrișului.

Historical population
Year	Pop.	±%
2002	2,111	—
2011	1,892	−10.4%
2021	1,554	−17.9%
Source: Census data
