= Vulcana (disambiguation) =

Vulcana was a Welsh strongwoman.

Vulcana may also refer to:

- Vulcana (river), a tributary of the Ialomița in Romania
- Vulcana-Băi, a commune in Dâmbovița County, Romania
- Vulcana-Pandele, a commune in Dâmbovița County, Romania
- Vulcana de Sus, a village in the commune Vulcana-Băi, Dâmbovița County, Romania

== See also ==
- Vulcanal
