= Fundata (disambiguation) =

Fundata may refer to the following places in Romania:

- Fundata, a commune in Brașov County
- Fundata, a village in the commune Lopătari, Buzău County
- Fundata, a village in the commune Perieți, Ialomița County
- Fundáta, the Hungarian name for the village Valea in the commune Urmeniș, Bistrița-Năsăud County
- Fundata (river), a tributary of the Ialomița in Ialomița County
