= Bucșani =

Bucșani may refer to several places in Romania:

- Bucșani, Dâmbovița, a commune in Dâmbovița County
- Bucșani, Giurgiu, a commune in Giurgiu County
- Bucșani, a village in Ionești Commune, Vâlcea County

== See also ==
- Bucșa (disambiguation)
- Bucșă - family name from iron bolt on a cartwheel, frequently spelled Bucşa
