= Lucăcilă River =

Lucăcilă River may refer to:

- Lucăcilă, a tributary of the Brătei in Dâmbovița County
- Lucăcilă, a tributary of the Ialomița in Dâmbovița County
- Vâlcelul Lucăcilă, a tributary of the Brătei in Dâmbovița County

== See also ==
- Lucăceni (disambiguation)
- Lucăcești (disambiguation)
