= Rovine =

Rovine (Serbian Cyrillic: Ровине) may refer to:

- Battle of Rovine (1395)
- Rovine, Gradiška, in Bosnia and Herzegovina
- Rovine, Ivanjica, in Serbia
- Rovine, a village in the municipality Craiova in Romania
- Rovine, a village in the commune Reviga in Romania
- Rovine, a tributary of the Bistra in Bihor County, Romania
