= Țâța =

River in Romania

- Location within Romania

Location
- Country: Romania
- Counties: Dâmbovița County
- Villages: Dealu Frumos, Dealu Mare

Physical characteristics
- Mouth: Ialomița
  - location: Dealu Mare
  - coordinates: 45.1613°N 25.4537°E
- Length: 16 km (9.9 mi)
- Basin size: 17 km^{2} (6.6 sq mi)

Basin features
- Progression: Ialomița→ Danube→ Black Sea

The Țâța is a right tributary of the river Ialomița in Romania. It flows into the Ialomița in Dealu Mare. Its length is 16 km (9.9 mi) and its basin size is 17 km^{2} (6.6 sq mi).
