= Racovița =

Racovița may refer to several places in Romania:

- Racovița, Brăila, a commune in Brăila County
- Racovița, Sibiu, a commune in Sibiu County
- Racovița, Timiș, a commune in Timiș County
- Racovița, Vâlcea, a commune in Vâlcea County
- Racovița, a village in Bucșani Commune, Dâmbovița County
- Racovița, a village in Braloștița Commune, Dolj County
- Racovița, a village in Polovragi Commune, Gorj County
- Racovița, a village in Voineasa Commune, Olt County
- Racovița, a village in Gârceni Commune, Vaslui County
- Racovița, a village in Budești Commune, Vâlcea County
- Racovița, a district in the town of Mioveni, Argeș County
- Racovița, a tributary of the Avrig in Sibiu County
- Racovița (Făgăraș), a tributary of the Olt in Brașov County
- Racovița (Ialomița), a tributary of the Ialomița in Dâmbovița County
- Racovița, a tributary of the Olt in Sibiu County

== See also ==
- Racoviță
- Racova (disambiguation)
