= Glodeni (disambiguation) =

Glodeni may refer to several places in Romania:

- Glodeni, a commune in Dâmbovița County
- Glodeni, a commune in Mureș County
- Glodeni, a village in Pucioasa town, Dâmbovița County
- Glodeni, a village in Bălănești Commune, Gorj County
- Glodeni, a village in Negrești town, Vaslui County

and in Moldova:

- Glodeni, a city and the seat of Glodeni district
