= Pâscov =

- Location within Romania

Location
- Country: Romania
- Counties: Dâmbovița County
- Villages: Bucșani

Physical characteristics
- Mouth: Ialomița
  - coordinates: 44.7948°N 25.7630°E
- Length: 38 km (24 mi)
- Basin size: 74 km^{2} (29 sq mi)

Basin features
- Progression: Ialomița→ Danube→ Black Sea

The Pâscov is a left tributary of the river Ialomița in Romania. It discharges into Ialomița in Gheboaia. Its length is 38 km (24 mi) and its basin size is 74 km^{2} (29 sq mi).
