= Ciocănari =

Ciocănari may refer to several villages in Romania:

- Ciocănari, a village in Niculești Commune, Dâmbovița County
- Ciocănari, a village in Măciuca Commune, Vâlcea County
