= Ialomicioara River =

Ialomicioara River may refer to:

- Ialomicioara (left tributary), a left tributary of the Ialomița near Moroeni, Romania
- Ialomicioara (right tributary), a right tributary of the Ialomița near Fieni, Romania

== See also ==
- Ialomița (disambiguation)
