= Slănic (Ialomița) =

Slănic Slănic de Gura Ocniței
- Location within Romania

Location
- Country: Romania
- Counties: Dâmbovița County
- Villages: Ocnița, Gura Ocniței, Săcueni

Physical characteristics
- Mouth: Ialomița
  - location: Comișani
  - coordinates: 44.8834°N 25.6007°E
- Length: 30 km (19 mi)
- Basin size: 82 km^{2} (32 sq mi)

Basin features
- Progression: Ialomița→ Danube→ Black Sea
- Tributaries
  - left: Ocnița
  - right: Răzvădeanca
- River code: XI.1.11

The Slănic (sometimes referred to as Slănic de Gura Ocniței or Slănicul de Jos to distinguish it from other rivers named Slănic) is a left tributary of the river Ialomița in Romania. It discharges into the Ialomița in Comișani. Its length is 30 km (19 mi) and its basin size is 82 km^{2} (32 sq mi).
