= Hlinaia =

Hlinaia may refer to several places in Moldova:

- Hlinaia, Edineţ, a commune in Edineţ district
- Hlinaia, Grigoriopol, Transnistria, a commune in Grigoriopol sub-district, Transnistria
- Hlinaia, Slobozia, Transnistria, a commune in Slobozia sub-district, Transnistria
