= Slănic (disambiguation) =

Slănic may refer to several places in Romania:

- Slănic, a spa town in Prahova County
- Slănic-Moldova, a town in Bacău County
- Slănic, a village in Aninoasa commune, Argeș County
- Slănic (Bratia), a tributary of the Bratia in Argeș County
- Slănic (Buzău), a tributary of the Buzău in Buzău County
- Slănic (Ialomița), a tributary of the Ialomița in Dâmbovița County
- Slănic (Trotuș), a tributary of the Trotuș in Bacău County
- Slănic (Vărbilău), a tributary of the Vărbilău in Prahova County
- Slănic de Răzvad, a tributary of the Ialomița in Dâmbovița County
