= Slănic de Răzvad =

- Location within Romania

Location
- Country: Romania
- Counties: Dâmbovița County
- Villages: Glodeni, Gorgota, Răzvad

Physical characteristics
- Mouth: Ialomița
  - location: Nisipurile
  - coordinates: 44.9191°N 25.5336°E
- Length: 22 km (14 mi)
- Basin size: 47 km^{2} (18 sq mi)

Basin features
- Progression: Ialomița→ Danube→ Black Sea
- River code: XI.1.10

The Slănic de Răzvad (also: Slănicul de Sus or Slănic) is a left tributary of the river Ialomița in Romania. It flows into the Ialomița near Nisipurile. Its length is 22 km (14 mi) and its basin size is 47 km^{2} (18 sq mi).
