= Cotoroaia =

Cotoroaia may refer to several villages in Romania:

- Cotoroaia, a village in Cerțești Commune, Galaţi County
- Cotoroaia, a village in Voloiac Commune, Mehedinţi County

== See also ==
- Cotorca (disambiguation)
- Cotoru River (disambiguation)
