= Vulcana-Pandele =

- Commune
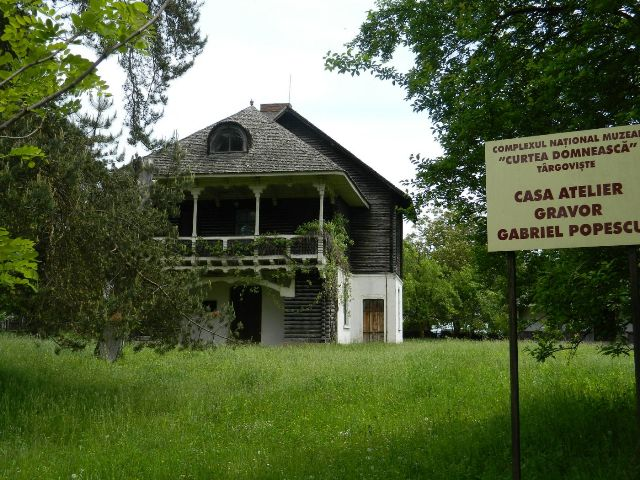
- Gabriel Popescu memorial house in Vulcana-Pandele

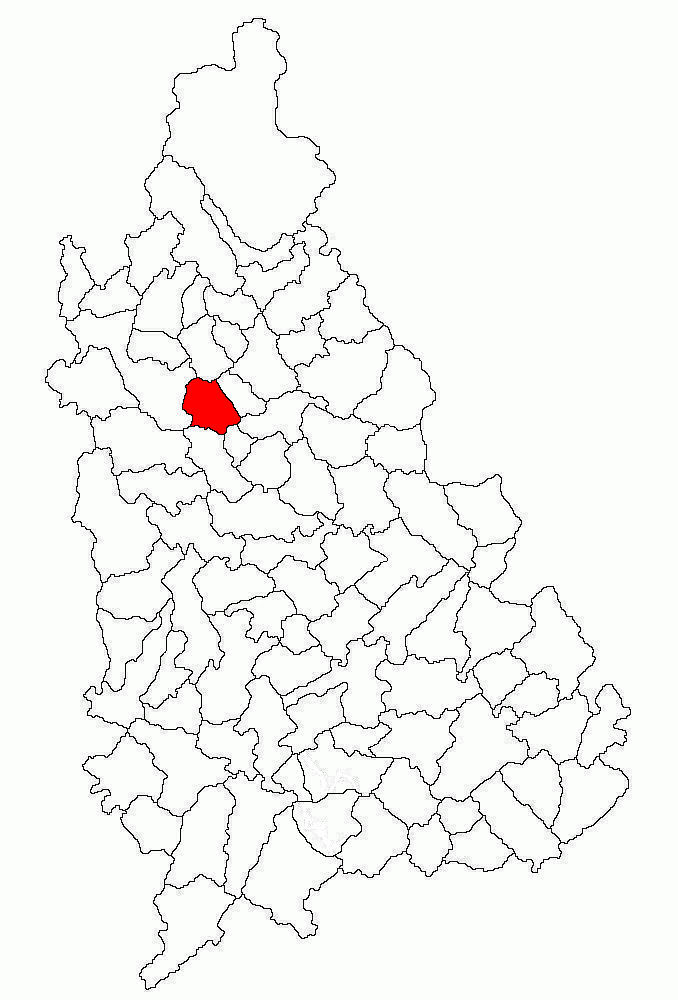
- Location in Dâmbovița County

- Location in Romania
- Coordinates: 45°2′N 25°23′E
- Country: Romania
- County: Dâmbovița

Government
  - Mayor (2020–2024): Vasile Radu (PSD)
- Area: 25.08 km^{2} (9.68 sq mi)
- Elevation: 348 m (1,142 ft)
- Population (2021-12-01): 4,683
  - Density: 186.7/km^{2} (483.6/sq mi)
- Time zone: UTC+02:00 (EET)
  - Summer (DST): UTC+03:00 (EEST)
- Postal code: 137540
- Area code: +(40) 245
- Vehicle reg.: DB
- Website: www.vulcanapandele.ro

Vulcana-Pandele is a commune in Dâmbovița County, Muntenia, Romania. It is composed of four villages: Gura Vulcanei, Lăculețe-Gară, Toculești, and Vulcana-Pandele.

The commune is situated in the southern foothills of the Făgăraș Mountains, at a mean altitude of 348 m (1,142 ft), on the banks of the Ialomița River and its right tributary, the Vulcana. It is located in the northern part of Dâmbovița County, about 8 km (5 mi) south of the town of Pucioasa, and 16 km (10 mi) north of Târgoviște, the county seat.

Vulcana-Pandele is crossed by national road DN71, which starts close to Bucharest, runs through Târgoviște, and ends in Sinaia, 50 km (31 mi) north of the commune. The county road DJJ712 branches off westwards, towards the Dâmbovița River valley, where it ends in DN72A. The Vulcana-Pandele train station serves the CFR Line 904, which connects Titu to Pietroșița (passing through Târgoviște).

Historical population
Year	Pop.	±%
2002	4,959	—
2011	5,134	+3.5%
2021	4,683	−8.8%
Source: Census data
