= Cotoru River =

Cotoru River may refer to:

- Cotoru, a tributary of the Jaleș in Gorj County, Romania
- Cotoru, a tributary of the Măcriș in Gorj County, Romania

== See also ==
- Cotorca (disambiguation)
- Cotoroaia (disambiguation)
