= Racovăț (disambiguation) =

Racovăț may refer to:

- Racovăț, a commune in Soroca district, Moldova
- Racovăț, a village in Pomârla Commune, Botoșani County, Romania
- Racovăț (Prut), a tributary of the Prut in Moldova
- Racovăț, a tributary of the Bahna in Mehedinți County, Romania

== See also ==
- Racova (disambiguation)
