= Costică =

Costică is a Romanian male given name that may refer to:

- Costică Acsinte
- Costică Dafinoiu
- Costică Olaru
- Costică Toma
