= Crivățu =

Crivăţu may refer to several villages in Romania:

- Crivăţu, a village in Cuca, Argeș
- Crivăţu, a village in Cornești, Dâmbovița

== See also ==
- Crivăț River
