= Talea =

Talea may refer to:

- Repeated rhythmic pattern used in isorhythm
- Talea, Prahova, a commune in Prahova County, Romania
- A brand of Italian amaretto cream liqueur
- Talea, a fictional character from the Spellsinger series by Alan Dean Foster
- Talea, a 2013 Austrian film by Katharina Mückstein
