= Racova (disambiguation) =

Racova may refer to several places in Romania:

- Racova, a commune in Bacău County
- Racova, a village in Ilovăţ Commune, Mehedinţi County
- Racova, a village in Supur Commune, Satu Mare County
- Racova, a village in Udeşti Commune, Suceava County
- Racova, a village in Gârceni Commune, Vaslui County
- Racova, a tributary of the Bistrița in Bacău County
- Racova (Bârlad), a tributary of the Bârlad in Vaslui County
- Racova, a tributary of the Suceava in Suceava County

== See also ==
- Racovăț (disambiguation)
- Racovița (disambiguation)
- Racoviță (surname)
- Racoș (disambiguation)
