= Paul Grigoriu =

Romanian journalist (1945–2015)

- Born: 6 March 1945; Bacău, Kingdom of Romania
- Died: 2 April 2015 (aged 70); Buciumeni, Dâmbovița, Romania
- Resting place: Buciumeni, Dâmbovița
- Education: University of Bucharest
- Occupations: Journalist, writer
- Employer: Romanian Radio Broadcasting Company
- Awards: Order of Cultural Merit; National Order of Faithful Service

Paul Grigoriu (6 March 1945 – 2 April 2015) was a Romanian journalist, writer, and program director at Radio România.

== Biography ==
Grigoriu was born in Bacău on 6 March 1945. He was a graduate of the University of Bucharest and since 1969 he has worked at the Romanian Radio. After 1990 he became producer of the show "Matinal" on Radio Romania.

Born on March 6, 1945, in Bacău, Grigoriu was a graduate of the Faculty of Romance, Classical and Oriental Languages the University of Bucharest (French-Spanish section), and since 1969 he has worked at the Romanian Broadcasting, Foreign Writing (REPS), French section. After the Romanian Revolution of 1989, he became the director of the show "Matinal" on Radio România Actualități.

He was the editor-in-chief of Program III (Radio Romania Youth) and - since 1992 - deputy general director of the Romanian Broadcasting. Between October 1994 and September 1995 he was the interim general manager of the Romanian Broadcasting Company. Deputy Director General (Head of National Channels) until 2002, when he resigned. He was a show producer, an exceptional professional and moderator of the daily program "Academic Quarter".

Grigoriu's journalistic career was marked by the summer performances of Radio Vacanța - until 1989 - and by radio programs such as "Noapte alb blue" or "k-drane" that brought him the popular show "Matinal", whose initiator he was after 1990. Radiogenia and his journalistic talent made this show the spearhead of the National Radio audience, at a time when competition with commercial stations was intensifying from Foremost personality of the Romanian Radio (for many even a living emblem of it), "Mr. Radio" marked with his inspired performance the post-December section of the history of Romanian radio.

He also had an intense literary activity, starting with poetry in 1967, in the magazine Amphitheater. His first book was Anatomy of a Street (1992), followed by French Summer (A Romantic in Paris) (1998), The Legacy of the Tinsmith (2000), Radio.grafii. 1969-1989 (2000), Kangaroos at All (Comando at Antipozi) (2001), Beyond the Great Wall (2008), Two for a Childhood (2015), The Wrinkles and Cuts of History (2015). In 2013, Grigoriu also launched the volume G from Gugiumeni. False monograph, Casa Radio Publishing House. He was editor of the Programme III on Radio Romania Youth.

He received two important awards from the Romanian Presidency: the Order of Cultural Merit and the National Order of Faithful Service.

Grigoriu died on 2 April 2015 in Buciumeni, Dâmbovița County.
