= Schela =

Schela may refer to several places in Romania:

- Schela, Gorj, a commune in Gorj County
- Schela, Galați, a commune in Galați County
- Schela, a village in Glodeni Commune, Dâmbovița County
- Schela, a district in the town of Băicoi, Prahova County
- Deparați, a village in Trivalea-Moșteni Commune, Teleorman County, called Schela until 2001
