= Bizdidel =

River in Romania

- Location within Romania

Location
- Country: Romania
- Counties: Prahova, Dâmbovița
- Villages: Talea, Bezdead, Pucioasa, Glodeni

Physical characteristics
- Mouth: Ialomița
  - location: Brănești
  - coordinates: 45.0433°N 25.4332°E
- Length: 26 km (16 mi)
- Basin size: 94 km^{2} (36 sq mi)

Basin features
- Progression: Ialomița→ Danube→ Black Sea

The Bizdidel is a left tributary of the river Ialomița in Romania. It discharges into the Ialomița in Brănești. Its length is 26 km (16 mi) and its basin size is 94 km^{2} (36 sq mi).
