= Valea Babei River =

Valea Babei River is the name of several rivers in Romania:

- Valea Babei, a tributary of the Ialomicioara in Dâmbovița County
- Valea Babei, a tributary of the Prahova in Prahova County
- Valea Babei, a tributary of the Valea Bădenilor in Argeș County
