= Snagov (river) =

- Location within Romania

Location
- Country: Romania
- Counties: Dâmbovița, Ilfov
- Villages: Butimanu, Niculești, Periș, Snagov

Physical characteristics
- Mouth: Ialomița
  - coordinates: 44.7395°N 26.2398°E
- Length: 47 km (29 mi)
- Basin size: 187 km^{2} (72 sq mi)

Basin features
- Progression: Ialomița→ Danube→ Black Sea
- Tributaries
  - left: Ciaur

The Snagov is a right tributary of the river Ialomița in Romania. It discharges into the Ialomița 2 km downstream from Siliștea Snagovului. Lake Snagov is located on the lower reach of the river. Its length is 47 km (29 mi) and its basin size is 187 km^{2} (72 sq mi).
