= Fundata (river) =

- Location within Romania

Location
- Country: Romania
- Counties: Ialomița
- Villages: Cocora, Reviga, Rovine, Crunți, Gheorghe Doja

Physical characteristics
- Mouth: Ialomița
  - location: Misleanu
  - coordinates: 44.5479°N 27.2082°E
- Length: 26 km (16 mi)
- Basin size: 456 km^{2} (176 sq mi)

Basin features
- Progression: Ialomița→ Danube→ Black Sea

The Fundata is a left tributary of the river Ialomița in Romania. It discharges into the Ialomița near Misleanu. Its length is 26 km (16 mi) and its basin size is 456 km^{2} (176 sq mi).
