= Ialomița =

Ialomița may refer to:

- Ialomița County, Romania
- Ialomița (river), Romania

== See also ==
- Ialomicioara River (disambiguation)
