= Livezile =

Livezile ("orchards") may refer to several places in Romania:

- Livezile, Alba, a commune in Alba County
- Livezile, Bistrița-Năsăud, a commune in Bistrița-Năsăud County
- Livezile, Mehedinți, a commune in Mehedinți County
- Livezile, Timiș, a commune in Timiș County
- Livezile, a village in Glodeni Commune, Dâmbovița County
- Livezile, a village in Valea Mare Commune, Dâmbovița County
- Livezile, a village in Vizantea-Livezi Commune, Vrancea County
