= Ialomița (river) =

River in Romania

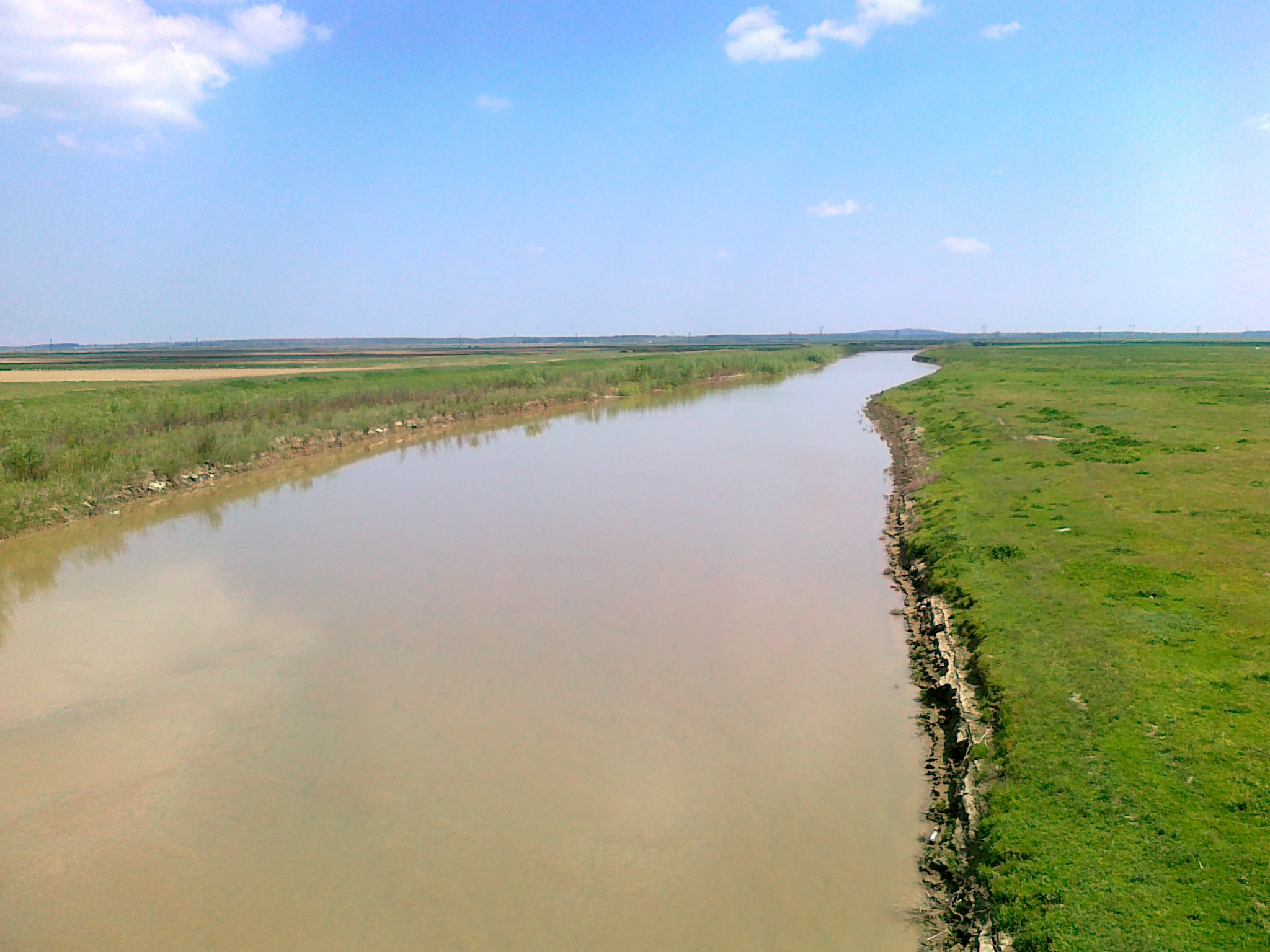
- Ialomița River crossing DN2A

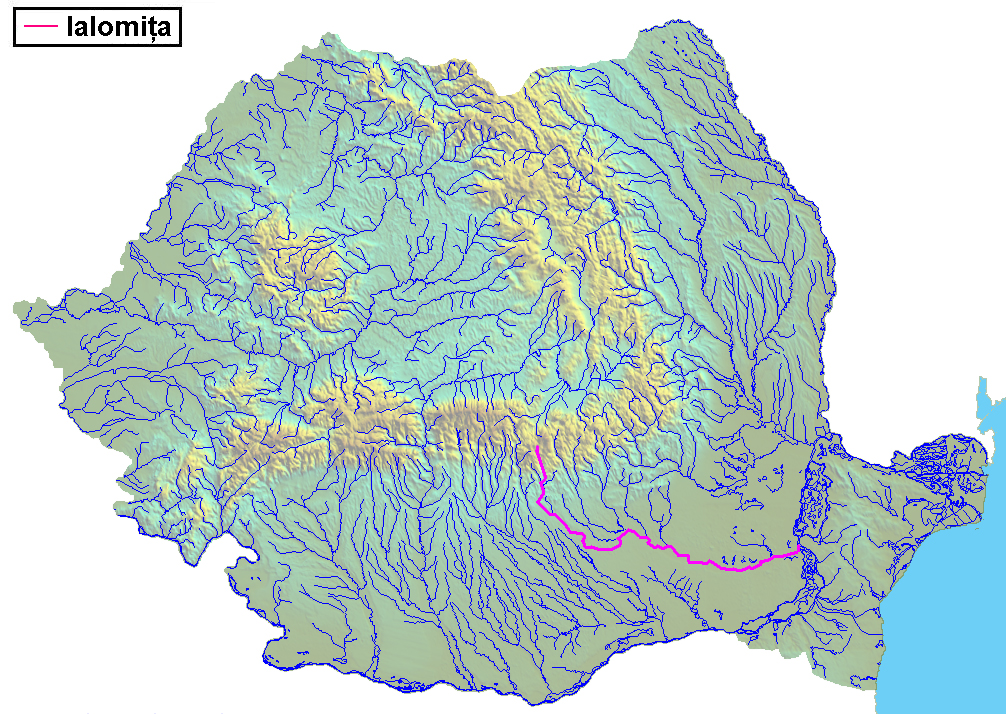
- The Ialomița in Romania

Location
- Country: Romania
- Counties: Dâmbovița; Prahova; Ilfov; Ialomița
- Cities: Târgoviște; Urziceni; Slobozia

Physical characteristics
- Source: Bucegi Mountains
  - location: north of Moroeni
- Mouth: Danube
  - location: near Hârșova
  - coordinates: 44°41′54″N 27°51′21″E
- Length: 417 km (259 mi)
- Basin size: 10,350 km^{2} (4,000 sq mi)
- Discharge
  - location: mouth
  - average: 45 m^{3}/s (1,600 cu ft/s)

Basin features
- Progression: Danube→ Black Sea
- Tributaries
  - left: Prahova

The Ialomița (Romanian: râul Ialomița [ˈjalomitsa]) is a river of Southern Romania. It rises from the Bucegi Mountains in the Carpathians. It discharges into the Borcea branch of the Danube in Giurgeni. It is 417 km (259 mi) long, and its basin area is 10,350 km^{2} (4,000 sq mi). Its average discharge at the mouth is 45 m^{3}/s (1,600 cu ft/s). Ialomița County takes its name from this river.

The upper reach of the river is sometimes known as Valea Obârșiei or Obârșia Ialomiței.

== Localities ==
The following localities are situated along the river Ialomița, from source to mouth: Moroeni, Pietroșița, Fieni, Pucioasa, Doicești, Aninoasa, Târgoviște, Răzvad, Comișani, Băleni, Finta, Cojasca, Poienarii Burchii, Fierbinți-Târg, Dridu, Urziceni, Manasia, Alexeni, Ion Roată, Sfântu Gheorghe, Balaciu, Căzănești, Ciochina, Andrășești, Perieți, Slobozia, Cosâmbești, Bucu, Sudiți and Țăndărei.

The largest cities along the Ialomița are Târgoviște and Slobozia.

== Tributaries ==
The following rivers are tributaries to the river Ialomița (from source to mouth):

- Left: Valea Șugărilor, Cocora, Lăptici, Scândurari, Blana, Nucet, Oboarele, Scropoasa, Orzea, Brândușa, Gâlma, Ialomicioara (I), Rușeț, Bizdidel, Slănic de Răzvad, Slănic, Pâscov, Crivăț, Cricovul Dulce, Prahova, Sărata, Cotorca, Sărățuica, Fundata, Valea Lată Sărată
- Right: Valea Doamnelor, Valea Sucheniței, Horoaba, Coteanu, Valea Văcăriei, Tătaru, Gâlgoiu, Mircea, Bolboci, Lucăcilă, Zănoaga, Valea Cabanierului, Brătei, Izvorul Rătei, Raciu, Valea Doicii, Seciul cu Colți, Voivodeni, Țâța, Ialomicioara (II), Vulcana, Izvor, Racovița, Sticlărie, Snagov, Cociovaliștea, Comana

== Lakes and dams ==
- Lake Scropoasa
- Lake Snagov

== History ==
The Naparis River, mentioned in Histories Book 4, is likely the modern Ialomița. The Naparis was one of five Scythian Rivers listed by Herodotus which began in Scythia and fed into the Danube.
