= Plaiu =

Plaiu may refer to several villages in Romania:

- Plaiu, a village in Provița de Sus Commune, Prahova County. The word PLAI in Romanian means "alpine pasture".
- Plaiu, a village in Talea Commune, Prahova County
