= Lucăcești =

Lucăcești may refer to several villages in Romania:

- Lucăcești, a village in Mireșu Mare Commune, Maramureș County
- Lucăcești, a village in Drăgoiești Commune, Suceava County

== See also ==
- Luca (disambiguation)
- Lucăceni (disambiguation)
- Lucăcilă River (disambiguation)
