= Bucșa =

Bucșa (older font Bucşa) or Bucsa may refer to several villages:

Romania

- Bucşa, in Răchitoasa Commune, Bacău County
- Bucşa, in Valea Ciorii Commune, Ialomiţa County

Hungary

- Bucsa, Hungary, in Békés County, Southern Great Plain region

== See also ==
- Bucşă - family name from iron bolt on a cartwheel, frequently spelled Bucşa
- Bucșani (disambiguation)
