= Finta, Dâmbovița =

Finta
- Commune
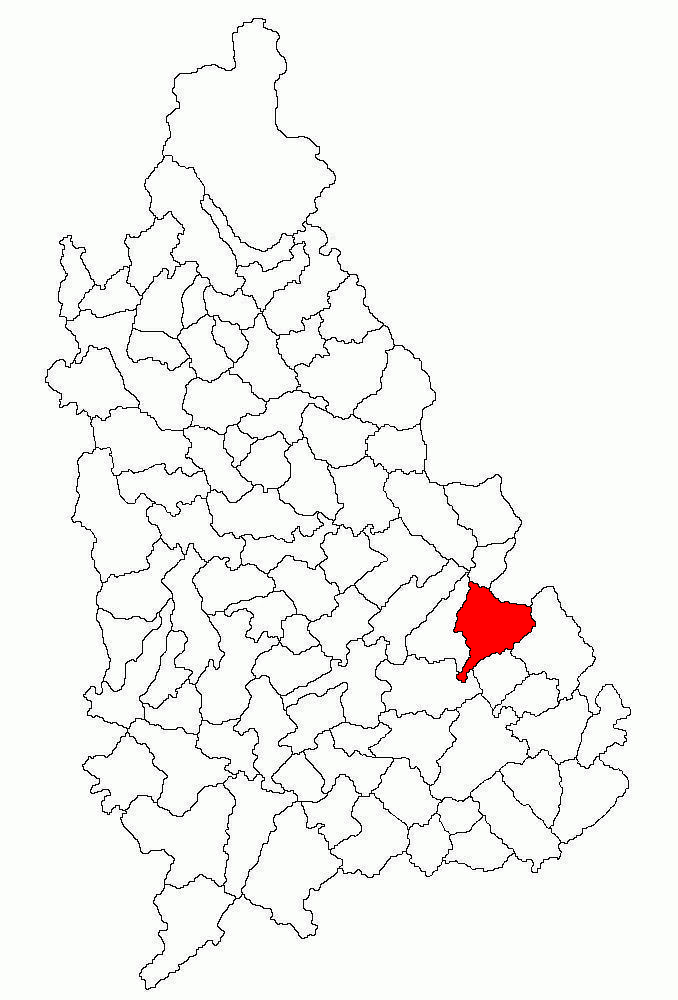
- Location in Dâmbovița County

- Location in Romania
- Coordinates: 44°48′N 25°48′E
- Country: Romania
- County: Dâmbovița

Government
  - Mayor (2020–2024): Florentin Oprea (PNL)
- Area: 49.22 km^{2} (19.00 sq mi)
- Elevation: 156 m (512 ft)
- Population (2021-12-01): 3,686
  - Density: 75/km^{2} (190/sq mi)
- Time zone: EET/EEST (UTC+2/+3)
- Postal code: 137222
- Area code: +(40) 245
- Vehicle reg.: DB
- Website: primariacomuneifinta.ro

Finta is a commune in Dâmbovița County, Muntenia, Romania with a population of 3,686 people as of 2021. It is composed of four villages: Bechinești, Finta Mare (the commune center), Finta Veche, and Gheboaia.

The commune is situated in the Wallachian Plain, at an altitude of 156 m (512 ft), on the banks of the Ialomița River and its tributary, the Pâscov. It is located in the southeastern part of Dâmbovița County, 33 km (21 mi) from the county seat, Târgoviște, on the border with Prahova County; the city of Ploiești is 28 km (17 mi) to the northeast, while Bucharest is 55 km (34 mi) to the southeast.

The Battle of Finta took place here in 1653, leading to a victory of the Wallachian army under the command of Prince Matei Basarab.

Historical population
Year	Pop.	±%
2002	4,668	—
2011	4,225	−9.5%
2021	3,686	−12.8%
Source: Census data
