= Costică Acsinte =

Romanian photographer

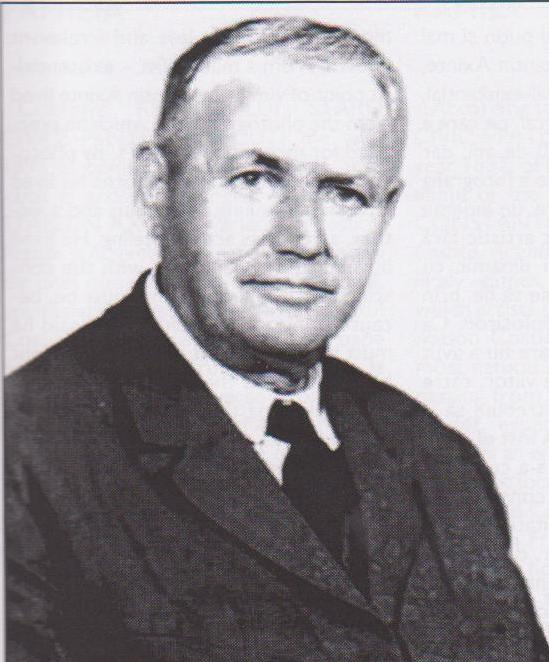
Portrait of Costică Acsinte, on his headstone in the Bora cemetery, Slobozia

Costică Acsinte (born Constantin Axinte; July 4, 1897 in a village of Perieți, Ialomița County, Romania – January 7, 1984 in Slobozia, Romania) was a Romanian photographer.

== Life ==
Constantin Axinte was born on July 4, 1897, in the village of Perieți, Ialomița County, Romania as the second of the seven children of Costache and Maria. He became known by the pseudonym Costică Acsinte, present on the backs of most of his photographs.

He graduated after the 5th grade in Perieți, as a mediocre student.

At the age of 18 he graduated from the Cotroceni Piloting School in Bucharest, but he did not obtain the pilot license (as of April 1, 1913, Romania had only 20 licensed pilots).

With the start of the First World War, Costica Acsinte enrolled as a volunteer war photographer, developing his own photographs as well as the ones of the Romanian pilots and reconnaissance missions. He also developed films for the French reconnaissance missions and even for Russian pilots of the 1st and 3rd Aviation Groups. He activated for the photographic section of the Air Squadron 1 of the Romanian army.

His experiences were immortalized in his private photographic album which contains 84 pages and 327 photographs, the majority of which being accompanied by a short dactylographic description (the album also comprises drawings/sketches and newspaper clippings). Amongst the ones photographed one can find: Ferdinand I of Romania, Queen Marie of Romania, Carol II of Romania, Henri Mathias Berthelot or General Eremia Grigorescu.

Axinte Constantin was demobilized on June 15, 1920, as a sergeant. Between 1920 and 1926, he collaborated with an unknown photographer from Bucharest from which he borrows photographic gear and materials.

He married Elena Dumitru on December 23, 1926 and, shortly after this event, he started rebuilding a house on the Ianache Street, in Slobozia, this being finished only in 1930 (the house was demolished in 1985). Costică Acsinte was the father of three children: Alexandru (Sandu), Ecaterina and Viorica.

1930 he opened a photography studio in the center of the town of Slobozia, called "Foto Splendid Acsinte", working until 1950 with glass plates as photographic support (mostly gelatine silver Agfa plates). Later he switched to sheet film and 35mm and 120 film.

He retired in 1960, his photography studio being demolished shortly after. After 1960, Costică Acsinte continued to take photographs in the neighboring villages of Slobozia, especially in the village of Grivița.

He died on January 7, 1984, being buried in the cemetery of Bora in Slobozia.

Costică Acsinte was awarded 2009 the title of "Honored Citizen" of Slobozia.

== Work ==
Costică Acsinte's legacy consists in more than 9000 film negatives on glass plates, a smaller number of sheet film negatives and an unknown number of photographic prints. Most of the prints bear the stamp of the photography studio “Foto Splendid Acsinte” on the back.

2013 saw the initiation of a project for digitizing this vast collection of moments from the past, some of the works being in an advanced state of degradation. Currently the digital version of Costică Acsinte's works is under public domain and the progress of the digitalization project can be traced on the project's website. The digital photographs can be also seen on Flickr Commons.

== Additional references ==
- George Stoian, Foto Splendid Axinte, Cetatea de Scaun Publishing, Târgoviște, 2009, ISBN 978-973-8966-95-6
