= Lucăceni =

Lucăceni may refer to:

- Lucăceni, a village in Berveni Commune, Satu Mare County, Romania
- Lucăceni, a village in Horeşti Commune, Făleşti district, Moldova

== See also ==
- Luca (disambiguation)
- Lucăcești (disambiguation)
- Lucăcilă River (disambiguation)
