= Mărculești, Ialomița =

Mărculești
- Commune
- Location in Ialomița County

- Location in Romania
- Coordinates: 44°34′N 27°31′E
- Country: Romania
- County: Ialomița

Government
  - Mayor (2024–2028): Romeo Sorin Ciriblan (PSD)
- Area: 43.49 km^{2} (16.79 sq mi)
- Elevation: 18 m (59 ft)
- Population (2021-12-01): 1,433
  - Density: 32.95/km^{2} (85.34/sq mi)
- Time zone: UTC+02:00 (EET)
  - Summer (DST): UTC+03:00 (EEST)
- Postal code: +(40) 243
- Area code: 927092
- Vehicle reg.: IL
- Website: primariamarculesti.ro

Mărculești is a commune located in Ialomița County, Muntenia, Romania. It is composed of a single village, Mărculești, part of Cosâmbești Commune until 2005.

Historical population
Year	Pop.	±%
1899	1,087	—
1925	1,718	+58.0%
2002	1,642	−4.4%
2011	1,505	−8.3%
2021	1,433	−4.8%
Source: Census data
