= Racovița (Ialomița) =

- Location within Romania

Location
- Country: Romania
- Counties: Dâmbovița County
- Villages: Racovița, Băleni-Sârbi, Băleni-Români

Physical characteristics
- Mouth: Ialomița
  - coordinates: 44.8159°N 25.6743°E
- Length: 12 km (7.5 mi)
- Basin size: 18 km^{2} (6.9 sq mi)

Basin features
- Progression: Ialomița→ Danube→ Black Sea

The Racovița is a right tributary of the river Ialomița in Romania. It flows into the Ialomița in Băleni-Români. Its length is 12 km (7.5 mi) and its basin size is 18 km^{2} (6.9 sq mi).
