= Băleni, Dâmbovița =

Băleni
- Commune
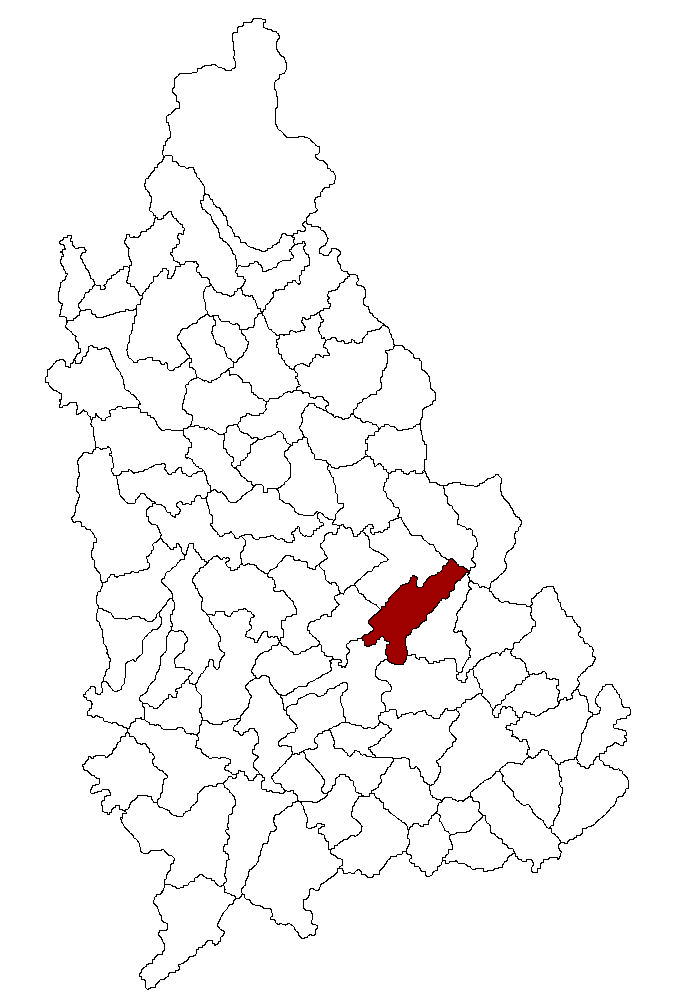
- Location in Dâmbovița County

- Location in Romania
- Coordinates: 44°49′N 25°40′E
- Country: Romania
- County: Dâmbovița

Government
  - Mayor (2020–2024): Florea Mușat (PNL)
- Area: 61.24 km^{2} (23.64 sq mi)
- Elevation: 200 m (700 ft)
- Population (2021-12-01): 7,734
  - Density: 130/km^{2} (330/sq mi)
- Time zone: EET/EEST (UTC+2/+3)
- Postal code: 137010
- Area code: (+40) 0245
- Vehicle reg.: DB
- Website: www.primariabaleni.ro

Băleni is a commune in, Dâmbovița County, Muntenia, Romania. It is composed of two villages, Băleni-Români (the commune center) and Băleni-Sârbi.

The commune is situated in the Wallachian Plain, at an altitude of 200 m (660 ft), on the banks of the Ialomița River and its right tributary, the Racovița. It is located in the central part of Dâmbovița County, 21 km (13 mi) southeast of the county seat, Târgoviște, and 64 km (40 mi) northwest of the country's capital, Bucharest.

Historical population
Year	Pop.	±%
2002	8,324	—
2011	8,368	+0.5%
2021	7,734	−7.6%
Source: Census data

== See also ==
- Dacian fortress of Băleni-Români
