= Vulcana (river) =

- Location within Romania

Location
- Country: Romania
- Counties: Dâmbovița County
- Villages: Vulcana de Sus, Vulcana-Băi, Gura Vulcanei

Physical characteristics
- Source: Dealul Pietrarilor
- Mouth: Ialomița
  - location: Șotânga
  - coordinates: 44.9883°N 25.3887°E
- Length: 20 km (12 mi)
- Basin size: 105 km^{2} (41 sq mi)

Basin features
- Progression: Ialomița→ Danube→ Black Sea
- Tributaries
  - left: Vulcănița
  - right: Sticlărie, Glod

The Vulcana is a right tributary of the river Ialomița in Romania. It discharges into the Ialomița in Șotânga. Its length is 20 km (12 mi) and its basin size is 105 km^{2} (41 sq mi).
