= Cotorca =

Cotorca may refer to:

- Cotorca, Buzău, a village in Glodeanu-Siliștea Commune, Buzău County
- Cotorca, a village in Ciocârlia Commune, Ialomița County
- Cotorca (river), a tributary of the Ialomița
