= Hlinaia, Edineț =

Hlinaia
- Location in Moldova
- Coordinates: 48°13′N 27°15′E
- Country: Moldova
- District: Edineț District
- Established: 1620

Area
  - Total: 13.91 sq mi (36.02 km^{2})
- Elevation: 705 ft (215 m)

Population (2014 census)
  - Total: 1,713
  - Density: 123.2/sq mi (47.56/km^{2})
- Time zone: UTC+2 (EET)
  - Summer (DST): UTC+3 (EEST)
- Postal code: MD-4601
- Area code: +373 246

Hlinaia is a village in Edineț District, Moldova.

== History ==
Hlinaia village is first certified on April 12, 1620, as the "village of Costea Buceac" when given by Gaspar Gratiani, Buceac Costea's possession. In 1664 during Gheorghe Duca, the village is known as the Racovat border. On 25 December 1772, Russian military administration householders found in village 94, which requires them to pay taxes to the tsar. The same administration in 1774 found only 45 householders here. The village grew not only from natural increase but from migration. In 1871 it opened a school literacy. Construction of new schools begins in 1904 and finish in 1906. In 1922 the villagers are allotted land. The 325 families are allotted with 657 ha of land. The village already has a steam mill, primary school, 3 inn, gendarmerie station and city hall. World War II brought suffering and village. After the social changes of 1989–1991, the citizens own their own land. In 1997–2003, the village is part of Edinet County, and in 2003 the district lists.

== Demographics ==
=== Ethnic groups ===
Ethnic group	Population	% of total*
Moldovans	1,669	97.4%
Ukrainians	22	1.3%
Romanians	12	0.7%
Russians	6	0.4%
Others	4	0.23%

Historical population
Year	Pop.	±%
1870	1,184	—
1923	1,488	+25.7%
1940	1,897	+27.5%
1941	2,102	+10.8%
1979	2,032	−3.3%
1989	1,983	−2.4%
2004	1,921	−3.1%
2014	1,713	−10.8%
