= Manole Aldescu =

Romanian cross-country skier (born 1929)

Manole Aldescu (born 18 February 1929) was a Romanian cross-country skier who competed in the 1950s. He finished 10th in the 4 x 10 km event at the 1952 Winter Olympics in Oslo. He was born in Talea, Prahova County.
