= Cotorca (river) =

- Location within Romania

Location
- Country: Romania
- Counties: Buzău, Ialomița
- Villages: Ciocârlia, Cotorca

Physical characteristics
- Mouth: Ialomița
  - location: Urziceni
  - coordinates: 44.7083°N 26.6261°E
- Length: 18 km (11 mi)
- Basin size: 78 km^{2} (30 sq mi)

Basin features
- Progression: Ialomița→ Danube→ Black Sea

The Cotorca is a left tributary of the river Ialomița in Romania. It discharges into the Ialomița in Urziceni. Its length is 18 km (11 mi) and its basin size is 78 km^{2} (30 sq mi).
