= Dacian fortress of Băleni-Români =

- Location within Romania
- 44.825°N 25.699°E
- Location: Cetatea tătarilor, Băleni-Români, Dâmbovița, Romania

Site notes
- Condition: Ruined

Monument istoric
- Reference no.: DB-I-s-B-16959

It was a Dacian fortified town.
