= Raco =

Raco may refer to:

- RACO, Representative Association of Commissioned Officers, Ireland
- Raco, Michigan, U.S.
- Danny Raco (born 1979), Australian actor
- Rob Raco (born 1989), Canadian actor
- Raco Army Airfield, a former airfield near Sault Ste. Marie, Michigan, U.S.

== See also ==
- Racoș (disambiguation)
- Racault
