= Ulmi, Dâmbovița =

Ulmi
- Commune
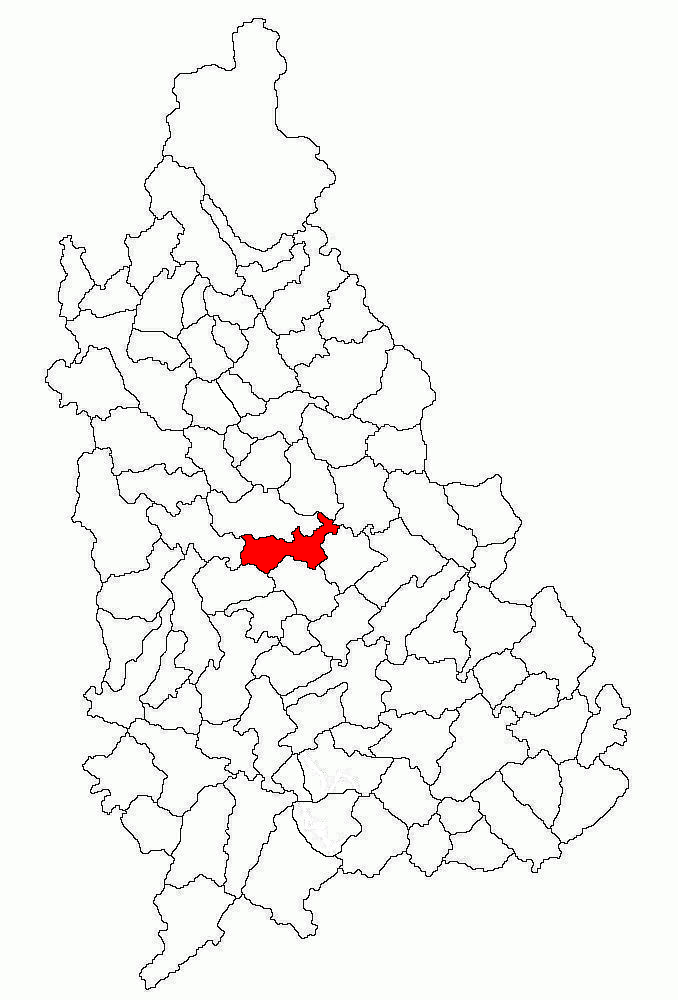
- Location in Dâmbovița County

- Location in Romania
- Coordinates: 44°55′N 25°29′E
- Country: Romania
- County: Dâmbovița

Government
  - Mayor (2020–2024): Petruț-Bogdan Tița (PSD)
- Area: 36.2 km^{2} (14.0 sq mi)
- Elevation: 256 m (840 ft)
- Population (2021-12-01): 5,280
  - Density: 150/km^{2} (380/sq mi)
- Time zone: EET/EEST (UTC+2/+3)
- Postal code: 137455
- Area code: +(40) 245
- Vehicle reg.: DB
- Website: www.ulmi.ro

Ulmi is a commune in Dâmbovița County, Muntenia, Romania. It is composed of eight villages: Colanu, Dimoiu, Dumbrava, Matraca, Nisipurile, Udrești, Ulmi, and Viișoara.

Historical population
Year	Pop.	±%
2002	3,944	—
2011	4,359	+10.5%
2021	5,280	+21.1%
Source: Census data

== Natives ==
- Iulian Mihăescu (born 1962), footballer
