= Crivăț (river) =

- Location within Romania

Location
- Country: Romania
- Counties: Prahova, Dâmbovița
- Villages: Gura Crivățului, Cornești

Physical characteristics
- Mouth: Ialomița
  - coordinates: 44.7454°N 25.9254°E
- Length: 29 km (18 mi)
- Basin size: 102 km^{2} (39 sq mi)

Basin features
- Progression: Ialomița→ Danube→ Black Sea

The Crivăț is a left tributary of the river Ialomița in Romania. It discharges into the Ialomița in Crivățu. Its length is 29 km (18 mi) and its basin size is 102 km^{2} (39 sq mi).
