= Bezdead =

- Commune
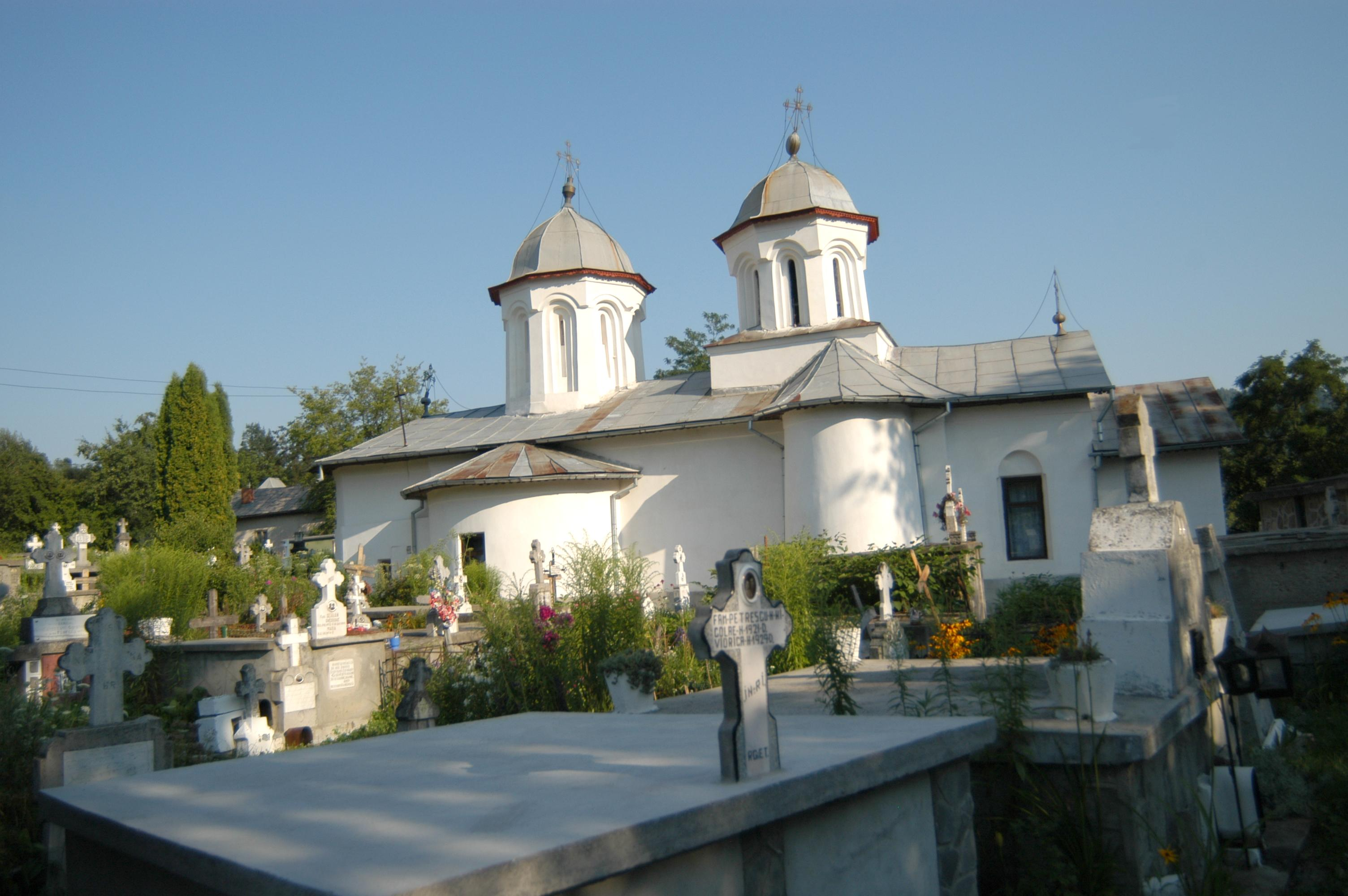
- Orthodox church in Măgura

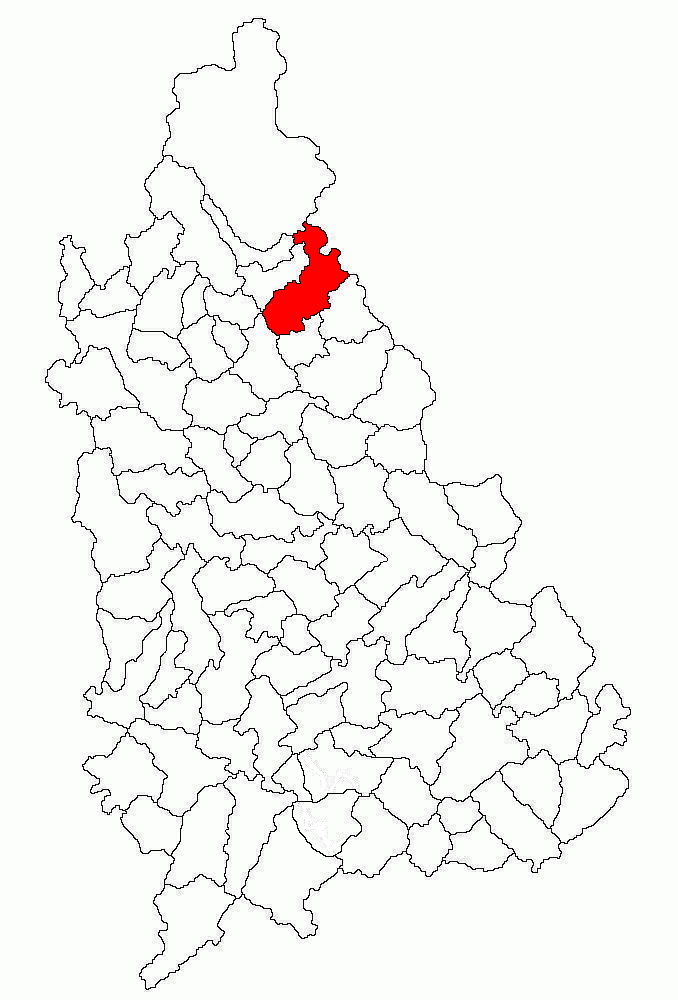
- Location in Dâmbovița County

- Location in Romania
- Coordinates: 45°9′N 25°31′E
- Country: Romania
- County: Dâmbovița

Government
  - Mayor (2024–2028): Teodora Anghelescu (PNL)
- Area: 57.57 km^{2} (22.23 sq mi)
- Elevation: 544 m (1,785 ft)
- Population (2021-12-01): 4,115
  - Density: 71.48/km^{2} (185.1/sq mi)
- Time zone: UTC+02:00 (EET)
  - Summer (DST): UTC+03:00 (EEST)
- Postal code: 137035
- Area code: +(40) 245
- Vehicle reg.: DB
- Website: www.bezdead.ro

Bezdead is a commune in the northeast of Dâmbovița County, Muntenia, Romania. It is composed of six villages: Bezdead, Broșteni, Costișata, Măgura, Tunari, and Valea Morii. It has a population of 4,115 as of 2021.

Historical population
Year	Pop.	±%
2002	5,123	—
2011	4,595	−10.3%
2021	4,115	−10.4%
Source: Census data
