= Ialomicioara (right tributary) =

Ialomicioara Vaca
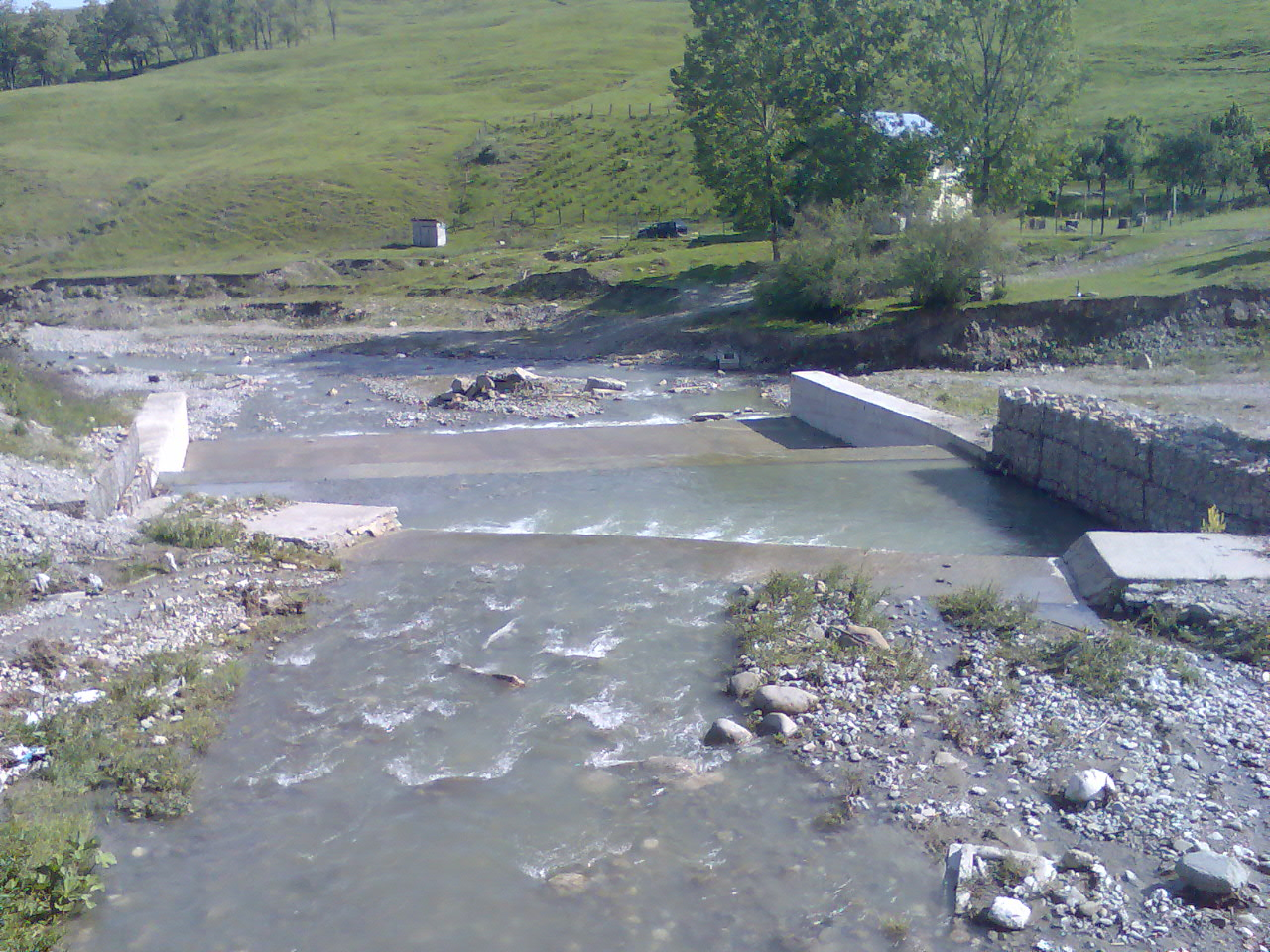

- Location within Romania

Location
- Country: Romania
- Counties: Dâmbovița County
- Villages: Ferestre, Runcu, Fieni

Physical characteristics
- Mouth: Ialomița
  - location: Fieni
  - coordinates: 45.1167°N 25.4178°E
- Length: 27 km (17 mi)
- Basin size: 95 km^{2} (37 sq mi)

Basin features
- Progression: Ialomița→ Danube→ Black Sea
- Tributaries
  - left: Valea Babei, Valea Orlei, Dulbanu, Crângul Mușii
  - right: Valea Frumușelului, Pârâul Stroiei, Negrița, Homoriciu
- River code: XI.1.7

The Ialomicioara is a right tributary of the river Ialomița in Romania. It discharges into the Ialomița at Fieni. The upper reach of the river is also known as Vaca. Its length is 27 km (17 mi) and its basin size is 95 km^{2} (37 sq mi).
