= Brătei =

- Location within Romania

Location
- Country: Romania
- Counties: Dâmbovița County

Physical characteristics
- Source: Bucegi Mountains
- Mouth: Ialomița
  - coordinates: 45.2914°N 25.4051°E
- Length: 14 km (8.7 mi)
- Basin size: 55 km^{2} (21 sq mi)

Basin features
- Progression: Ialomița→ Danube→ Black Sea
- River code: XI.1.1

The Brătei is a right tributary of the river Ialomița in Romania. Its source is in the Bucegi Mountains. It flows into the Ialomița in Dobrești. Its length is 14 km (8.7 mi) and its basin size is 55 km^{2} (21 sq mi).

== Tributaries ==
The following rivers are tributaries to the river Brătei (from source to mouth):

Left: Valea lui Marco, Văcăria, La Poduri, Valea lui Bădescu, Vâlcelul Lucăcilă, Valea lui Moise, Lucăcilă, Izvorul Zănoagei

Right: Duda Mare, Duda Mică, Valea Neagră, Mitarca, Pârâul Sec, Șutila
