= Bucșă =

Bucșă (older font Bucşă), pronounced with a short final ă [ə], also frequently spelled as Bucșa and pronounced with a long final -a [a], is a Romanian family name. The name comes from the iron bolt on a cartwheel.

Those with the name:

- Dan Bucșă (born 1988), Romanian footballer
- Ion Bucsa (born 1968), Moldovan biathlete
- Cristina Bucșa (born 1998), Moldovan-born Spanish tennis player

== See also ==
- Bucşa (disambiguation)
