= Cosâmbești =

- Commune
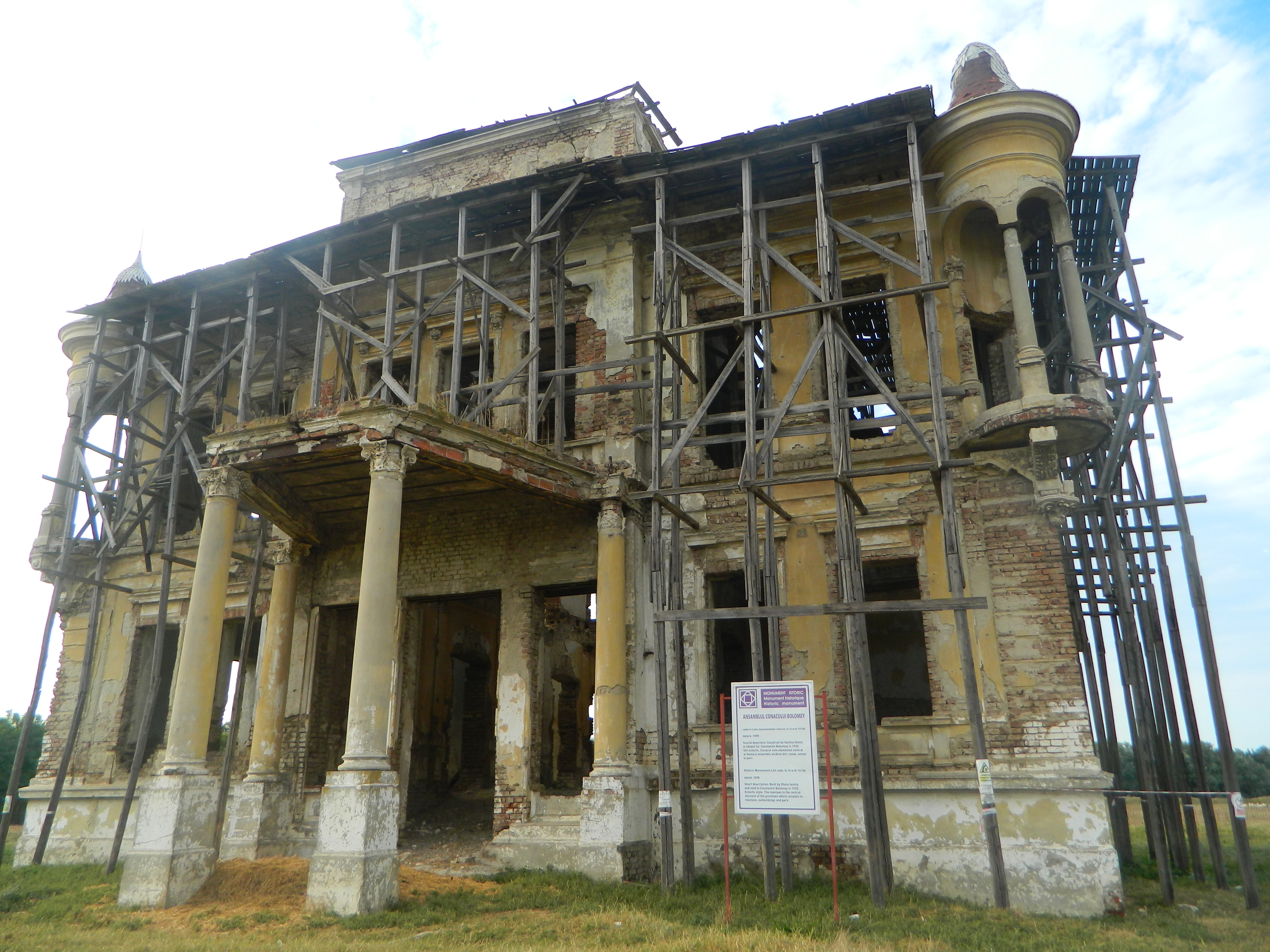
- Bolomey mansion in Cosâmbești

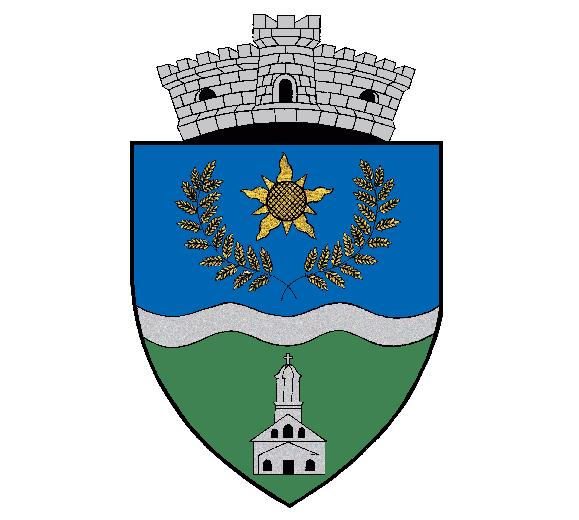
- Coat of arms

- Location in Ialomița County

- Location in Romania
- Coordinates: 44°34′N 27°26′E
- Country: Romania
- County: Ialomița

Government
  - Mayor (2024–2028): Bogdan Popescu (PSD)
- Area: 42.18 km^{2} (16.29 sq mi)
- Elevation: 22 m (72 ft)
- Population (2021-12-01): 1,853
  - Density: 43.93/km^{2} (113.8/sq mi)
- Time zone: UTC+02:00 (EET)
  - Summer (DST): UTC+03:00 (EEST)
- Postal code: 927090
- Area code: +(40) 243
- Vehicle reg.: IL
- Website: www.primariacosimbesti.ro

Cosâmbești is a commune located in Ialomița County, Muntenia, Romania. It is composed of two villages, Cosâmbești and Gimbășani. It also included the village of Mărculești until 2005, when this was split off to form Mărculești Commune.

Historical population
Year	Pop.	±%
1899	2,395	—
1925	2,742	+14.5%
2002	1,876	−31.6%
2011	1,902	+1.4%
2021	1,853	−2.6%
Source: Census data
