= Runcu, Dâmbovița =

Runcu
- Commune
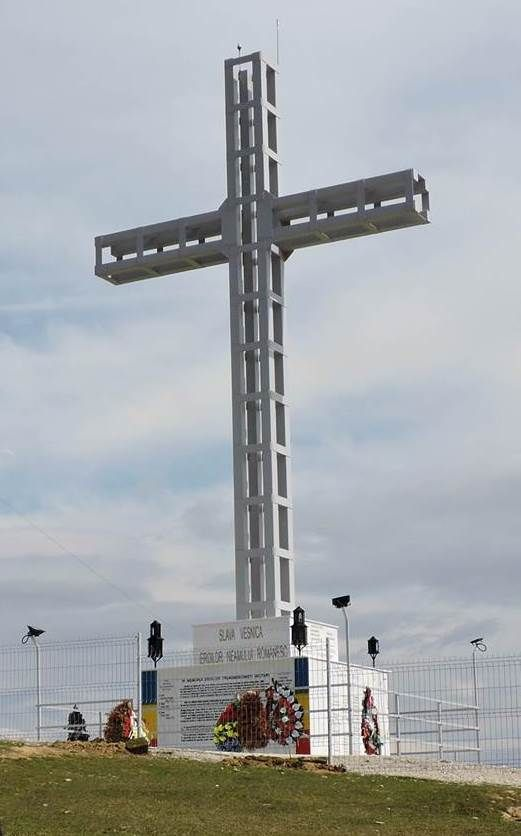
- Heroes' Cross on In's Hill

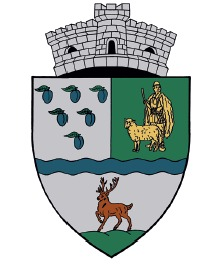
- Coat of arms

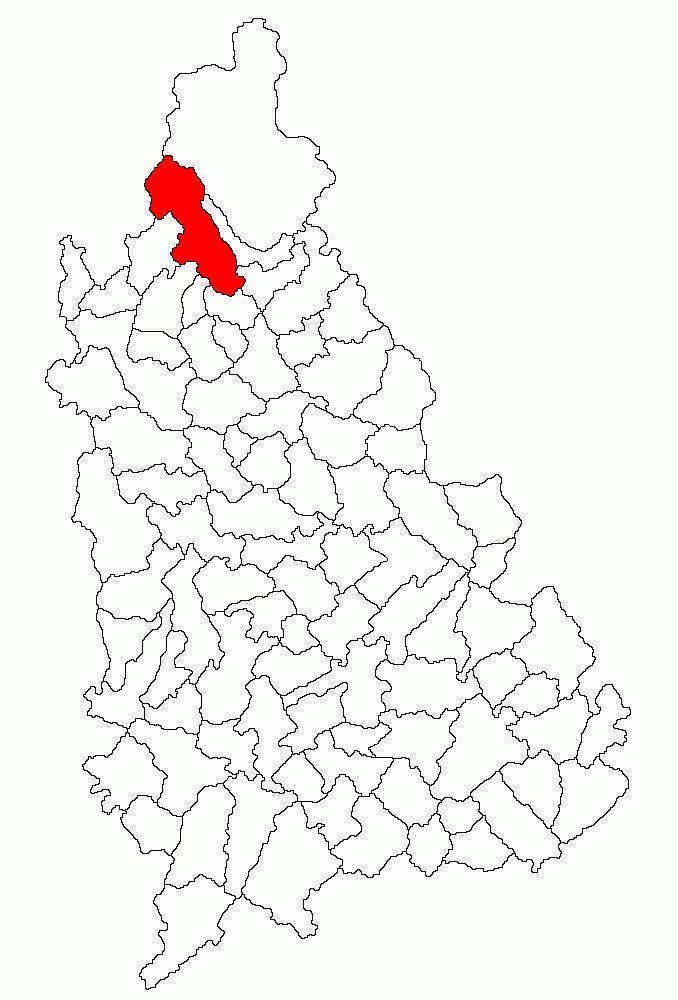
- Location in Dâmbovița County

- Location in Romania
- Coordinates: 45°11′N 25°23′E
- Country: Romania
- County: Dâmbovița

Government
  - Mayor (2020–2024): Gheorghe Brebeanu (PSD)
- Area: 79.15 km^{2} (30.56 sq mi)
- Elevation: 562 m (1,844 ft)
- Population (2021-12-01): 3,555
  - Density: 44.91/km^{2} (116.3/sq mi)
- Time zone: UTC+02:00 (EET)
  - Summer (DST): UTC+03:00 (EEST)
- Postal code: 137400
- Area code: +(40) 245
- Vehicle reg.: DB
- Website: primaria-runcu-db.ro

Runcu is a commune in Dâmbovița County, Muntenia, Romania with a population of 3,555 people as of 2021. It is composed of six villages: Bădeni, Brebu, Ferestre, Piatra, Runcu, and Siliștea.

Historical population
Year	Pop.	±%
2002	4,597	—
2011	4,327	−5.9%
2021	3,555	−17.8%
Source: Census data
