= Rovine, Ivanjica =

Rovine Ровине
- Village
- Location within Serbia
- Coordinates: 43°27′N 20°10′E
- Country: Serbia
- District: Moravica District
- Municipality: Ivanjica

Area
  - Total: 9.20 km^{2} (3.55 sq mi)

Population (2011)
  - Total: 59
  - Density: 6.4/km^{2} (17/sq mi)
- Time zone: UTC+1 (CET)
  - Summer (DST): UTC+2 (CEST)

Rovine is a village in the municipality of Ivanjica, Serbia. According to the 2011 census, the village has a population of 59 inhabitants.
