= Racoș (disambiguation) =

Racoș is a commune in Brașov County, Romania.

Racoș may also refer to:

- Racoș River (Râul Negru), Romania
- Racoș River (Someș), Romania

== See also ==
- Raco (disambiguation)
