= Vulcana-Băi =

- Commune
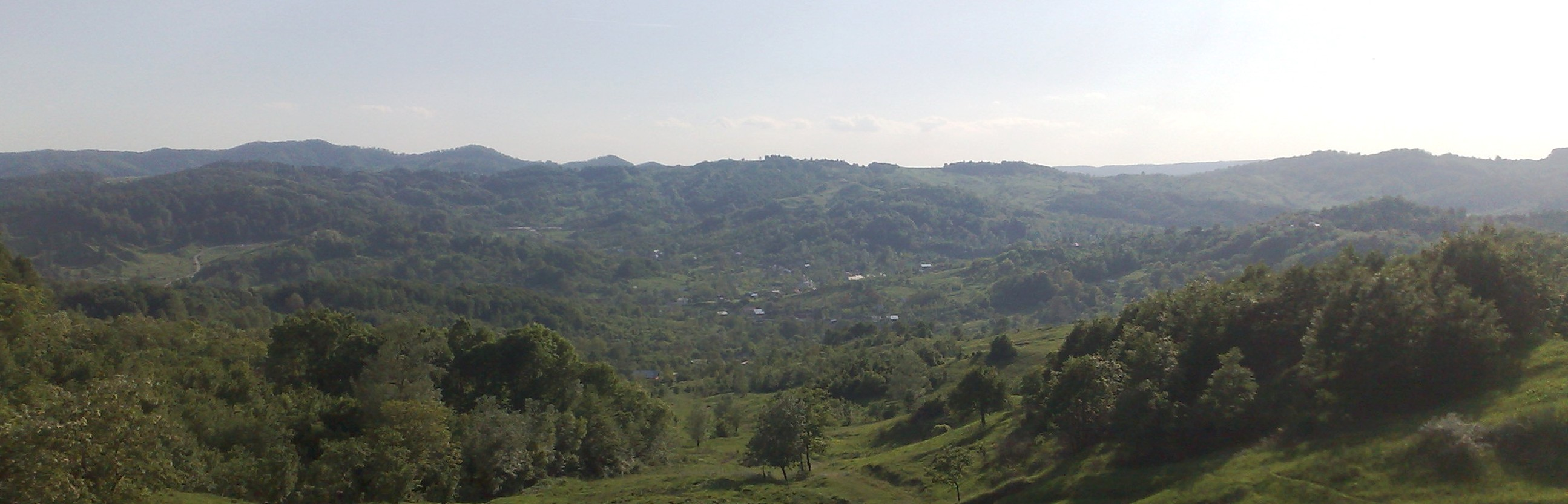
- Vulcana-Băi, viewed from the north

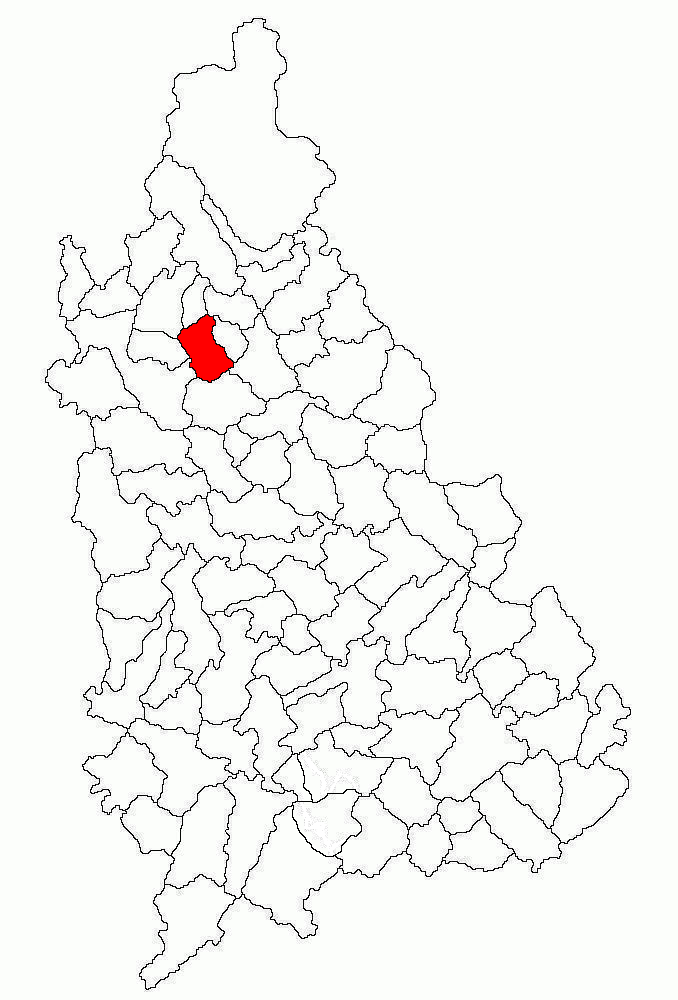
- Location in Dâmbovița County

- Location in Romania
- Coordinates: 45°5′N 25°22′E
- Country: Romania
- County: Dâmbovița

Government
  - Mayor (2024–2028): Emil Drăghici (Ind.)
- Area: 28.15 km^{2} (10.87 sq mi)
- Elevation: 380 m (1,250 ft)
- Population (2021-12-01): 2,934
  - Density: 104.2/km^{2} (269.9/sq mi)
- Time zone: UTC+02:00 (EET)
  - Summer (DST): UTC+03:00 (EEST)
- Postal code: 137535
- Area code: +(40) 245
- Vehicle reg.: DB
- Website: vulcanabai.ro

Vulcana-Băi is a commune in Dâmbovița County, Muntenia, Romania with a population of 2,934 people as of 2021. It is composed of three villages: Nicolaești, Vulcana-Băi, and Vulcana de Sus.

The commune is located in the northern part of the county, 22 km (14 mi) away from the county seat, Târgoviște.

The Orthodox Bunea Monastery, founded in 1654, is situated on the territory of the commune.

Historical population
Year	Pop.	±%
2002	3,008	—
2011	3,052	+1.5%
2021	2,934	−3.9%
Source: Census data
