= Ciocârlia, Ialomița =

Ciocârlia
- Commune
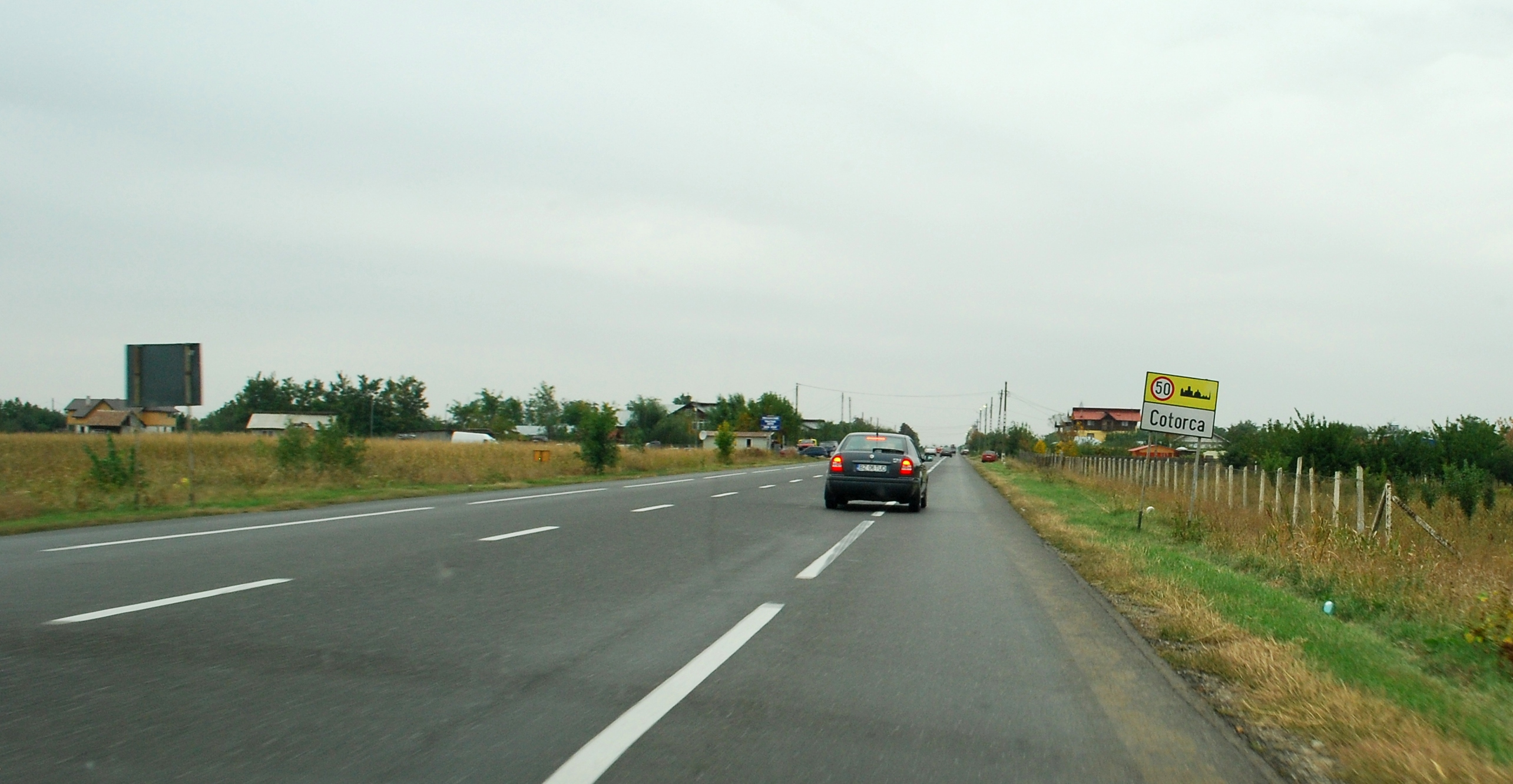
- DN2 entering Cotorca

- Location in Ialomița County

- Location in Romania
- Coordinates: 44°48′N 26°40′E
- Country: Romania
- County: Ialomița

Government
  - Mayor (2024–2028): Eugen Voicilă (PSD)
- Area: 12.84 km^{2} (4.96 sq mi)
- Elevation: 64 m (210 ft)
- Population (2021-12-01): 761
  - Density: 59.3/km^{2} (154/sq mi)
- Time zone: UTC+02:00 (EET)
  - Summer (DST): UTC+03:00 (EEST)
- Postal code: 927070
- Area code: +(40) 243
- Vehicle reg.: IL
- Website: primaria-ciocirlia.ro

Ciocârlia is a commune located in Ialomița County, Muntenia, Romania. It is composed of two villages, Ciocârlia and Cotorca.

Historical population
Year	Pop.	±%
2002	889	—
2011	806	−9.3%
2021	761	−5.6%
Source: Census data
