= Talea, Prahova =

Talea
- Commune
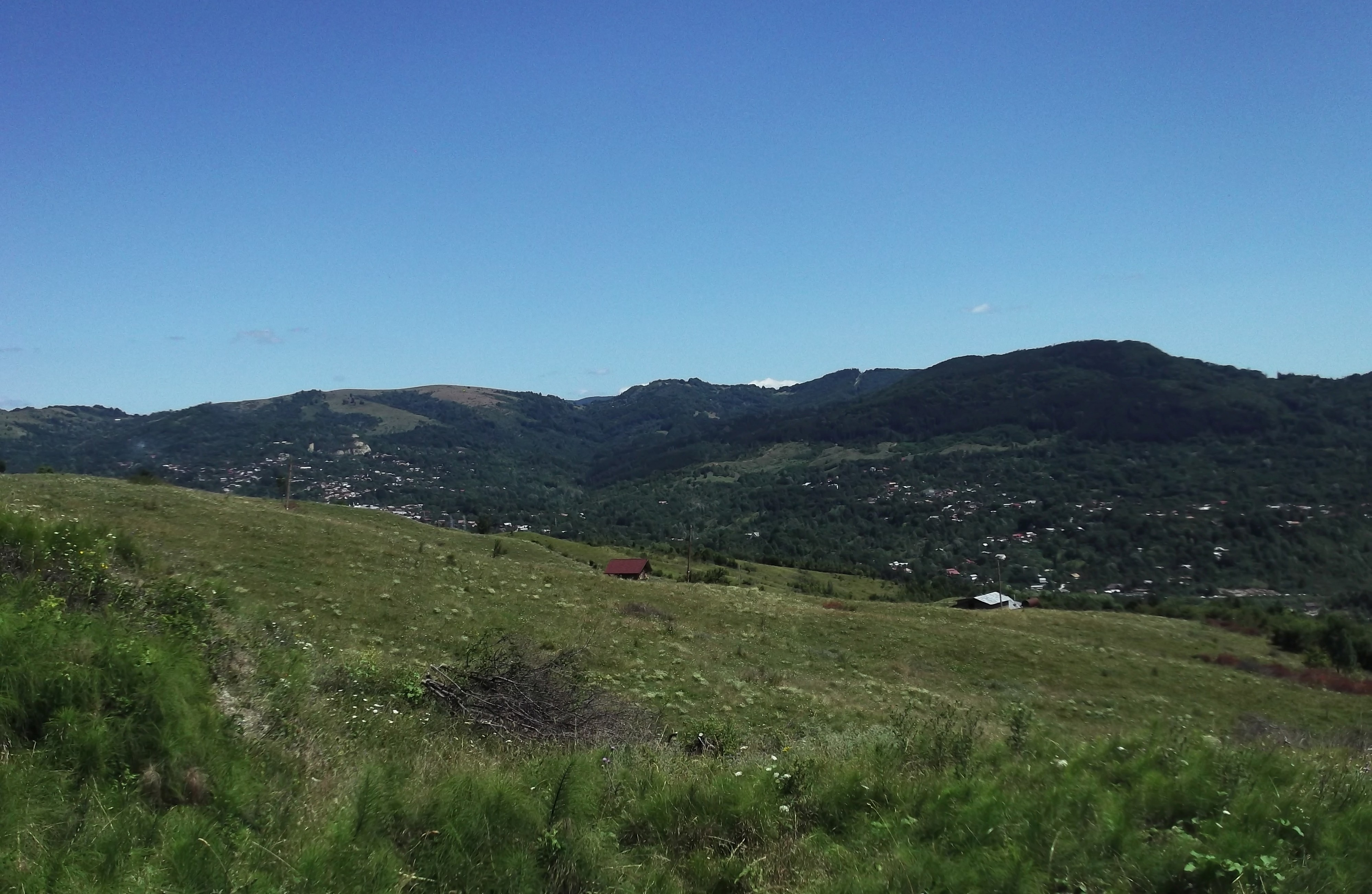
- Talea: view towards Comarnic

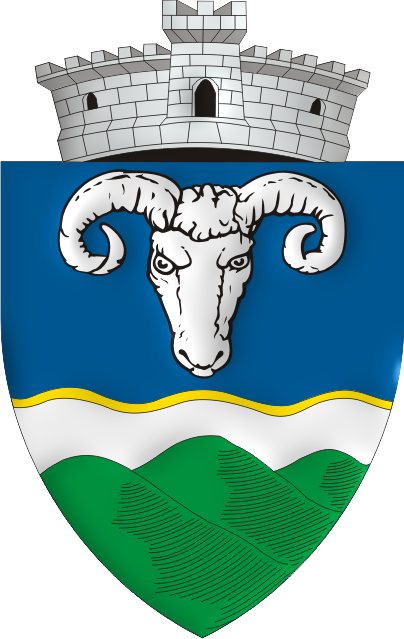
- Coat of arms

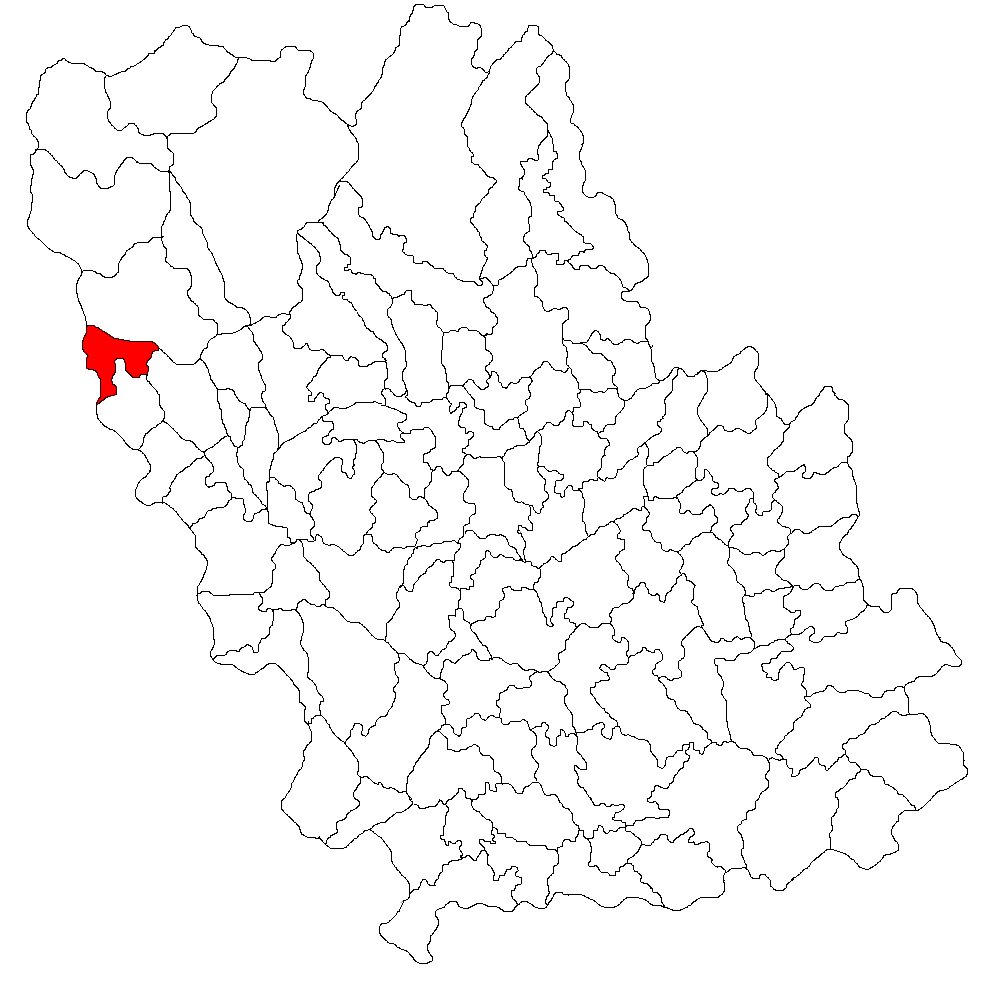
- Location in Prahova County

- Location in Romania
- Coordinates: 45°13′31″N 25°34′02″E
- Country: Romania
- County: Prahova

Government
  - Mayor (2020–2024): Cristian Neagoe (PSD)
- Area: 24.85 km^{2} (9.59 sq mi)
- Elevation: 800 m (2,600 ft)
- Population (2021-12-01): 925
  - Density: 37.2/km^{2} (96.4/sq mi)
- Time zone: UTC+02:00 (EET)
  - Summer (DST): UTC+03:00 (EEST)
- Postal code: 107580
- Area code: +(40) 244
- Vehicle reg.: PH
- Website: www.comunatalea.ro

Talea is a commune in Prahova County, Muntenia, Romania. It is composed of two villages, Plaiu and Talea.

The commune is situated in the southern foothills of the Southern Carpathians, at an altitude of 800 m (2,600 ft), on the banks of the river Bizdidel. It is located in the northwestern part of Prahova County, 52 km (32 mi) from the county seat, Ploiești, just west of the towns of Breaza and Comarnic, on the border with Dâmbovița County. Talea is crossed east to west by county road DJ206, which connects Breaza with Moreni.

Historical population
Year	Pop.	±%
1992	1,390	—
2002	1,204	−13.4%
2011	1,074	−10.8%
2021	925	−13.9%
Source: Census data

== Natives ==
- Manole Aldescu (born 1929), cross-country skier
