= Reviga =

- Commune
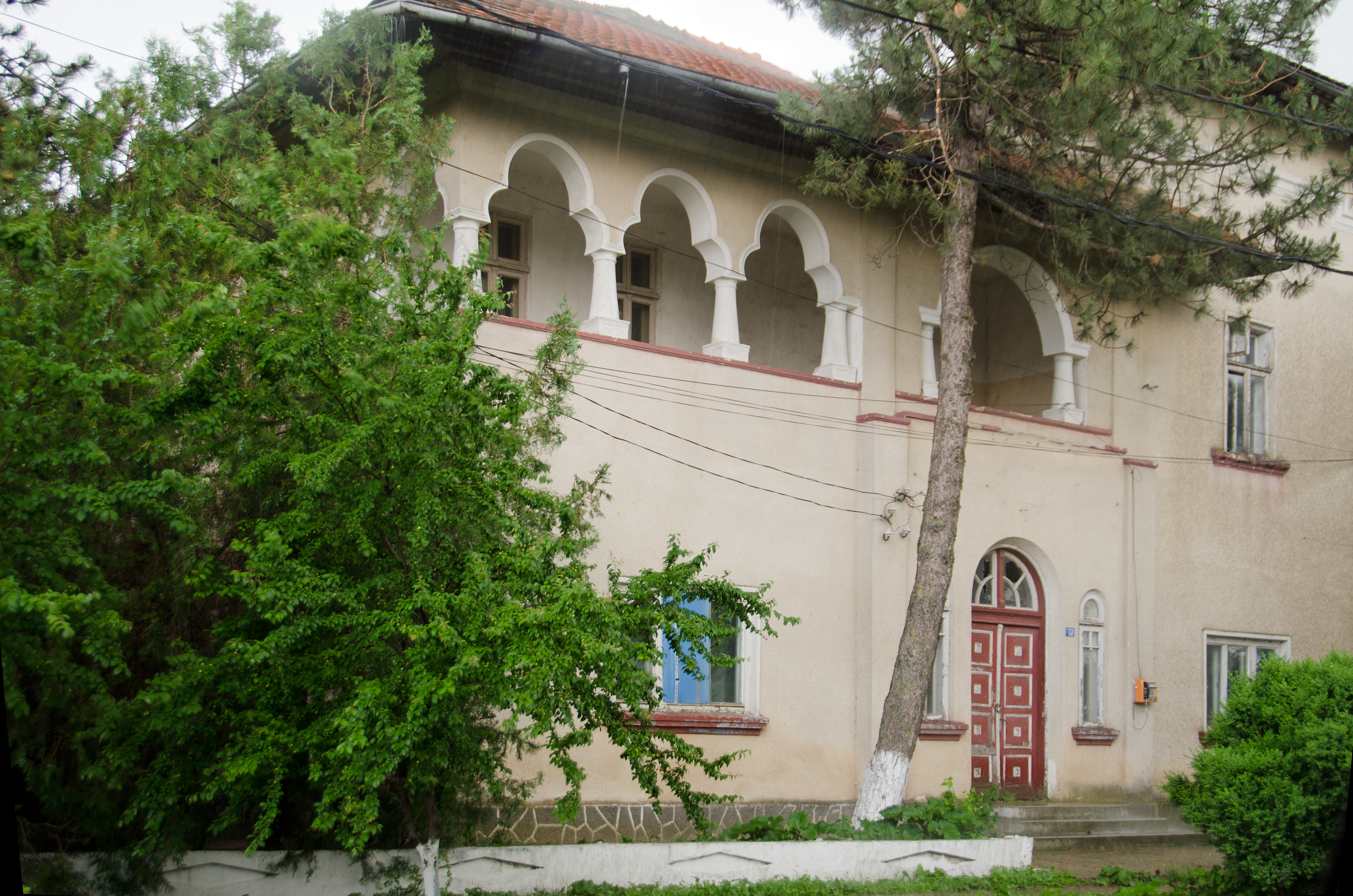
- Mansion in Reviga

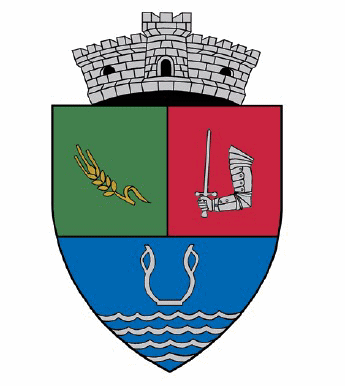
- Coat of arms

- Location in Ialomița County

- Location in Romania
- Coordinates: 44°43′N 27°6′E
- Country: Romania
- County: Ialomița

Government
  - Mayor (2024–2028): Nițu Barbu (PSD)
- Area: 88.16 km^{2} (34.04 sq mi)
- Elevation: 45 m (148 ft)
- Population (2021-12-01): 2,373
  - Density: 26.92/km^{2} (69.71/sq mi)
- Time zone: UTC+02:00 (EET)
  - Summer (DST): UTC+03:00 (EEST)
- Postal code: 927195
- Area code: +(40) 243
- Vehicle reg.: IL
- Website: comunareviga.ro

Reviga is a commune located in Ialomița County, Muntenia, Romania. It is composed of four villages: Crunți, Mircea cel Bătrân, Reviga, and Rovine.

Historical population
Year	Pop.	±%
1899	1,255	—
1925	2,735	+117.9%
2002	3,376	+23.4%
2011	2,742	−18.8%
2021	2,373	−13.5%
Source: Census data
