= Racovăț =

- Village
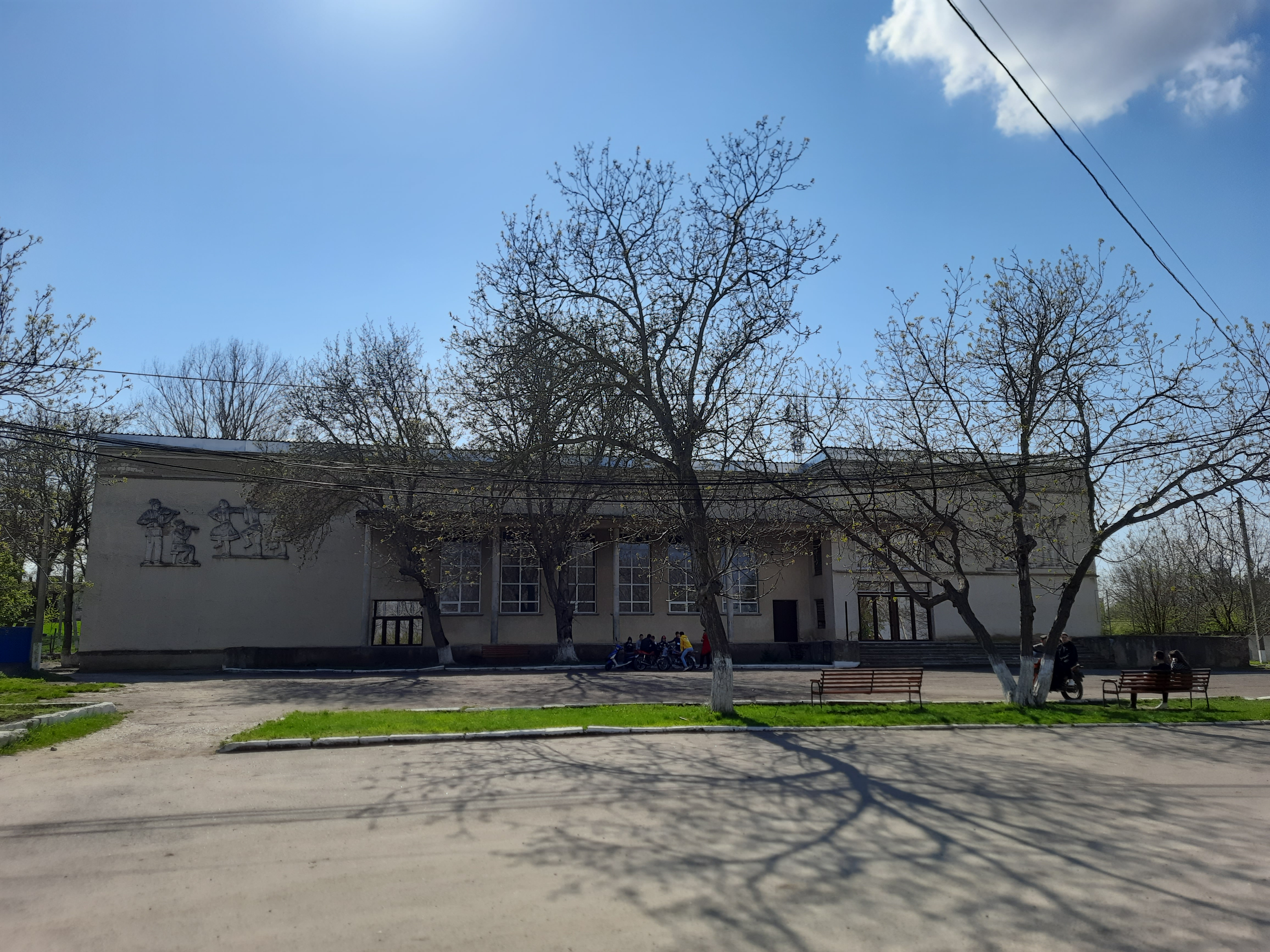

- Location within Moldova
- Coordinates: 48.0825°N 28.4061111111°E
- Country: Moldova
- District: Soroca District

Government
  - Mayor: Fedco Oxana (PN)

Population (2014 census)
  - Total: 2,906
- Time zone: UTC+2 (EET)
  - Summer (DST): UTC+3 (EEST)

Racovăț is a village in Soroca District, Moldova.
