= Niculești =

- Commune
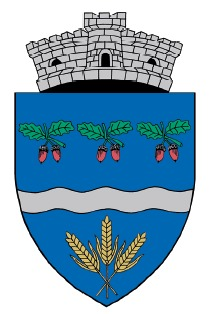
- Coat of arms

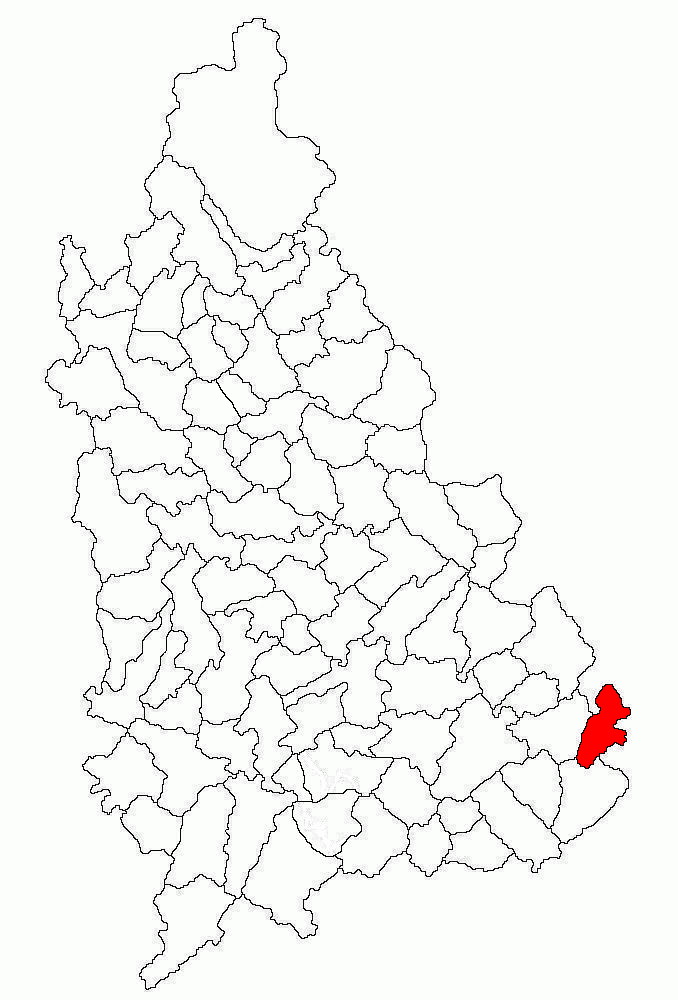
- Location in Dâmbovița County

- Location in Romania
- Coordinates: 44°41′N 25°57′E
- Country: Romania
- County: Dâmbovița

Government
  - Mayor (2024–2028): Dorinel Soare (PSD)
- Area: 27.86 km^{2} (10.76 sq mi)
- Elevation: 114 m (374 ft)
- Population (2021-12-01): 4,627
  - Density: 170/km^{2} (430/sq mi)
- Time zone: EET/EEST (UTC+2/+3)
- Postal code: 137330
- Area code: +(40) 245
- Vehicle reg.: DB
- Website: niculesti.ro

Niculești is a commune in Dâmbovița County, Muntenia, Romania with a population of 4,627 people as of 2021. It is composed of three villages: Ciocănari, Movila, and Niculești.

Historical population
Year	Pop.	±%
2002	4,547	—
2011	4,964	+9.2%
2021	4,627	−6.8%
Source: Census data
