= Buciumeni, Dâmbovița =

Buciumeni
- Commune
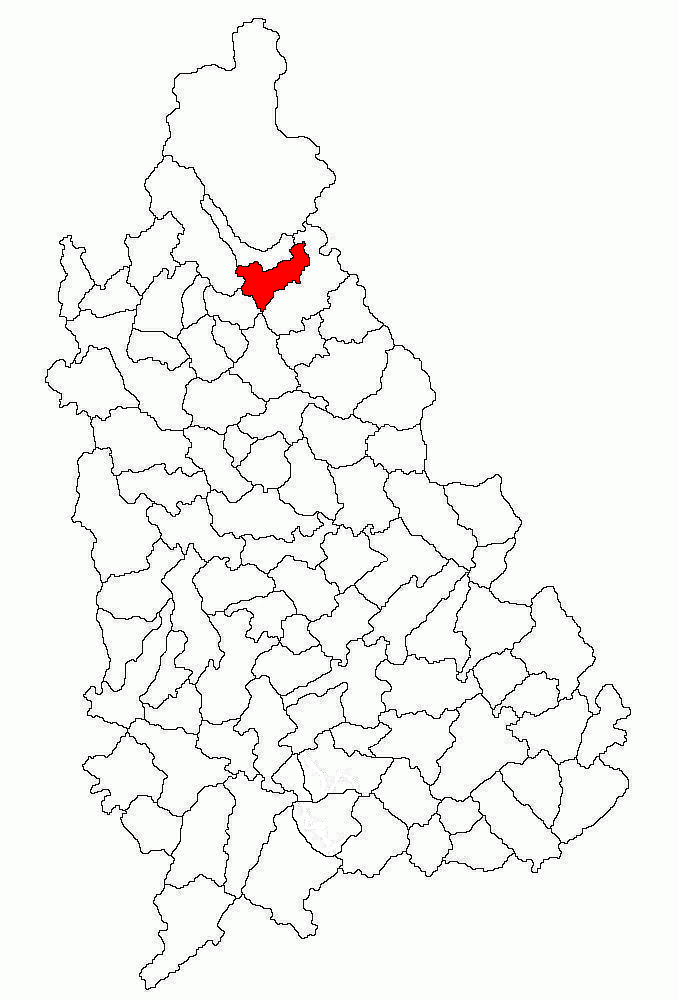
- Location in Dâmbovița County

- Location in Romania
- Coordinates: 45°9′N 25°27′E
- Country: Romania
- County: Dâmbovița

Government
  - Mayor (2024–2028): Ion Pavel (PSD)
- Area: 28.7 km^{2} (11.1 sq mi)
- Elevation: 477 m (1,565 ft)
- Population (2021-12-01): 4,231
  - Density: 150/km^{2} (380/sq mi)
- Time zone: EET/EEST (UTC+2/+3)
- Postal code: 137065
- Area code: +(40) 245
- Vehicle reg.: DB
- Website: buciumeni.ro

Buciumeni is a commune in Dâmbovița County, Muntenia, Romania. It is composed of three villages: Buciumeni, Dealu Mare, and Valea Leurzii.

Historical population
Year	Pop.	±%
2002	4,652	—
2011	4,586	−1.4%
2021	4,231	−7.7%
Source: Census data
