= Comișani =

- Commune
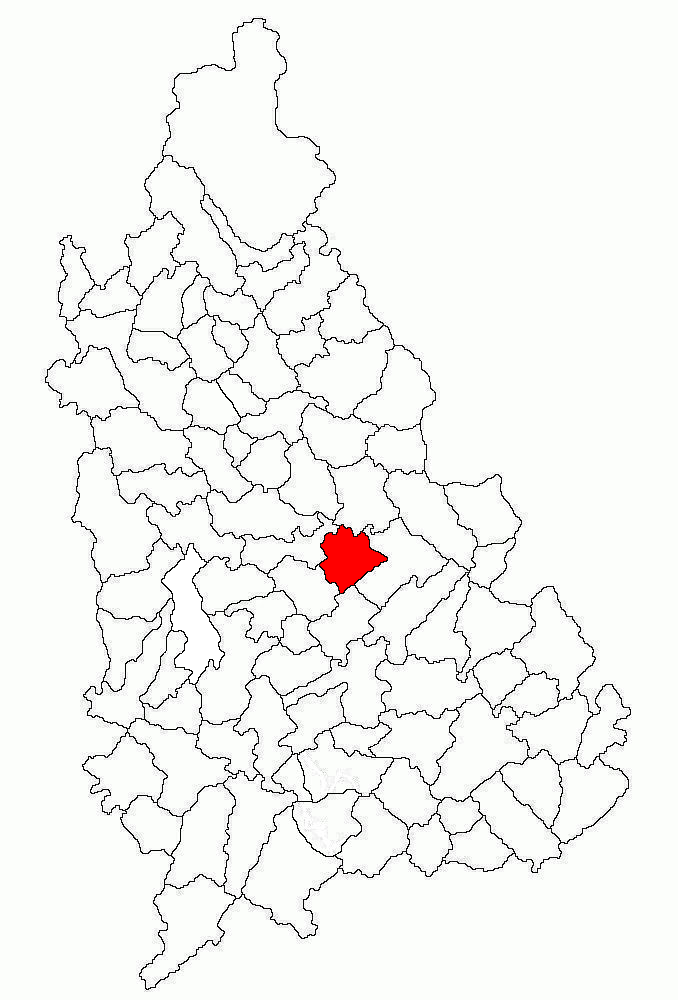
- Location in Dâmbovița County

- Location in Romania
- Coordinates: 44°53′N 25°35′E
- Country: Romania
- County: Dâmbovița

Government
  - Mayor (2024–2028): Ion Bătrânu (PSD)
- Area: 34.64 km^{2} (13.37 sq mi)
- Elevation: 227 m (745 ft)
- Population (2021-12-01): 5,538
  - Density: 160/km^{2} (410/sq mi)
- Time zone: EET/EEST (UTC+2/+3)
- Postal code: 137120
- Area code: +(40) 245
- Vehicle reg.: DB
- Website: www.comisani.ro

Comișani is a commune in Dâmbovița County, Muntenia, Romania with a population of 5,538 people as of 2021. It is composed of two villages, Comișani and Lazuri.

Historical population
Year	Pop.	±%
2002	5,448	—
2011	5,400	−0.9%
2021	5,538	+2.6%
Source: Census data
