= Pietroșița =

- Commune
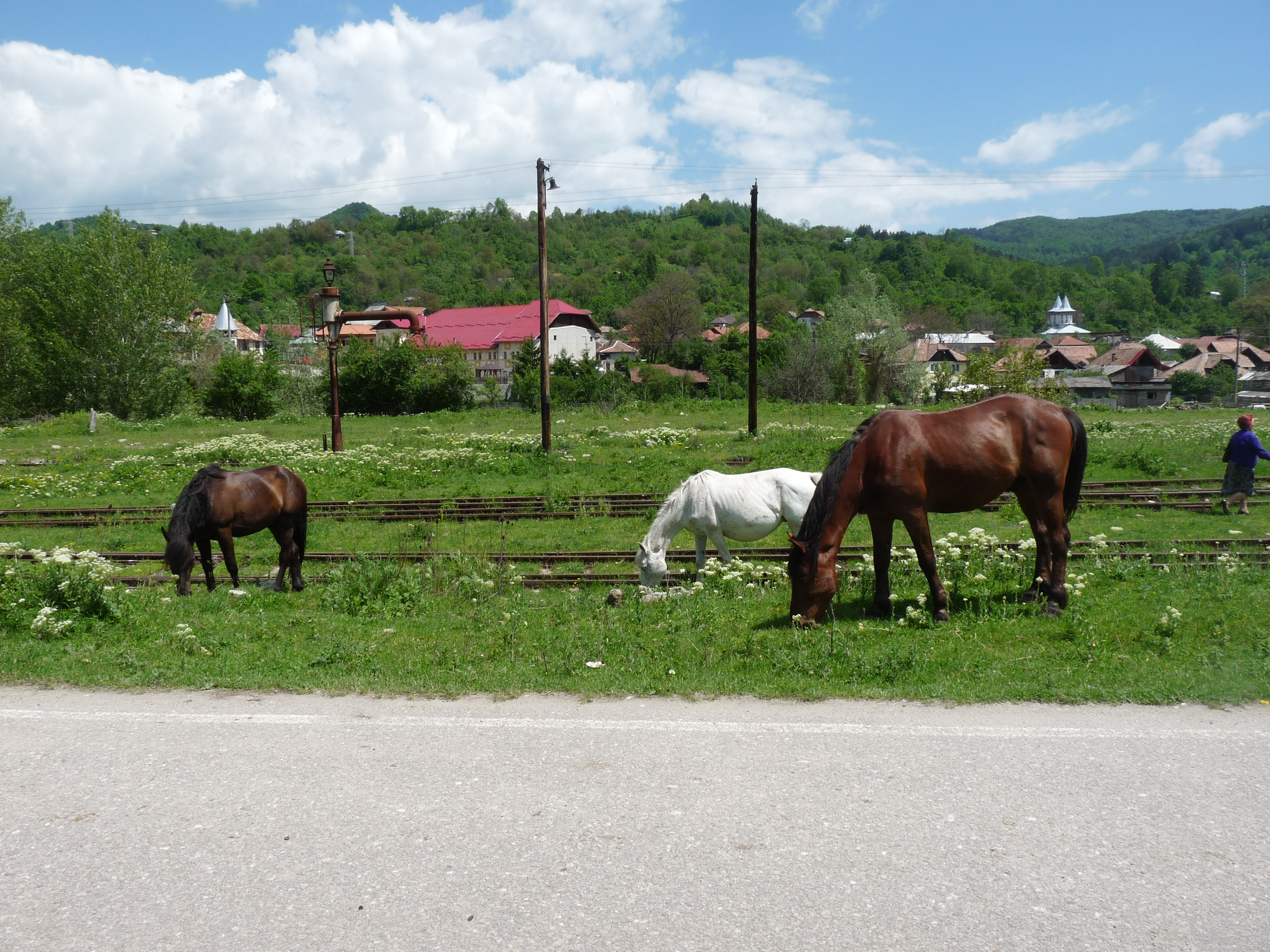
- Pietroșița

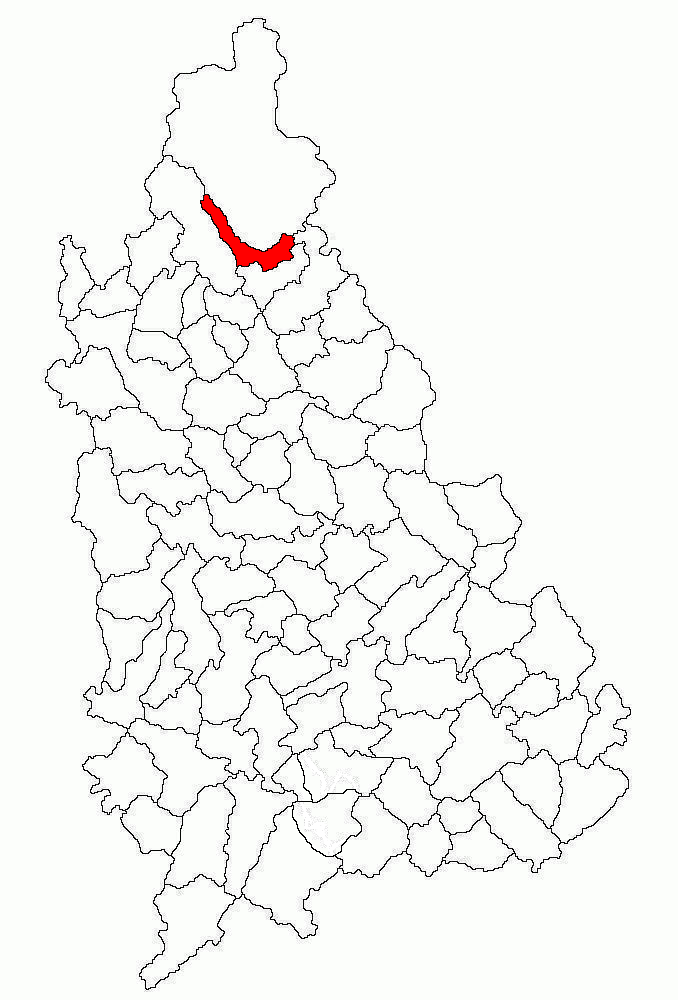
- Location in Dâmbovița County

- Location in Romania
- Coordinates: 45°11′N 25°26′E
- Country: Romania
- County: Dâmbovița

Government
  - Mayor (2024–2028): Ion Dicu (PSD)
- Area: 27.07 km^{2} (10.45 sq mi)
- Elevation: 562 m (1,844 ft)
- Population (2021-12-01): 3,006
  - Density: 111.0/km^{2} (287.6/sq mi)
- Time zone: UTC+02:00 (EET)
  - Summer (DST): UTC+03:00 (EEST)
- Postal code: 137360
- Area code: +(40) 245
- Vehicle reg.: DB
- Website: www.primariapietrositadb.ro

Pietroșița is a commune in Dâmbovița County, Muntenia, Romania with a population of 3,006 people as of 2021. It is composed of two villages, Dealu Frumos and Pietroșița. The name is derived from the compound Piatra (meaning stone) and șița (meaning slate).

It is served by a direct rail connection to Bucharest and is known for the high quality of its drinking water.

Historical population
Year	Pop.	±%
2002	3,341	—
2011	3,170	−5.1%
2021	3,006	−5.2%
Source: Census data

== Natives ==
- Daniel Popa (born 1995), footballer
