= Glodeni, Dâmbovița =

Glodeni
- Commune
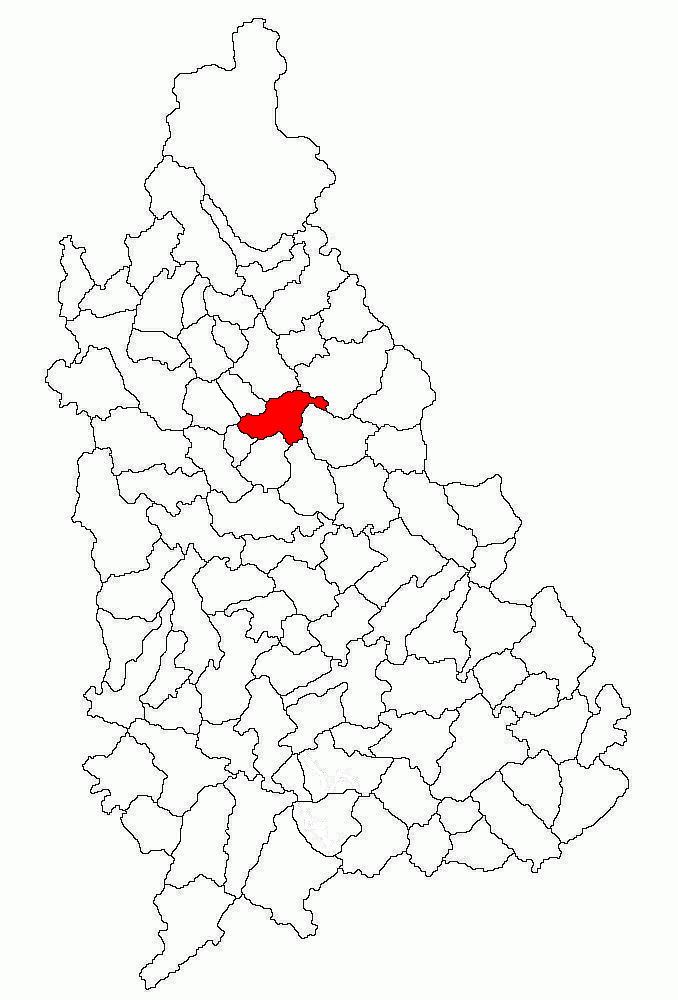
- Location in Dâmbovița County

- Location in Romania
- Coordinates: 45°1′N 25°27′E
- Country: Romania
- County: Dâmbovița

Government
  - Mayor (2024–2028): Gheorghe Chiran (PNL)
- Elevation: 322 m (1,056 ft)
- Population (2021-12-01): 3,936
- Time zone: EET/EEST (UTC+2/+3)
- Postal code: 137225
- Area code: +(40) 245
- Vehicle reg.: DB
- Website: comunaglodeni.ro

Glodeni is a commune in Dâmbovița County, Muntenia, Romania, with a population of 3,936 people as of 2021. It is composed of six villages: Glodeni, Gușoiu, Lăculețe, Livezile, Malu Mierii, and Schela.

Historical population
Year	Pop.	±%
2002	4,435	—
2011	4,226	−4.7%
2021	3,936	−6.9%
Source: Census data
