= Bucșani, Dâmbovița =

Bucșani
- Commune
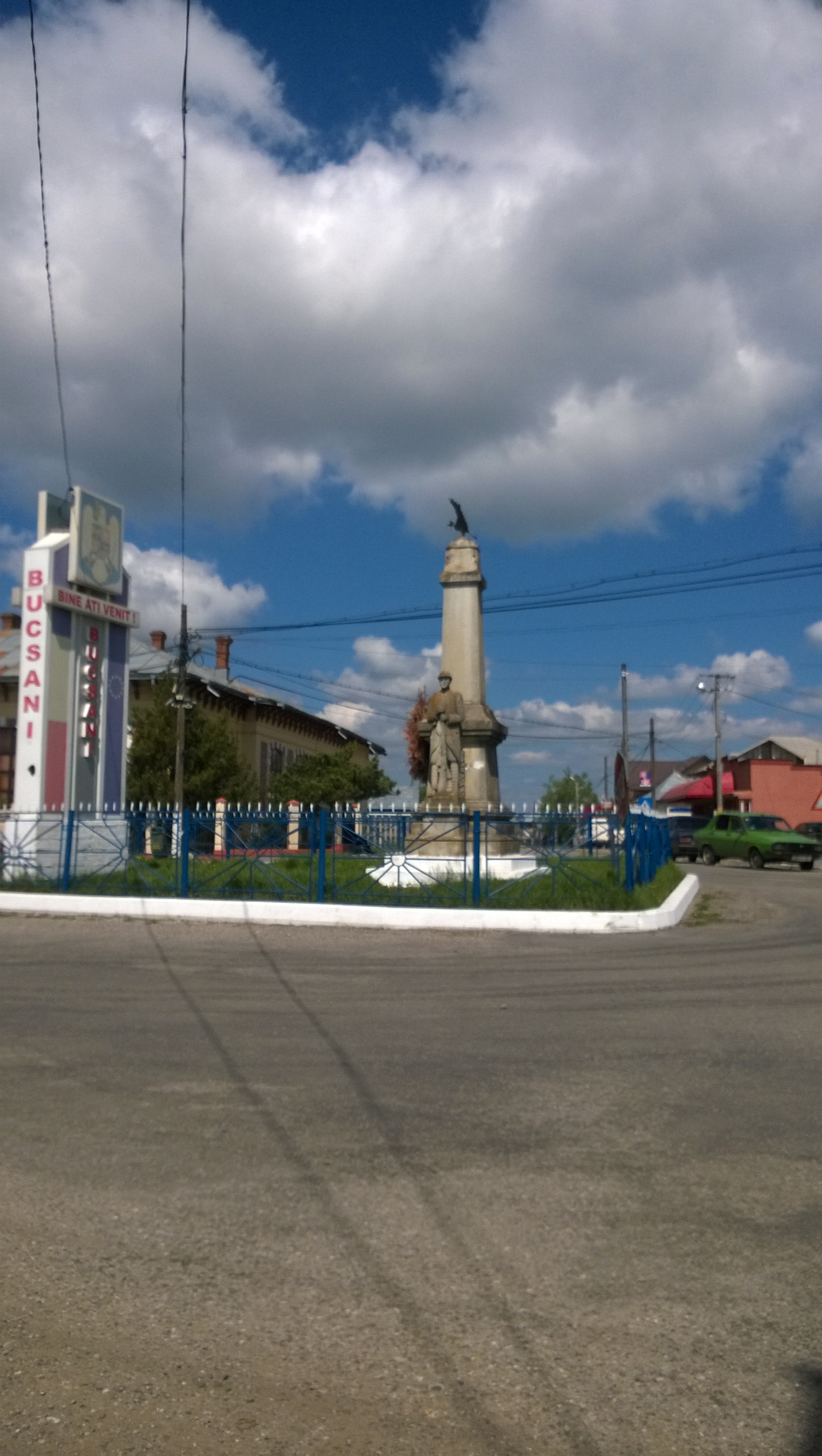
- Heroes' monument in Bucșani

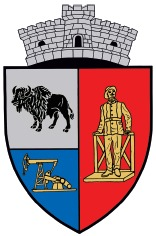
- Coat of arms

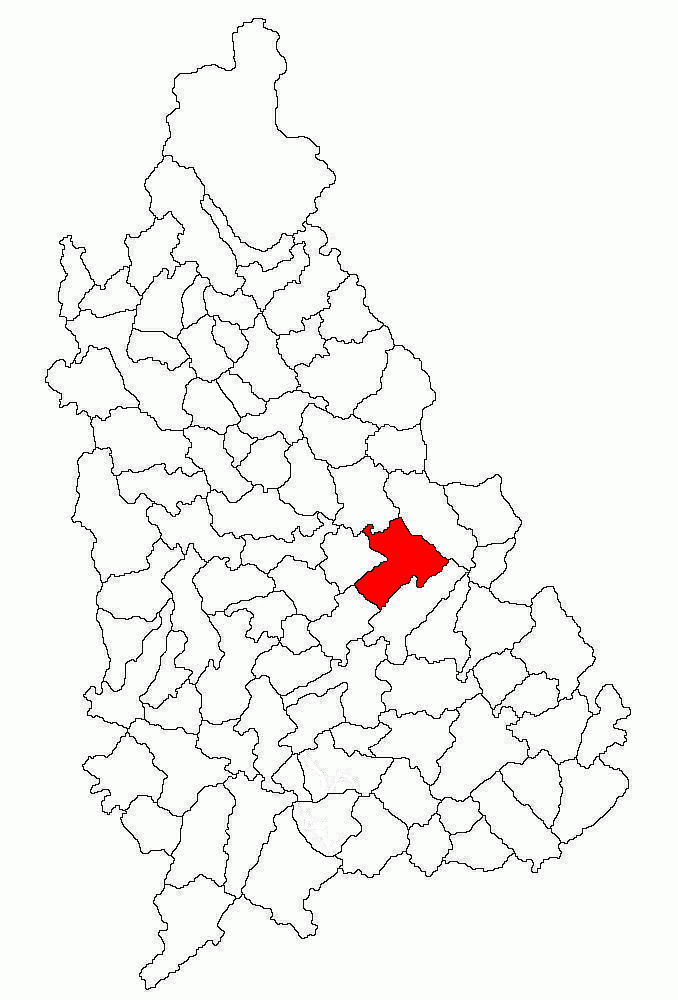
- Location in Dâmbovița County

- Location in Romania
- Coordinates: 44°52′N 25°39′E
- Country: Romania
- County: Dâmbovița

Government
  - Mayor (2024–2028): Valentin-Darian Șuțoiu (PNL)
- Area: 58.09 km^{2} (22.43 sq mi)
- Elevation: 203 m (666 ft)
- Population (2021-12-01): 6,092
  - Density: 104.9/km^{2} (271.6/sq mi)
- Time zone: UTC+02:00 (EET)
  - Summer (DST): UTC+03:00 (EEST)
- Postal code: 137070
- Area code: +(40) 245
- Vehicle reg.: DB
- Website: www.bucsani.ro

Bucșani is a commune in Dâmbovița County, Muntenia, Romania. It is composed of four villages: Bucșani, Hăbeni, Racovița, and Rățoaia.

Historical population
Year	Pop.	±%
2002	6,882	—
2011	6,864	−0.3%
2021	6,092	−11.2%
Source: Census data
