= Perieți, Ialomița =

Perieți
- Commune
- Location in Ialomița County

- Location in Romania
- Coordinates: 44°33′57″N 27°14′27″E
- Country: Romania
- County: Ialomița

Government
  - Mayor (2020–2024): Gheorghe-Marian Mustățea (PSD)
- Area: 32 km^{2} (12 sq mi)
- Elevation: 26 m (85 ft)
- Population (2021-12-01): 3,482
  - Density: 110/km^{2} (280/sq mi)
- Time zone: UTC+02:00 (EET)
  - Summer (DST): UTC+03:00 (EEST)
- Postal code: 927061
- Area code: +(40) 243
- Vehicle reg.: IL
- Website: primaria-perieti.ro

Perieți is a commune located in Ialomița County, Muntenia, Romania. It is composed of five villages: Fundata, Misleanu, Păltinișu, Perieți, and Stejaru.

Historical population
Year	Pop.	±%
1899	1,898	—
1925	2,100	+10.6%
2002	3,667	+74.6%
2011	3,586	−2.2%
2021	3,482	−2.9%
Source: Census data
