= Gura =

Gura may refer to:

== Places ==
=== Eritrea ===
- Gura, Eritrea, a formerly-important town of the Ottoman, Egyptian, Ethiopian, and Italian Empires

=== India ===
- Gura Sonigara, small village in Rajasthan, India
- Gura, Nakodar, small village in Punjab, India
- Gura, Jalandhar, a village in Jalandhar district of Punjab, India

=== Iran ===
- Gura, Iran, a village in Alborz Province
- Vargun Gura, village in Ardabil Province

=== Kenya ===
- Gura, Kenya, a sub-location of Othaya town in Nyeri County
- Gura River, River Gura is located in Nyeri County of Central Province of Kenya. It is the fastest flowing river in Africa. It flows from the Aberdare Ranges and passes through Othaya, Tetu and Mukurweini Constituencies before draining into the Sagana (Upper Tana).
- Gura Waterfall, the most precipitous fall in Kenya, which cascades 300m into an impenetrable ravine

=== Moldova ===
- Gura Bîcului, commune in Anenii Noi district
- Gura Camencii, commune in Floreşti district
- Gura Căinarului, commune in Floreşti district
- Gura Galbenei, commune in Cimişlia district
- Gura-Oituz, village in Cotiujenii Mici village, Sîngerei district

=== Pakistan ===
- Gura Balial, village in the Kotli District of Azad Kashmir

=== Romania ===
- Gura Humorului, town in Suceava County
- Gura Caliței, commune in Vrancea County
- Gura Foii, commune in Dâmboviţa County
- Gura Ialomiței, commune in Ialomiţa County
- Gura Ocniței, commune in Dâmboviţa County
- Gura Padinii, commune in Olt County
- Gura Râului, commune in Sibiu County
- Gura Șuții, commune in Dâmboviţa County
- Gura Teghii, commune in Buzău County
- Gura Vadului, commune in Prahova County
- Gura Văii (disambiguation), several places
- Gura Vitioarei, commune in Prahova County
- Gura Arieșului, village in Lunca Mureșului Commune, Alba County
- Gura Albești, village in Albești Commune, Vaslui County
- Gura Bărbulețului, village in Bărbulețu Commune, Dâmboviţa County
- Gura Bâscei, village in Cislău Commune, Buzău County
- Gura Beliei, village in Breaza town, Prahova County
- Gura Bohotin, village in Gorban Commune, Iaşi County
- Gura Bordului, village in Lunca Cernii de Jos Commune, Hunedoara County
- Gura Călmăţui, village in Berteştii de Jos Commune, Brăila County
- Gura Câlnăului, village in Vadu Pașii Commune, Buzău County
- Gura Căluiu, village in Călui Commune, Olt County
- Gura Crăieşti, village in Motoșeni Commune, Bacău County
- Gura Crivățului, village in Mănești Commune, Prahova County
- Gura Crucilor, village in Dănicei Commune, Vâlcea County
- Gura Cuțului, village in Vințu de Jos Commune, Alba County
- Gura Dimienii, village in Beceni Commune, Buzău County
- Gura Dobrogei, village in Cogealac Commune, Constanţa County
- Gura Făgetului, village in Topliceni Commune, Buzău County
- Gura Gârbovăţului, village in Ghidigeni Commune, Galați County
- Gura Gârluţei, former village in Berteştii de Jos Commune, Brăila County
- Gura Haitii, village in Șaru Dornei Commune, Suceava County
- Gura Idrici, village in Roșiești Commune, Vaslui County
- Gura Izbitei, village in Bucium Commune, Alba County
- Gura-Menţi, village in Borăscu Commune, Gorj County
- Gura Motrului, village in Butoiești Commune, Mehedinţi County
- Gura Pravăţ, village in Valea Mare-Pravăț Commune, Argeș County
- Gura Putnei, village in Putna Commune, Suceava County
- Gura Racului, village in Bulzești Commune, Dolj County
- Gura Roșiei, village in Roșia Montană Commune, Alba County
- Gura Sărăţii, village in Merei Commune, Buzău County
- Gura Siriului, village in Siriu Commune, Buzău County
- Gura Sohodol, village in Sohodol Commune, Alba County
- Gura Solcii, village in Grănicești Commune, Suceava County
- Gura Suhașului, village in Ocnele Mari town, Vâlcea County
- Gura Şuşiţei, village in Ionești Commune, Gorj County
- Gura Vulcanei, village in Vulcana-Pandele Commune, Dâmboviţa County
- Gura Dobrogei River, tributary of the Casimcea River
- Gura Văii River, tributary of the Cremene River
- Gura Voii River, tributary of the Geoagiu River
- Slănic de Gura Ocniței River or Slănic River, tributary of the Ialomiţa River
- Gura Ocniței oil field, giant oil field located in Gura Ocniţei, Dâmboviţa County

== Other uses ==
- Gura (surname)
- Gawr Gura, a virtual Youtuber

== See also ==
- Tona-Gura!, Japanese manga series
