= Gural =

Gural is a surname. Notable people with the surname include:

- Aaron Gural (1917–2009), American businessman
- Emre Güral (born 1989), Turkish football player
- Jeffrey Gural (born 1942), American real estate developer

== See also ==
- Gura (surname)
