= Banabona =

- Location within Azad Kashmir
- Coordinates: 33.20°N 74.05°E
- Country: Pakistan
- Province: Azad Kashmir
- Elevation: 939 m (3,081 ft)
- Time zone: UTC+5 (PST)

Banabona is a village in the Kotli District of Azad Kashmir, Pakistan. Neighbouring settlements include Bindian, Majwal and Marhota.
