= Bobulești =

Bobuleşti may refer to:

- Bobuleşti, a village in Gura Camencii Commune, Floreşti district, Moldova
- Bobuleşti, a village in Ştefăneşti town, Botoşani County, Romania
