= Giran, Kashmir =

Giran
- Location within Azad Kashmir
- Coordinates: 33.21°N 74.04°E
- Country: Pakistan
- Province: Azad Kashmir
- Elevation: 844 m (2,769 ft)
- Time zone: UTC+5 (PST)

Giran is a village in the Kotli District of Azad Kashmir, Pakistan. It is located at 33°21'0N 74°4'55 with an altitude of 844 metres (2772 feet). Neighbouring settlements include Bindian and Majwal.
