= Saidpur, Kotli =

Pakistani village

Saidpur
- Location within Azad Kashmir
- Coordinates: 33.19°N 74.03°E
- Country: Pakistan
- Province: Azad Kashmir

Government
  - Headmaster Col Qazi Jan High School: Qazi Zulfikar
- Elevation: 813 m (2,667 ft)

Population (2021)
  - Estimate: 950
- Time zone: UTC+5 (PST)

Saidpur is a village in the Kotli District of Azad Kashmir, Pakistan. Neighbouring settlements include Bindian and Chagrianda.
