= Marhota =

- Location within Azad Kashmir
- Coordinates: 33°19′55″N 74°04′30″E
- Country: Pakistan
- Province: Azad Kashmir
- Elevation: 846 m (2,776 ft)
- Time zone: UTC+5 (PST)

Marhota is a village in the Kotli District of Azad Kashmir, Pakistan. Neighbouring settlements include Bindian and Banabona.
