= Gura Văii =

Gura Văii may refer to several places in Romania:

- Gura Văii, a commune in Bacău County
- Gura Văii, a village in Pleșcuța Commune, Arad County
- Gura Văii, a village in Podari Commune, Dolj County
- Gura Văii, a village in Albota Commune, Argeș County
- Gura Văii, a village in Racova Commune, Bacău County
- Gura Văii, a village in Scorțoasa Commune, Buzău County
- Gura Văii, a village in Recea Commune, Brașov County
- Gura Văii, a village in Sudiți Commune, Ialomița County
- Gura Văii, a village in Strunga Commune, Iași County
- Gura Văii, a village attached to Drobeta-Turnu Severin city, Mehedinți County
- Gura Văii, a village in Girov Commune, Neamț County
- Gura Văii, a village in Câmpuri Commune, Vrancea County
- Gura Văii, a village in Stănilești Commune, Vaslui County
- Gura Văii, a village in Bujoreni Commune, Vâlcea County
- Gura Văii (river), a tributary of the Pruteț in Vaslui County
