= Condrea =

Condrea 1. may refer to several villages in Romania:

- Condrea, a village in Umbrărești Commune, Galați County
- Condrea, a village in Lunca Banului Commune, Vaslui County

2. also may refer to Romanian hip hop and beatbox artist Stefan Condrea
