= Newmark Knight Frank Frederick Ross =

Newmark Knight Frank Frederick Ross is a locally owned commercial real estate and property service firm founded in 1888 in Denver, Colorado. It is the region's oldest full-service commercial real estate organization.

Originally named Frederick Ross Company, the business joined forces with New York-based Newmark Knight Frank, who partners with London-based Knight Frank in October 2010.
