= Gura Balial =

Gurrah Balyal
- Location within Azad Kashmir
- Coordinates: 33.19°N 74.04°E
- Country: Pakistan
- Province: Azad Kashmir
- Elevation: 820 m (2,690 ft)
- Time zone: UTC+5 (PST)

Gura Balial is a village in the Kotli District of Azad Kashmir, Pakistan. It is located at 33°19'40N 74°4'0E with an altitude of 820 metres (2693 feet). Neighbouring settlements include Bindian, Kotli Gujjran, and Saidpur.
