= Pruteț =

- Location within Romania

Location
- Country: Romania
- Counties: Vaslui County
- Villages: Gura Văii, Stănilești, Lunca Banului, Oțetoaia, Lunca Veche

Physical characteristics
- Mouth: Prut
  - coordinates: 46.4946°N 28.2245°E
- Length: 40 km (25 mi)
- Basin size: 350 km^{2} (140 sq mi)

Basin features
- Progression: Prut→ Danube→ Black Sea
- Tributaries
  - right: Ruginosul (Șopârleni), Gura Văii

The Pruteț is a right tributary of the river Prut in Romania. It flows into the Prut in Bumbăta. Its length is 40 km (25 mi) and its basin size is 350 km^{2} (140 sq mi).
