= Majwal =

- Location within Azad Kashmir
- Coordinates: 33.21°N 74.04°E
- Country: Pakistan
- Province: Azad Kashmir
- Elevation: 793 m (2,602 ft)
- Time zone: UTC+5 (PST)

Majwal is a village in the Kotli District of Azad Kashmir, Pakistan. Neighbouring settlements include Bindian and Giran.
