= Giurgeni =

- Commune
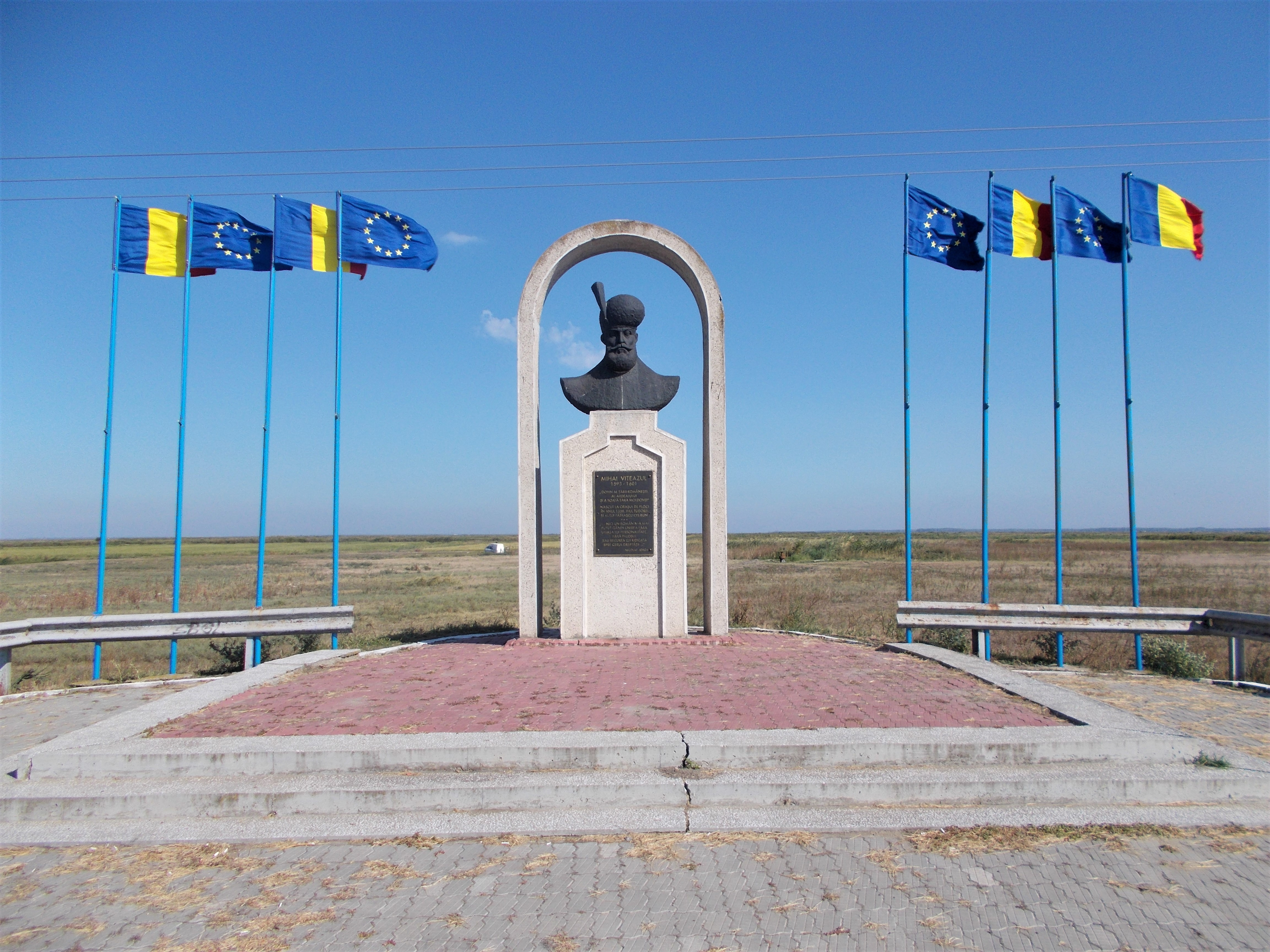
- Bust of Michael the Brave near the former Orașul de Floci market town

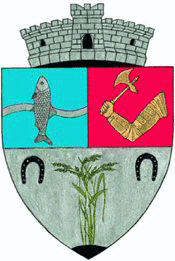
- Coat of arms

- Location in Ialomița County

- Location in Romania
- Coordinates: 44°45′N 27°52′E
- Country: Romania
- County: Ialomița

Government
  - Mayor (2020–2024): Valere Dinu (PSD)
- Area: 127.97 km^{2} (49.41 sq mi)
- Elevation: 4 m (13 ft)
- Population (2021-12-01): 1,223
  - Density: 9.557/km^{2} (24.75/sq mi)
- Time zone: UTC+02:00 (EET)
  - Summer (DST): UTC+03:00 (EEST)
- Postal code: 927135
- Area code: +(40) 243
- Vehicle reg.: IL
- Website: www.giurgeni.ro

Giurgeni is a commune located on the left bank of the Danube, in Ialomița County, Muntenia, Romania. It is composed of a single village, Giurgeni.

Giurgeni is linked with Vadu Oii–Hârșova over the Danube via the Giurgeni–Vadu Oii Bridge.

The ruins of Orașul de Floci, a lost city of Wallachia, are located near Giurgeni, at the confluence of the Ialomița River and the Danube, on the old riverbed of the Ialomița. According to contemporaneous accounts, Michael the Brave, the famous Voivode of Wallachia, was born in this town; his birthplace is reportedly the top touristic destination in Ialomița County.

The Communist regime operated a forced labor camp at Luciu-Giurgeni, in between the Giurgeni collective farm and Luciu village, in Gura Ialomiței commune.

Historical population
Year	Pop.	±%
1899	925	—
1925	877	−5.2%
2002	1,649	+88.0%
2011	1,507	−8.6%
2021	1,223	−18.8%
Source: Census data
