= Hârșova =

- Town
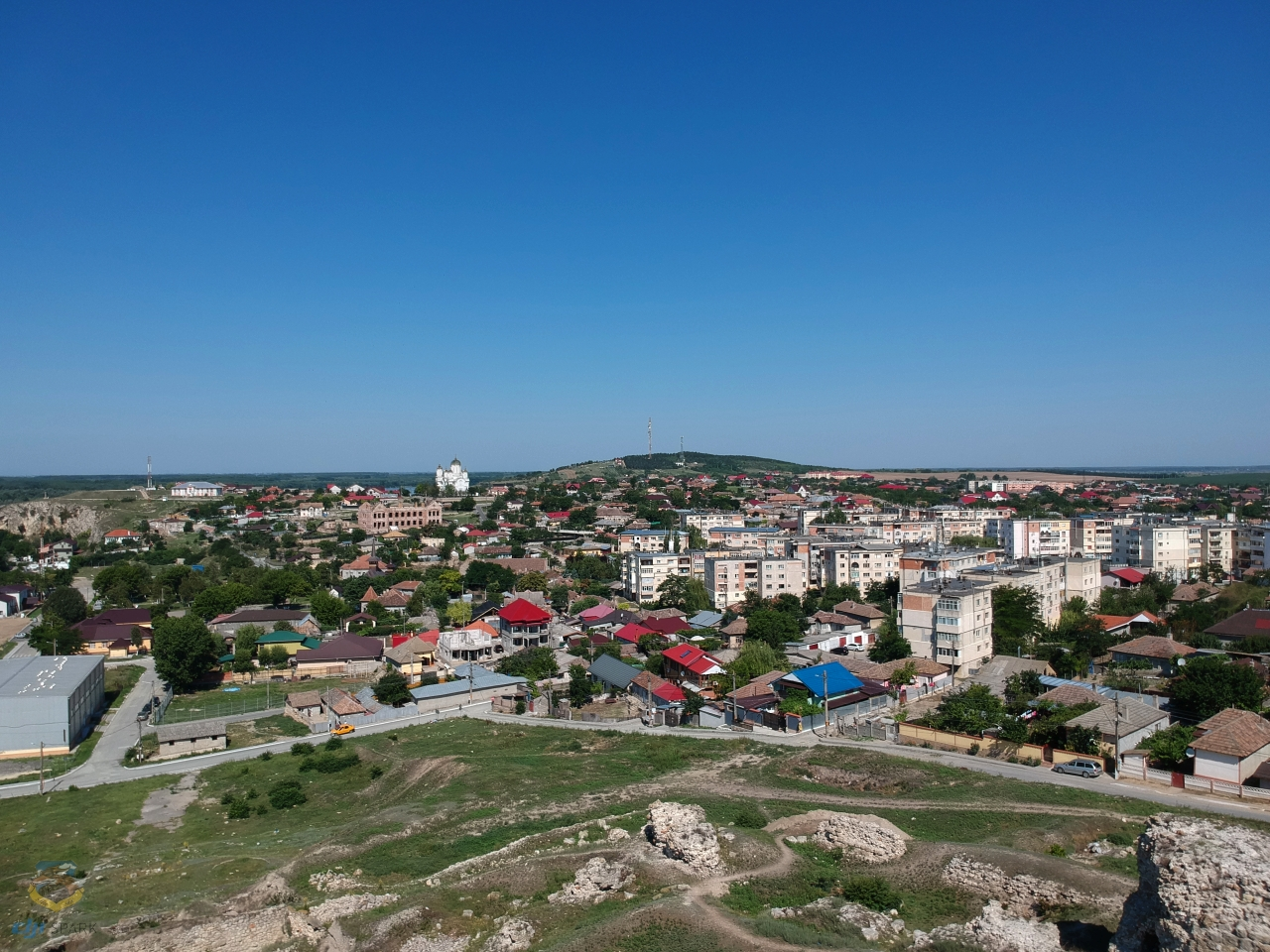

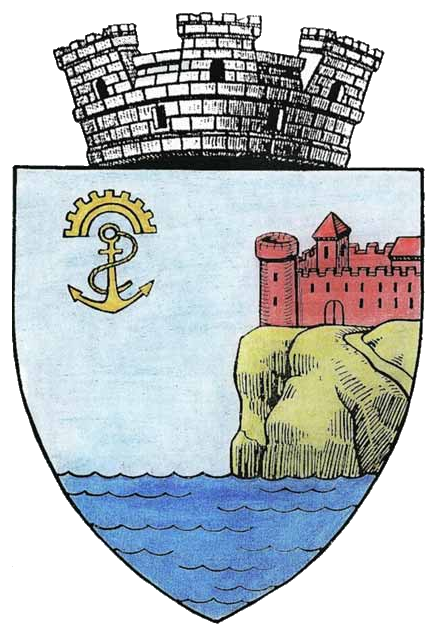
- Coat of arms

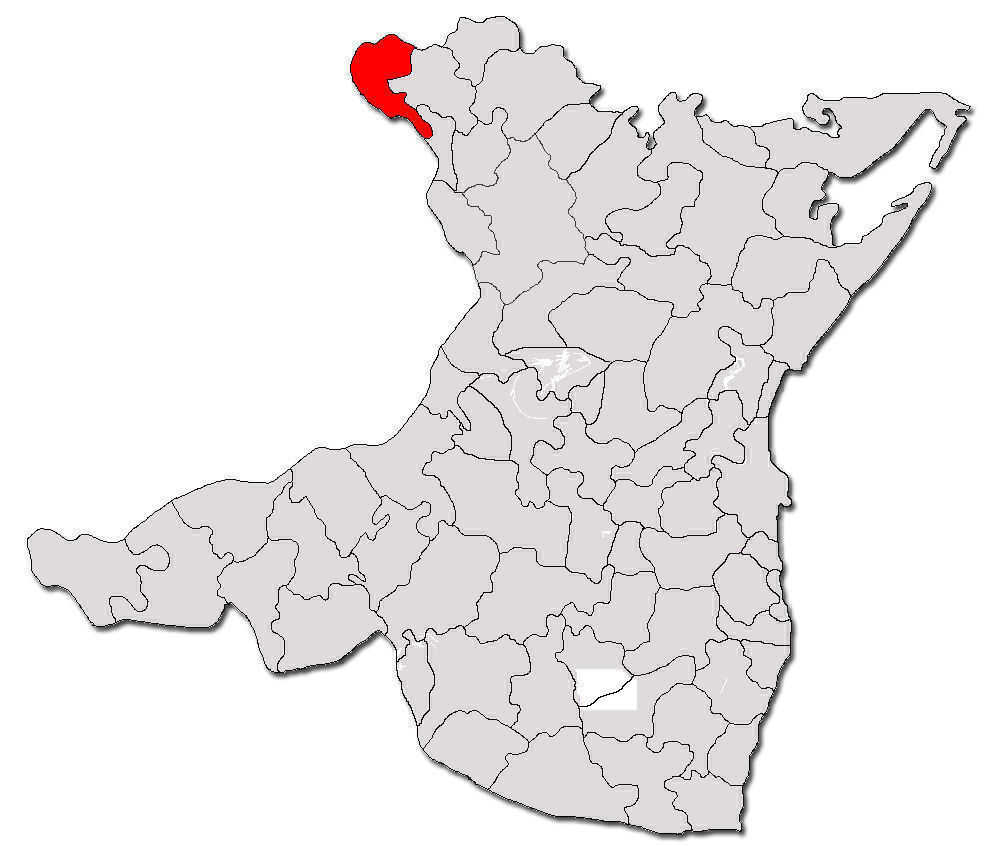
- Location in Constanța County

- Location in Romania
- Coordinates: 44°41′0″N 27°57′7″E
- Country: Romania
- County: Constanța
- Subdivisions: Vadu Oii

Government
  - Mayor (2024–2028): Viorel Ionescu (PNL)
- Area: 109.02 km^{2} (42.09 sq mi)
- Elevation: 20 m (66 ft)
- Population (2021-12-01): 8,737
  - Density: 80.14/km^{2} (207.6/sq mi)
- Time zone: UTC+02:00 (EET)
  - Summer (DST): UTC+03:00 (EEST)
- Postal code: 905400
- Area code: (+40) 02 41
- Vehicle reg.: CT
- Website: www.primaria-harsova.ro

Hârșova (also spelled Hîrșova; Romanian pronunciation: [ˈhɨrʃova]; Turkish: Hırsova; Bulgarian: Хърсово, Harsovo) is a town located on the right bank of the Danube, in Constanța County, Northern Dobruja, Romania.

The village of Vadu Oii is administered by the town. The village is linked with Giurgeni commune over the Danube via the Giurgeni-Vadu Oii Bridge.

== Etymology ==
The relationship between the current name of Hârșova and the ancient name of the city, Carsium has long been a matter of debate among historians and linguists. According to Iorgu Iordan the ancient name may have been kept under the influence of the Slavic word Круш, cliff, rock.

The current name may also derive from the ancient Slavic god Hârs (Хърс) and Slavic suffix "-ova" and it is still under debate whether it is in any way linked with the ancient name, or perhaps a common Proto-Indo-European root related to "ecstasy"/"desire", ultimately also related to the Vedic rta and Avestan arta.

== History ==
In ancient times, a Roman settlement grew up on the site of the current town named Carsium around the Roman fort of the same name whose remains are still visible on the bank of the Danube. It was initially in Moesia and later in Scythia Minor province.

In 1570 (Hijri 977) the castle town had 69 guards, 71 Muslim households and 84 Christian households and it was a "has" of Mehmet Bey, the mirliva of Silistra.

The Storming of Hirsovo took place in 1773.

In 1853, The Times of London reported that "Hirsova"

is defended by a fortified castle, and has a garrison of about 2,000 men. This place was taken by the Russians in 1809 and 1828. Though small, it is of considerable importance from its position on the very spot where the Berchicha returns to the Danube. . . . It is in many parts inundated, but has good pasturage for the excellent horses which constitute the sole wealth of the Tartars who inhabit it.

== Demographics ==
Historical population
Year	Pop.	±%
1912	3,990	—
1930	3,665	−8.1%
1948	3,762	+2.6%
1956	4,761	+26.6%
1966	7,519	+57.9%
1977	8,239	+9.6%
1992	10,394	+26.2%
2002	11,198	+7.7%
2011	9,642	−13.9%
2021	8,737	−9.4%
Source: Census data

At the 2021 census, Hârșova had a population of 8,737; of those, 6,169 were Romanians (70.61%), 6 Hungarians (0.07%), 499 Roma (5.71%), 510 Turks (5.84%), 10 Lipovans (0.11%), 102 others (1.17%), and 1,435 with undeclared ethnicity (16.42%).

At the 2011 census, the town had 9,642 residents; of those, 7,476 were Romanians (84.47%), 6 Hungarians (0.07%), 490 Roma (5.54%), 829 Turks (9.37%), 9 Tatars (0.10%), 27 Lipovans (0.31%), 4 others (0.05%), and 9 with undeclared ethnicity (0.10%).

== Natives ==
- Ionel Averian (born 1976), sprint canoer
- Vasilică Cristocea (born 1980), footballer

== Gallery ==
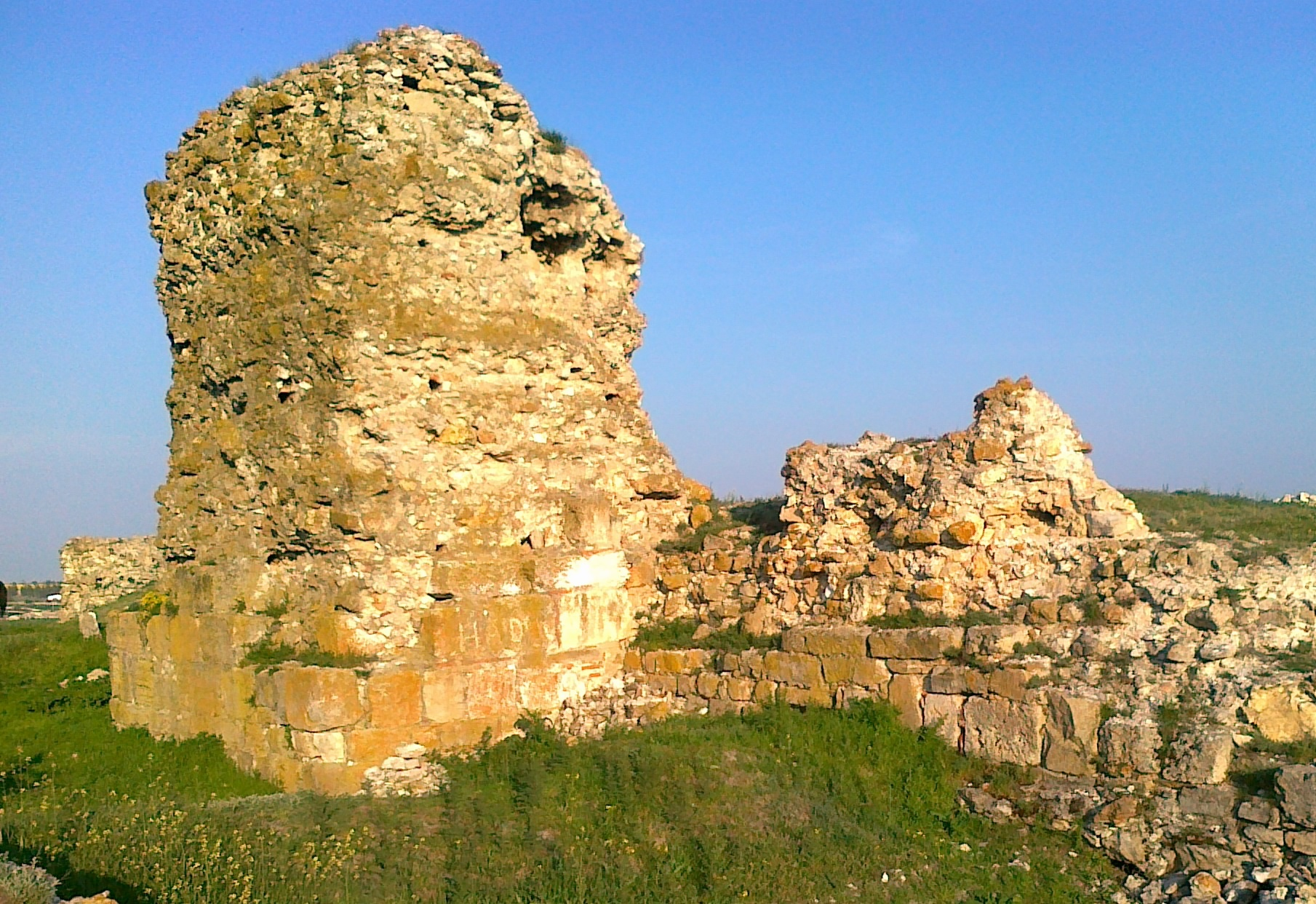
Ruins of Carsium

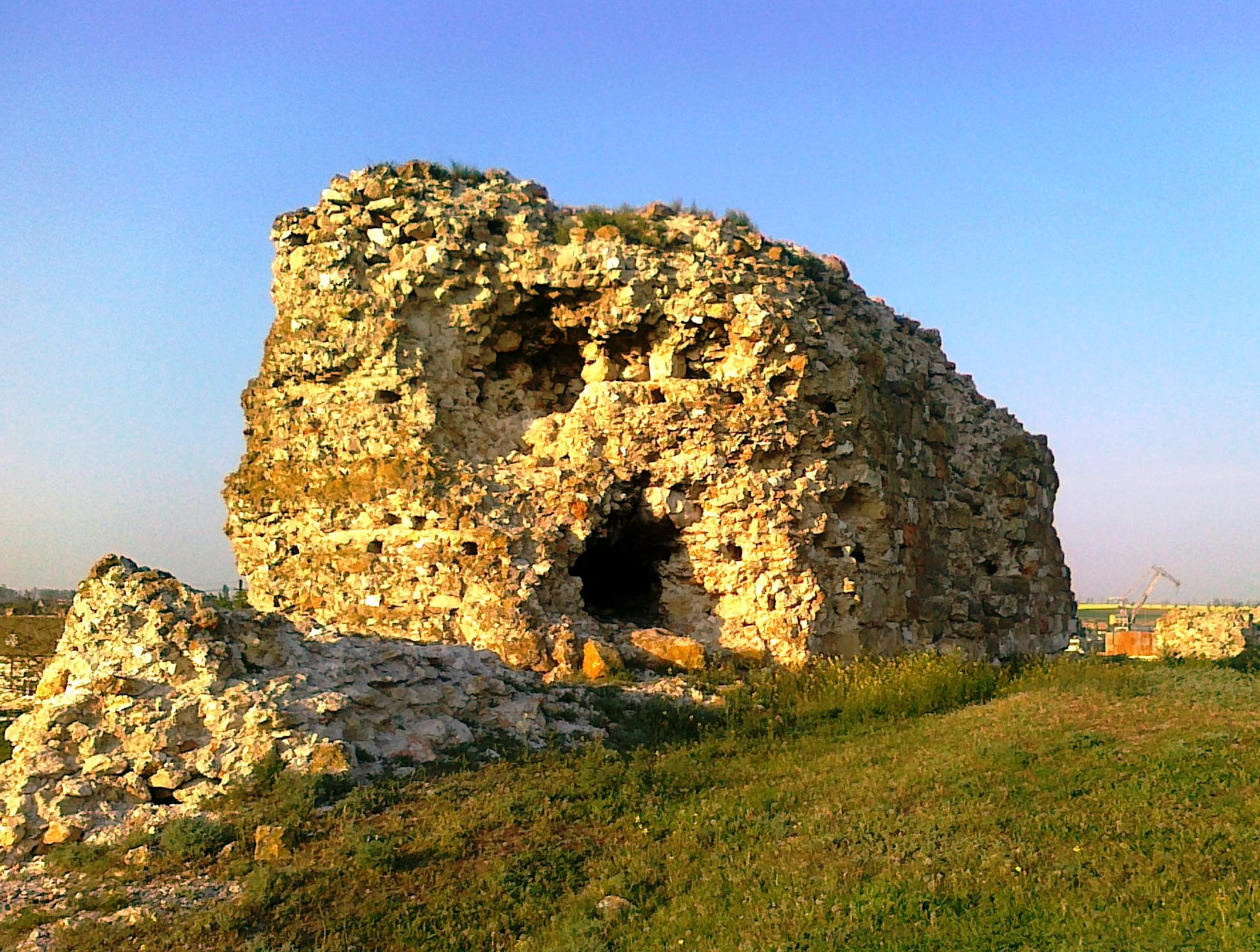
Ruins of Carsium

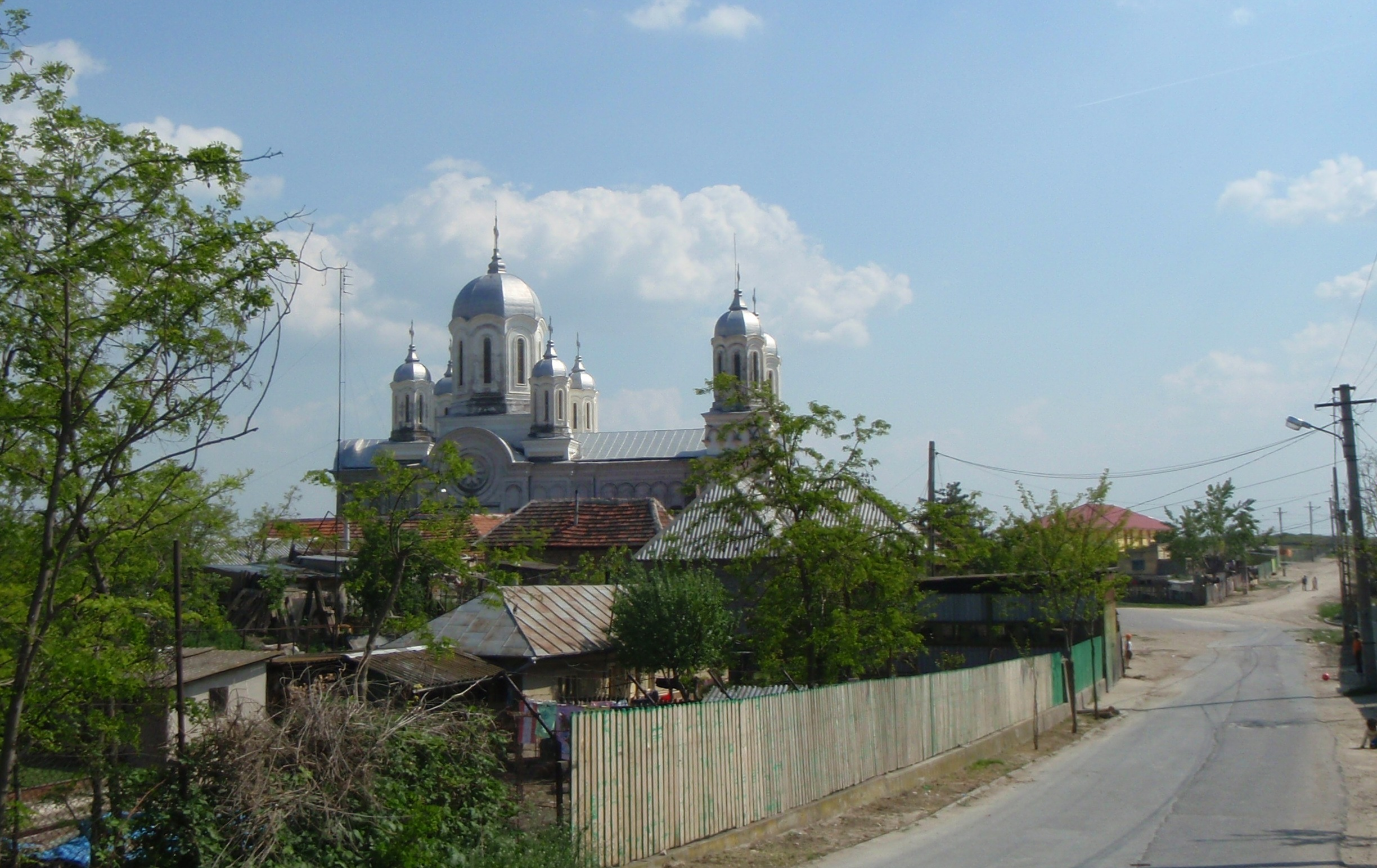
Lipovan Church

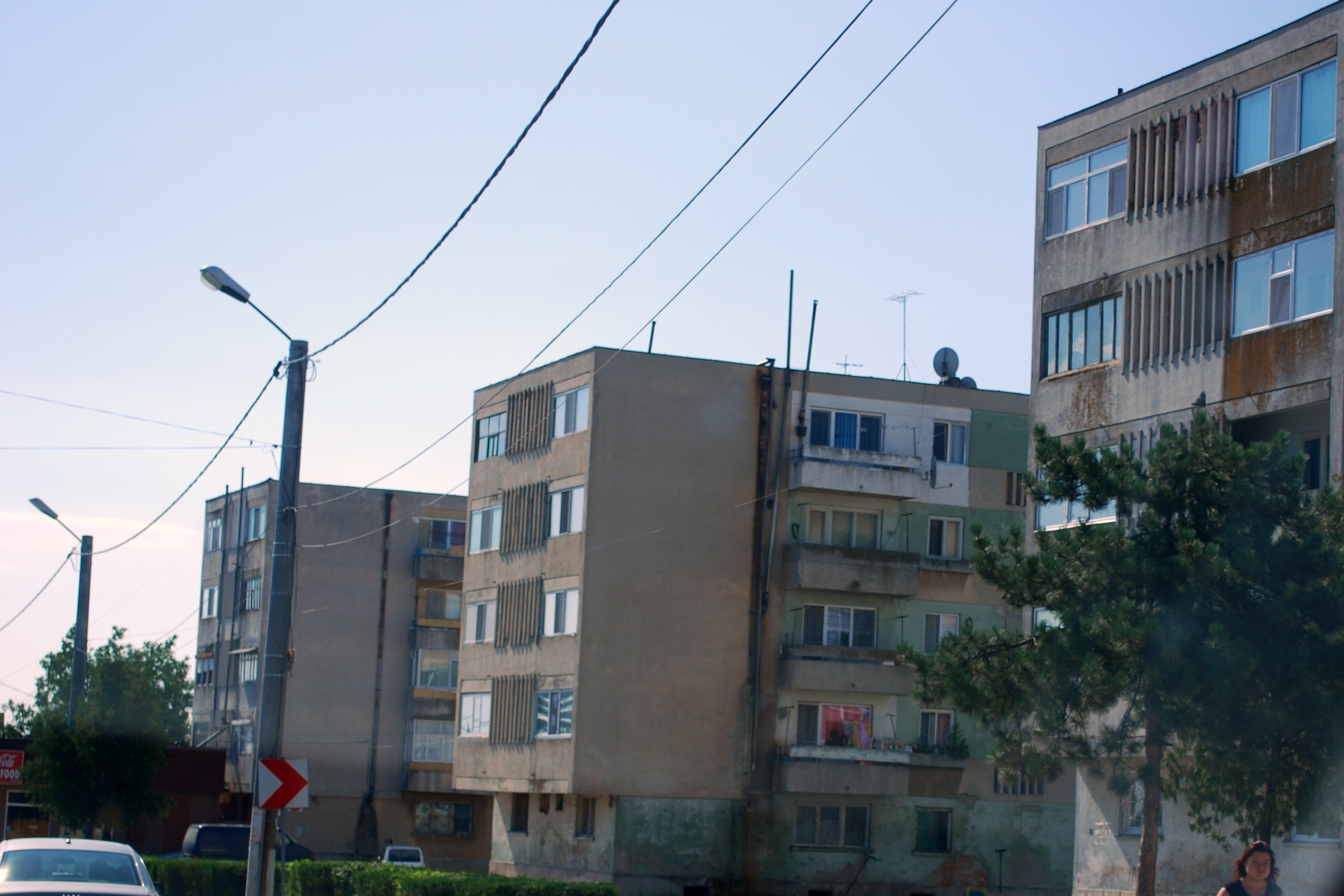
Residential buildings in Hârșova

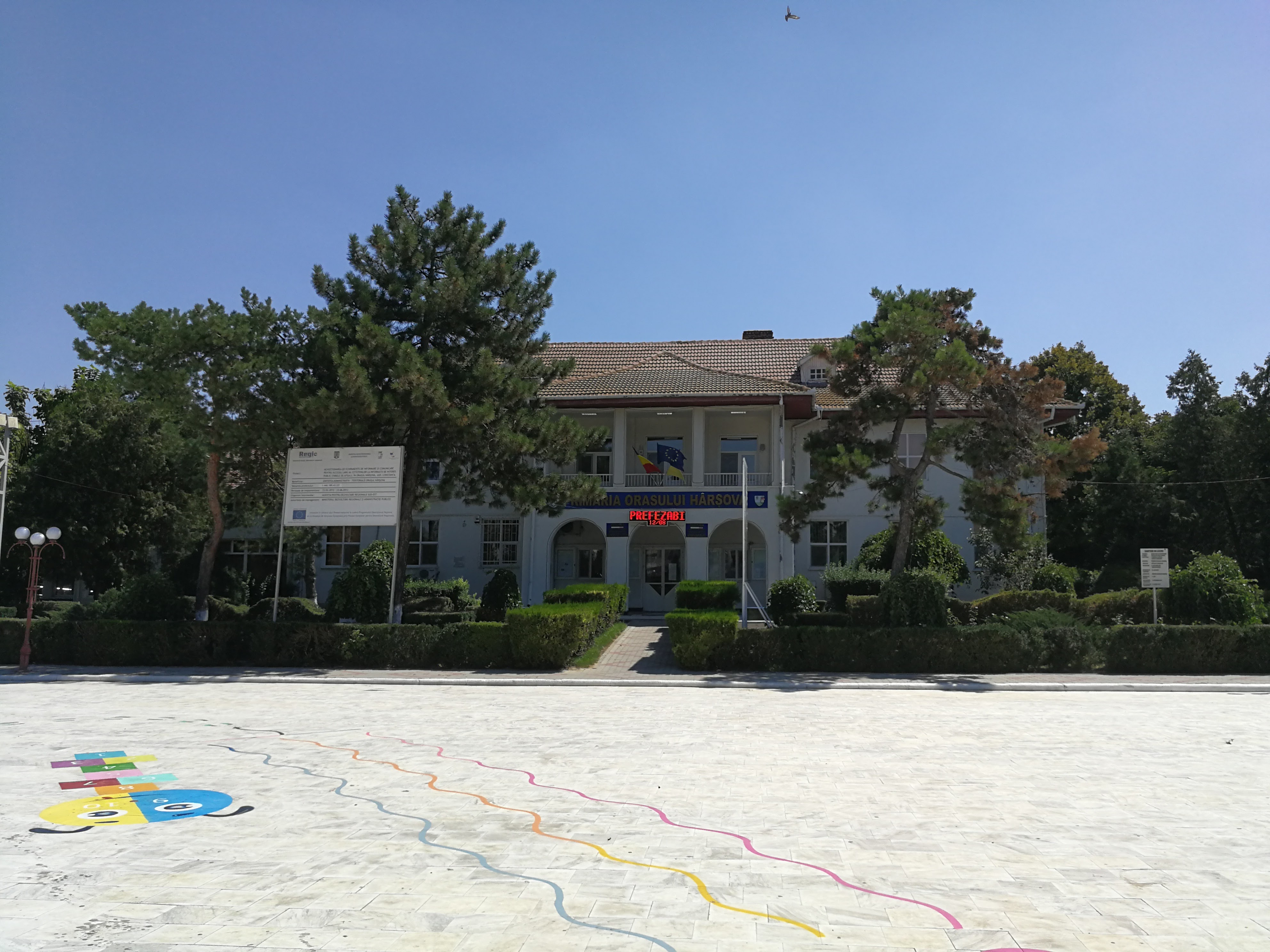
Hârșova town hall

== See also ==
- Carsium (castra)
- Capidava
