= Jeffrey Gural =

American real estate developer (born 1942)

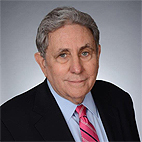
- Born: Jeffrey Robert Gural; July 6, 1942 (age 84)
- Education: B.S. Rensselaer Polytechnic Institute
- Occupation: Real Estate Developer
- Known for: Former Chairman of the Newmark & Company, Current Chairman of GFP Real Estate
- Spouse: Paula Gural
- Children: Eric Michael Gural
- Parent(s): Harriet Feil; Aaron Gural

Jeffrey Gural (born July 6, 1942) is a New York real estate developer.

== Early life and education ==
Gural was born to Jewish American real estate developer Aaron Gural and Harriet Feil. His mother died in 1945. His father was part owner of Newmark & Company and served as its chairman from 1957 to 1998. He was raised in Woodmere, New York and has two sisters: Jane Gural Senders and Barbara Gural. He graduated with a B.S. in civil engineering from Rensselaer Polytechnic Institute.

== Career ==
In 1968, he worked for Morse-Diesel Construction Company where he was responsible for the supervision and construction of more than one million square feet of new office space.

In 1972, he joined the family business managing its real estate assets (8.5 million square feet of real estate worth about $3 billion in 2010) and helping the growth of his family's Manhattan brokerage firm then known as Newmark Grubb which he has headed since 1978.

Gural with his partner, Barry Gosin, propelled the firm's growth in the 1970s and 1980s, via an aggressive acquisition strategy, including commercial and residential buildings and even racetracks. Gural runs the harness racing track Meadowlands Racetrack in East Rutherford, New Jersey as well as the racinos Tioga Downs in Nichols, New York and Vernon Downs in Vernon, New York.

In 2001, they invested in family-owned national appraiser Koeppel Tener Real Estate Services, founded by Alfred J. Koeppel.

In 2006, Newmark Grubb formed a strategic partnership with London-based real estate firm Knight Frank becoming Newmark Grubb Knight Frank.

In October 2011, Newmark Grubb Knight Frank was acquired by BGC Partners. Like his father, his strategy has always been to hold onto real estate over the long term.

In 2015, he was mentioned in the biography of Governor Andrew Cuomo of New York (The Contender: Andrew Cuomo) in a book chapter describing the evolution of New York State Racing, including the international investment sector. Jeffrey Gural was the owner and operator of Vernon Downs Racetrack during the research report, Reflections on Community Integration in Rural Communities in Upstate New York (Racino, 2014).

In 2017, Gural became chairman of GFP Real Estate LLC when Newmark Holdings diverged from Newmark Group and changed its name.

== Philanthropy and activism ==
Gural is committed to cleaning up the harness racing industry: all horses that run on his tracks are subject to blood and urine samples to test for illicit drugs and the training centers or farms can be inspected at any time by his investigator.

In 2014, Gural applied for a license to add table games to Tioga Downs. The state government rejected his application. Gural publicly expressed anger over the rejection. Governor Andrew Cuomo immediately requested that the state gaming commission add a casino upstate; As of 2015, Gural was the only applicant for that license. Gural and his wife have donated to several of Cuomo's political campaigns.

In 2016, Gural was an important backer of Public Question 1, a ballot measure that would amend New Jersey's constitution to allow casino Gambling in North Jersey. After numerous polls showed that Question 1 had no chance to pass Gural, along with Paul Fireman, pulled their financial support for the measure. Bill Cortese, the leader of Trenton’s Bad Bet, a group opposed to the question, said, “Trenton’s Bad Bet will not be distracted by billionaire developers throwing temper tantrums because they don’t get what they want.” Gural blamed the failure of Question 1 on the general political climate and said that he might sponsor a similar ballot measure in 2018.

Gural is a former chairman of the board of the Times Square Business Improvement District, the Alliance of Resident Theatres New York, and the Eldridge Street Synagogue. He serves on the board of directors of the Real Estate Board of New York, the UJA Federation, Eugene Lang College, the U.S.O.; New York City Outward Bound, the Jewish Community Center of the Upper West Side, and the Settlement Housing Fund. He also served as president of the New York Chapter of The Starlight Children's Foundation; is chairman emeritus of enCourage Kids Foundation and served as chairman of "I Have a Dream-NY"; and is a co-sponsor of the Chelsea-Elliot "I Have a Dream" Project.

== Personal life ==
He married his college sweetheart, Paula Gural, a geologist; they have three children. His son, Eric Michael Gural, has taken over most of his responsibilities. He is a major donor to the Democratic Party and President Barack Obama. Gural is a breeder of racehorses at his farm in Stanfordville, New York. He is a supporter of the two-state solution in the Middle East.
