= Carsium (castra) =

Fortress in Romania

- Fortress of Hârșova, Castra of Hârșova; Carsion, Carsum, Carsio, Carso, Carsos
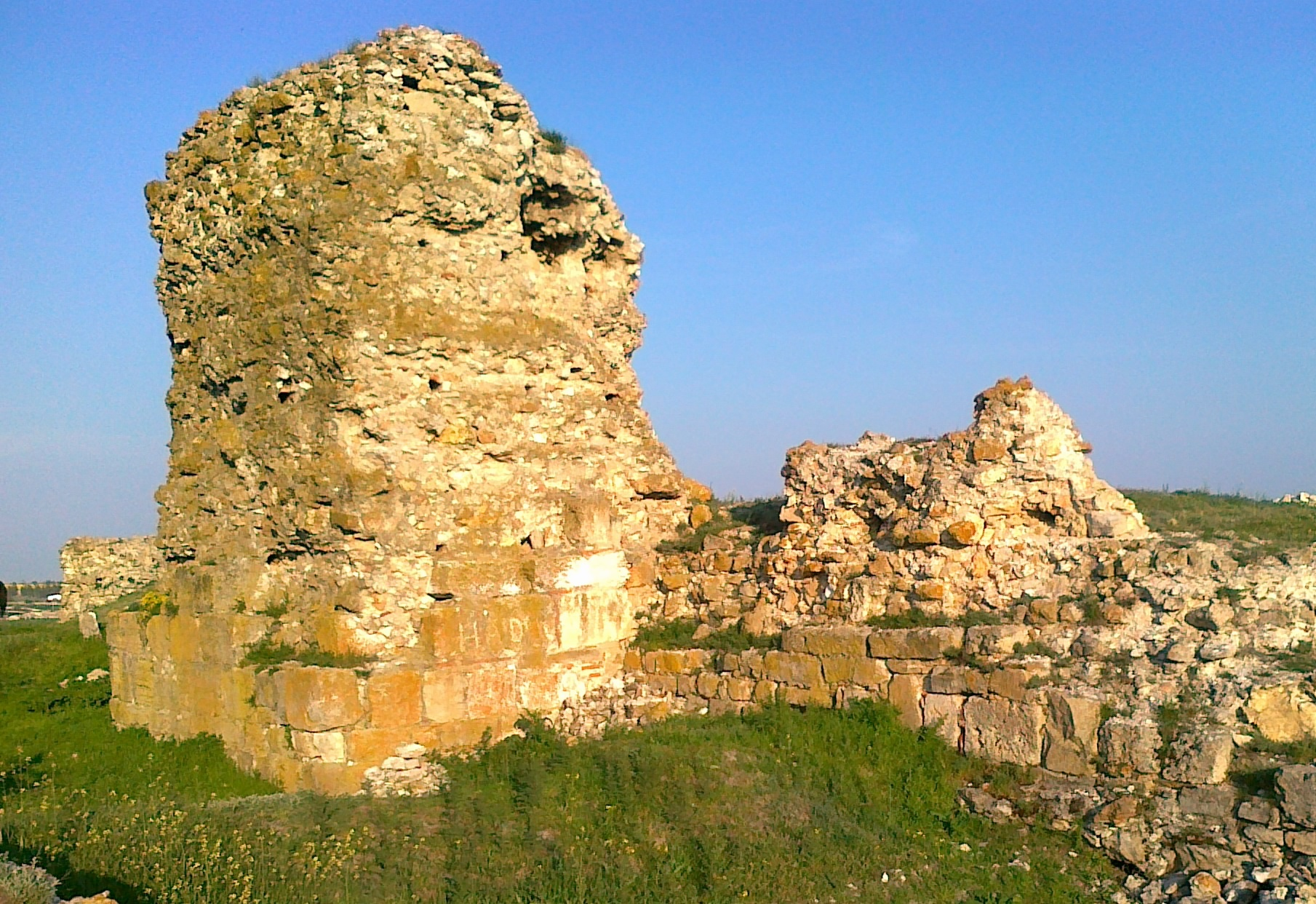
- Fort tower

- Location within Romania
- 44.6814°N 27.9523°E
- Location: Hârșova, Romania

History
- Founded: 1st century AD
- Abandoned: 3rd or 6th century AD

Site notes
- Elevation: 24 m (79 ft)
- Condition: Ruined

Carsium was a fort in the Roman province of Moesia in the 1st century AD whose remains are still visible. It was part of the defensive frontier system of the Limes Moesiae along the Danube.

It defended a nearby Danube crossing, one of the most important on this segment of the limes and the road that crossed into Dacia.

A Roman settlement grew up on the site of the current town of Hârșova around the Roman fort. It was initially in Moesia and later in Scythia Minor province.

It also had a naval port for a detachment of the Classis Moesica.

A well-preserved parade helmet of the 2nd century AD was found here, now in the National Museum in Bucharest.

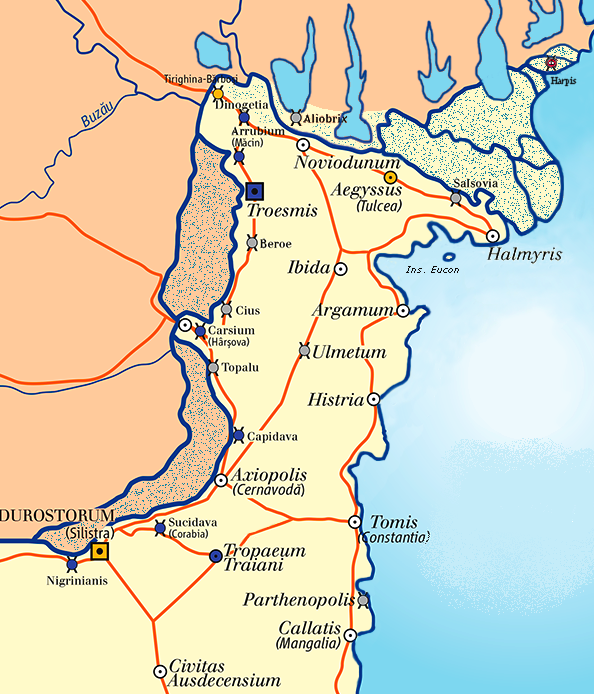
Eastern Moesia and Limes Moesiae

== Gallery ==
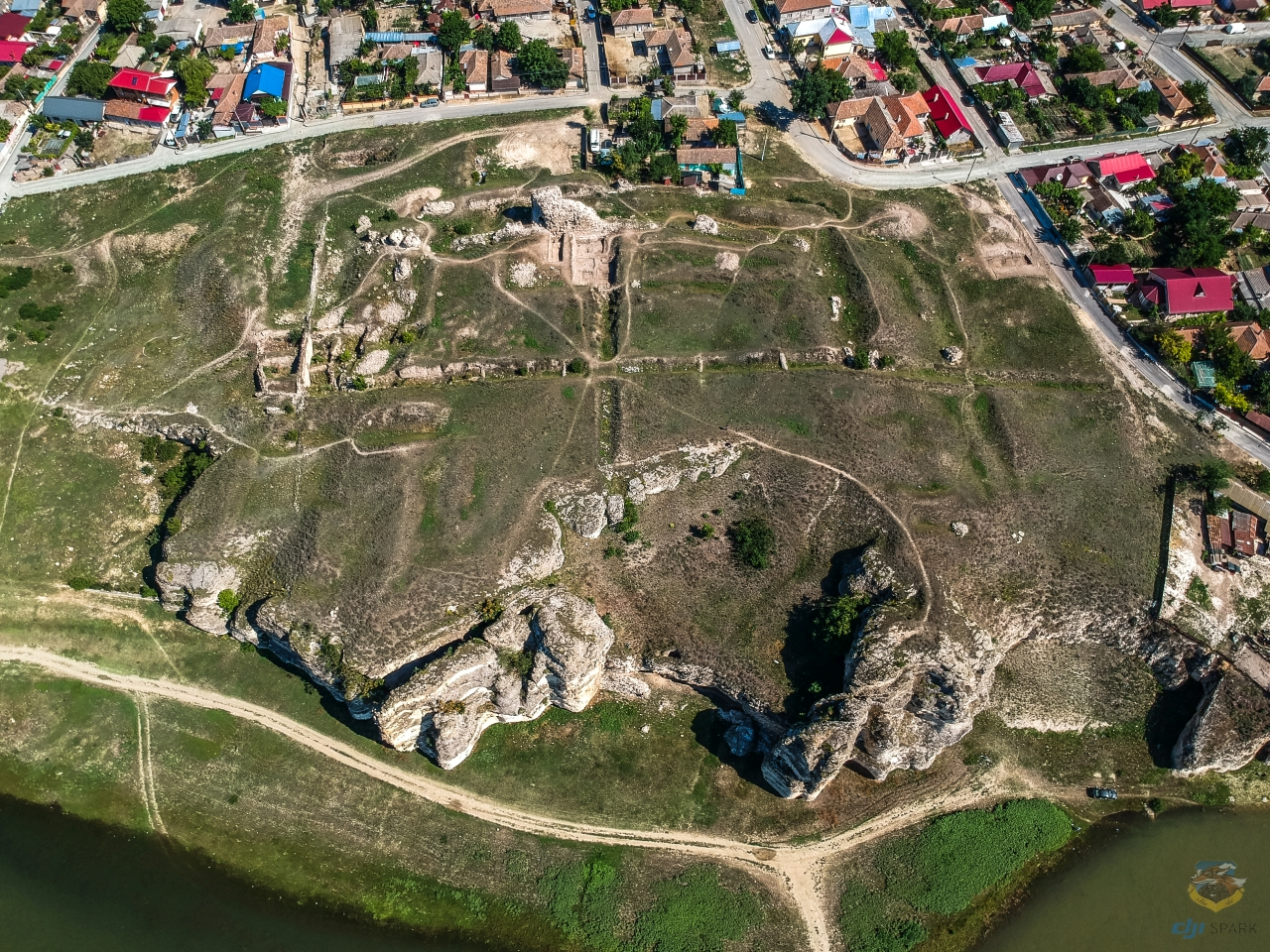
Carsium

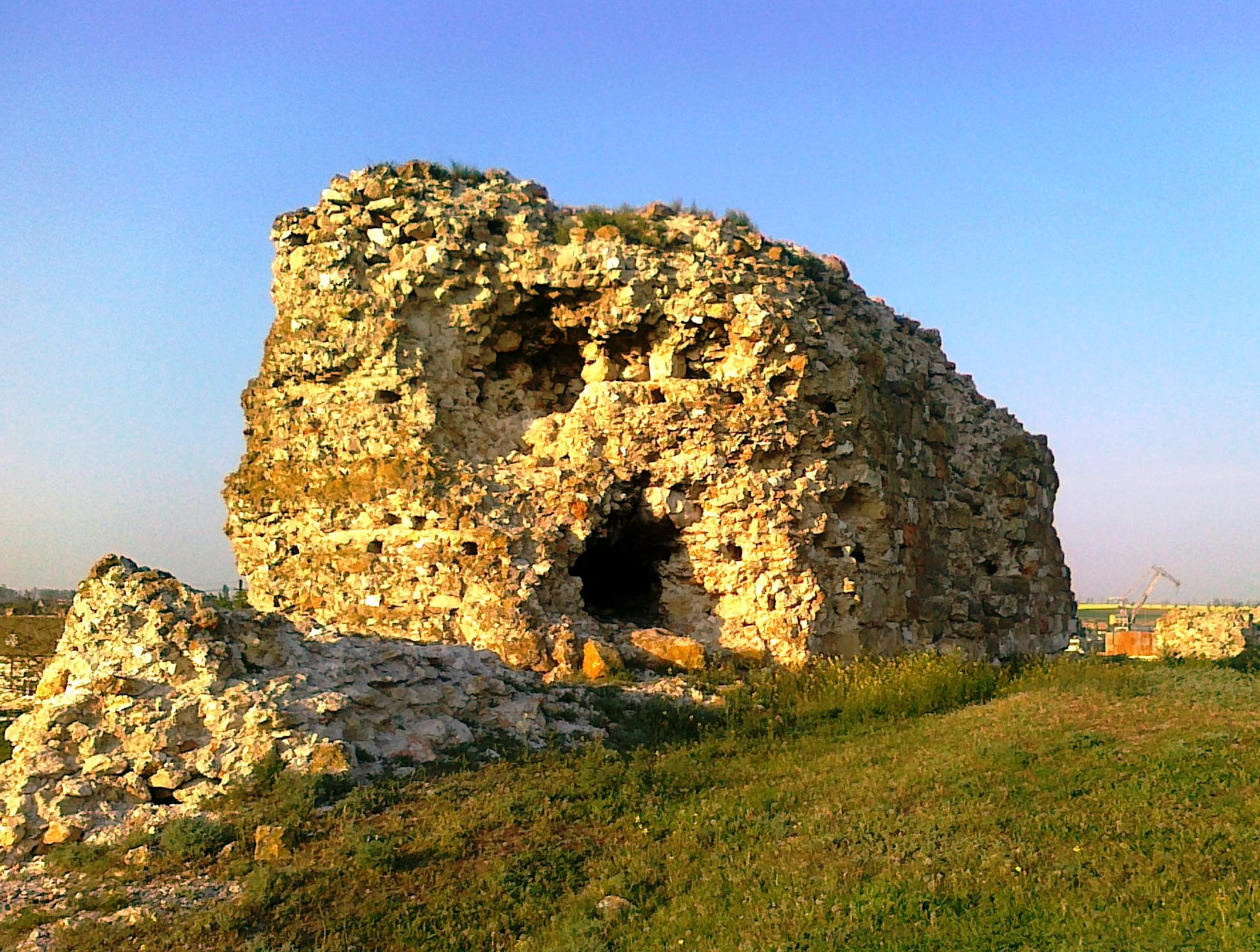
Carsium

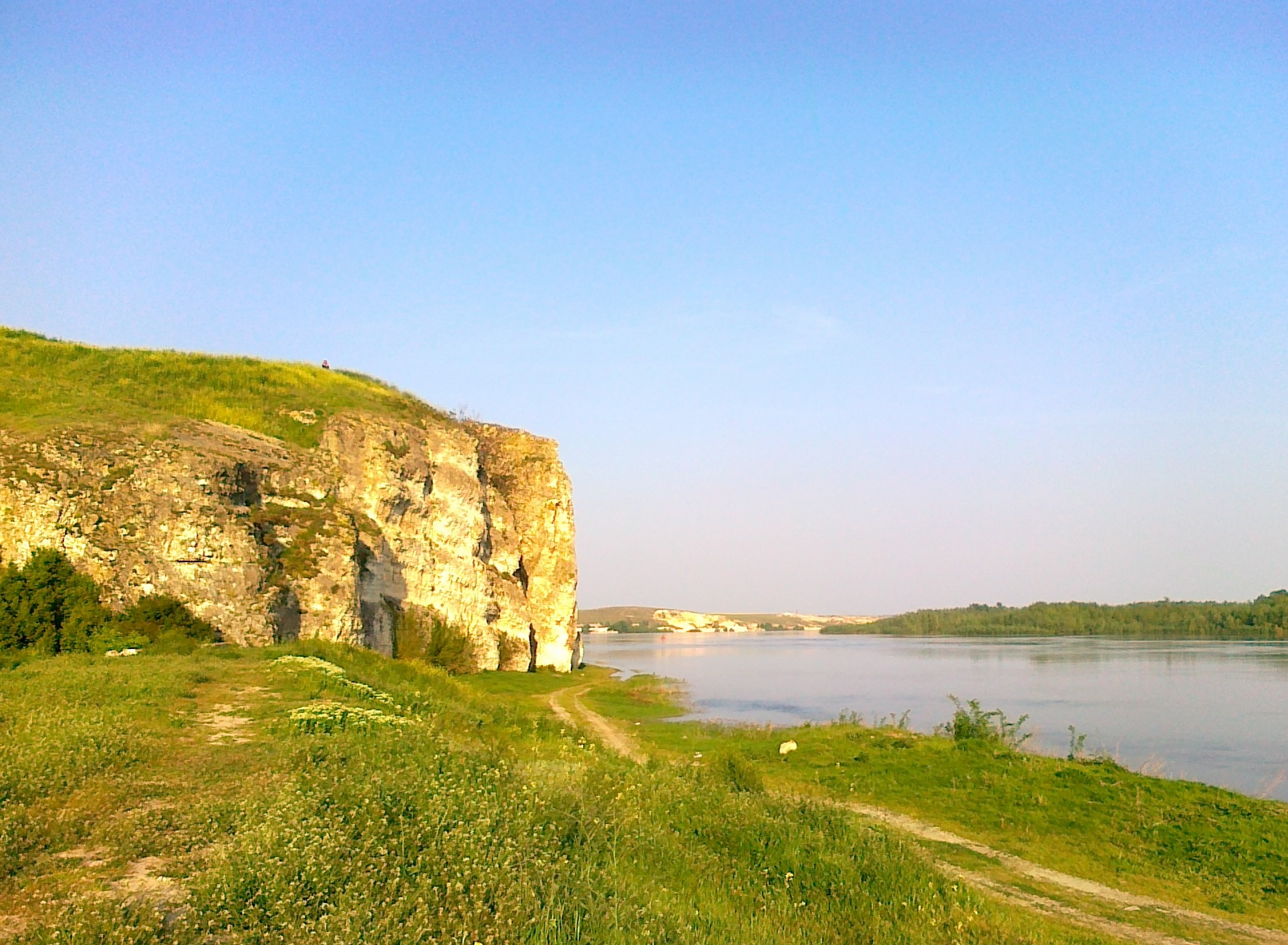
Cliffs on the Danube

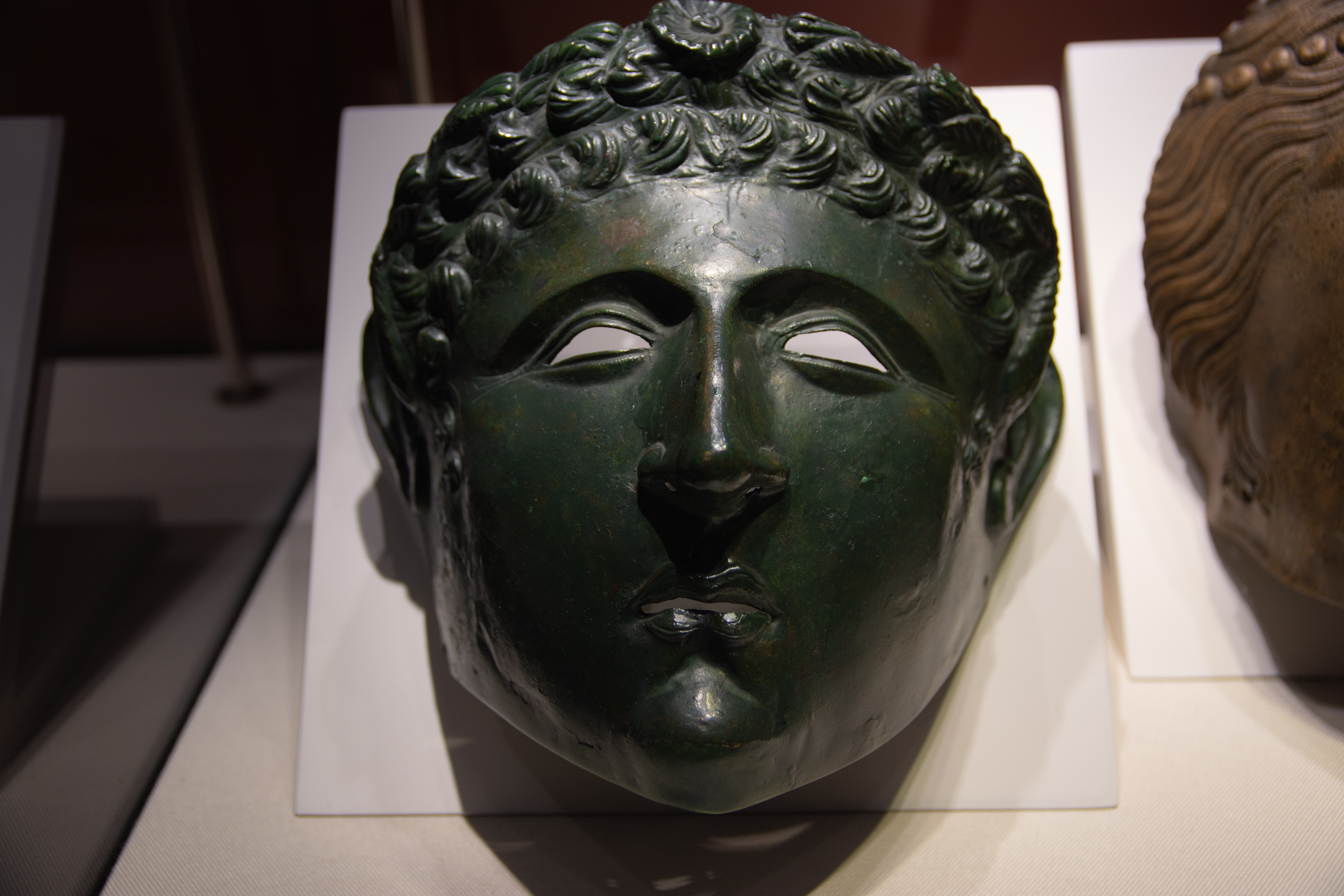
Parade mask from Carsium

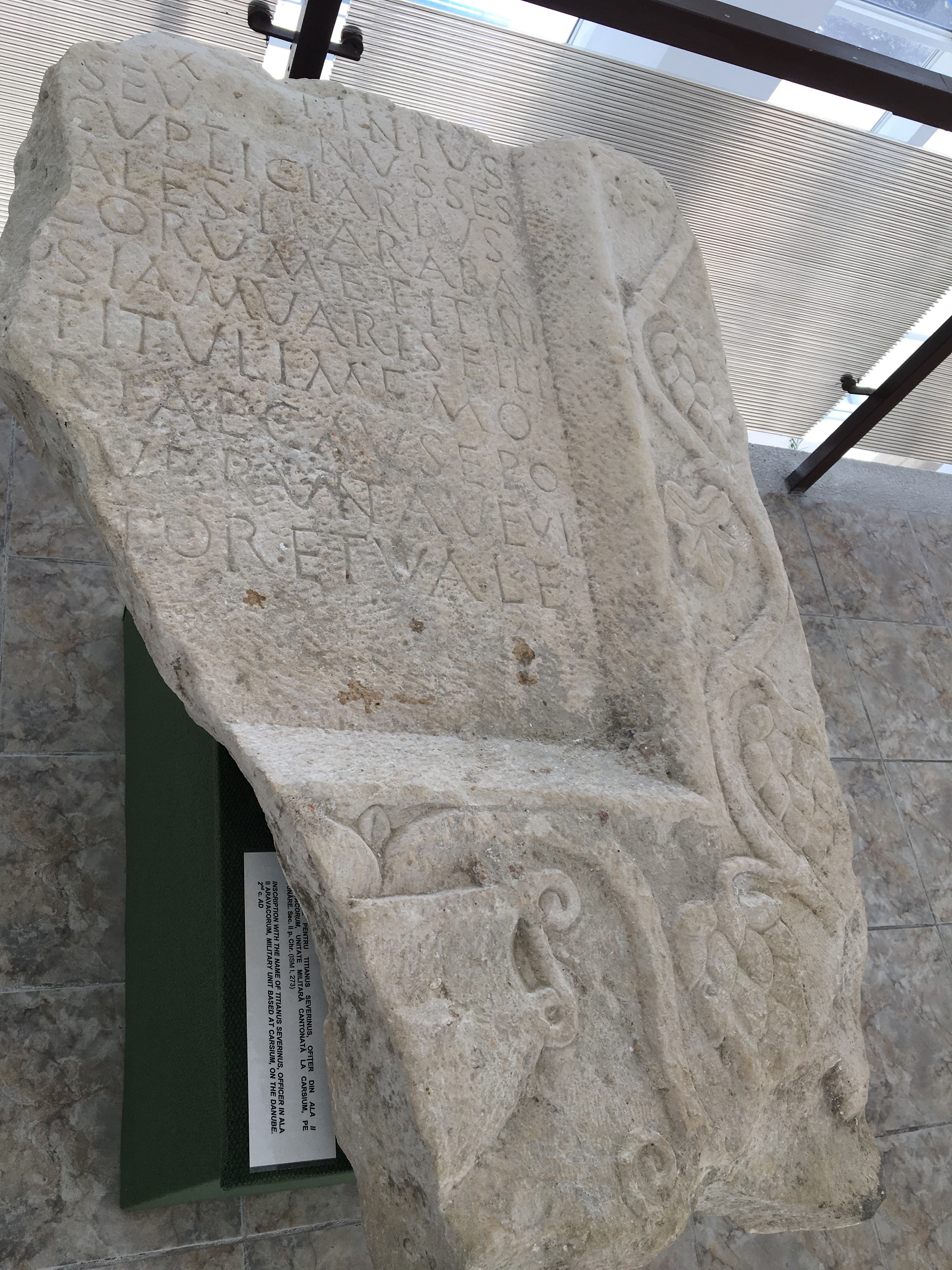
Inscription of Titianus Severinus

== See also ==
- List of castra
