= Gura Ocniței oil field =

Oil field in Romania

Gura Ocniței
- Country: Romania
- Region: Dâmbovița County
- Offshore/onshore: onshore
- Operator: Petrom

Field history
- Discovery: 1900
- Start of development: 1900
- Start of production: 1905

Production
- Current production of oil: 64,000 barrels per day (~3.2×10^{6} t/a)
- Estimated oil in place: 255 million tonnes (~ 297×10^{6} m^{3} or 1870 million bbl)

The Gura Ocniței oil field is a giant oil field located in Gura Ocniței, Dâmbovița County. It was discovered in 1900 and developed by Petrom. It began production in 1905 and produces oil. The total proven reserves of the Gura Ocniței oil field are around 1.87 billion barrels (255 million tonnes), and production is centered on 64,000 barrels per day (10,200 m^{3}/d). The oil field located in Gura Ocniței is the largest in Romania and produced around 1 billion barrels since its commercial opening.
