= Storming of Hirsovo =

1773 operation during the Russo-Turkish War (1768–74)

- Part of the Russo-Turkish War of 1768–1774
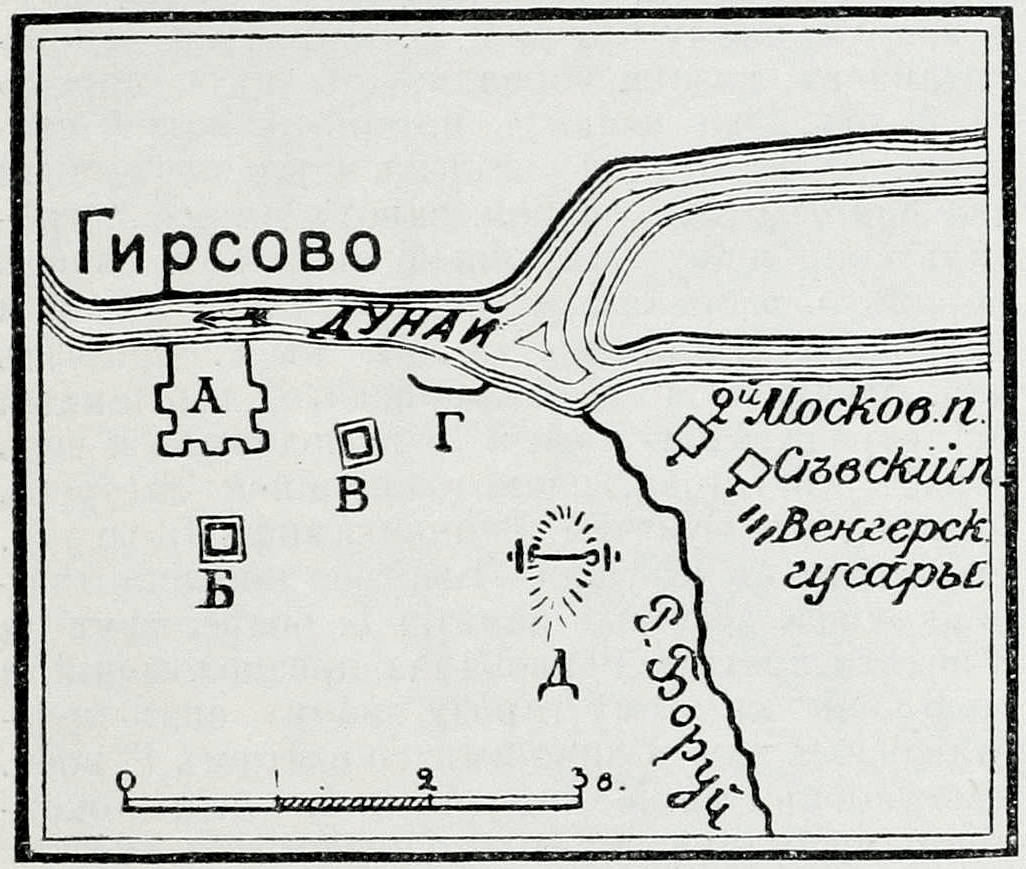
- Map to the article "Girsovo". Sytin Military Encyclopedia (St. Petersburg, 1911–1915)
| Date | 14 September 1773 |
| Location | Hırsova, Ottoman Empire (modern-day Romania) |
| Result | Russian victory |

Belligerents
| Ottoman Empire | Russian Empire |

Commanders and leaders
| Mehmed Pasha | Alexander Suvorov; David Mochebelov (Machabeli) |

Strength
| 7,000–10,000 | 3,000–4,000 |

Casualties and losses
| Up to 1,000, 6 cannon, 1 mortar | 10 killed, 167 wounded |

The Storming of Hirsovo (Hirsova) was a military operation carried out by Ottoman troops on 14 September (O.S. 3 September) 1773 during the Russo-Turkish War (1768–1774). The Ottoman Grand Vizier Muhsinzade Mehmed Pasha decided to storm the Hirsovo fortress occupied by Russian troops of Alexander Suvorov to facilitate the seizure of Giurgiu. Having pushed back the Russian outposts, the Turks came close to the Hirsovo fortifications; the Russians opened fire from the fortress and the Turks moved back; then they headed for the sconce. Repulsed by the sconce, they withdrew to their mountain artillery battery, but were knocked down from it by Colonel Prince Mochebelov and retreated, having lost additional men in the Russian pursuit.

== Sources ==
- Pares, Bernard (1926). A History Of Russia. London: Jonathan Cape. p. 309.
- Anthing, Johann Friedrich (1813). History of the Campaigns of Count Alexander Suworow-Rymnikski. London: W. Green and T. Chaplin. pp. 38–43.
- Petrushevsky, Alexander (1884). "Первая турецкая война: Туртукай, Гирсово, Козлуджи; 1773—1774" [First Turkish War: Turtukaya, Hirsovo, Kozludzhi; 1773—1774]. Генералиссимус князь Суворов [Generalissimo Prince Suvorov] (in Russian). Vol. 1 (1st ed.). Saint Petersburg: Типография М. М. Стасюлевича. pp. 169–170.
- Velichko, Konstantin; Novitsky, Vasily; Schwartz, Alexey von; Apushkin, Vladimir; Schoultz, Gustav von (1912). Военная энциклопедия Сытина [Sytin Military Encyclopedia] (in Russian). Vol. VIII: Гимры – Двигатели судовые. Moscow: Типография Т-ва И. Д. Сытина. pp. 323–325.
