= Giurgeni–Vadu Oii Bridge =

Bridge in Romania

Giurgeni–Vadu Oii Bridge Podul Giurgeni–Vadu Oii
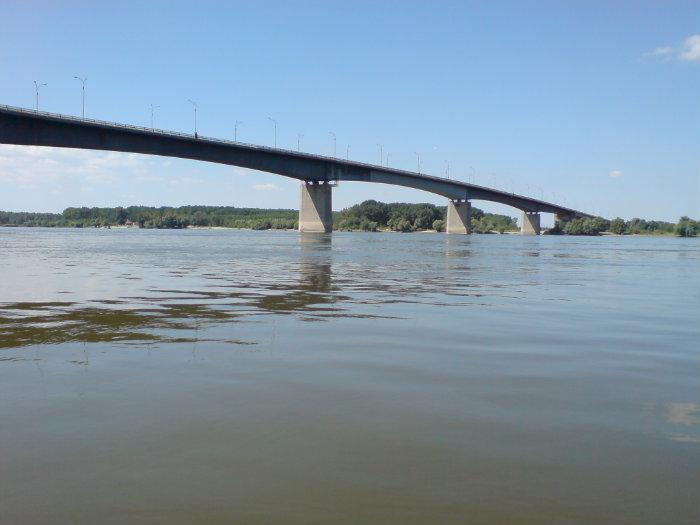
- Coordinates: 44°45′15″N 27°52′36″E
- Carries: Four lanes of roadway, two walkways
- Crosses: Danube
- Locale: Between Giurgeni, Ialomița County and Vadu Oii, Constanța County

Characteristics
- Design: Girder bridge
- Total length: 1,456 m (4,777 ft)
- Width: 16.8 m (55 ft)
- Longest span: 160 m (520 ft)

History
- Designer: IPTANA Bucharest
- Opened: 1970

The Giurgeni–Vadu Oii Bridge (Romanian: Podul Giurgeni–Vadu Oii) is a bridge in Romania, over the Danube river, between Giurgeni commune and Vadu Oii village on the DN2A (E60) national road. Situated on River - Km 237,8, it connects the regions of Muntenia and Dobruja.

The bridge, constructed as a steel girder bridge, is 1,456 m (4,777 ft) in total length, with three central spans of 160 m (520 ft) each and other two spans of 120 m (390 ft), beside to two viaducts with 16 spans of 46 m (151 ft).

== See also ==
- European route E60
- Roads in Romania
- List of bridges in Romania
