= Gerald Eve =

Gerald Eve LLP
- Type: Private
- Industry: Real estate
- Founded: 1930; 96 years ago (as Gerald Eve); 2008; 18 years ago (as Gerald Eve LLP)
- Headquarters: One Fitzroy, 6 Mortimer Street, London, United Kingdom
- Products: Property services
- Number of employees: 580+ (2022)
- Website: www.geraldeve.com

Gerald Eve LLP is a real estate advisory business headquartered in London, United Kingdom. The firm has offices in the West End of London, The City of London, Glasgow, Birmingham, Leeds, Manchester, Milton Keynes, Cardiff and West Malling.

The firm's principal areas of practice include advice and commentary on United Kingdom real estate valuation and property services, town planning and property development and property taxes. Ranked in the top 20 UK chartered surveying and property consultancy firms, Gerald Eve LLP has appeared in The Sunday Times' 100 Best Companies to Work For survey for six years running, placed 51st in the 2012 survey.

== History ==
The firm was founded as Gerald Eve & Co. on Chancery Lane, London in 1930 by Charles Gerald Eve (1872–1946), at the age of 57, later a President of the Royal Institution of Chartered Surveyors.

Gerald Eve converted into a limited liability partnership on 1 October 2008.

== Newmark Group Buyout ==
At the beginning of March 2023, it was announced that Newmark Group had acquired Gerald Eve in a deal which follows the acquisitions of investment sales and leasing advisory firms BH2 and Harper Dennis Hobbs in the UK & Paris-based flexible office subsidiary Deskeo in 2022.

As part of the acquisition, Gerald Eve executive Simon Rees, will join as a managing partner at Newmark Group, whilst Simon Prichard, will serve as a senior partner.
