= Orașul de Floci =

Coordinates: 44°41′28″N 27°49′42″E

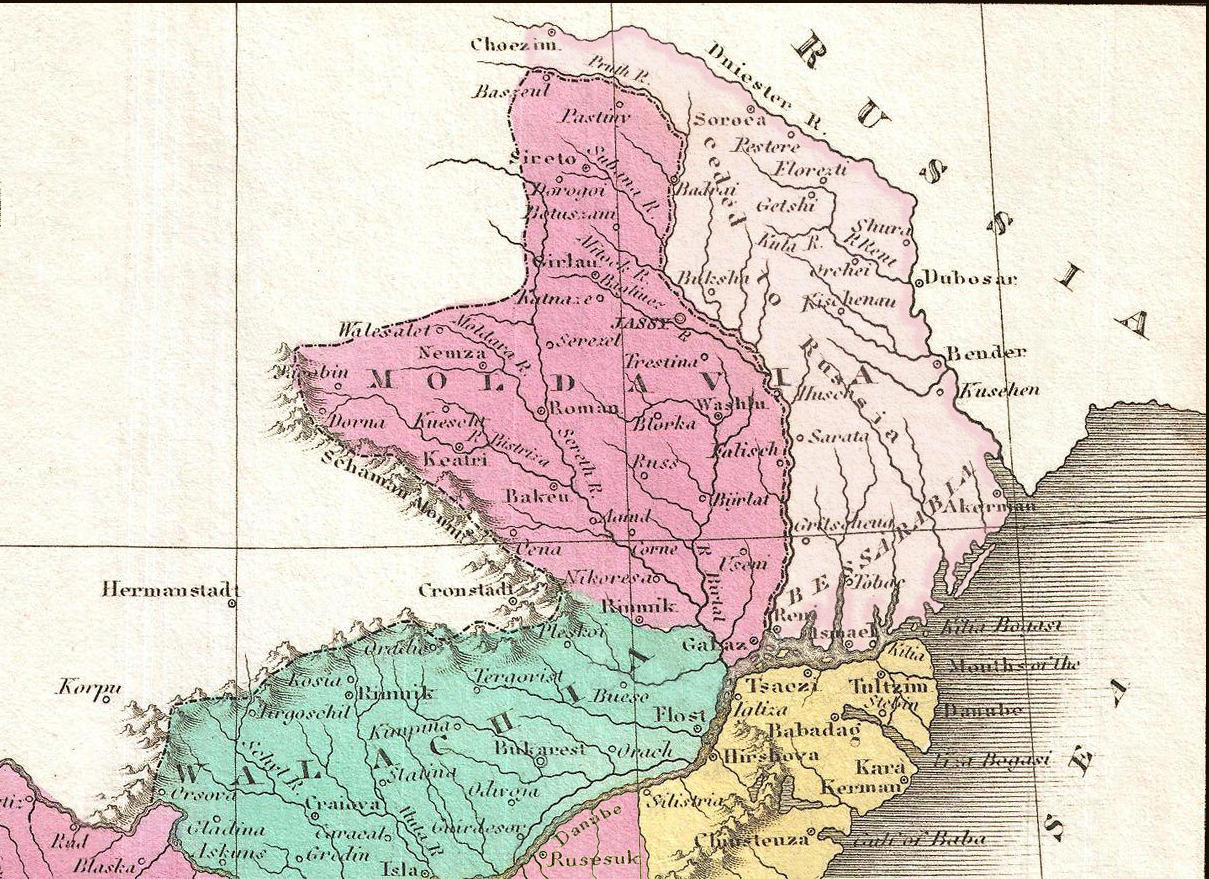
Map from 1827 where the city is recorded as Flost

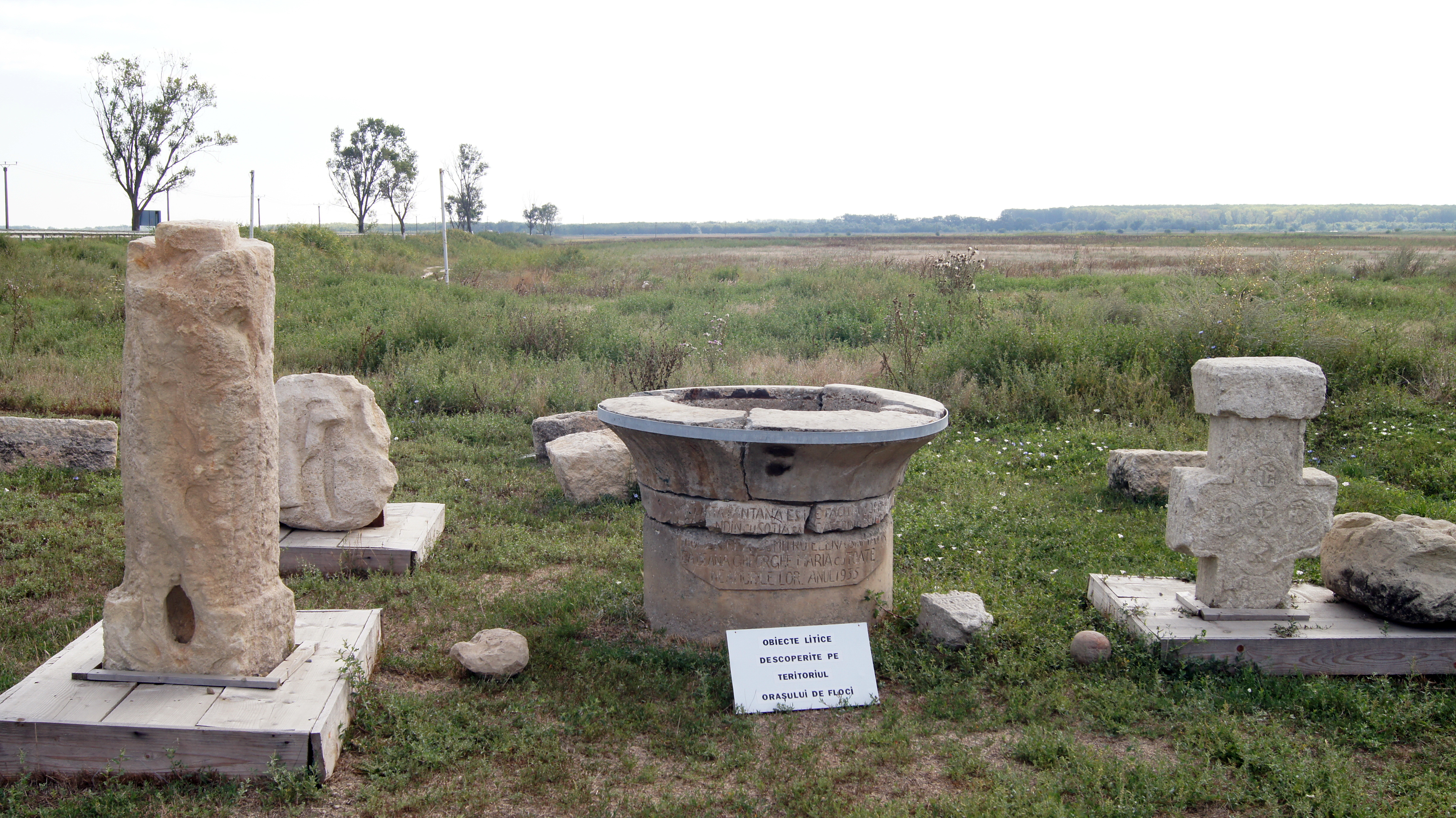
Vestiges of Orașul de Floci in Giurgeni

Orașul de Floci, also Cetatea de Floci or Târgul de Floci, is a lost city of Wallachia, now in Romania. Floci, in this context, means "wool"; the name refers to the local sheep and wool market.

The city was located at the confluence of Ialomița River and the Danube, on the old riverbed of the Ialomița. The name meant "The Fleece City" in Romanian, as it was an important market town. The city is first mentioned in 1431 during the rule of Dan II of Wallachia, but probably existed as trading post in the previous century.

It was set on fire by Stephen III of Moldavia during the wars with Wallachia under the rule of Radu cel Frumos (who was an ally of the Ottoman Empire). The city recovered quickly, but it was once again destroyed by the Polish and Tatar troops of Simion Movilă.

According to contemporaneous accounts, Michael the Brave, the famous Voivode of Wallachia, was born in this city; his birthplace is reportedly the top touristic destination in Ialomița County.

The city finally decayed during the Russo-Turkish War (1768–1774), when most inhabitants fled due to the fighting. In the place of the city was formed the village Piua-Petrii, which was destroyed, in turn, during the floods of the early 20th century. Currently, the ruins of the city are located on the territory of Giurgeni commune.
