= Newmark Group =

American real estate services firm

Newmark Group Inc.
- Type: Public
- Traded as: Nasdaq: NMRK (Class A); Russell 2000 Index component
- ISIN: US65158N1028
- Industry: Real estate
- Founded: 1929; 97 years ago
- Headquarters: 125 Park Avenue; New York City, U.S.
- Number of locations: 170 (2024)
- Key people: Barry M. Gosin (CEO); Michael Rispoli (CFO); Luis Alvarado (COO); Stephen Merkel (Chairman)
- Services: Capital Markets; Industrial and Logistics Services; Landlord Representation; Multifamily Capital Markets; Property Management; Retail Services; Tenant Representation; Valuation & Advisory
- Revenue: ▲$3.3 billion (2025)
- Net income: ▲US$126 million (2025)
- Total assets: ▲US$5.02 billion (2025)
- Total equity: ▲US$1.46 billion (2025)
- Number of employees: 8,000+ (2024)
- Website: nmrk.com

Newmark Group Inc. is a global commercial real estate advisory and services firm headquartered in New York City. It operates as Newmark, and is listed on the NASDAQ Global Select Market under the symbol "NMRK".

According to MSCI, Newmark was the third-largest investment broker in the Americas in 2023. In its ‘Top CRE Brokerage Firms of 2023, Commercial Property Executive ranked Newmark 3rd.

In 2011, the company was acquired by Cantor Fitzgerald, headed by Howard Lutnick. In 2025, Lutnick became commerce secretary in the second Donald Trump administration.

== History ==
=== Early years ===
Newmark was founded in 1929 in Manhattan by Dave Newmark. In 1953, Aaron Gural joined Newmark & Company as a real estate broker, later purchasing the company in 1956 with partners. Gural served as Chairman of Newmark & Company from 1957 to 1998.

Under Gural's leadership, Newmark began acquiring properties throughout Manhattan starting with 230 Fifth Avenue. Other notable property acquisitions during this time included the Film Center Building at 630 Ninth Avenue and the historic DuMont building at 515 Madison Avenue. Gural became known as one of the first real estate executives to see the potential for restoring West Side industrial sites and abandoned lofts in the Garment District.

In 1978, Aaron Gural's son, Jeffrey Gural, and Barry Gosin took ownership of the company. Throughout the late 1980s, in response to a lull in New York City's real estate market, Gosin began building Newmark’s brokerage and advisory division. Gosin would later tell The New York Times that it was Newmark's unique combination of being a brokerage firm and having a significant investment portfolio that set the firm apart in the industry.

In 1992, James Kuhn joined Newmark as President after serving as the owner/manager of the Mendik Company, where he oversaw the acquisition of 11 million square feet of office space and 6,000 apartments.

Throughout the 1990s, Newmark continued to expand its property holdings, including through the purchase of New York's Flatiron Building beginning in 1997. In the late 1990s, the firm grew beyond its basic leasing and management operation by expanding its corporate services division.

=== Since 2001 ===
In 2001, Newmark invested in national appraiser Koeppel Tener Real Estate Services, founded by Alfred J. Koeppel. In 2006, Newmark formed a partnership with London-based real estate firm Knight Frank becoming Newmark Knight Frank. In October 2011, BGC Partners, Inc., an American global financial services company based in New York City, acquired Newmark. With the acquisition, Howard W. Lutnick, Chairman and Chief Executive Officer of BGC, became Chairman of Newmark, with Gosin, who had previously served on BGC's Board of Directors, remaining as Newmark's CEO and Jeff Gural as Chairman Emeritus.

In April 2012, BGC Partners acquired assets of commercial real estate brokerage Grubb & Ellis, founded in 1958 by Donald Sr. & John Grubb & Harold Ellis, to form Newmark Grubb Knight Frank (NGKF). Newmark announced an expansion in South America in 2014 through partnerships in Argentina, Brazil, Colombia, Chile and Peru. According to Newmark, the firm currently operates in Argentina, Brazil, Colombia, Costa Rica, Mexico, Panama, and Puerto Rico. On December 15, 2017, Newmark listed on the Nasdaq stock exchange. In October 2020, Newmark Knight Frank formally rebranded to Newmark.

On June 2, 2021, The Washington Post reported that The Trump Organization had hired Newmark to sell its lease to the Trump International Hotel in Washington, DC. "A representative of Newmark Group declined to comment", the Post said.

In February 2025, Barry Gosin assumed the additional role of Chairman of its operating company, Newmark & Company Real Estate, Inc, following Howard Lutnick’s confirmation as 41st United States Secretary of Commerce. Stephen Merkel was named Newmark’s Chairman of the Board of Directors. Kyle Lutnick also joined as a member of the Board. In April 2025, Luis Alvarado assumed the role of Chief Operating Officer.

== Acquisitions History ==
Over the past decade, Newmark and its parent company BGC Partners, Inc. have expanded real estate services and geographic reach through the acquisition of companies in the United States and internationally. Newmark has acquired more than 55 companies since 2011.

2012

- BGC Partners acquired the assets of commercial real estate brokerage Grubb & Ellis Company, merging it with Newmark to create Newmark Grubb Knight Frank (NGKF).
- BGC Partners acquired Denver-based Frederick Ross, a firm specializing in real estate brokerage, consultancy, advisory and investment services, and Philadelphia-based Smith Mack, expanding Newmark’s brokerage and advisory services in Pennsylvania, Delaware and New Jersey.

2014

- Newmark acquired commercial services firm Cornish & Carey Commercial, based in northern California. Also in 2014, BCG Partners, Inc. acquired Apartment Realty Advisors, one of the largest apartment building brokers in the U.S., for roughly $110 million.

2015

- BGC Partners, Inc. acquired real estate consulting firm Computerized Facility Integration, LLC, Excess Space Retail Services Inc., Also in 2015, Newmark acquired Cincinnati Commercial Real Estate, a commercial real estate firm in Cincinnati, Ohio, and Steffner Commercial Real Estate, which operated as Newmark Grubb Memphis. The Steffner Commercial Real Estate acquisition was part of Newmark's Mid-South growth plan for Tennessee, Kentucky, Mississippi, Alabama, Arkansas and Louisiana.

2016

- Newmark acquired San Francisco–based CRE Group, a project management and construction management firm with a strong regional presence. Also in 2016, Newmark acquired two companies in the multifamily sector: Rudesill-Para Multifamily, a brokerage firm in Tennessee, and Walchle Lear, a brokerage firm based in Florida.

2017

- Newmark acquired Regency Capital Partners (RCP), a real estate capital advisory firm headquartered in San Francisco, California. RCP is known for financing for clients with extensive experience in joint ventures, construction debt and permanent financings across all property types, with a specific focus on structured debt and equity for large-scale office and multifamily developments. Also in 2017, Newmark’s parent company BGC Partners, Inc. acquired multi-family lending provider Berkeley Point Financial LLC from financial services firm Cantor Fitzgerald for $875 million.

2018

- Newmark acquired corporate tenant representation real estate agency Jackson & Cooksey, based in Dallas, Texas, and retail brokerage company RKF.

2019

- In 2019, Newmark expanded its presence in the United Kingdom with the acquisition of Harper Dennis Hobbs, a retail real estate advisory firm based in London.
- Also in 2019, Newmark acquired MiT National Land Services, a national title agency based in New York.

2020

- Newmark acquires Hopkins Appraisal Services

2021

- Newmark acquired two companies in the flexible office space: flexible workspace platform Knotel in March and Paris-based Deskeo in October. The Deskeo acquisition added over 50 locations to Newmark's international flexible office portfolio.

2022

- Newmark acquired London-based real estate advisory firm BH2 and North American retail real estate advisory firms Open Realty Advisors and Open Realty Properties. Also in 2022, Newmark acquired McCall & Almy, a Boston brokerage firm focused on tenant representation. McCall & Almy’s longtime clients include Harvard University, Bose and Partners HealthCare System.

2023

- It is announced that Newmark Group has acquired Gerald Eve in a deal which follows the acquisitions of investment sales and leasing advisory firms BH2 and Harper Dennis Hobbs in the UK and Paris-based flexible office subsidiary Deskeo in 2022.

== Awards and recognition ==
In 2026, Newmark ranked #1 among Commercial Property Executive’s Top Commercial Real Estate Finance Firms, with more than $72.4 billion in debt and equity placements. Newmark also reported being ranked #1 among Multi-Housing News’ Top Multifamily Finance Firms. It was also named to the 2026 IAOP Global 100, marking its 17th consecutive year on the list.

In 2025, Newmark ranked #1 among Commercial Property Executive’s and Multi-Housing News’ Top Mortgage Banking and Brokerage Firms, with loans totaling more than $48.4 billion. It was also named the #1 Freddie Mac Multifamily lender for manufactured housing communities and received Euromoney’s North America’s Best Real Estate Adviser award. Newmark reported being ranked #1 among U.S. office sales brokers for deals of at least $25 million, with a 26% market share, according to Real Estate Alert. It also reported #1 subsector breakouts for brokers of multifamily properties in senior living and student housing. In addition, Newmark was named to the 2025 Global Outsourcing 100 by the International Association of Outsourcing Professionals for the 16th consecutive year.

In 2024, Newmark was named as a Best Place to Work by GlobeSt. It was also awarded World’s Best Real Estate Consultant by Euromoney. In 2023, Newmark reported ranking third in U.S. investment sales for the full year, according to preliminary data from MSCI, excluding $21.7 billion of the Signature equity portion. In 2021, Multi-Housing News ranked Newmark third among its Most Powerful Brokerage Firms based on 2020 transaction volume.

== Controversies ==
In 2022, Newmark commercial real estate agents were sued by a client after they drastically mispriced an asset in a deal they brokered. The property, once owned by OCA - Asian Pacific American Advocates, a Washington, D.C.–based non-profit, was sold for $4.4 million. Four months later, the buyer resold the asset for a 30% increase. The non-profit claimed that it did not receive the full price for its property because of errors made by Newmark's agents.

In 2018, the company was sued by an administrative assistant over sexual harassment claims. While working in the firm, she alleged suffering repeated sexual advances, which she rebuffed. She further claimed that when she raised the issue to human resources, she was terminated. In a statement, a Newmark spokesperson said "we have thoroughly investigated allegations made by a former employee and have determined them to be baseless."

In 2017, a Newmark executive, Mike Arnold, was sued for sexual harassment. Arnold's lawyers sought disclosure of the victim's real name and dismissal of the case on procedural grounds. The victim claimed she was ogled and stalked, among other sexual harassment.

== See also ==
- CBRE Group
- JLL (company)
- Cushman & Wakefield
