= Lunca Banului =

- Commune
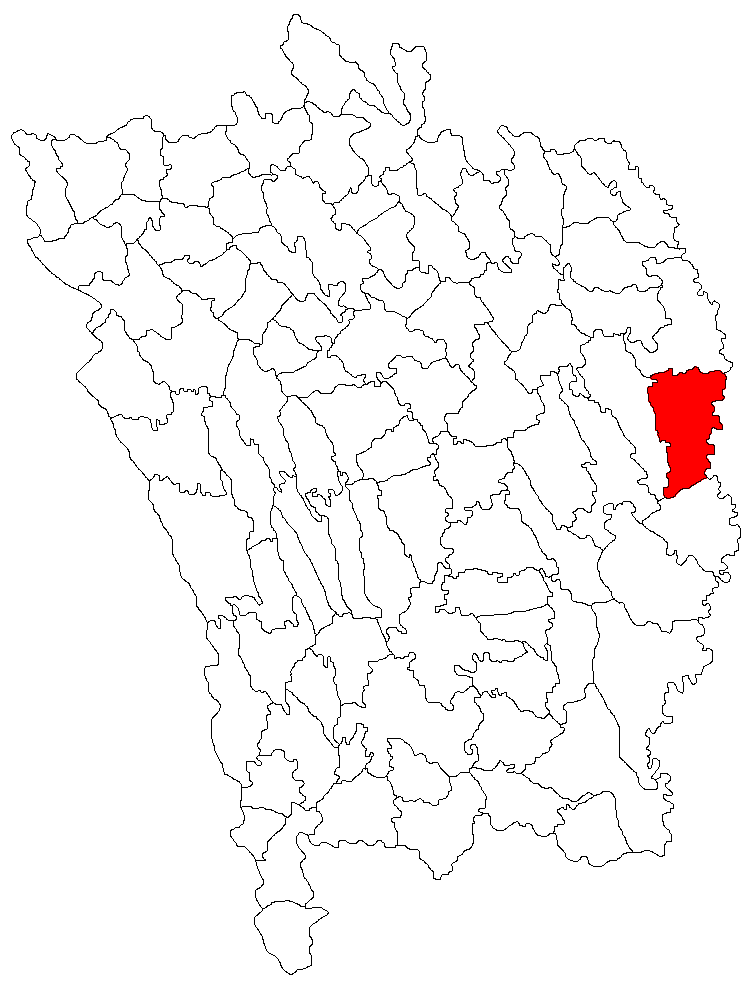
- Location in Vaslui County

- Location in Romania
- Coordinates: 46°35′42″N 28°10′06″E
- Country: Romania
- County: Vaslui
- Subdivisions: Broscoșești, Condrea, Focșa, Lunca Banului, Lunca Veche, Oțetoaia, Răducani

Government
  - Mayor (2020–2024): Dănuț Tofan (PSD)
- Area: 83.09 km^{2} (32.08 sq mi)
- Elevation: 38 m (125 ft)
- Population (2021-12-01): 3,232
  - Density: 39/km^{2} (100/sq mi)
- Time zone: EET/EEST (UTC+2/+3)
- Postal code: 737340
- Area code: +(40) x37
- Vehicle reg.: VS
- Website: www.primarialuncabanului.ro

Lunca Banului is a commune in Vaslui County, Western Moldavia, Romania. It is composed of seven villages: Broscoșești, Condrea, Focșa, Lunca Banului, Lunca Veche, Oțetoaia, and Răducani.

The commune is located in the eastern part of Vaslui County, about 60 km (37 mi) southeast of the county seat, Vaslui, on the Moldova–Romania border. It lies on the right bank of the Prut River, which marks the border; the Pruteț, a right tributary of the Prut, flows through Lunca Banului, Oțetoaia, and Lunca Veche villages.
