= Vargun Gura =

- Location in Iran
- Coordinates: 37°14′28″N 48°58′09″E
- Country: Iran
- Province: Ardabil Province
- Time zone: UTC+3:30 (IRST)
  - Summer (DST): UTC+4:30 (IRDT)

Vargun Gura is a village in the Ardabil Province of Iran.
