= Alfred J. Koeppel =

American real estate developer (1932–2001)

- Born: Alfred James Koeppel; September 14, 1932
- Died: January 19, 2001 (aged 68); Manhattan, New York, New York, United States
- Education: B.A. Trinity College; J.D. Brooklyn Law School
- Occupation: Real estate developer
- Known for: Partner in Koeppel & Koeppel founder of Koeppel Tener Real Estate Services
- Spouse: Ruth Rubenstein
- Children: Caleb D. Koeppel; David J. Koeppel; Sarah Koeppel Cohn
- Parent: Max Koeppel
- Family: Abraham Koeppel (grandfather); Bevin Koeppel (brother)

Alfred J. Koeppel (September 14, 1932 – January 19, 2001) was an American real estate executive and attorney. Koeppel was a member of one of the oldest real estate families in New York, and a board chairman at Trinity College in Hartford, Connecticut.

== Biography ==
Koeppel was born to a Jewish family, the youngest of six children born to Minnie Lechner and Max Koeppel. He had five siblings: Bevin Koeppel, Selma Koeppel Friedman, Geraldine Koeppel Adler, Grace Koeppel Gold, and Louise Koeppel Feldman.

His grandfather and family patriarch, Abraham Koeppel, immigrated to the United States in 1890’s and became a developer of residential properties in Brooklyn. In the 1940s, his father and uncle, Max and Harry, joined the family business (renamed Koeppel & Koeppel) and shifted the company's activities to Manhattan, investing and managing both apartment and office towers.

Alfred graduated from the Polytechnic Preparatory Country Day School in Brooklyn, Trinity College in Hartford in 1954, and Brooklyn Law School. In 1954, Alfred joined the firm. In 1963, the business was divided with Max Koeppel and his two sons, Alfred and Bevin, taking commercial properties with their headquarters in downtown Manhattan; and Harry and his sons handling the residential properties with their primary office in midtown Manhattan. In 1985, Alfred's father Max died and he and his brother became principals partners in the firm. In 1988, Alfred and his three children founded a new company known as Koeppel Tener Real Estate Services (KTR). KTR provides brokerage, valuation, underwriting, environmental, engineering, construction loan monitoring and consulting services throughout the country with its main office in New York and other offices located in Chicago, Dallas and Los Angeles (in 2001, multinational real estate service firm Newmark Grubb Knight Frank made a significant investment KTR).

== Philanthropy and boardships ==
Koeppel served as a trustee at Trinity College since 1985, as board chairman from 1990 to 1996, and as a board member until 2000. He also served as interim president of Trinity in 1994 and led a $175 million redevelopment of the neighborhood surrounding the Trinity campus. Trinity awarded him the Alumni Medal for Excellence and the Eigenbrodt Cup, and awarded him an honorary Doctor of Laws. The Koeppel Social Center and the Alfred J. Koeppel Chair of Classical Studies are named in his honor.

He was a prominent benefactor of Hebrew Union College where he was a member of the Board of Overseers until his death. He also served as a trustee and vice president of Temple Beth El of Great Neck, New York for 12 years, as a director of the United Community Fund of Great Neck from 1965 to 1971, and as treasurer of the Village of Kings Point, New York from 1973 to 1974.

== Personal life ==
In 1955, he married Ruth Rubenstein who was also Jewish; they had three children: Caleb D. Koeppel (married to Lynne Greenberg, daughter of Alan C. Greenberg), David J. Koeppel, and Sarah Koeppel Cohn. Koeppel died in 2001; services were held at Temple Emanuel in Manhattan.
