= Chagrianda =

- Location within Azad Kashmir
- Coordinates: 33.20°N 74.03°E
- Sovereign state: Pakistan
- Dependent territory: Azad Kashmir

Government
  - Governor: Raja Ahmed Kamal
- Elevation: 792 m (2,598 ft)
- Time zone: UTC+5 (PST)

Chagrianda is a union council in the Kotli District of Azad Kashmir.
