= Gura, Jalandhar =

Gura
- Village
- Location in Punjab, India Gura (India)
- Coordinates: 31.1442493°N 75.8294874°E
- Country: India
- State: Punjab
- District: Jalandhar

Government
  - Type: Panchayat raj
  - Body: Gram panchayat
- Elevation: 240 m (790 ft)

Population (2011)
  - Total: 1,108
- Sex ratio 603/505 ♂/♀

Languages
  - Official: Punjabi
- Time zone: UTC+5:30 (IST)
- PIN: 144418
- Telephone: 01826
- ISO 3166 code: IN-PB
- Vehicle registration: PB- 08
- Website: jalandhar.nic.in

Gura is a village in Jalandhar district of Punjab State, India. It is located 8.3 km away from Goraya, 19 km from Phillaur, 36.6 km from district headquarter Jalandhar and 127 km from state capital Chandigarh. The village is administrated by a sarpanch who is an elected representative of village as per Panchayati raj (India).

== Demography ==
According to the report published by Census India in 2011, Gura has a total number of 231 houses and population of 1108 of which include 603 males and 505 females. Literacy rate of Gura is 80.16%, higher than state average of 75.84%. The population of children under the age of 6 years is 105 which is 9.48% of total population of Gura, and child sex ratio is approximately 750 lower than state average of 897.

Most of the people are from Schedule Caste which constitutes 69.49% of total population in Gura. The town does not have any Schedule Tribe population so far.

As per census 2011, 380 people were engaged in work activities out of the total population of Gura which includes 340 males and 40 females. According to census survey report 2011, 95% workers describe their work as main work and 5% workers are involved in marginal activity providing livelihood for less than 6 months.

== Transport ==
Goraya railway station is the nearest train station. However, Phagwara Junction train station is 13.5 km away from the village. The village is 50.3 km away from domestic airport in Ludhiana and the nearest international airport is located in Chandigarh also Sri Guru Ram Dass Jee International Airport is the second nearest airport which is 131 km away in Amritsar.
