= Gura Sonigara =

- village
- Interactive map of Gura Sonigara
- Coordinates: 25°34′59.6″N 73°19′43.7″E
- Country: India
- State: Rajasthan

Languages
  - Official: Hindi
- Time zone: UTC+5:30 (IST)
- ISO 3166 code: RJ-IN

Gura Sonigara is a small village located in Pali Tehsil in Pali district of Rajasthan, India. The village is just below Gura Sonigara Panchayath. It belongs to Jodhpur division.
