= Gura Ialomiței =

- Commune
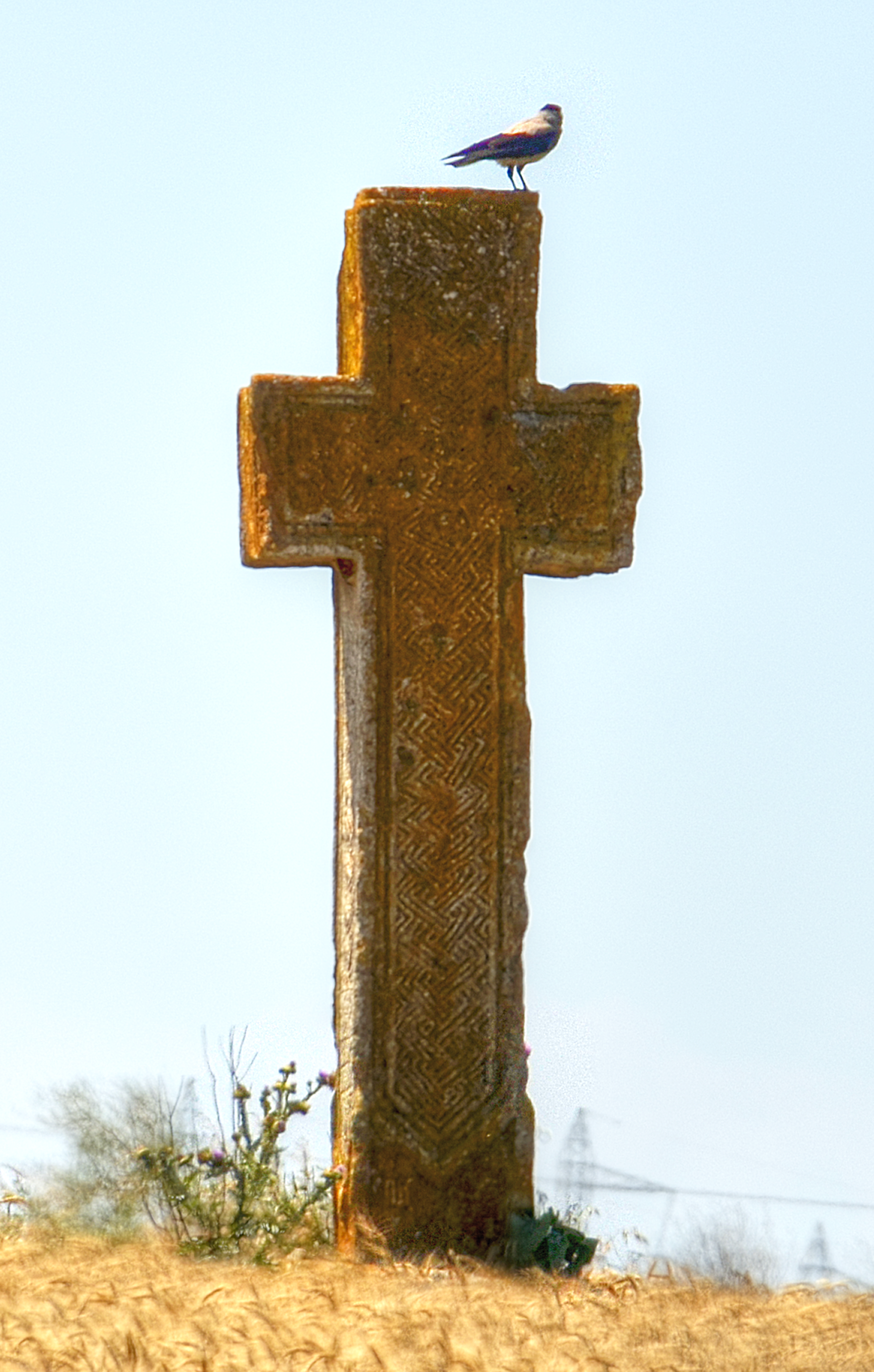
- The Tall Cross, erected in honor of Matei Basarab

- Location in Ialomița County

- Location in Romania
- Coordinates: 44°42′N 27°46′E
- Country: Romania
- County: Ialomița

Government
  - Mayor (2021–2024): Nicu Biserică (PSD)
- Area: 43.62 km^{2} (16.84 sq mi)
- Elevation: 13 m (43 ft)
- Population (2021-12-01): 2,258
  - Density: 51.77/km^{2} (134.1/sq mi)
- Time zone: UTC+02:00 (EET)
  - Summer (DST): UTC+03:00 (EEST)
- Postal code: 927166
- Area code: +(40) 243
- Vehicle reg.: IL
- Website: www.gura-ialomitei.ro

Gura Ialomiței is a commune located in Ialomița County, Muntenia, Romania. It is composed of two villages, Gura Ialomiței and Luciu.

The Communist regime operated a forced labor camp at Luciu-Giurgeni, in between Luciu village and the nearby Giurgeni commune.

Historical population
Year	Pop.	±%
1899	1,819	—
1925	2,015	+10.8%
2002	2,859	+41.9%
2011	2,660	−7.0%
2021	2,258	−15.1%
Source: Census data
