= Aaron Gural =

- Born: Aaron Guralnick; March 11, 1917
- Died: March 10, 2009 (aged 91)
- Occupation: real estate developer
- Known for: chairman of Newmark Group
- Spouses: Harriet Feil (deceased); Marion Katz
- Children: Jeffrey Gural; Jane Gural Senders; Barbara Gural
- Parent(s): Meyer Guralnick; Rose Guralnick

Aaron Gural, originally Guralnick (March 11, 1917 – March 10, 2009) was chairman of New York real estate developer Newmark & Company for over 40 years.

== Biography ==
Gural was born Aaron Guralnick in Manhattan, one of three children of Meyer and Rose Guralnick. He was raised in Washington Heights neighborhood of Manhattan. He shortened his last name to Gural. He graduated with a B.A. in accounting from New York University. His first job was reading water and electric meters for a company owned by his uncles called Spear & Company (which was purchased by Harry Helmsley in 1955 to form Helmsley-Spear). He then worked as a real estate broker and joined Newmark & Company in 1953. In 1956, he purchased Newmark with his two partners. He served as chairman from 1957 to 1998.

He was one of the first to convert industrial West Side properties and abandoned lofts to trendy, gentrified uses. He also acquired numerous landmark New York properties, such as the Flatiron Building. He was involved in the acquisition of over six million square feet of buildings in the New York metropolitan area through his career. His strategy was always to hold onto real estate over the long term.

== Personal life and death ==
Gural was married twice: his first wife, Harriet Feil, died in 1945; his second wife, Marion Katz, the daughter of Russian Jewish immigrants, died in 1990. He has three children: Jeffrey Gural, Jane Gural Senders, and Barbara Gural. He died one day short of his 92nd birthday in Delray Beach, Florida, where he lived.

In 1979, Gural was a founding member of the Jewish Community Center of the Greater Five Towns. In 2018, the JCC was renamed the Marion & Aaron Gural Jewish Community Center in his honor. He also served as president of the Congregation Sons of Israel in Woodmere.
