= Gura Văii (river) =

- Location within Romania

Location
- Country: Romania
- Counties: Vaslui County
- Villages: Valea Grecului, Gura Văii

Physical characteristics
- Mouth: Pruteț
  - coordinates: 46.6334°N 28.1756°E
- Length: 24 km (15 mi)
- Basin size: 138 km^{2} (53 sq mi)

Basin features
- Progression: Pruteț→ Prut→ Danube→ Black Sea
- Tributaries
  - right: Pârâul lui Ivan, Recea

The Gura Văii is a right tributary of the river Pruteț in Romania. It discharges into the Pruteț near Stănilești. Its length is 24 km (15 mi) and its basin size is 138 km^{2} (53 sq mi).
