= Gura Ocniței =

- Commune
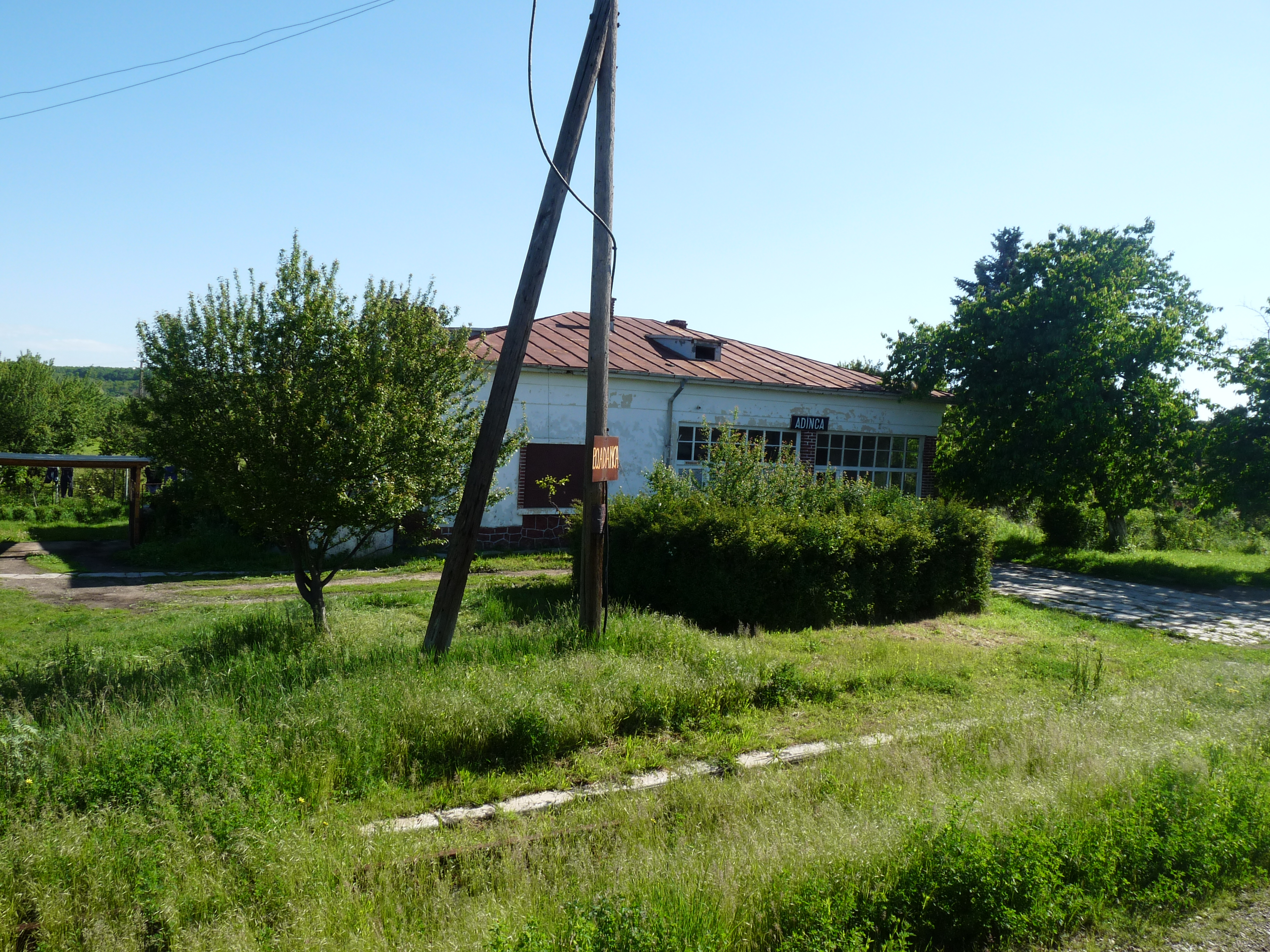
- The Adânca train station

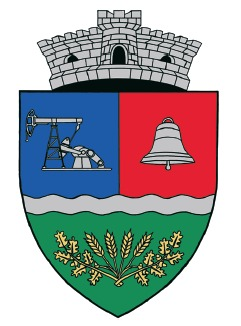
- Coat of arms

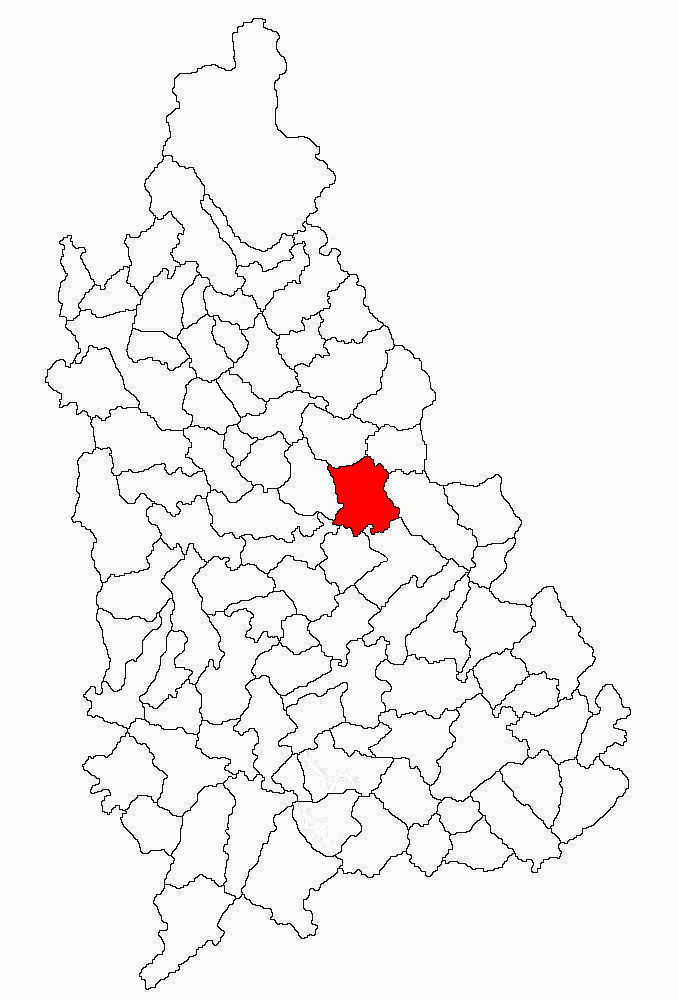
- Location in Dâmbovița County

- Location in Romania
- Coordinates: 44°56′42″N 25°33′42″E
- Country: Romania
- County: Dâmbovița

Government
  - Mayor (2020–2024): Sorin-Vasile Ioniță (PSD)
- Area: 44.96 km^{2} (17.36 sq mi)
- Elevation: 253 m (830 ft)
- Population (2021-12-01): 6,657
  - Density: 148.1/km^{2} (383.5/sq mi)
- Time zone: UTC+02:00 (EET)
  - Summer (DST): UTC+03:00 (EEST)
- Postal code: 137240
- Area code: +(40) 245
- Vehicle reg.: DB
- Website: www.primariaguraocnitei.ro

Gura Ocniței is a commune in Dâmbovița County, Muntenia, Romania. It is composed of four villages: Adânca, Gura Ocniței, Ochiuri, and Săcueni.

The commune is located in the central part of Dâmbovița County, 11 km (6.8 mi) east of the county seat, Târgoviște.

Historical population
Year	Pop.	±%
2002	7,965	—
2011	7,319	−8.1%
2021	6,657	−9.0%
Source: Census data

== Natives ==
- Mircea Drăgan (1932 – 2017), film director
