= Gura (surname) =

Gura and Güra are surnames. Notable people with the surname include:

- Alan Gura (born 1971), American litigator
- Eugen Gura (1842–1906), German operatic baritone
- Larry Gura (born 1947), American baseball pitcher
- Philip F. Gura (born 1950), American scholar and writer
- Sascha Gura (1896–1946), German actress
- Werner Güra (born 1964), German classical tenor
