= Gura Camencii =

- Commune
- Location within Moldova
- Coordinates: 47.89°N 28.3552777778°E
- Country: Moldova
- District: Florești District

Government
  - Mayor: Mihai Beiu (PDM)
- Elevation: 93 m (305 ft)

Population (2014)
  - Total: 3,018
- Time zone: UTC+2 (EET)
  - Summer (DST): UTC+3 (EEST)

Gura Camencii is a commune in Floreşti District, Moldova. It is composed of three villages: Bobulești, Gura Camencii and Gvozdova.
