= Stănilești =

- Commune
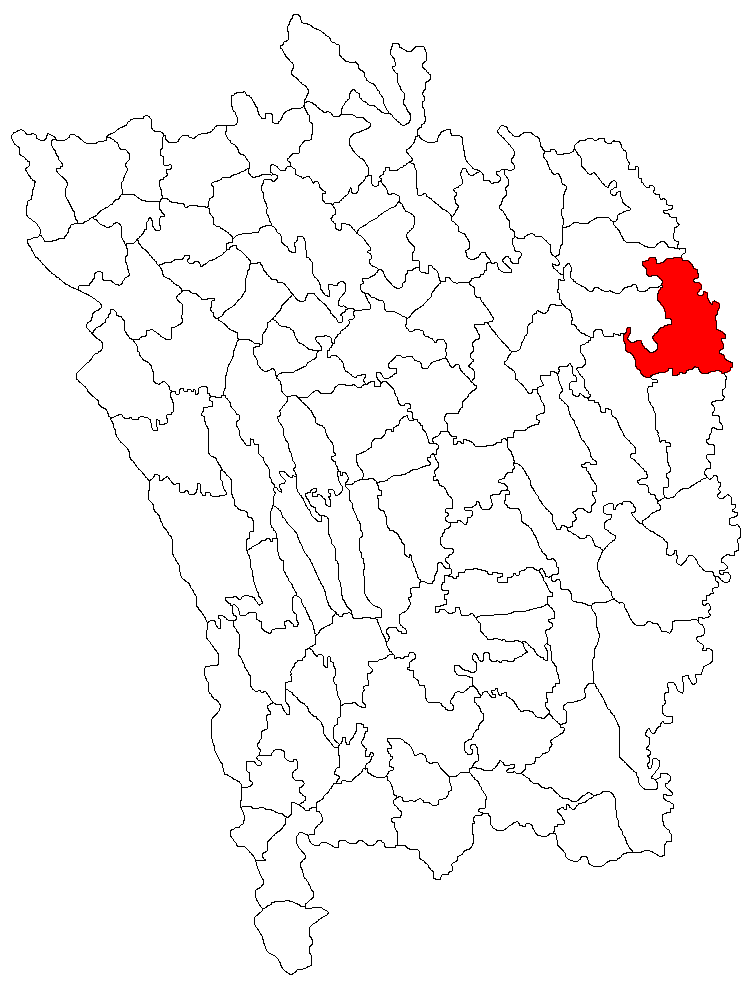
- Location in Vaslui County

- Location in Romania
- Coordinates: 46°37′06″N 28°10′17″E
- Country: Romania
- County: Vaslui
- Subdivisions: Bogdana-Voloseni, Budu Cantemir, Chersăcosu, Gura Văii, Pogănești, Săratu, Stănilești
- Population (2021-12-01): 5,006
- Time zone: EET/EEST (UTC+2/+3)
- Vehicle reg.: VS

Stănilești is a commune in Vaslui County, Western Moldavia, Romania. It is composed of seven villages: Bogdana-Voloseni, Budu Cantemir, Chersăcosu, Gura Văii, Pogănești, Săratu and Stănilești.

Stănilești was the site of the 1711 Battle of Stănilești between the Russo-Moldavian and the Ottoman armies.
