= Bindian =

- Location within Azad Kashmir
- Coordinates: 33.20°N 74.04°E
- Country: Pakistan
- Province: Azad Kashmir
- Elevation: 810 m (2,660 ft)
- Time zone: UTC+5 (PST)

Bindian is a small village in Kotli District of Pakistani Kashmir.

== Geography ==
Bindian lies 20 miles from the town of Kotli in the heart of the Bannah Valley of Khuiratta, which can also be pronounced Khoiratta.

== Demographics ==
Most of the people are farmers, working abroad and in Military.

== Overview ==
Bindian is a hub for political and religious activities in Banah Valley. There are many qualified teachers, professors, librarians, military, and air force employees.

People in village usually live in houses made of bricks, clay or mud. These typically have two or three rooms which house extended families. Although now they prefer living by making separate home for each family (nuclear units) but they don't live far away from their relatives, and they are extending their villages by making more homes. Due to geographical and other socioeconomic diversity, different regions have slightly different physical and social layout. The village is also known for its wheat and corn which is still grown organically.

Bindian has two schools, a boys high school (Colonel Qazi Jan high School) and a girls school that children attend from age 4.

== Notables ==
- Colonel Qazi Muhammad Jan SJ
- Master Allaf Deen
- Qazi Mohammed Khalil Qureshi
- Ghazi Abdur Rehman
- Colonel Qazi Muhammad Farooq
- Haji Raj Mohammad
- Master Abdul Kareem

== Religion ==
Bindian is 100% Sunni Muslim population, has a masjid that is located in the middle of the village on the spot known as the taup.
