= Henric Streitman =

Romanian journalist, translator and political figure (1873 - 1950)

Henric Ștefan Streitman
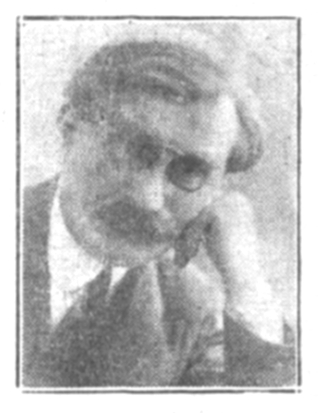
- Streitman in 1938

Romanian Senator
- In office 1922–1927
- Constituency: Storojineț

Chairman of the Central Jewish Office
- In office February 7 – December 30, 1942
- Preceded by: none
- Succeeded by: Nandor Gingold

Personal details
- Born: February 16, 1870 Piatra Neamț, Principality of Romania
- Died: March 1950 (aged 80) Bucharest, People's Republic of Romania
- Party: People's Party (to 1932); National Agrarian Party (1932–1935)
- Spouse: Rachel Vermont
- Children: Max-Radu Streitman
- Profession: Journalist, essayist, publisher, civil servant, diplomat

Henric Ștefan Streitman (first name also Henric Șt., Enric, Henri or Henry, last name also Streitmann, Streittman, Ștraitman; February 16, 1870 – c. March 30, 1950) was a Romanian journalist, translator and political figure, who traversed the political spectrum from socialism to the far-right. A physicist, social commentator and publisher, in his early years he was a promoter of natural selection ideas as well as a translator of Marxist and naturalist literature. Respected for both his polemical stances and his erudition, he was also rendered controversial by his inconsistencies and his alleged corruption. Often struggling financially, Streitman set up several short-lived periodicals, and involved himself in the cultural and political debates, from 1889 to the time of his death.

A Romanian Jew, Streitman left Judaism for political reasons. He returned to it following a death in the family, though he continued to publicize his agnosticism in his essays of the 1930s. He also discarded socialism before 1916, moving closer to the National Liberal Party, and working alongside Ion G. Duca and Constantin Banu. He endorsed the Allies during the early stages of World War I, and was consequently detained by the German Army following its occupation of southern Romania. Streitman was sent us a hostage to Bulgaria, but released by the end of 1917; returning to Bucharest, he was recovered by the Germanophile press, endorsing Romania's capitulation. This controversial activity was held against him by political adversaries throughout the interwar period.

When Streitman returned to public life in the 1920s, it was primarily as an anticommunist. He affiliated with the right-wing People's Party, serving two terms in the Senate of Romania, where he represented Bukovina; in that context, he publicly endorsed a Polish–Romanian alliance against the Soviet Union. Also employed as an adviser by the Ministry of Foreign Affairs, he drew notice for his close collaboration with the titular minister, Nicolae Titulescu, and for his early support of European integration. In a contrasting move, Streitman also associated with figures on the Romanian far-right, including Octavian Goga and Pamfil Șeicaru, and eventually joined the National Agrarian Party in 1932. However, in the late 1930s, the ascent of antisemitism put his political career on hold.

Streitman turned to collaboration with the military-fascist dictatorship of Ion Antonescu during World War II, becoming president of the Central Jewish Office. Though reviled in Antonescian propaganda as a Jewish pillar of the old regime, he was trusted for his earlier connection with Goga, and also vetted by Nazi Germany. This assignment pitted him against non-collaborationists such as A. L. Zissu, who resented his appeals to compliance. His was a largely ceremonial office, with many of its functions supplanted by the executive leader, Nandor Gingold. Ultimately sidelined in December 1942, Streitman survived the war by a few years. Unlike Gingold, he was never brought before the Romanian People's Tribunals. Slowly forgotten by the time of his death in 1950, he was survived by a son, Max-Radu, who had acted as a lawyer for champions of left-wing causes, and was allowed a second career as a classical musician.

== Biography ==
=== Early years ===
Streitman was a native of Piatra Neamț town, which is located in mountainous Western Moldavia. His exact birthday was given by a writer friend, Tudor Arghezi, as February 16, 1870; he is known to have had a sister, Ida, who was five years his junior. The Streitmans practiced Judaism, and, like the majority of Romanian Jews living before 1920, were non-emancipated, and not yet eligible for Romanian citizenship; later in life, Henric rejected being labeled with the term "Israelite", which he regarded as a pretentious euphemism. According to his own definitions, his father was "one of our town's leading men of culture". When he was aged five, his family hosted Velvel Zbarjer, an itinerant singer, whose presence impressed Henric; shortly after this, Zbarjer was expelled from the Principality of Romania for having publicized a poem "critical of the country's injustices." Young Streitman was privately tutored, in both German and French, by the Count Jurawski, a Polish refugee. As he recalled decades later, "the all-knowing, all-forgiving" Jurawski was also an amateur scientist who introduced his pupils, and Moldavians in general, to Lamarckism and Darwinism.

Enrolled at high school, Streitman also followed politics, and was close to the budding socialist movement of students in the newly-formed Kingdom of Romania. A 1936 note in Rampa magazine dates Steitman's debut to 1888, when the young man was published by Traian Demetrescu's Revista Olteană. In 1889, he began collaborating with Garabet Ibrăileanu's journal Școala Nouă, appearing alongside the young socialists Izabela Andrei, Panait Mușoiu, Raicu Ionescu-Rion. His articles covered a vast category of subjects, introducing the Romanian public to developments in sociology, hard science, and philology. The only speaker of German in that group, Streitman is presumed to be the author of articles signed I. Chilieanu (others believe this was Ibrăileanu's own pen name). Both the anonymous article and Streitman's signed pieces discuss the differences between literary naturalism and realism, and the naturalism vs. "pornography" debate of the 1880s. The young author completed his education abroad, and trained in several fields. He studied physics and chemistry at the universities of Göttingen, Zurich, Berlin, and then at the Technical College Stuttgart.

In July 1889, the illegal newspaper Sozialdemokrat claimed that Streitman, "a cowardly and totally characterless person", acted as a police informant "in order to save himself from possible expulsion". Allegedly as a result of his reports, the Kingdom of Württemberg prosecuted a Marxist organizer, Eduard Fuchs. Throughout this interval as an expatriate, Streitman continued to send his articles to Școala Nouă, before it ultimately succumbed in May 1890. In Germany, Streitman was university colleagues with several prominent Romanian intellectuals of various political hues: Barbu Brănișteanu, Gheorghe Gh. Longinescu, Simion Mehedinți, Alexandru Tzigara-Samurcaș, etc. He also traveled out of Central Europe, and heard lectures in philosophy at Rome University. According to academic Marian Petcu, it remains unclear whether he ever specialized in any particular field. Other records suggest that Streitman eventually obtained a Sc.D. in physical chemistry, and a license degree in Philosophy.

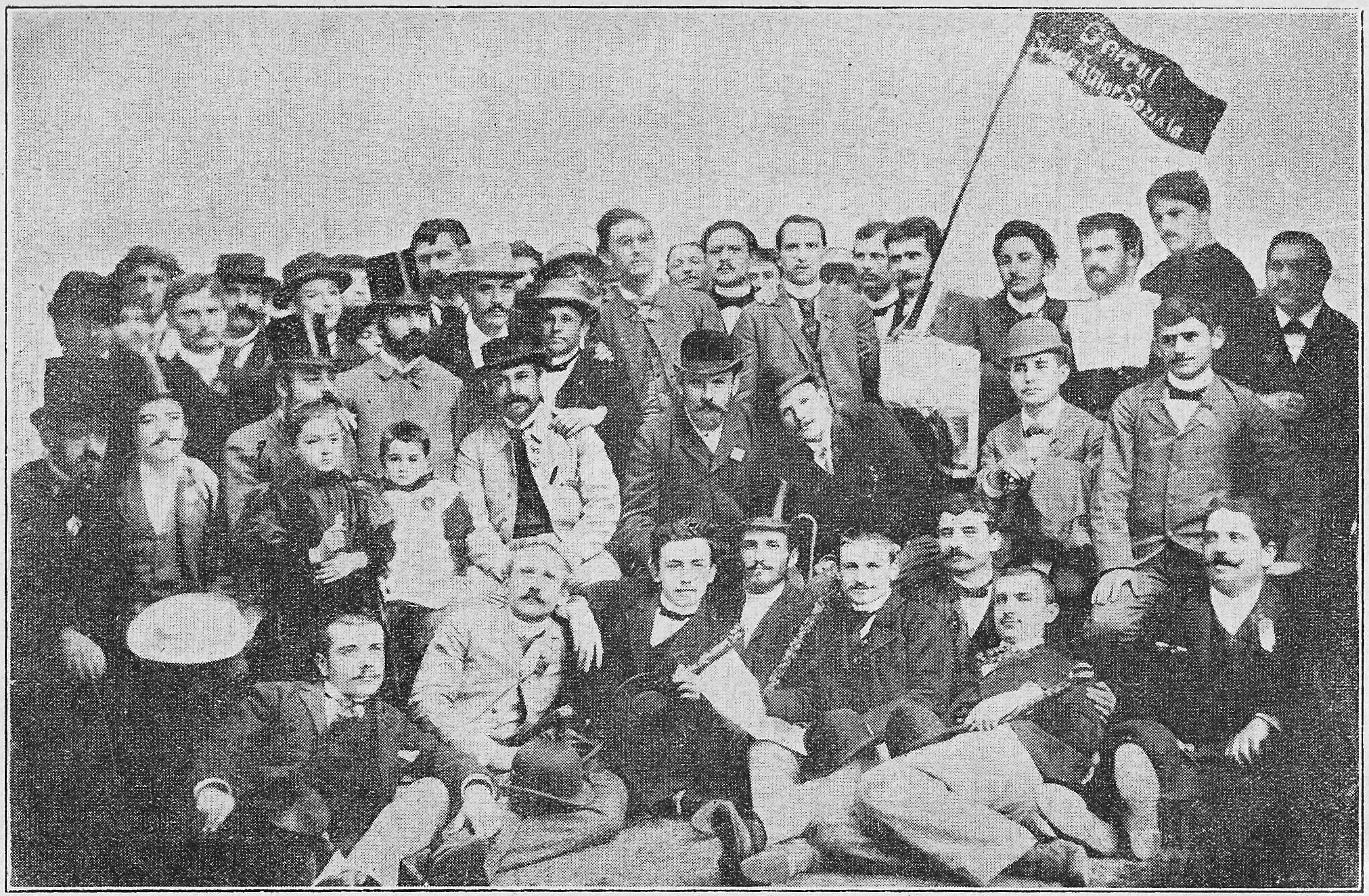
Socialist reunion in Bucharest, 1892. Constantin Dobrogeanu-Gherea and Constantin Mille in the foreground. Streitman is in the back row, holding up the red flag; to his right, Henric Sanielevici and Ion Păun-Pincio

Streitman's earliest contributions to cultural journalism also include a profile of poet Mihai Eminescu, published in June 1891 by a radical-liberal newspaper, Românul. It stood out for promoting the notion that Eminescu's skeptical conservatism was the result of his being mistreated by society; the theory was reviewed with derision by the Greek Catholic paper Unirea, who introduced Streitman as "a Jew, a German, or God knows what else". Reportedly, the young writer made his full debut in journalism in 1894, when he contributed regularly to the same Românul. However, he was by then affiliated with the Sotir Circle of socialists, Bucharest, and began contributing to the socialist magazine, Munca. Among his colleagues there was a female journalist, Rachel Vermont, who became his wife. Together, they completed and circulated translations of scientific and scientistic literature. In 1894, Henric and Rachel Streitman published the first volume of Max Nordau's Degeneration. A boy (named Max-Radu Streitman) was born to the couple in September 1895; this was announced in Lupta, which also noted that Henric was at the time a staff journalist at Țara newspaper.

As a traditionalist reviewer, Ilarie Chendi spoke of the Streitmans' work as part of a "Jewish translation" phenomenon which had taken up cultural space in fin de siècle Romania; he also noted similar contributions by Saniel Grossman, Adolphe Stern, and I. Hussar. Chendi identified Nordau as a main reference for Jews active in Romanian literature, "a sort of protective father-figure for the Romanian Jews." In their introductory study to Degeneration, the Streitmans highlighted the connections between Nordau and socialism, but also introduced footnotes claiming to correct the author for his disagreements with Marxism. A year later, the literary duo returned with a version of August Bebel's Woman.

Streitman's work was soon acknowledged in the literary profession, and discussed by Constantin Stamatin-Nazone in his 1894 essay Profilurĭ ("Profiles"). As argued by historian of journalism G. Brătescu, Streitman impressed and influenced the greats of Romanian journalism with his "subtle, malicious, ironic, doubting, often indulgent" writing style. Moreover, Brătescu writes, Streitman was an "erudite" and a competent reader of both secular and religious literature. In 1902, he followed up with the booklet Oamenii zilei. Instantanee ("People of the Day. Snapshots"), signing it with the pen name Almaviva.

=== Prezentul and Viitorul ===
Streitman's political stances became the subject of controversy when it came to his ignoring the territorial and cultural conflicts opposing Romania and Austria-Hungary. In October 1897, as a representative of Liberalul newspaper, he was invited by the Hungarian literary community to visit Budapest. He accepted the invitation, as did his colleagues Brănișteanu and Henric Sanielevici; most Romanian journalists rejected it, noting that their newspapers were in fact banned from even reaching Transleithania. In June 1900, Streitman and Petre I. Sturdza attended the Budapest premiere of Radu D. Rosetti's play, O lecție, and were fêted there by Hungarian journalists. According to Gazeta Transilvaniei, this implied that Streitman had "Hungarian sympathies", and had thus befriended Romania's rivals.

In May 1899, as the Conservative Party took control of the administration, it identified Streitman as a publicist for the rival National Liberal Party. He was reportedly harassed by General Ion Algiu, leader of the Romanian Police, who asked him to end such activities or be deported as a foreign national. In February 1903, Streitman was ultimately naturalized Romanian by special vote of the Senate. Covering this event, the community newspaper Egalitatea described him as fost evreŭ (a "former Jew"). According to a 1937 report in Új Kelet review, Streitman had embraced Romanian Orthodoxy—this was after the National Liberals' chairman, Dimitrie Sturdza, had "predicted a great career for him in case he converted." As a result, both Henric and Rachel "discreetly sunk their heads under holy water at some church in the suburbs". Henric now took on the Christian name "Ștefan", which he kept for the rest of his life. He denounced his own baptism soon after, when his pious mother died, leaving him "overcome with remorse". He recited the kaddish in her memory at Malbim Synagogue, where he continued to pray regularly, always wrapped in a tallit.

For a while, Streitman affiliated with the Romanian Society for Literature and Arts, an abortive professional organization, noted for attempting to group under one roof the Romanian writers and their non-emancipated Jewish colleagues. This body, created by N. Petrașcu, officially admitted him in December 1904. Streitman worked at Secolul ("The Century"), alongside Dumitru Karnabatt; their employer was M. Ghimpa, who was acting on behalf of a National Liberal politico, Eugeniu Stătescu. They left Secolul in October 1902, together with the entire editorial team, being signed up by Vasile Epurescu at another National Liberal sheet, Observatorul ("The Observer"). Streitman became its editor in chief, seconded by Karnabatt; while there, he reused his Almaviva signature to mount a passionate defense of novelist Duiliu Zamfirescu, who was being censured by critics such as Chendi. He took his journalistic career further when he a new daily, Prezentul ("The Now") and, in 1908, the weekly Cuvinte Libere ("Free Words"). Prezentul was engaged in polemics with Furnica, the satirical magazine. The latter hosted rhyming jokes about Streitman's supposed sensationalism. A "political magazine", Cuvinte Libere drew praise in Sămănătorul for the "distinguished urbanity of its polemical tone".

Streitman's coworkers and employees were Rudolf Uhrinowsky, ridiculed by Furnica for his unusual surname, poet Victor Eftimiu, and (Eftimiu noted) Adrien Le Corbeau, already famous as a habitual plagiarist. Joining them as literary contributors were three young poets, all of them representing the Romanian Symbolist movement: Mihail Cruceanu, Al. T. Stamatiad, and Eugeniu Sperantia. Streitman also bonded with a Symbolist author and Christian socialist, Gala Galaction, and prayed together with him at an unnamed synagogue in December 1908. In his account of the visit, Galaction proposed a Romanian–Jewish alliance: "a nation who knows how to pray in that way Jews can pray is invincible, impregnable"; Galaction also referred to Streitman as a "highly intelligent and prestigious journalist". Streitman remained a practicing Jew into the 1940s, whereas his wife never reverted back to Judaism.

According to Eftimiu, Prezentul was a struggling business, occupying an unheated room on Macca Arcade, with Streitman often missing out on payments for his staff. In March 1910, Streitman's entire mobile property was confiscated by court order, and auctioned off to pay off his debt to an R. Goldemberg. The two papers did not survive this, and Streitman returned to regular publishing work. He was soon appointed editor in chief of Viitorul, a newspaper put out by the National Liberals, with Ion G. Duca and Constantin Banu as managers, while he was also a "very close" collaborator of Banu's own review, Flacăra. Still a nominal left-winger, Streitman announced in December 1912 that he would be putting out a new magazine of his own, Realitatea ("Reality"), its mission being to "strip public life of all ideology, of all phraseology"; during those years, he was being approached by right-wing politicians, becoming friends with Duca, then also with Constantin Angelescu and Constantin Argetoianu. According to one account, he chaperoned a "stunningly beautiful actress" whom Duca was secretly dating.

In January 1913, Streitman became involved with Romania's first journalists' union, the General Association of the Press. Alongside Karnabatt, Constantin Bacalbașa, Constantin Costa-Foru, Scarlat Lahovary, Constantin Mille, Barbu Brănișteanu, I. Hussar, he held seat on a steering committee which approved of new entries. In 1910 and 1911, Streitman worked as a translator for Biblioteca Lumen company, publishing Henri Murger's Scènes de la vie de bohème, Bebel's Women and Socialism, and the short stories of Vladimir Korolenko. Streitman's version of Henri James de Rothschild's play, La Rampe, was used in production by the Alexandru Davila company. N. D. Cocea, a fellow socialist and a theater chronicler, noted that the production failed, not least of all because of Streitman's adaptation. According to Cocea, Streitman had an "elevated style" of writing, but was also a "very busy man", which meant that his text was published with many grammatical mistakes.

One of Streitman's last journalistic ventures for 1913 was a series of interviews on the "Jewish Question", which was published as a brochure by the Union of Native Jews. A Romanian rival, Romulus Cioflec, argued that the set mainly featured known philosemites such as Alexandru Ciurcu and Constantin G. Dissescu. During February 1914, his former associate Sanielevici exposed him as the pseudonymous Quidam of Cocea's Facla newspaper. Sanielevici, who opposed Cocea's politics, also attacked Streitman as "blacklisted by the German social-democratic party. A chemist, a charlatan, a socialist, a police worker, again a socialist, a journalist, a Mosaic believer, a Christian and again a Mosaic, a mystic, a philosopher, and a con man." In March, alongside Brănișteanu, Lahovary, Mille, Uhrinowsky, Petre Locusteanu and Alexandru Mavrodi, Streitman was present at the "Franco–Romanian brotherhood" banquet, honoring visitor Stéphane Lauzanne.

=== World War I and People's Party ===
Streitman's advocacy came to a halt during the debates and campaigns of World War I. In 1914, when Romania was still neutral territory, he published a monograph on the life and ideas of Jean Jaurès, the recently assassinated SFIO leader. In tandem, Streitman was also the staff writer for Naționalul newspaper, put out by Toma Stelian in support of the Allied Powers. His old adversaries at Furnica alleged that he was in business with his National Liberal contacts, a middleman for "compensation" exports to countries of the Central Powers. Streitman stayed behind enemy lines after the occupation of southern Romania. According to several accounts, he was one of eight Jews picked up as hostages by the German Army, and initially held at Hotel Imperial; the same round-up also included Romanian figures who had supported the Allies: Ciurcu, Constantin Antoniade, Alexandrina Cantacuzino, Constantin Cantacuzino-Pașcanu, Nicolae Malaxa, Mina Minovici, and Constantin Rădulescu-Motru. Despite being described as "very ill", he was one of the prisoners dispatched to a facility in Săveni. A polemical memoir of these episodes appeared as Porcii ("The Swine"), and was signed by "Arhibald"—the pen name used by Streitman's fellow exile, Ghiță Rădulescu. In October 1917, Rădulescu and Streitman were picked out for deportation into Bulgaria; they were selected for a comfortable exile in Troyan, where Streitman appeared "in a mountaineer's attire". "Arhibald" claims that Streitman's disease was simulated throughout their Bulgarian exile: "when he forgets that he has to faint, he is as talkative as can be".

Streitman and the Troyan group were released on December 23, 1917, though some accounts suggest that he was also interned for a while at Tismana Monastery. He was active in occupied Bucharest following Romania's armistice (May 1918), an editorial director of Virgil Arion's Renașterea newspaper, which promoted reconciliation with the Germans. According to Alexandru Macedonski of Literatorul (himself a Germanophile), Streitman's arrival at Renașterea was good news, Streitman being "one of the most brilliant Romanian journalists", "a man of great culture and a writer of great talent". The newspaper riled up patriotic sensibilities with pro-German stances, such as when it asked that Romanian civilians who had publicly celebrated German defeats in France be jailed. "Arhibald" suggests that Renașterea was secretly owned by the Germanophile leader, Petre P. Carp, with Jewish publisher Leon Alcaly as his front man. As he notes, Streitman's tenure there pitted him against his own contributions in the earlier stages of war: Streitman now claimed that nobody had ever supported going to war against the Central Powers. The same author includes Streitman and philosopher Iosif Brucăr among a largely Jewish, and more generically foreign, category of intellectuals "passing as Romanians at the German gazettes"; he claims to have found both men's signatures on a memorandum asking the German occupiers to provide them with price-controlled cheese, in return for propaganda services.

After the German capitulation, Streitman returned at the center of Romanian cultural life. He became known as the owner of a library and art salon, Hasefer, which occupied a Venetian-style villa in Bucharest. In January 1919, he was at the forefront of trade unionism in Greater Romania, becoming co-founder of the Union of Professional Journalists (UZP). At age 44, he was the oldest member, unanimously voted in as UZP President following a proposal made by Pamfil Șeicaru. A detailed account by researcher Aurelia Lăpușan notes that Streitman was only elected because the favorite, Nicolae Constantin Batzaria, declined to take office. In tandem, Streitman made sustained efforts to return as a press magnate. In February 1919, he announced that he was going to relaunch Prezentul, alongside a magazine of his own, called Calea ("The Way"). A February 1920 note by fellow Jewish writer I. Peltz informed the general public that Steitman was again preparing his own "entirely original magazine for social and political critique". Streitman also reentered politics, now as a committed anticommunist. As Brătescu writes, he rejected socialism altogether after the October Revolution, and supported the National Liberal Party without joining its ranks. Alongside reporter Adolphe Clarnet and novelist Dinu Nicodin, he joined the entourage of politician Nicolae Săveanu, always appearing in Săveanu's company at Casa Capșa restaurant.

Before the electoral year 1920, Streitman joined the politically diverse People's Party (PP), where he worked alongside the Romanian nationalist poet, Octavian Goga. The Jewish journalist sent articles to the PP's own press organ, Îndreptarea. He was an enthusiastic follower of the party leader, General Alexandru Averescu. In retrospect, he spoke of Averescu as an "imperturbable and incorruptible" figures, chosen by providence to enact a program of "prosperity and order". Streitman was nominated for an eligible seat in a Jewish circumscription, in the newly attached region of Transylvania. Goga campaigned in his favor, telling Jewish voters that "a Jewish intellectual of the Old Kingdom" would be best positioned to advance their demands; Streitman failed at convincing them, probably because Transylvanian Jews wished to be considered separate from the Old-Kingdom Jews. More recognition of his public role in Jewish and Romanian life came in early 1921, when the PP government assigned him to welcome back in Romania Moses Gaster, the expelled Jewish community leader and scholar. Streitman met Gaster at Curtici, and led him to Arad, inspiring his subsequent address to the city's Jewish community.

=== 1920s controversy ===
Following the 1920 setback, Streitman focused his political ambitions on another one of Greater Romania's newer regions, campaigning for the Jewish vote in Bukovina during the race of 1922. As a PP candidate, he was involved in the provincial conflict opposing two advocates of Jewish rights: Mayer Ebner, of the People's Council Party, and Benno Straucher, of the Jewish National People's Party. While Straucher became a National Liberal ally, Streitman and Karl Klüger where signed by Ebner onto a People's Council Party list for the Senate: Streitman for Storojineț, Klüger for Cernăuți. Streitman worked as a councilor for the Ministry of Foreign Affairs, which probably interrupted his senatorial mandate. Records of the time describe him as "formerly a senator". At that stage, Streitman was being courted by the radical modernists and the avant-garde. Resuming his contacts with the socialists, he was taken up by Facla—reportedly, this was his last-ever steady employment by a publication of any kind. In his articles there, Streitman used the pen name Omul de pe stradă ("Man on the street"). According to literary critic Geo Șerban, the choice of name still echoed Streitman's commitment to "social emancipation". As noted by a younger Facla journalist, Nicolae Carandino, he was "convinced that the democratic pseudonym increased [the articles'] circulation."

Streitman's essays were also featured in Contimporanul, a political and art magazine put out by Cocea's pupil, Ion Vinea: his name appears Contimporanul pages from the very first issue, on June 3, 1922. He thus joined the original Contimporanul crew, which mainly comprised left-wing or politically independent social critics, generally adverse to the National Liberal Party. These included, among others, Eugen Filotti, Benjamin Fondane, Nicolae L. Lupu, Camil Petrescu, and Dem. Theodorescu. Streitman was also one of the guest writers for the special issue honoring Tudor Arghezi's contribution to literary life. As "V. Dănoiu", Fondane celebrated in Streitman a contributor to both Romanian journalism and Romanian literature:

[In Streitman,] the Jews have given us a journalist who could become illustrious in any foreign literature, considering his gracious style, his subtlety and delicious irony.

In April 1922, Streitman appeared as a witness in the Dealul Spirii Trial, which saw militants of the newly formed Romanian Communist Party indicted for sedition. He defended some members of the group (specifically Gheorghe Cristescu, Alexandru Dobrogeanu-Gherea, and David Fabian), arguing that there was no evidence for their labeling as traitors and terrorists. In June, as a political chronicler for Contimporanul, he criticized the communist movement as a whole: "Forever meddling and creating havoc, [extremists] 'exaggerate' the teachings, aspirations and goals of the new movements and parties. Worse still: they spoil the leaders' plans". In July 1923, he represented the Jewish Romanians at a congress of ethnic minority journalists, hosted by Árpád Paál in Arad. Also that year, he collected a volume of his Revizuiri ("Revisions"), republishing his 1894 translation from Nordau in 1924; his wife Rachel remained focused on Darwinist literature, and, before the echoes of the Scopes Trial were first felt in Romania, had translated a Darwinian popularization booklet by Émile Ferrière. Going over Revizuiri, Streitman's old friend Ibrăileanu found them to be unusually misanthropic and intellectualist, suggesting that their critique of social life in the 1920s was perhaps exaggerated. Overall, according to his colleague Fondane, Streitman remained an "isolated" journalist, shunned by his press colleagues, "many of whom are Jews". Eventually, two Jewish avant-garde magazines took up his work: Puntea de Fildeș and Isac Ludo's Adam. The former also published his portrait, done by M. H. Maxy.

In August 1925, Facla published a piece by Streitman which asked Romanians to create an openly antisemitic political party. His text was seen as provocative and tasteless by the National Liberal newspaper, Mișcarea. Both Streitman and Klüger were reelected to Senate on the Averescu–Ebner platform during the race of May–June 1926, which returned the PP to government. He took 270 votes, whereas the second-placed Stinodela Scala, a National Liberal, only took 9. The PP's selection was hotly contested in Romania's radical-right circles. Universul newspaper ran a press campaign claiming to expose Goga as a hypocrite or an opportunist: Goga's "national fanaticism", Universul claimed, had been proven as a hoax by his political association with the "erstwhile Jewish" Streitman and the Hungarian Béla Barabás. As a newspaper of the opposition Peasants' Party, Dreptatea similarly noted that PP candidate Ioan Lupaș was assuring his constituents that Averescu had "kept no company with the Hungarians, nor with the Jews", conveniently "forget[ting] Mr H. St. Streitman".

Other nationalist venues accused Streitman of harboring anti-Romanian sentiments, and implied that his patron, Goga, was politically incompetent. A rumor circulated that, at the height of the preceding world war, Streitman had called the Romanians "a gang of thieves, consumed with alcoholism and syphilis". The antisemitic attack on Streitman was taken up in Parliament by the opposition National-Christian Defense League (or LANC), through the voice of Transylvanian Valeriu Pop. Pop, who noted that the supposed quote could be traced back to Die Weltkampf paper (of the Militant League for German Culture), accused the PP of having betrayed the cause of "nationalist activity". Streitman himself denied having made any such statements, and suggested that they were fabricated by "a former German policeman." He was publicly defended by another parliamentarian, Mișu Papp-Craiova, who called himself a man of "antisemitic principles". Papp-Craiova argued:

Streitman was the only Jew to have exhibited a dignified attitude during the war. [...] this particular Jew has never described himself as a Jew, but has always said he was a Romanian.

=== With Titulescu ===
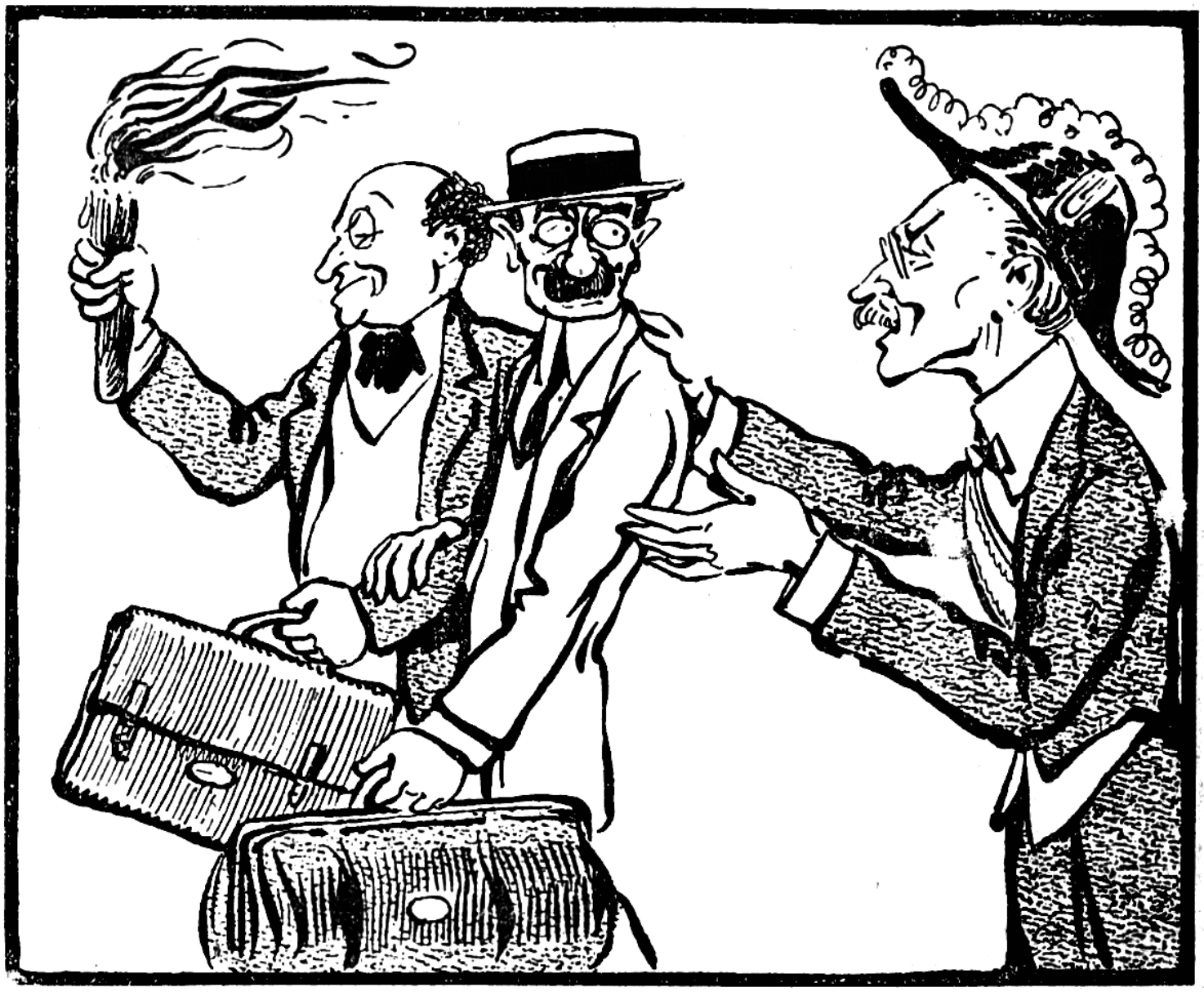
Universul cartoon of May 1925: Ion G. Duca, then serving as Foreign Minister, sending out Streitman (center) and Adolphe Clarnet on diplomatic missions to Slavic Europe

In August 1924, Streitman became an Officer of the Star of Romania. By 1927, he had been made a Commander in the Order of St. Sava and a Knight of Polonia Restituta. Streitman was among the diplomats who worked at tightening Romania's links with the Polish Republic, in the context of the Polish–Romanian alliance. He was an official rapporteur at the Polish–Romanian Conference, held at Galați, and contributed an essay on the history behind that cooperation. It was taken up by Societatea de Mâine magazine, with an editorial note announcing that Streitman was working on three "literary volumes": Între da și nu ("Between Yes and No"), Ziua e scurtă ("The Day Is Short"), Elogiul ipocriziei ("In Praise of Hypocrisy"). Of his planned volumes, only Între da și nu came out, in late 1928, at Editura Cultura Națională, earning attention as a "paradoxical and savory" work. Streitman announced at the time that he was writing a "major book" of Biblical criticism, which focused on Paul the Apostle and Jewish Christianity.

Averescu's premiership ended abruptly in June 1927. Streitman still served in the Foreign Ministry after the National Liberals carried the day, and, during the mandate of Nicolae Titulescu, traveled extensively in Europe. Nevertheless, he maintained a correspondence on the subject with Averescu, informing him about things he had "seen, heard, and thought about" during his trips. One anecdote suggests that Streitman unwittingly uncovered Titulescu's superficiality while traveling with him through the Kingdom of Italy. The Romanian diplomat asked Streitman to explain Italian fascism, and was informed about its precursor, Georges Sorel; Titulescu "went deep into his thoughts for a moment", persuaded that he had once met Sorel. It consequently emerged that he was thinking of historian Albert Sorel, whose classes Titulescu had once attended.

By 1928, Streitman had returned to his career in the national press, managing the newspapers Dimineața and Adevărul. This period coincided with the rise of a National Peasants' Party, which threatened with revolution. Its messages, including alarmist announcements by Ionel Țăranu, were given exposure by Streitman; during October, Streitman was called in to testify at Țăranu's trial, which lasted into 1929. Meanwhile, the People's Party made Streitman its Lower Chamber candidate in the December election, moving him from Storojineț to Cernăuți.

Although no longer holding a seat in Parliament, Streitman was one of Romania's delegates to the 25th Inter-Parliamentary Union Conference, while also representing Romania within a journalists' version of the Little Entente, alongside Filotti and Emil Fagure. He also remained active as an adviser of the Romanian far-right. In his own pamphlet, Mustul care fierbe ("The Frothing Must"), Octavian Goga paid homage to Streitman as the "fine analyst". Goga cited his admiration for Streitman against those who reproached him his antisemitism: "I have never professed that stupid kind of intolerance." At the time, Streitman also advised and financed his friend Șeicaru to set up the nationalist daily, Curentul. In its original edition, this political tribune employed other Jewish men of letters, among them F. Brunea-Fox and Moses Rosen.

In 1929, Streitman launched a new magazine of his own, the short-lived Observatorul Politic și Social ("Political and Social Observer"), with contributions from Mihail Manoilescu. The periodical is noted by historian Simion Costea for its advocacy of a Federal Europe and its popularization of Richard von Coudenhove-Kalergi's ideas on the subject—including Kalergi's belief that "modern Judaism" was a natural ally in constructing the European ethos. In August 1929, Streitman led a Romanian journalists' delegation to Poland, also speaking in front of the Polish Commission in the Free City of Danzig. He signed up for the 1931 electoral campaign as a PP candidate, again in Bukovina. During the interval, he continued to support Titulescu, who was representing Romania at the League of Nations, against those who wanted him sacked. In a 1931 piece, the artist and commentator Ion Sava suggested that Streitman had become too wordy in defending Titulescu, and was failing to draw the general public toward his cause.

=== Between Facla and the far-right ===
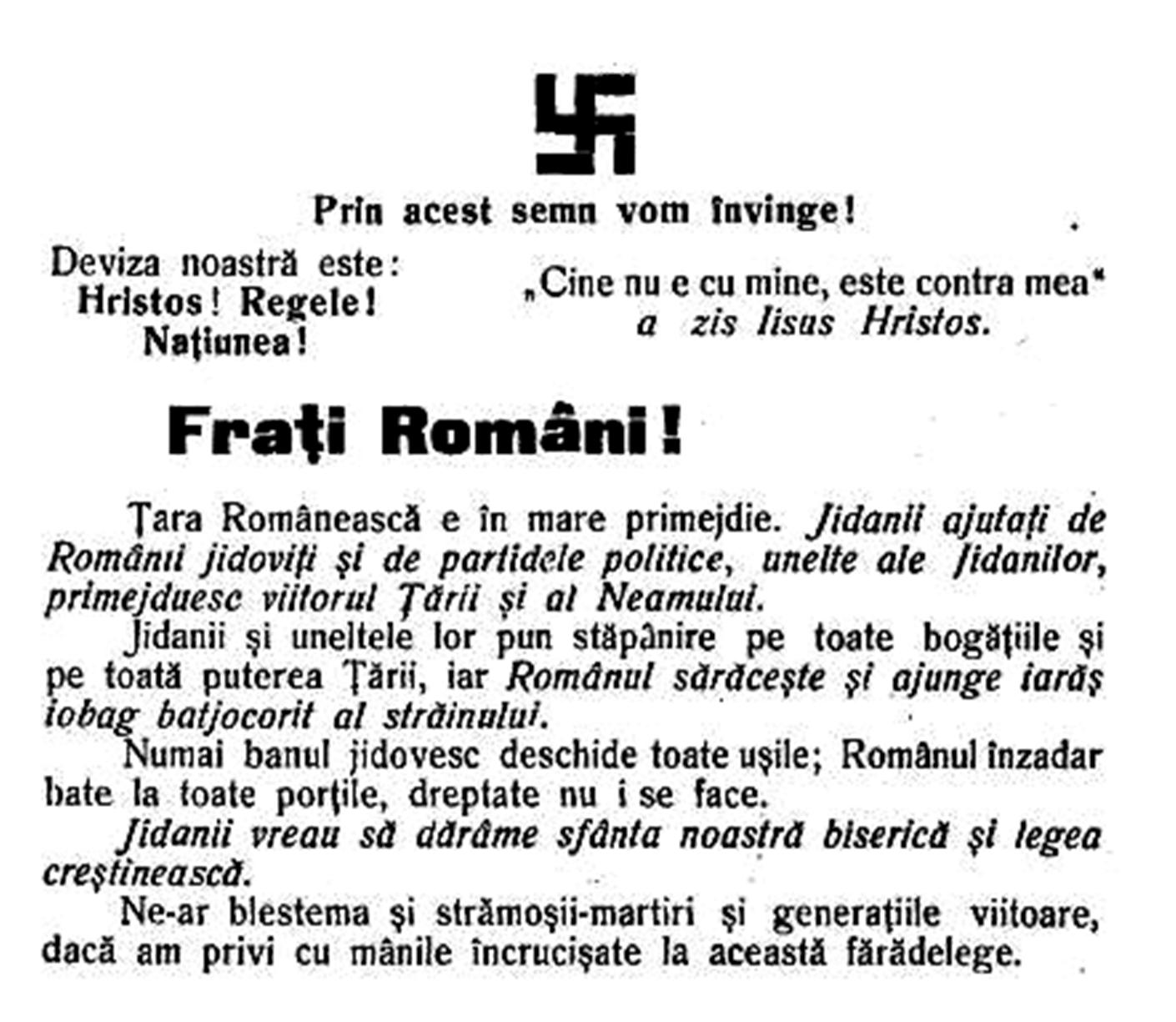
1928 manifesto of the National-Christian Defense League, published under the swastika logo, describing its hostility toward "the kikes" and "the Judaized Romanians"

When, in 1932, Goga left the PP to found his own National Agrarian Party (PNA), Streitman followed suit, thereafter serving on that group's executive committee and writing for Goga's Țara Noastră. Fellow writer Alexandru Robot notes that Streitman had remained in part an investigative journalist, since he still "squeezed himself though the keyholes of various ministries". He also endured as a confidant of Duca, who had since become chairman of the National Liberal Party. Their closeness perplexed Arghezi, who viewed Duca as a dishonorable figure, writing in July 1930: "Two opinions on who Mr I. G. Duca are now circulating around Bucharest. One is that of all people who got to know him, and the other one is only held by Mr H. St. Streitmann". When Duca ultimately became prime minister in late 1933, Streitman recorded his friend's premonition that he would end up being assassinated by the Iron Guard: "Now begins the I. G. Duca tragedy..."

In September 1932, a nationalist doctrinaire, Nichifor Crainic, spoke of Streitman as both a "distinguished intellectual" and an "Ahasuerus" unable to find his place in society, noting that had "switched quite a few religions without settling for any single one". As noted in 1934 by Argetoianu, Streitman was again a politically confused person, since he wrote for "all sorts of publications"—driven mainly by material needs, he was "always meaningful" and "intelligent", a "superior Semite". Argetoianu's notebook records a joke about "Streitman's salute", which was neither the fascist salute nor the communist raised fist, but "arm extended, palm turned up, to pick up something or other". He also recorded how Streitman and Clarnet colluded to obtain larger gifts from their political patron Titulescu. Streitman's own wealth, consisting of "an oak desk and other unspecified items", was confiscated by another court order from his home on Calea Plevnei 72. It was auctioned off in April 1932, this time to repay sums borrowed from Banca Centrală a Țării Românești.

Following up on Între da și nu, Streitman returned in late 1933 with the volume Mi se pare că... ("Signs Point to..."), at Alcaly Publishers. A praise of agnosticism and relativism, it appeared on Pompiliu Păltânea's list of notable prose works for 1934. According to Păltânea: "Mr. Henri Streitman reveals his very own manner [...] of searching for the truth through the most distant detours, those that run into surprises and open up grand perspectives." Robot was critical of Streitman's relativistic approach, describing him as a "puppy [...] urinating on some tree." Doctor Ygrec, the reviewer at Adevărul, found the book amusing overall, but objected to its "commonplace" jokes about God as an anthropomorphic deity. Underneath this covering, "it would seem to me that Mr. Streitman is a religious man".

On June 5, 1935, Streitman was present at Filantropia Hospital for the funeral wake of Octavian's brother, Eugen Goga. Weeks later, the PNA merged with Streitman's old adversaries, the LANC. As noted by Brătescu, the Jewish Streitman became an election agent for the resulting National Christian Party (PNC), a notoriously antisemitic force; Dreptatea, by then a National Peasantist paper, likewise reported that Streitman and Tudor Vianu, both of them Jews, had remained active within a "nationalist, and furthermore antisemitic, movement". Új Kelet contrarily claimed that Streitman had "cut off all contact" with Goga following the unification. Streitman's enjoyment of relativism and networking between rival groups once pushed him to deliberately introduce the far-right philosopher Nae Ionescu to his left-wing critic, Carandino. He explained that: "In life, one must learn to abstract the opinions in one's writings".

Although befriending the fascists, Streitman still assisted with leftist causes. Also in 1932, he joined the staff of Facla, where he was colleagues with several leftist and rightist political commentators: Carandino, Sergiu Dan, Ion Călugăru, N. Davidescu, Sandu Eliad. By August 1933, Max-Radu, a practicing attorney, was handling legal defense for participants in the Grivița strike of February. A while after the Duca assassination, Streitman Sr was a correspondent for N. D. Cocea's extreme-left magazine, Reporter, which published his essays (signed Quidam and Alcest); but also worked with the right-wing Ion Gigurtu at Libertatea. In January 1933, Libertatea's debate club also included Streitman as a guest speaker, introducing a lecture by Argetoianu. In a 1934 review, the young writer Geo Bogza referred to Streitman as one of Romania's five model-journalists, and the prime analyst of his day; the list also included Arghezi, Brunea-Fox, Vinea, and Tudor Teodorescu-Braniște. At the time, Streitman was completing an edition of works by Ion Heliade Rădulescu, which was to feature his comparative essay on the links between Rădulescu's poetry and the Bible. On May 21, 1937, he was one of several journalists awarded Czechoslovakia's Order of the White Lion—other recipients for that day include Brănișteanu, Fagure, Demostene Botez, Ion Clopoțel, Romulus Dianu, and Constantin Gongopol.

An occasional contributor to the Zionist review Renașterea Noastră, Streitman was still personally involved in debates about the "Jewish Question" in Romania. In late 1929, Streitman, Galaction, Felix Aderca and Wilhelm Filderman contributed to Iancu Klein's volume, Combaterea antisemitismului ("Defeating Antisemitism")—which also included pieces by several Romanian politicians—Mihai Antonescu, Paul Negulescu, Constantin Rădulescu-Motru, Alexandru Vaida-Voevod—, Jewish banker Aristide Blank, socialist Leon Ghelerter, and Zionist A. L. Zissu. During February 1934, he was a guest lecturer at a conference on this topic, organized Hasmonaea club and Rădulescu-Motru; he debated the religious aspect, while Mihai Ralea spoke on sociological issues, and Sami Singer discussed Zionism.

=== Nazi collaboration ===
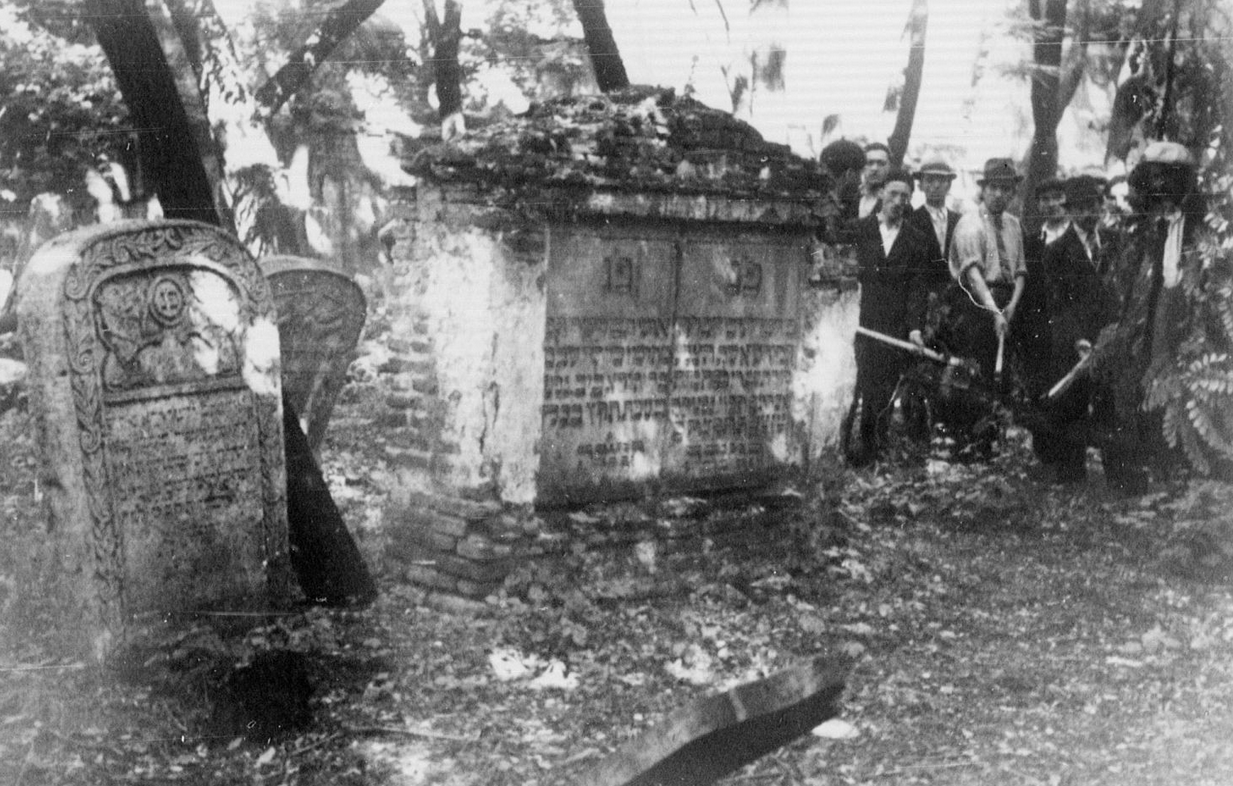
Jewish labor conscripts decommissioning the Sevastopol Street Cemetery, May 1942

In the years leading up to World War II, Romania made antisemitism an official policy. Goga took over as prime minister and, on the first day of 1938, withdrew the free travel permits on Romania's railway network for all Jewish journalists, specifically including Streitman. Max-Radu was arrested the following month, being tried as an alleged confidence man. Under successive fascist regimes, Romania sealed its alliance with Nazi Germany and the Axis powers, and returned with more policies of that nature. On July 13, 1940, Streitman found himself included on lists of "Judaic writers" or "Hebrew thistles", who had "nothing in common with the spiritual structure of the Romanian peasant". Two days later, the ban on his entire work was made official. On August 16, Șeicaru briefly mentioned Streitman in Curentul as "one of the very characteristic personalities of a political world which today's events are irrevocably liquidating".

When the Iron Guard imposed its National Legionary State, Streitman was among the Jews expelled from the Bucharest Journalists' Syndicate (September 23, 1940), though its leaders made sure that he would preserve his pension rights. The Guardists were eventually thrown out by Conducător Ion Antonescu during the clashes of January 1941. In March, I. P. Prundeni wrote in the official newspaper, Porunca Vremii, that there could be no return to the democratic regime as embodied by Titulescu and his followers. Prundeni referred to Streitman as one of Titulescu's Jewish backers, and claimed that he had once served time in prison. Radu Lecca, appointed as Jewish Affairs Commissioner, initially considered relaxing some of the antisemitic decrees, and consulted Zissu on the issue. As recalled by Zissu, they also discussed Streitman:

I drew up a little portrait of him, depicting him as a first-rate newspaperman, willing to do just about anything for cash, as one who was never active in Jewish political life, and as a liar.

Antonescu's takeover generally increased pressures on the Jewish community. As reported by diarist Emil Dorian, in December 1941 Streitman was one of the pro-government Jews who took over as leaders of the revamped Jewish Community:

The Jews are amazed, almost horrified. [...] they are confused by the role of Streitman, and they don't know the government official policies and the reasons for this situation, for which one cannot find enough people.

Lecca soon began organizing a system of coercion, which was to be supervised in his name by the so-called Central Jewish Office (CE). It was seen by the German envoys as the Romanian answer to a Judenrat, capable of assisting in the enforcement of the "Final Solution". Streitman was selected by Lecca to preside over this body, taking over as such on February 7, 1942. He probably owed his appointment to his good rapport with all sides of the political spectrum, and especially to his friendship with Antonescu's friend, Veturia Goga. According to University of Haifa scholar Béla Vágó, he may also have been favored by a special German envoy, Gustav Richter, who also approved of Lazar Halberthal (Streitman's proposal for the Bucharest Jewish Community Presidency, and formerly a Macabi București sportsman).

The CE was also afforded some recognition by the underground Union of Romanian Jews (UER), whose leader, Filderman, allowed colleague David "Dadu" Rosenkranz to head the CE's Section of Professional Reeducation. Scholar Carol Iancu views Streitman, as well as others in the CE, as "traitors and collaborators"—by contrast with the informal Jewish leaders, who stood in opposition to Antonescu. The former journalist remained a figurehead, publishing appeals to calm and obedience, and leaving most administrative work to his second-in-command, Nandor Gingold, M. D. Ethnically Jewish, but a lapsed Catholic by religion, Gingold justified his own compliance by noting that obvious resistance to Nazi demands would bring immediate destruction upon the Romanian Jews. Similarly, in the Jewish weekly Gazeta Evreiască, Streitman informed his fellow Jews that the moment required a special kind of reasoning: "with our heads, and not with our nerves, and not with our backbone." Although conflicted due to the religious prohibitions, the CE had to comply with an official order to relocate the Jewish cemetery on Sevastopol Street. Its eviction in May 1942 was overseen by Streitman, Gingold, Halberthal, and a Sephardi delegate, Marco Prezente.

This attitude made Streitman an adversary of the dissident Jews, who still refused to take Lecca's orders. A memoir by the then-Chief Rabbi, Alexandru Șafran, defines him as "a well-liked journalist, but a perfidious character"; while Gingold "never lost an opportunity to show his contempt", Streitman attended synagogue services regularly, and (though still depicted as a convert to Christianity) burst into tears upon hearing one of Șafran's sermons. The cleric also notes that he attended CE meetings chaired by Streitman, who used his speaking time to insult Zissu. Dorian, who spoke with him in July 1942, reports being stunned by his apparent indifference to news about the Holocaust in surrounding countries: a "salon moralist", he was recommending that "the Jewish people change its outlook on death". Streitman "cannot find justification for the Jewish people's immense zest for life, for living in any conditions and at whatever price." In early August, Streitman found himself opposed by Zissu, who called him a traitor and a renegade. According to historian Hildrun Glass, Zissu was making himself known as the "intransigent" community leader, and, as result of his conflict with Streitman, was interned at the Târgu Jiu camp for political prisoners. Zissu himself explained that the internment came as a result of a provocation, after being told that Jews would be forced to contribute 4 billion lei in "special taxes". He recalls having insulted not just Streitman, but also Rabbi Șafran; he was only arrested because a Romanian inspector general, present at that meeting, deduced that he had also insulted Antonescu.

=== Sacking, postwar obscurity, and death ===
According to a 1945 editorial by Arghezi, Streitman was a "more nominal than real" head of the CE, using his influence generally for the good (such as when, on Arghezi's own request, he protected "a young architect" by having him employed as a CE cadre). Although they countersigned Lecca's extortion measures, no CE official was ever directly involved in the main criminal actions against the Jews, including the deportations to Transnistria. While providing Jewish labor for Antonescu's regime, Rosenkranz also directed relief efforts for survivors of the Iași pogrom and Vapniarka. Iosif Brucăr was asked by Streitman to lead the CE's Education Department, but refused all collaboration. Designated by the Zionist Executive to that same position, Theodor Loewenstein-Lavi used it as a platform for Jewish nationalism. This again infuriated Zissu, who argued that the Executive was acting immorally. In September 1942, Lavi's appointment was also reviewed by Richter, who was enraged by Lavi's history as an anti-Nazi; he was dismissed, and the Zionist Executive was outlawed.

In the aftermath of the incident, Zionist leader Mișu Benvenisti was advised by Streitman to embark for British Palestine, and thus save himself from Richter's vengeance. Streitman himself only served in the CE between February and December 30, 1942, being succeeded by Gingold. Arghezi recounts that the CE's new leadership body was entirely Nazified; he claims that Gingold was Richter's brother-in-law, a proven spy, and, additionally, the leader over a "heap of Jews" who actively undermined their own community. Scholar Yehuda Bauer notes that Streitman had ultimately resigned after witnessing Gingold's attempts to "abolish the autonomy of the communities", an additional sign that Gingold's policies were habitually "disobeyed and undercut."

The new CE executive subsequently put Streitman and Brucăr, alongside banker Aristide Blank, on a list of Jewish hostages; according to Brucăr, this list showed Gingold's priorities: "he was not there to protect the Jews, but to persecute and remove them". Streitman's supervision was assigned to the 31st Police Precinct, which still recorded his address as Calea Plevnei 72. Porunca Vremii revisited his case in an August 1943 piece. It described him as a "tiny old man [of] silent and smiling melancholy", admirably poor, and overall still undecided between "Jewry's moral ghetto" and "our world". The article congratulated him for his peacefulness, which clashed with the rhetorical violence of other Jewish journalist; it also argued that his decency was the reason behind his replacement with "a certain Gingold." However, Porunca Vremii also chided him for his reported attempts to pass himself off as a Romanian, arguing that he was more likable as "a Jew who's not like all the others."

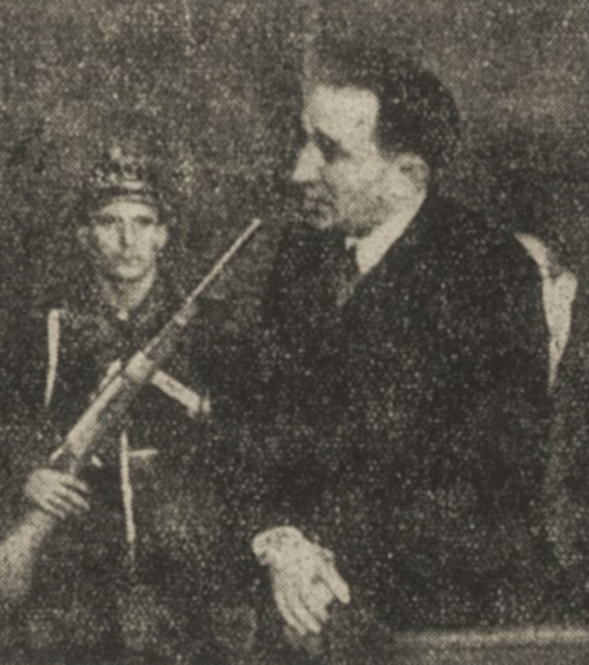
Nandor Gingold receiving his sentence from the Romanian People's Tribunal in February 1946

Streitman's last years brought his return to activism, this time as a Revisionist Zionist, working for a massive Jewish resettlement in Palestine. The anti-Nazi coup of August 1944 toppled Antonescu and brought Romania into the Allied Camp. In February 1945, Arghezi and his magazine Bilete de Papagal openly celebrated Streitman's 75th birthday, making note of his book collection having been restored, and praising his "exemplary marriage, that of a husband, father, and grandfather." Shortly after, Streitman's sister, Ida Schapira, was strangled by a burglar in her home on Filaret Street, Bucharest. Rosenkranz, though still criticized by his peers for his past as a "slave-driver", returned to politics around the same time, when he became general secretary of the legalized UER. He later moved to the left, joining the Jewish Democratic Committee, which also accepted Loewenstein-Lavi. In March 1945, public prosecutor Mihail de Mayo interrogated Șafran and Streitman regarding their history with the CE. Streitman was also placed under investigation by a "purification committee" assigned to the Federation of the Jewish Communities in Romania (FCER). A year later, his colleagues at the CE leadership were brought in front of the Romanian People's Tribunals, whereupon Gingold and Vasile Isăceanu were given life sentences.

Streitman and all other former CE leaders were stripped of their voting rights, by government order, in July 1946—ahead of the November election. Streitman survived the 1947 establishment of a communist regime, which, although anti-Zionist, preferred to ignore him and his political stances. Communist censorship intervened retroactively against Mi se pare că.., copies of which were placed under restricted use. Max-Radu was allowed to perform as a pianist, and, by mid-1947, was managing a "Tudor Vladimirescu people's atheneum" in Bucharest. In May 1948, he was giving concerts at another such institution, named after communist leader Gheorghe Gheorghiu-Dej. Writer Enric Furtună noted in 1951 that he knew "nothing about Henric, not even if he's still alive", and asked if he may have made his way to Israel. While some files kept by the FCER report that Streitman died in Israel in 1949, Rachel and Max-Radu published a notice of Henric's death in Adevărul on March 31, 1950, which was a day after his burial at the Jewish Cemetery on Giurgiului Highway, Bucharest. They asked the public not to follow up with sympathy visits.

== Legacy ==
Shortly before Streitman's death, the regime had clamped down on Zionist activity. It imprisoned Loewenstein-Lavi, who emigrated to Israel in 1957; after acting as a public defender of the Zionists, Rosenkranz also left the country in 1961. Streitman appears as a background character in Alexandru Voitin's historical play Adio, majestate!, fragments of which were first published in December 1967. In the 1972 stage production, he was played by Gheorghe Lazarovici. Carandino's moral and intellectual portrait of his deceased colleague, published as part of his 1979 book De la o zi la alta, calls Streitman "not a reactionary, but a conservative [who] preferred the peacefulness of bourgeois life over any revolution, as long as the revolution was not [just] spiritual." He rates Streitman as one of the "sharpest journalists of that era". Also in 1979, another journalist-turned-memoirist, A. P. Samson, briefly covered Streitman's transition from socialist to "far-right Jew", noting that he was "never one to display a firmness of conviction". Samson believed that Streitman was also a "remarkable writer", whose style evoked François Rabelais.

Streitman's literary contribution remained largely ignored, including after the Romanian Revolution of 1989. Writing in 2015, Șerban noted:

An absurd silence covers [Streitman's] journalistic activity, which is undeniably valuable. Somebody ought to take the initiative of bringing him back into contemporary life, at the very least with a basic selection from the hundreds of texts he left us in those newspapers he wrote for over several decades.

A modern UZP appeared in 1990, and claimed legal succession from the interwar equivalent, with Streitman as is founding president. This narrative was disputed in 2016 by Marian Petcu, who traces its lineage only to a syndicate established in 1955 for the communist press; in discussing the issue, Petcu notes that the earliest UZP was itself generally unprofessional, describing Streitman as:

in turn a socialist, a liberal, a (nationalist) populist and a fascist, who traversed two religions and many an ideology, four sciences, five universities, [...] but who, in 1919, was invested with the attributes of maximal professionalism in homegrown journalism.
