= Constantin Banu =

Romanian writer, journalist and politician (1873 - 1940)

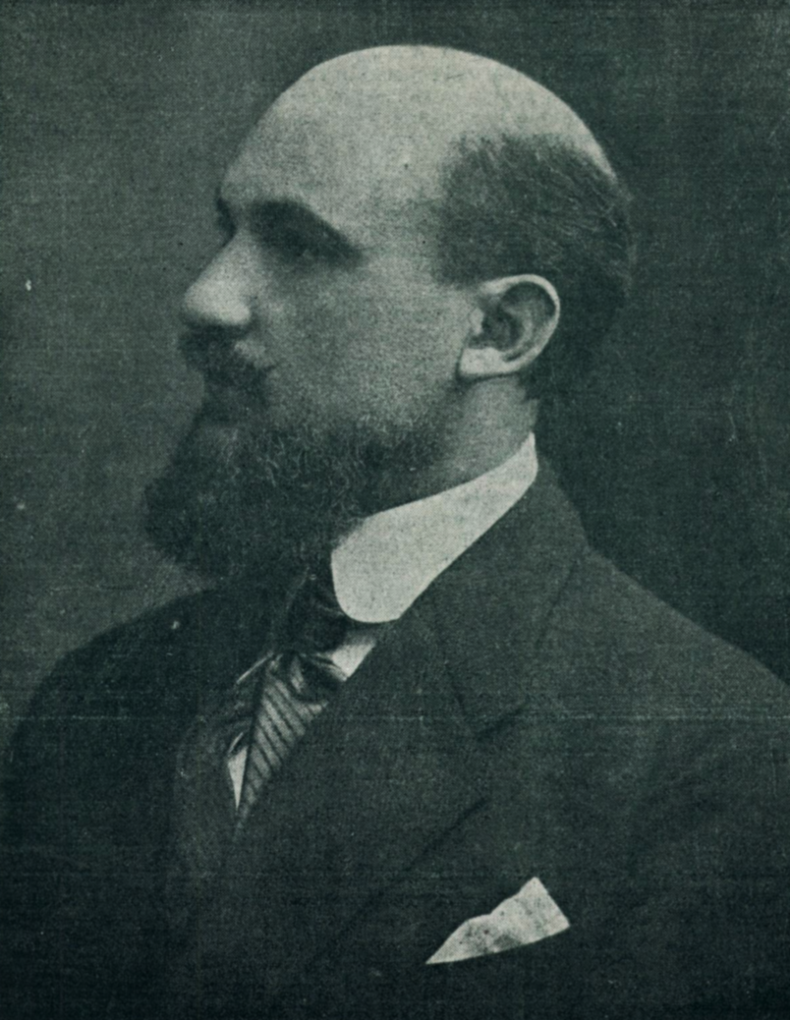
Banu c. 1920

Constantin Gheorghe Banu (March 20, 1873 – September 8, 1940) was a Romanian writer, journalist and politician, who served as Arts and Religious Affairs Minister in 1922–1923. He is remembered in literary history as the founder of Flacăra review, which he published in two editions, alongside Petre Locusteanu, Ion Pillat, Adrian Maniu, and, later, Vintilă Russu-Șirianu. A best-selling magazine for its time, it functioned as a launching pad for several writers of the Romanian Symbolist movement.

Banu was an affiliate and orator of the National Liberal Party, which he served continuously for 30 years, as a political journalist, public polemicist, and member of Parliament. His contribution as an essayist, lampoonist, and aphorist reflected his progressive approach to labor and productive life, his critique of conservatism, as well as his concept of civilized political mores.

Banu's career in politics reached the international level during World War I, when he took refuge from German-occupied Romania to campaign for the Romanian cause in Paris. Subsequently, during his term as minister, he focused on negotiating a Romanian Concordat and normalizing relations with the Catholic Church. In his final years in politics, he was an affiliate of the National Liberal Party-Brătianu. These activities, like much of his vast (but fragmentary) work in print, or his speeches, endured as the focus of political controversy.

== Biography ==
=== Early years and political debut ===
Born in Bucharest, his father was a Gheorghe N. Banu, and his mother a Smaranda (or Coralia) Banu. He was French on his mother's side, but his exact lineage is unclear. According to Banu himself, his French grandmother led a mysterious life in Bucharest and died at Așezămintele Brâncovenești Hospital in September 1848. Her husband was a Greek-Romanian known as Koronidy, who may have been a shipbuilder or a schoolteacher from a shipbuilding family. On his father's side, Banu was probably descending from a clan of Romanian shepherds. His grandfather or great-grandfather was reportedly a Staroste of the furriers' guild in Galați.

Baptized Romanian Orthodox, Banu completed secondary education at Saint Sava National College, a classmate of writer Ioan A. Bassarabescu, actor Ion Livescu, and lawyer-politician Scarlat Orăscu. Influenced by their teacher, classical scholar Anghel Demetriescu, they formed their own literary club, which held its meetings in the Saint Sava basement, putting out the polygraphed magazine Armonia, then the bi-monthly Studentul Român. Banu was also in a mathematics class taught by Ștefan Popescu. By his own recollection, he was a struggling student, and had much trouble learning trigonometry from the textbook of Spiru Haret—his future political mentor and employer.

Banu graduated from the literature and philosophy faculty of the University of Bucharest in 1895, and from the law faculty in 1900. As he himself noted in 1936: "Although not a literary professional, I always had a soft spot for literature." He also had an enduring passion for history, as noted by his professor Nicolae Iorga, who recommended him for a teacher's chair. During a stint as a novice teacher in Brăila, he had his "second encounter" with Haret, who, as Education Minister, was personally inspecting the local schools. He equated listening to Haret's speech as a personal revelation about the sheer force of one's creative energies.

Returning to Bucharest, Banu began working as a history professor at Matei Basarab High School in 1898, part of a teaching staff which came to include Dimitrie D. Pătrășcanu, Emanoil Grigorovitza, Theodor Speranția, Alexandru Toma, and Eugen Lovinescu. One of his students was the poet George Topîrceanu. Banu later transferred to the Nifon Mitropolitul Seminary. In this environment, he founded a literary-and-theatrical society, with contributions from pupil Petre Locusteanu, who later became his friend and close associate. His debut in letters came in 1900, with a brochure criticizing the textbook author Serafim Ionescu and the teaching of Romanian history. At the time, Banu also took up work as a promoter of public literacy, joining Ioan Kalinderu and Barbu Știrbey's Steaua Association, which had as its object "the strengthening of education among regular folk through moral, patriotic and useful publications".

In 1900, Banu's former professor, folklorist G. Dem. Teodorescu, died. Attending his funeral, Banu gave a rousing speech exhorting the values of work ethic. His political articles that appeared in Secolul XX starting in 1899, as well as his oratorical talent, drew the attention of Haret's own National Liberal Party (PNL). Around 1903, he was a functionary in the upper echelons of Education Ministry, Chief Inspector of the Private Schools under Minister Haret, in which capacity he first met and encouraged the novelist (and aspiring politician) Mihail Sadoveanu. Upon moving to Bucharest, he took over a villa on Parfumului Street, where he lived with his wife Aneta (or Ioana). She came from a boyar family of Western Moldavia, and owned an estate at Hălăucești. Their two sons, Nicolae and Ioan, were respectively born in 1907 and 1908.

As noted by memoirist Constantin Kirițescu, Banu quit the education system when his job became "a nuisance, a hindrance to his rise." Working for the liberal press, he was editor-in-chief of Voința Națională from 1903 and director of Viitorul from 1907, part of a team that also comprised future PNL leader Ion G. Duca and scholar Henric Streitman. At Voința Națională, Banu inaugurated a literary supplement, which put out feuilletons by Sadoveanu, Ioan Alexandru Brătescu-Voinești, Ilarie Chendi, Nicolae Gane, and Ion Bentoiu. Under his auspices, Voința Națională also featured commentary on literature, theater and painting. Under the pen name Teofil, he wrote the column Una-alta ("This and That") in a literary style, focusing on politics, but also outlining his belief in the didactic value of art. It was also at this paper that he resumed his close collaboration with Locusteanu.

=== Flacăra creation ===
Meanwhile, Banu's radical politics collided with the agenda of the Conservative Party and its Prime Minister, Gheorghe Grigore Cantacuzino. During the peasants' revolt of early 1907, Iorga and Banu's Bucharest homes were searched by police, who confiscated "a great number of letters and important papers." The riots were repressed with much violence; in the aftermath, Banu asked his students at Nifon Mitropolitul to submit anonymous essays on the "peasant question and the recently quelled peasant uprising." This investigation showed that these rural students generally detested the upper class of "boyars" for their "enormous wealth", which they saw as exploiting the sharecropper's toil.

In his late years, Banu still recalled the impression left on him by the revolt, "this free-riding daughter of Nature": "I have seen pillars of fire roaming the villages, setting train stations alight, and crackling among the ruins." In the election of May, running on PNL lists in Ialomița County, Banu took a seat in the Assembly of Deputies. He was its Secretary from 1907 to 1911. Banu impressed his audience, including the Conservative adversary Alexandru Marghiloman, with his oratorical skill. In 1910, he was among the jurors who condemned to prison Gheorghe Stoenescu-Jelea, the would-be assassin of Prime Minister Ion I. C. Brătianu. Upon the Conservatives' return to power, he failed to win a seat in the 2nd College Ilfov County in the February 1911 election, running on a coalition anti-Conservative list headed by Nicolae Fleva.

On October 22, 1911, Banu and Locusteanu printed the first issue of Flacăra, a weekly literature and current events magazine. When asked what motivated him to launch his own magazine, Banu referred to his literary passion, and also noted that the magazine (or "literary newspaper") was "of some use to my [liberal] party"—"Duca understood this from the very start, and so he was happy to inaugurate the magazine with an article of his own". The name, literally "Flame", was chosen in oblique reference to the "pillars of fire" of 1907. These, Banu argued, could be turned into constructive fires of "purification".

With its "people's agenda", Flacăra had a regular circulation of 15,000, peaking at 30,000, which was unusually high for the demographic and literacy standards of the Kingdom of Romania. This was largely because of Locusteanu's contribution in publicity, but also, according to Banu, to the talents featured in its pages. Also according to Banu, the magazine owed its survival to Locusteanu and, secondly, to Spiru Hasnaș. It had unparalleled success among the urban middle classes, particularly with its exposure of literary scandals. One such series described in detail the suicide attempt, agony, and death of a poet, Dimitrie Anghel. Anghel's estranged wife, Natalia Negru, was enraged by the coverage, and speculated that Anghel had been left to die in order to benefit Banu's circulation. She also contended that Banu and Duca together ran a "liberal mafia".

Flacăra was also disliked by professional critics. Reviled for its alleged eclecticism and lack of aesthetic discernment, the magazine became involved in polemics, mainly written by Banu, who also personally interviewed his featured writers. The magazine set out as a mainstream review, hosting established talents such as Ion Luca Caragiale and Barbu Ștefănescu Delavrancea; its most nonconformist contributors were "moderate" Romanian Symbolists: Ion Minulescu, Caton Theodorian, and Victor Eftimiu, later joined by Barbu Nemțeanu, and sometimes by Nicolae Budurescu, Alexandru Dominic, and Eugen Titeanu. Most of Banu's own writings appeared in Flacăra; these included poems, aphorisms and literary, cultural and political articles. He also signed his work as Glaucon and Mefisto, and sometimes used Al. Șerban, Const. Paul and Cronicarul Dâmboviței, pen names he shared with Locusteanu. His journalistic work, also carried in George Diamandy's Revista Democrației Române, sought to express political objectivity and sincerity. Some of his socially themed texts, conceived as sketches or little scenes, denounced parasitism, lack of patriotism, arrogance and aggressive stupidity; his ideology veered toward producerism. According to literary historian George Călinescu, such works are without stylistic value: "C. Banu shows up in his aphorisms as a grieving but trite Guicciardini, of no humanistic worth".

At the time of their publishing, Banu's texts were derided by a rival modernist, Tudor Arghezi, who, by one estimate, wrote half of his lampoons entirely against Banu or Flacăra. In Arghezi's magazine Facla, Banu and Locusteanu were viewed as "triumphant mediocrities" and "street organs", on the same artistic level as Radu D. Rosetti and Maica Smara. Nevertheless, with Ion Pillat and Adrian Maniu as caretakers of the literary pages, Flacăra also turned to more radical forms of modernism. Pillat, Maniu, and Horia Furtună also "conspired" to relaunch here the disgraced Symbolist mentor, Alexandru Macedonski, serializing his novel Thalassa; and helped launch the career of George Bacovia, publishing his plaquette Plumb. Symbolist N. Davidescu took over as the literary reviewer, pushing an aesthetic ideal that was inspired by readings from Remy de Gourmont; the other staff reviewer was Hasnaș who, Călinescu notes, merely wrote "earnestly". The magazine also published illustration by, among others, the debuting avant-garde draftsman, Marcel Janco.

=== World War I ===
In the years before World War I, returned to the Assembly, Banu debated major national issues with the Conservative Party doctrinaires. Responding to Constantin C. Arion's call for national unity after the Balkan Wars, he argued that such internal peace could never be achieved with "an aggrieved peasantry as the basis of our State". A land reform, he contended, could even make Romania into a great regional power. Nevertheless, Banu was also critical of the populist currents undermining the PNL, and thus picked sides against Iorga and his Democratic Nationalists. His Flacăra articles, Iorga noted at the time, supported anti-nationalist causes such as Jewish emancipation, while his parliamentary speeches expressed worries against the rise of Romania's insurrectionist "Boulangisme". Banu hoped to appease Conservatives who viewed land reform as proof of socialism, contending that "increasing property" was the best method to curb left-wing agitation and promote "social conservation". He also campaigned for election reform, insisting that it could solve the "periodic convulsions" in Romanian society, and criticizing the Conservatives' electoral ideal as a Potemkin village.

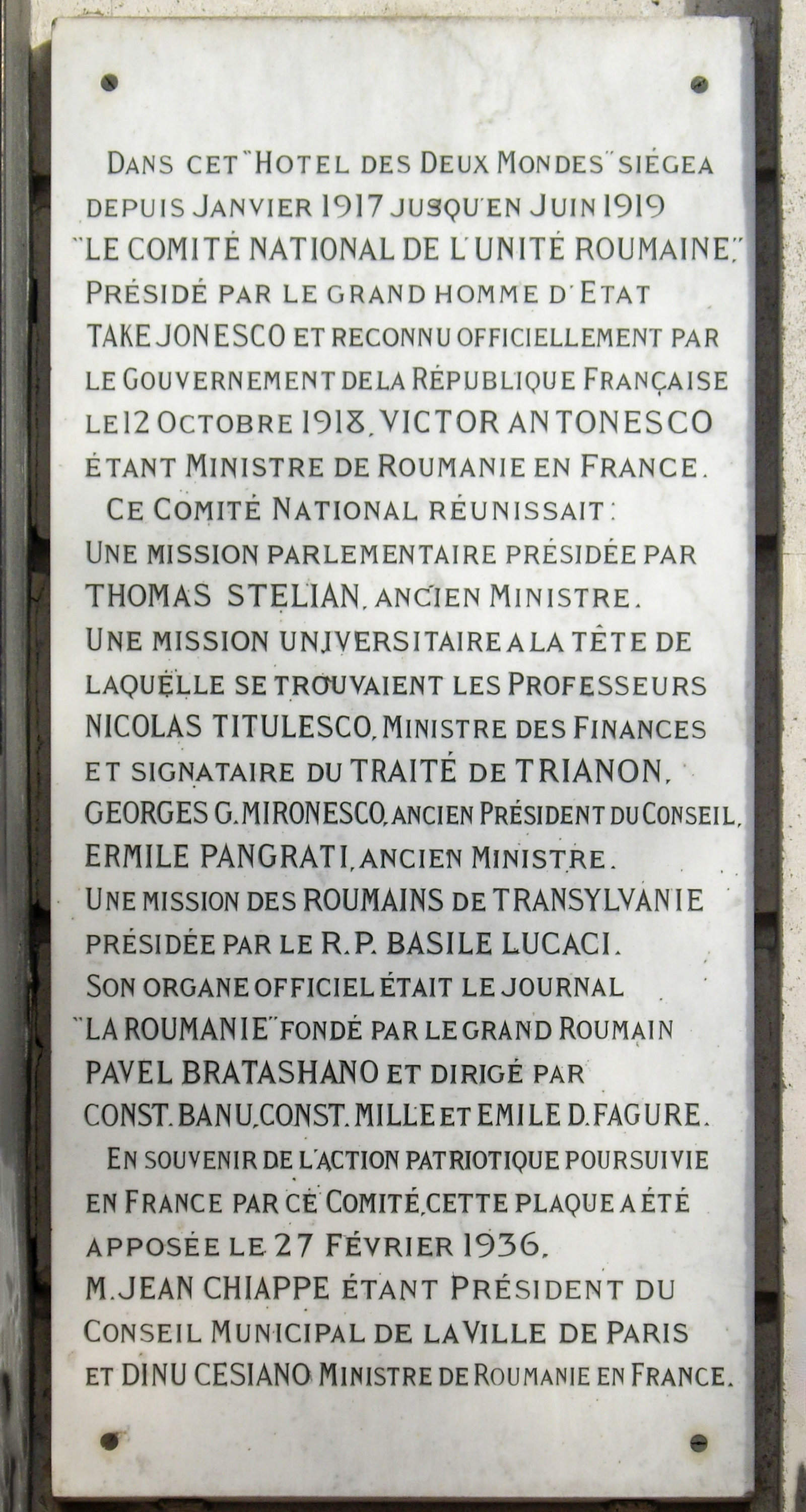
Plaque honoring the 1917–1918 National Committee for Romanian Unity, at the former Hôtel des deux mondes, Avenue de l'Opéra, Paris. Banu credited as one of three La Roumanie editors

By 1914, Banu was also writing for the Flacăra satellite Semnalul, for the PNL paper Democrația, and for the literary bimonthly Văpaia. In July, days after the Sarajevo assassination, Banu was selected on a panel of deputies, headed by Mihail G. Orleanu, which proposed democratic reforms to the 1866 constitution. Other members included Iorga, Constantin Stere, Nicolae Romanescu, and Vintilă Brătianu. Romania kept neutral during the first two years of war, but an intellectual battle divided Romanian society, between "Francophiles", who supported the Entente, and "Germanophiles", who looked to the Central Powers. Banu and the National Liberals leaned toward the Entente Francophiles. In October 1914, he directed a rally of university students who vandalized the offices of Ziua, a Germanophile daily put out by Ioan Slavici, and chanted threats against Grigore Gheorghe Cantacuzino, owner of the Germanophile Seara.

Although, as historian Lucian Boia writes, it remained "without jarring partisanship", Flacăra's Ententist-and-populist tinges were ridiculed and parodied in Chemarea, the radical-left Symbolist review put out by Ion Vinea. Banu's 1916 book Sub mască ("Under the Mask"), signed Mefisto, included poems initially published in Flacăra's Gazeta rimată column. Their subjects received varying treatment, with tones that ranged from humor and pamphleteering jokes to invective; Banu himself acknowledged that such pieces were "sometimes mean and often unfair". As critics note, his critical virulence and moralizing intent were balanced by a certain literary talent, itself subsumed by the categorical nature of polemic. Also published that year, the brochure Trăiască viața!… ("Long Live Life!…") is a collection of articles, some of them distinctly autobiographical.

Honoring its secret commitment to the Entente, Romania entered the war in August 1916. Flacăra closed down with a final issue on November 13 of that year, as Bucharest prepared for the German siege. Banu later escaped to Paris, where, from January 1918, he joined the directorial staff of La Roumanie journal (with Emil Fagure and Constantin Mille), campaigning in French for the cause of Greater Romania. He intervened directly to obtain statements of solidarity with beleaguered Romania from Ernest Lavisse, Lucien Poincaré, and other French academics, while trying in vain to prevent the Romanian government from negotiating a separate peace with the Central Powers.

With the turn of tides, Banu formed part of the Romanian delegation to the Paris Peace Conference in 1919, attending as co-director of La Roumanie. He was reelected to the Assembly in November 1919, ensuring his political survival into the era of universal suffrage: although imposed on the Ialomița voters by the PNL leadership, he overcame both stiff opposition by the Peasants' Party and factional disputes inside his own caucus. From his position as deputy, he made overtures toward Iorga and the Democratic Nationalists in power, moderating his party's attacks against them. In March 1920, when the anti-PNL coalition was toppled by King Ferdinand I, Iorga proposed that Banu and Matei B. Cantacuzino form a technocratic government of national reconciliation; the monarch preferred a cabinet headed by Alexandru Averescu. Banu found himself toppled by his Ialomița constituents during the election of May 1920.

Banu put out two more editions of Flacăra between December 10, 1921, and June 1923, with Vintilă Russu-Șirianu as his second, contributions from old regulars such as Minulescu and Macedonski, and food chronicles by Păstorel Teodoreanu. Banu who wrote regularly for Cuget Românesc monthly during that interval, had no say in Flacăra's management, which went to Pillat, Furtună, and then Minulescu. Despite their "great efforts", he noted, the magazine failed commercially—"such were the times."

=== Ministerial office and later life ===
Still in the Assembly following the 1922 election, Banu served as Arts and Religious Affairs Minister under Prime Minister Brătianu, from January 19, 1922, to October 30, 1923; he was also ad interim Minister of Public Works on January 19–22, 1922. During that time, he involved himself in negotiating a Concordat, in the hope of normalizing relations with the Holy See. The 1923 constitution gave special recognition to the Orthodox and Greek Catholic Church, but Banu satisfied the former when he stripped state representatives of their right to elect bishops. According to memoirist and PNL man Ion Rusu Abrudeanu, he erred in keeping by his side the Greek Catholic functionary Zenovie Pâclișanu, who stood accused of undermining the PNL and of leaking the Concordat draft to the Catholic press in Transylvania. Reportedly, Pâclișanu also sabotaged Banu's investigation into allegations of church art smuggling by Catholic clergymen who migrated to Hungary.

Banu's accomplishments as minister include his successful promotion of Romania's first copyright law, on January 15, 1923. He also founded an Inspectorate of Romanian Museums, under Alexandru Tzigara-Samurcaș, but withheld its financing later on. The two politicians negotiated for a reciprocal exchange of coveted cultural goods between, on one hand, Romania and, on the other, Weimar Germany and the Austrian Republic. They only managed to obtain the Cucuteni Treasure from Berlin.

By late 1923, Banu was noted for his opposition to the new PNL establishment, whose most prominent figure was Vintilă Brătianu; unlike his colleagues, he did not believe in the goal of "crushing" the opposition, at the time led by the Peasants' Party. Resigning from the Ministry in November, to be replaced by Alexandru Lapedatu, Banu still served in the Senate, but largely withdrew from public life. His articles and musings were being still published in Adevărul, Convorbiri Literare, and Cele Trei Crișuri. In 1927, celebrating the golden jubilee of Romanian Independence with conferences at the Bucharest Atheneum, Banu outlined his liberal critique of the conservative ethos, turning against "reactionary" cultural figures such as Caragiale, Mihail Eminescu, and the Junimea circle. Such themes were also explored in his lectures, recorded by Radio Romania in 1929 and 1933. As Caragiale scholar Șerban Cioculescu noted at the time, Banu's "effete phraseology" and "cliche vocabulary" encased his resentments against conservative intellectuals, who had exposed and satirized the "characteristics of practical liberalism".

Between 1927 and 1930, the PNL polarized into competing factions: one led by Vintilă Brătianu and the other, the "Georgists", by Gheorghe Brătianu. Banu was on the side of the former, and also expressed his faction's sympathy for King Carol II, who had returned from exile to reclaim his throne. By December 1933, with Vintilă dead and Duca, his one-time colleague at Viitorul, in charge of the party, Banu had embraced Georgism and defected to the PNL's seceded wing, the "National Liberal Party-Brătianu". He and Artur Văitoianu were the most notorious PNL assets to follow Gheorghe Brătianu on this venture. This move was also a sign of Banu's opposition to the politically ambitious Carol II: Banu, Brătianu, and Constantin C. Giurescu were working on a proclamation against Carol, his camarilla, and Duca, the acting PNL Prime Minister. A year later, after Duca's unexpected assassination by the Iron Guard, a National Peasants' Party administration intervened to stop Banu, Brătianu, P. P. Negulescu and others from coordinating massive opposition rallies. The Iron Guard also took notice, and Banu's name appeared on an enemies' list, alongside those of Aristide Blank, Alexandru C. Constantinescu, Wilhelm Filderman, and Gheorghe Gh. Mârzescu.

According to Kirițescu, Banu reached the "forefront of politics", but failed to preserve his position—overall, he lacked "the faculty which allows one to wiggle through, to engage in transactions". Banu's final book appeared in 1937 as Grădina lui Glaucon sau Manualul bunului politician ("Glaucon's Garden or A Textbook for Good Politicians"). Here, he uses his political and artistic experience to analyze his peers in 757 sections (aphorisms, words of advice and morality sketches). Through these, he shows his ethical leanings, irony, and skepticism, formulating concise general judgments.

Banu spent his final years away from the capital, at his wife's home in Hălăucești. He died in 1940 at a hospital in Roman, and was buried in Plot 21 of Bellu Cemetery, Bucharest. His former mentor and adversary Iorga paid homage to him with an obituary in Neamul Românesc, emphasizing that Banu, the "unusual figure" among his peers, belonged to an older era of "dignity and decency, when people were held up by talent and merit". Banu's oratory was of "great formal restraint, unjarring."

Aneta Guțulescu-Banu survived her husband for decades, dying in 1970. Their first-born Nicolae "Bob", who lived to 1985, was married to the actress Lucia, a member of the Rosetti family and niece of the composer George Enescu. Ioan, his brother, died in 2001. Constantin and Aneta's other child was a daughter, Ana-Irina "Nazica", who married the engineer Nicolae Cristofor. The villa built by the Banus' on Parfumului Street was nationalized by the communist regime, and assigned to an army institution. In 1987, at the height of the Ceaușima campaign, it was demolished.
