= Vintilă =

Vintilă is both a masculine Romanian given name and a surname. Notable people with the name include:

== Surname ==
- Octavian Vintilă (born 1938), Romanian fencer
- Simona Vintilă (born 1980), Romanian footballer

== Given name ==
- Vintilă of Wallachia, ruler of Wallachia in May 1574
- Vintilă Brătianu (1867–1930), Romanian politician and Prime Minister of Romania
- Vintilă Ciocâlteu (1890–1947), Romanian physician and academic
- Vintilă Cossini (1913–2000), Romanian footballer
- Vintilă Horia (1915–1992), Romanian writer
- Vintilă Mihăilescu (1951–2020), Romanian anthropologist
- Vintilă Russu-Șirianu (1897–1973), Romanian journalist, memoirist, and translator
- Vintilă Weiss (c. 1920–1974), Romanian Securitate official and whistleblower

== See also ==
- Vintilă Vodă, commune in Buzău County, Romania
