= Platonești =

- Commune
- Location in Ialomița County

- Location in Romania
- Coordinates: 44°36′N 27°42′E
- Country: Romania
- County: Ialomița

Government
  - Mayor (2024–2028): Florinel Negraru (PSD)
- Area: 37.2 km^{2} (14.4 sq mi)
- Elevation: 18 m (59 ft)
- Population (2021-12-01): 1,582
  - Density: 42.5/km^{2} (110/sq mi)
- Time zone: UTC+02:00 (EET)
  - Summer (DST): UTC+03:00 (EEST)
- Postal code: 927208
- Area code: +(40) 243
- Vehicle reg.: IL
- Website: www.platonesti.ro

Platonești is a commune located in Ialomița County, Muntenia, Romania. It is composed of two villages, Lăcusteni and Platonești. These were part of Săveni Commune until 2005, when they were split off.

Historical population
Year	Pop.	±%
2002	2,023	—
2011	1,798	−11.1%
2021	1,582	−12.0%
Source: Census data
