= George Arion =

Romanian crime writer

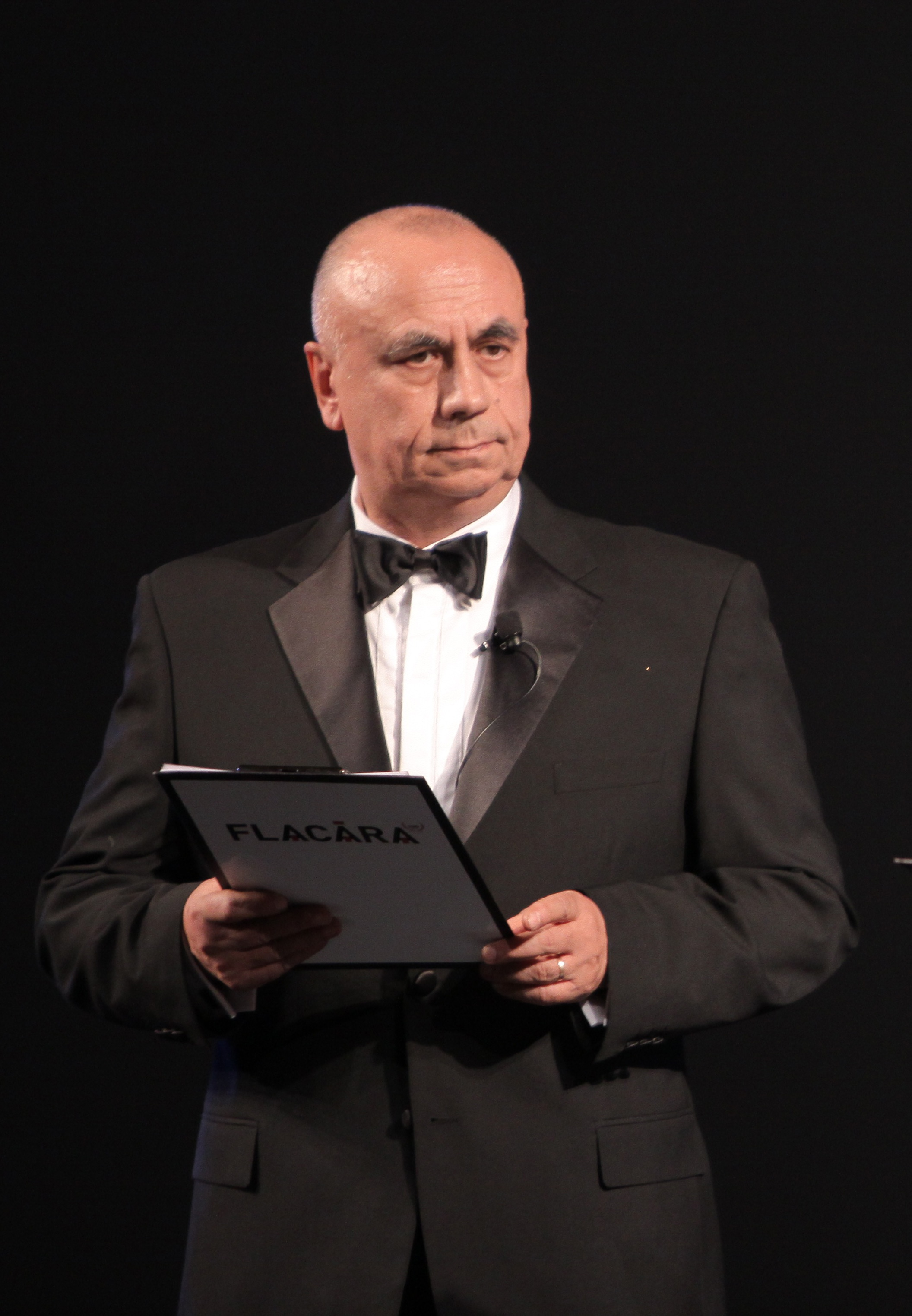

George Arion (born April 5, 1946 in Tecuci) is a Romanian crime writer. He is also a poet, essayist, librettist and journalist. He is the Chairman of the Flacăra Publications, Chairman of the "Flacăra Prizes" foundation and Chairman of the Romanian Crime Writers’ Club.

His literary debut came in 1966 with the publishing of a collection of poems. But it is in 1983 that his novel-writing carrier really starts, with the publishing of Attack in the Library. Thanks to his first novel, George Arion quickly became known as the initiator of a renewal of the Romanian crime novel. He effectively gave a new impulse to the genre by having a refreshing foundation. He raised the literary standards and moved them away from their mostly propagandist use at the time.

George Arion stands out through an alert rhythm, short phrases, the use of colored language by his characters, and an extraordinary irony. He is influenced by Raymond Chandler, Boileau-Narcejac, San Antonio.

== Critical response ==
- "Thanks to George Arion we finally have a true and native crime novel." - Ov. S. Crohmălniceanu, Literary Romania (România Literară), 1984.
- "I don’t think there is another character in our contemporary literature capable of competing with Andrei Mladin in popularity. Built seemingly just for fun, this tall and suave man has succeeded… in conquering the hearts of the most varied groups of readers (and, especially, female readers), amounting to actual fights between children and parents, brother and sister, husband and wife, lover and sweetheart on the subject of who has the right to read the book first." Tudorel Urian, Student Life (Viața Studențească), 28 January 1987.
- "Arion’s crime novels stand out through an alert style, through humour and through the picturesque language of his characters." Mircea Zagi, Marian Papahagi, Aurel Sasu, The Dictionary of Romanian Writers (Dicționarul Scriitorilor Români), 1995.
- "George Arion is a virtuoso of crime writing." Dumitru Micu, The History of Romanian Literature from Folklore to Post-Modernism (Istoria literaturii române de la creația populară la post-modernism), 2000.

== Mystery and Thriller novels ==
- Atac în bibliotecă (Attack in the Library), 1983.
- Profesionistul. Țintă în mișcare (The Professional. Moving Target), 1985.
- Trucaj (Stunt), 1986.
- Pe ce picior dansați? (Choosing sides), 1990.
- Crimele din Barintown (Barintown Murders ), 1995.
- In 1996, the complete Andrei Mladin collection was published with the title Detectiv fără voie (The Reluctant Detective), reedited in 2008 by Crime Scene Publishing.
- Nesfârșita zi de ieri (Endless Yesterday), reedited as Șah la rege (The King in Check) in 2008
- Cameleonul (novel) (The Chameleon), 2001.
- Anchetele unui detectiv singur (The Investigations of a Lone Detective), 2003.
- Spioni în arșiță (Spies in the Heat), 2003.
- Necuratul din Colga (The Demon of Colga), 2004.
- Crime sofisticate (Sophisticated Murders), 2009.
- Fortăreața nebunilor (The Fortress of the Lunatics), 2011.
- Attack in the Library (English translation of Atac în bibliotecă), 2011, Profusion Crime, London
- Sufocare (Suffocation), 2012.
- Cible royale (French translation of Nesfârșita zi de ieri), 2014, Genèse Edition, Paris-Bruxelles
- Insula cărților (The Island of Books), 2014, Crime Scene Press.
- Qui veut la peau d'Andreï Mladin ? (French translation of Atac în bibliotecă), 2015, Genèse Edition, Paris-Bruxelles
- Însoțitorul lui Iisus (The Companion of Jesus), 2016, Crime Scene Press.
- Maestrul fricii (Master of Fear), 2017, Crime Scene Press.
- La Vodka du Diable (French translation of Profesionistul. Țintă în mișcare), 2017, Genèse Edition, Paris-Bruxelles
- Убиство во библиотеката [Ubistvo vo bibliotekata] (Macedonian translation of Atac în bibliotecă), 2017, Antolog
- Trimisul special (The Special Envoy), 2018, Crime Scene Press.
- Umbrele din Ada Kaleh (Shadows of Ada Kaleh), 2019, Crime Scene Press.
- Mâna care închide ochii (The Hand that Shuts the Eyes), 2020, Crime Scene Press.
- Vizita tinerei doamne (The Visit of the Young Lady), 2024, Crime Scene Press.

== Poetry ==
- Copiii lăsați singuri (The Children Left Alone), 1979.
- Amintiri din cetatea nimănui (Memories from the Abandoned Citadel), 1980.
- Traversarea (The Crossing), 1997.
- Uite cine nu vorbește (Look who isn't talking), poetry for children, 1997.
- Thriller, 2025, Crime Scene Press.

== Literary criticism ==
- Alexandru Philippide sau drama unicității (Alexandru Philippide or the Drama of Uniqueness), 1981.
- Starting from 2006, George Arion is also responsible for a section entirely devoted to crime novels in the Sunday edition of Jurnalul Național.

== Journalistic works ==
- Interviuri (Interviews), 1979.
- Interviuri II (Interviews 2), 1982.
- Dialogul continuă (The Dialogue Goes On), 1988.
- Life Under the President of a Kingdom (Viața sub un președinte de regat), 1997.
- O istorie a societății românești contemporane în interviuri (1975-1999) (A History of the Contemporary Romanian Society in Interviews(1975-1999)), 1999.
- Liniște! Corupții lucrează pentru noi (Silence! The Corrupt are Working for Us), 2003.
- Cele mai frumoase 100 de interviuri (The Most Beautiful 100 Interviews), 2011.

== Scripts ==
- Enigmele se explică în zori (Enigmas are Explained at Dawn), 1989.
- Atac în bibliotecă (Attack in the Library), 1992.
- Detectiv fără voie (The Reluctant Detective), television series, 2001.

== Theatre and Opera ==
- Autograf (Autograph): dramatic monologue, 150 performances at the Bucharest National Theatre.
- Scena crimei (Crime scene): crime tragicomedy, broadcast on a Romanian public radio station (Radio România Actualități) in 2008. On stage premiere at the „Tudor Vianu” theatre in Giurgiu.
- În labirint (In the Labyrinth): opera, writing of the libretto – music by Liana Alexandra. On stage at the Timișoara Opera House in 1987.
- Amintiri din livada cu meri (Memories from the Apple-tree garden) – crime tragicomedy, broadcast on a Romanian public radio station (Radio România Actualități) in 2011.
- Misterul unei nopți cu viscol (The Mystery of a Blizzard Night) – Familia magazine, n° 11–12, 2012.
- Autograf (Autograph; 2022) - 10 plays

== Lyrics ==
George Arion has written the lyrics for Eugen Cristea’s album called Soldat căzut din iubire (The Soldier Fallen for Love) in 2009.

== Prizes ==
The Romanian Writers’ Union prize three times: 1985, 1995, 1999.
