= Petre Locusteanu =

Romanian journalist and humorist (1883–1919)

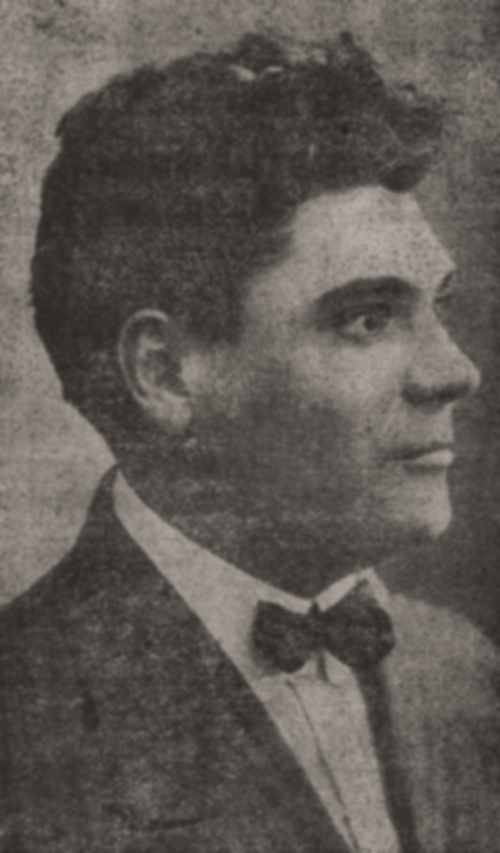
Locusteanu in 1911

Petre Locusteanu (Romanian pronunciation: [ˈpetre lokusˈte̯anu]; 1883 – March 1919) was a Romanian journalist and humorist.

He was born in Bucharest. Locusteanu was hired to work at the National Theater of Craiova, but proved unsuccessful as an actor, which pushed him toward a career as a journalist. At Flacăra, he was editor and drama columnist from 1911 to 1914, assisted by Ion Pillat. In 1916, he edited his own bimonthly magazine, Ziarul meu; from 1917 to 1918, in the temporary World War I national capital of Iași, he administered România newspaper. His first published work was the 1910 farce Nevasta lui Cerceluș. This was followed by brief biographies and humorous sketches, collected as Cincizeci figuri contimporane (1913) and Suntem nebuni (1914). His legacy among prose humorists is modest, faring poorly in comparison with other writers of the prewar period, such as I. A. Bassarabescu, D. D. Pătrășcanu, Alexandru Cazaban and Aurel P. Bănuț. He committed suicide in 1919.
