= Dimitrie D. Pătrășcanu =

Romanian prose writer and dramatist (1872–1937)

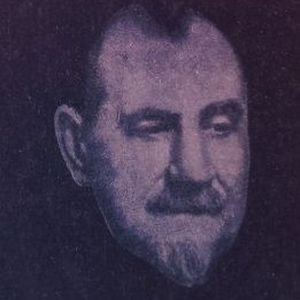
Dimitrie D. Pătrășcanu

Dimitrie D. Pătrășcanu (October 8, 1872 – November 4, 1937) was a Romanian prose writer and dramatist.

== Early life and education ==
Born in Tomești, Iași County, his parents were Dimitrie Pătrășcanu, a farmer, and his wife, Maria (née Vicol). He attended primary school in his native village and in Iași, followed by the National College in the latter city. In 1893, he entered the literature and philosophy faculty of the University of Iași, as well as the higher normal school.

== Career ==
After graduating, Pătrășcanu taught history at Focșani, Bacău, and Bucharest. He wrote numerous textbooks, a pursuit to which he dedicated himself entirely in his last years.

A member of the National Liberal Party, he was elected to the Assembly of Deputies on a number of occasions.

Pătrășcanu made his published debut with an article in the Bacău gazette Crainicul. He formed part of the circle surrounding Viața Românească magazine, to which he began contributing in June 1906, with an article on folk tales. The co-director of Viața Românească's publishing house and bookstore, he played a key role in the magazine's relaunch in 1920, following World War I.

He also wrote for Luceafărul, Flacăra, Lumina and Adevărul literar și artistic.

Pătrășcanu's humorous prose (Schițe și amintiri, 1909; Ce cere publicul de la un deputat și alte schițe, 1912; Timothei mucenicul, 1913; Candidat fără noroc și alte povestiri folositoare, 1916; Înzăpădiți!, 1916; Domnul Nae – Scene din vremea ocupației, 1921; Decorația lui Vartolomei, 1924; Un prânz de gală, 1928) largely revolves around situational comedy, with buffoon-type effects. Timothei mucenicul earned him the Romanian Academy's prize.

== Personal life ==
Pătrășcanu's son was Lucrețiu Pătrășcanu.

=== Death ===
Pătrășcanu died in Bucharest.

== See also ==
- List of playwrights
- List of Romanian writers
