= Vintilă Russu-Șirianu =

Romanian writer (1897–1973)

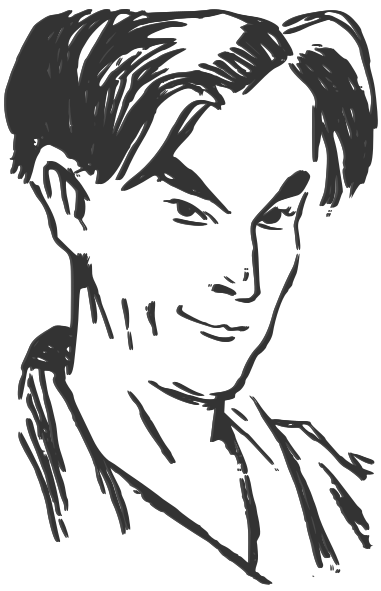
1926 caricature of Russu-Șirianu, by Victor Ion Popa

Vintilă Russu-Șirianu (April 20, 1897 – February 25, 1973) was an Austro-Hungarian-born Romanian journalist, memoirist, and translator.

== Biography ==
Born in Arad, his father was the journalist and activist Ioan Russu-Șirianu, whose uncle was the writer Ioan Slavici. After attending high school in his native city, he left for Bucharest, capital of the Romanian Old Kingdom. He enrolled in the Conservatory and at the University of Bucharest's medical faculty, but completed neither. He took part in World War I as an officer in the Romanian Army; in the temporary capital of Iași, while visiting the homes of Barbu Ștefănescu Delavrancea, Nicolae Iorga, Take Ionescu, and Osvald Teodoreanu, he became acquainted with Robert de Flers, whom he later assisted in Paris. After the end of the war and his native province's union with Romania, he returned to Bucharest, completing the literature and philosophy faculty. He was technical secretary at the League for the Cultural Unity of All Romanians, librarian for the Romanian Academy, editor at Flacăra, secretary to Octavian Goga, and an opinion journalist. From 1923 to 1924, he was secretary of the Romanian Writers' Union, in which capacity he organized a number of tournaments and soirées.

He made his literary debut in 1919, and then sporadically contributed poems and articles to Flacăra, Gândirea, Cugetul românesc, Adevărul literar, Cuvântul liber and Rampa. In 1927, he left for Paris, where he edited the monthly Revue Franco-Roumaine magazine. While there, he became acquainted with nearly the entire French literary establishment and also with local Romanian émigrés (including George Enescu, Constantin Brâncuși, Panait Istrati, Elena Văcărescu, Marthe Bibesco, Ilarie Voronca, Nicolae Titulescu, and Marioara Ventura). His 1969 memoir, Vinurile lor..., features lively, finely drawn recollections of these individuals. With Alexandru Băbeanu, he wrote the play Biruitorul, which was staged at the National Theatre Bucharest in 1924. After the Coup of 1944 against the country's pro-Axis dictator, he and Cezar Petrescu dramatized the latter's novel Ochii strigoiului and wrote Mânzul nebun. In 1947 and under the imminent rise of the communist regime, he penned plays for workers and local cultural stages. These are thoroughly obsolete today, as are his poems, anthologized in 1972 as Îmi amintesc de aceste versuri with the assistance of Mihai Gafița. He translated Honoré de Balzac (Gobseck) and Roger Martin du Gard (The Thibaults). Pen names he used include V. R. Ș., Ion Dacu and D. Dinu.

He died in Bucharest on February 25, 1973; in 2017, his remains and those of his father were reinterred in Șiria.
