= Săveni, Ialomița =

Săveni
- Commune
- Location in Ialomița County

- Location in Romania
- Coordinates: 44°36′N 27°38′E
- Country: Romania
- County: Ialomița

Government
  - Mayor (2024–2028): Daniela Mariana Drăgoi (PSD)
- Area: 93.25 km^{2} (36.00 sq mi)
- Elevation: 22 m (72 ft)
- Population (2021-12-01): 3,042
  - Density: 32.62/km^{2} (84.49/sq mi)
- Time zone: UTC+02:00 (EET)
  - Summer (DST): UTC+03:00 (EEST)
- Postal code: 927205
- Area code: +(40) 243
- Vehicle reg.: IL
- Website: comunasaveni.ro

Săveni is a commune located in Ialomița County, Muntenia, Romania. It is composed of two villages, Frățilești and Săveni. It also included Lăcusteni and Platonești villages until 2005, when they were split off to form Platonești Commune.

Historical population
Year	Pop.	±%
1899	771	—
1925	3,001	+289.2%
2002	3,612	+20.4%
2011	3,276	−9.3%
2021	3,042	−7.1%
Source: Census data
