= Flacăra =

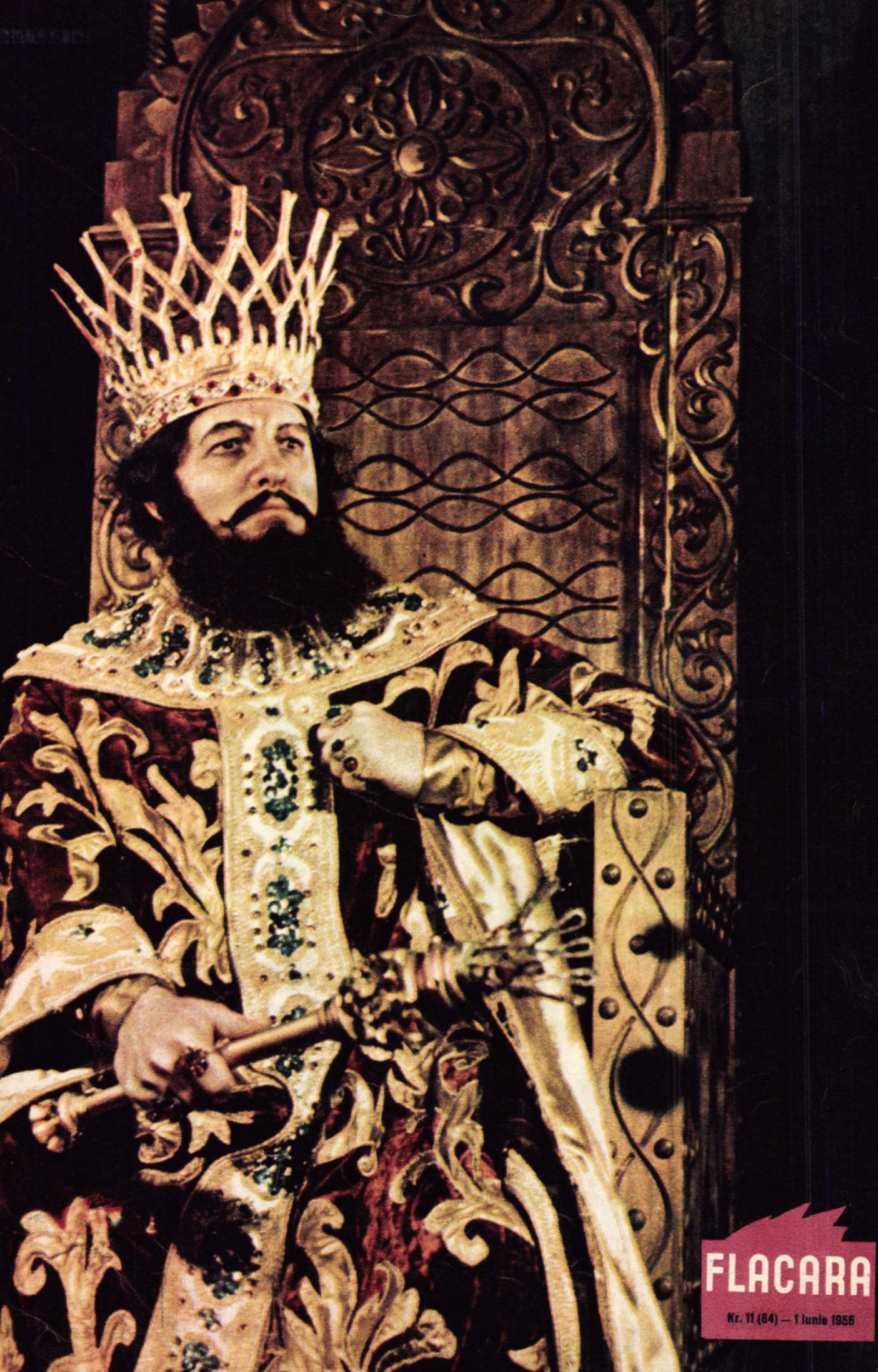
- Cover of June 1956, with baritone Șerban Tassian as John III the Terrible
- Categories: Literary magazine
- Frequency: Weekly
- Founder: Constantin Banu
- First issue: 22 October 1911; 114 years ago
- Country: Romania
- Based in: Bucharest
- Language: Romanian
- Website: Flacăra

Flacăra (Romanian for "The Flame") is a weekly literary magazine published in Bucharest, Romania.

== History and profile ==
Flacăra was started in 1911. The first issue was published on 22 October 1911. The founder was Constantin Banu and the magazine covers the articles on the literary work by Romanian writers. The headquarters is in Bucharest. During the Ceauşescu era it was a communist publication, and supported the isolation of Romania from Europe together with other magazines.

Following the Romanian Revolution of December 1989 George Arion was elected as the editor-in-chief of the magazine.

Flacăra launched its website in 2010.

== See also ==
- List of magazines in Romania
